= 2018 New York Liberty season =

- Head coach: Katie Smith
- Arena: Westchester County Center

Results
- Record: 7–27 (.206)
- Place: 5th (Eastern)
- Playoff finish: Did not qualify

Media
- Television: MSG Network (MSG), MSG Plus (MSG+)

The 2018 New York Liberty season was the 22nd season for the New York Liberty franchise of the WNBA, and their 1st season under head coach, Katie Smith. The season tipped off on Saturday, May 20, 2018, against the Chicago Sky in Chicago. During the off-season the Liberty hired Katie Smith as head coach. Smith replaced Bill Laimbeer, who left to coach the Las Vegas Aces. It was also announced in the offseason that the team would play its home games at the Westchester County Center.

The 2018 season ended up being a difficult one for the Liberty. After having achieved a 22-win season in 2017, the team could only muster 7 wins in 2018. The team started 1–2 in May, but quickly fell behind the playoff pace going 3–9 in June. Things did not improve in July when the team went 3–7. The team finished the season on a thirteen-game losing streak, including an 0–9 August to finish the season 7–27. This was the franchise's worst record in its history. The previous worst was 11–23 in 2013.

== Transactions ==
=== WNBA draft ===
Round	Pick	Player	Nationality	School/Team/Country
1	10	Kia Nurse	Canada	Connecticut
2	22	Mercedes Russell	United States	Tennessee
3	34	Leslie Robinson	United States	Princeton

=== Trades/Roster Changes ===
Date	Details
February 9, 2018	Re-Signed G Bria Hartley
February 9, 2018	Re-Signed C Kia Vaughn
February 9, 2018	Re-Signed F Rebecca Allen
February 9, 2018	Re-Signed G Lindsay Allen
May 1, 2018	Signed G Marissa Coleman

== Roster ==
2018 New York Liberty roster
Players
Coaches

Pos.	No.	Nat.	Name	Height	Weight	DOB	From	Yrs
G/F	9	(Australia)	Allen, Rebecca	6' 2" (1.88m)	162 lb (73kg)	1992-11-06	Australia	3
G	15	(United States)	Boyd, Brittany	5' 9" (1.75m)	156 lb (71kg)	1993-06-11	California	3
F/C	31	(United States)	Charles, Tina	6' 4" (1.93m)	192 lb (87kg)	1988-12-05	Connecticut	8
G/F	0	(United States)	Coleman, Marissa	6' 1" (1.85m)	160 lb (73kg)	1987-01-04	Maryland	9
G	8	(United States)	Hartley, Bria	5' 8" (1.73m)	148 lb (67kg)	1992-09-30	Connecticut	4
G	5	(Canada)	Nurse, Kia	6' 0" (1.83m)		1996-02-22	Connecticut	R
G	10	(Russia)	Prince, Epiphanny	5' 9" (1.75m)	179 lb (81kg)	1988-01-11	Rutgers	8
G	14	(United States)	Rodgers, Sugar	5' 9" (1.75m)	161 lb (73kg)	1989-12-08	Georgetown	5
C	41	(United States)	Stokes, Kiah	6' 3" (1.91m)	191 lb (87kg)	1993-03-30	Connecticut	3
C	7	(United States)	Vaughn, Kia	6' 4" (1.93m)	205 lb (93kg)	1987-01-24	Rutgers	9
C	17	(Sweden)	Zahui B., Amanda	6' 5" (1.96m)	250 lb (113kg)	1993-09-08	Minnesota	3
G	1	(United States)	Zellous, Shavonte	5' 10" (1.78m)	188 lb (85kg)	1986-08-28	Pittsburgh	9

Head coach
(United States) Katie Smith (Ohio State)
Assistant coaches
(United States) Herb Williams (Ohio State)
(United States) Barbara Farris (Tulane)
Athletic trainer
(United States) Chantal Hart

Legend

- (C) Team captain
- (DP) Unsigned draft pick
- (FA) Free agent
- (S) Suspended
- Injured

== Game log ==
=== Pre-season ===
2018 pre-season game log
May: 1–1 (Home: 1–1; Road: 0–0)

Game	Date	Team	Score	High points	High rebounds	High assists	Location Attendance	Record
1	May 7	vs. Dallas	L 69–76	Coleman (14)	Tied (4)	Zellous (4)	Mohegan Sun Arena	0–1
2	May 8	vs. Los Angeles	W 81–75	Nurse (19)	Gray (14)	4 Tied (3)	Mohegan Sun Arena; 1,106	1–1

2018 pre-season schedule

=== Regular season ===
2018 game log
Total: 7–27 (Home: 4–13; Road: 3–14)
May: 1–2 (Home: 1–1; Road: 0–1)

Game	Date	Team	Score	High points	High rebounds	High assists	Location Attendance	Record
1	May 20	@ Chicago	L 76–80	Charles (19)	Zahui B. (7)	Hartley (6)	Wintrust Arena; 7,922	0–1
2	May 25	Minnesota	L 72–78	Charles (18)	Charles (12)	Hartley (3)	Westchester County Center; 2,315	0–2
3	May 29	Dallas	W 94–89	Charles (34)	Charles (10)	Zellous (9)	Westchester County Center; 1,516	1–2

June : 3–9 (Home: 2–5; Road: 1–4)

Game	Date	Team	Score	High points	High rebounds	High assists	Location Attendance	Record
4	June 2	@ Indiana	W 87–81	Nurse (34)	Stokes (12)	Tied (4)	Bankers Life Fieldhouse; 5,575	2–2
5	June 5	Phoenix	L 74–80	Charles (25)	Tied (8)	Hartley (5)	Madison Square Garden; 7,215	2–3
6	June 7	Connecticut	L 86–88	Charles (24)	Charles (9)	Zellous (7)	Westchester County Center; 1,581	2–4
7	June 10	Indiana	W 78–75	Rodgers (16)	Tied (4)	4 Tied (3)	Westchester County Center; 1,537	3–4
8	June 13	Las Vegas	L 63–78	Charles (19)	Coleman (5)	Coleman (5)	Westchester County Center; 1,419	3–5
9	June 16	@ Minnesota	L 71–85	Charles (12)	Tied (4)	Hartley (6)	Target Center; 9,114	3–6
10	June 19	Atlanta	W 79–72	Charles (29)	Vaughn (9)	Boyd (11)	Westchester County Center; 1,627	4–6
11	June 22	@ Las Vegas	L 78–88	Tied (14)	Charles (8)	3 Tied (5)	Mandalay Bay Events Center; 5,478	4–7
12	June 24	@ Los Angeles	54–80	Zahui B (21)	Boyd (6)	Boyd (8)	Staples Center; 9,203	4–8
13	June 26	Phoenix	L 69–83	Charles (12)	Charles (8)	Boyd (7)	Westchester County Center; 1,839	4–9
14	June 28	@ Washington	L 77–80	Prince (21)	Charles (7)	Charles (6)	Capital One Arena; 4,473	4–10
15	June 29	Chicago	L 99–103	Charles (24)	Stokes (5)	Prince (5)	Westchester County Center; 1,837	4–11

July : 3–7 (Home: 1–3; Road: 2–4)

Game	Date	Team	Score	High points	High rebounds	High assists	Location Attendance	Record
16	July 1	@ Chicago	W 97–94 (OT)	Charles (28)	Vaughn (11)	Boyd (5)	Wintrust Arena; 5,382	5–11
17	July 3	Seattle	L 62–77	Hartley (16)	Zellous (7)	3 Tied (4)	Westchester County Center; 1,749	5–12
18	July 5	@ Washington	L 67–86	Charles (26)	Charles (12)	Hartley (7)	Capital One Arena; 4,674	5–13
19	July 8	Dallas	L 87–97	Charles (26)	Charles (9)	Boyd (5)	Westchester County Center; 1,719	5–14
20	July 11	@ Connecticut	W 79–76	Charles (19)	Charles (11)	Boyd (8)	Mohegan Sun Arena; 7,413	6–14
21	July 15	Chicago	W 107–84	Charles (21)	Vaughn (7)	Boyd (10)	Westchester County Center; 2,073	7–14
22	July 17	@ Dallas	L 87–104	Nurse (25)	Charles (6)	Tied (4)	College Park Center; 6,459	7–15
23	July 19	@ Atlanta	L 68–82	Charles (11)	Boyd (7)	Boyd (10)	McCamish Pavilion; 3,074	7–16
24	July 21	Washington	L 78–95	Charles (22)	Charles (5)	Hartley (6)	Westchester County Center; 2,005	7–17
25	July 24	@ Minnesota	L 82–85	Charles (32)	Charles (15)	Boyd (9)	Target Center; 9,830	7–18

August : 0–9 (Home: 0–4; Road: 0–5)

Game	Date	Team	Score	High points	High rebounds	High assists	Location Attendance	Record
26	August 1	@ Connecticut	L 77–92	Rodgers (16)	Vaughn (7)	Boyd (8)	Mohegan Sun Arena; 6,412	7–19
27	August 4	Indiana	L 55–68	Charles (11)	Charles (10)	Charles (4)	Westchester County Center; 2,225	7–20
28	August 6	Seattle	L 80–96	Tied (20)	Zahui B. (11)	Boyd (7)	Madison Square Garden; 12,488	7–21
29	August 8	Los Angeles	L 81–82	Charles (27)	Stokes (11)	Boyd (7)	Westchester County Center; 2,481	7–22
30	August 12	Atlanta	L 77–86	Charles (26)	Stokes (10)	Charles (5)	Westchester County Center; 2,362	7–23
21	August 14	@ Los Angeles	L 66–74	Charles (21)	Vaughn (8)	Tied (4)	Staples Center; 11,067	7–24
32	August 15	@ Las Vegas	L 72–85	Tied (14)	Stokes (11)	Boyd (6)	Mandalay Bay Events Center; 7,159	7–25
33	August 17	@ Seattle	L 77–85	Charles (21)	Stokes (15)	Boyd (5)	KeyArena; 10,873	7–26
34	August 19	@ Phoenix	L 85–96	Nurse (28)	Stokes (9)	Boyd (7)	Talking Stick Resort Arena; 13,106	7–27

2018 season schedule

== Standings ==
#	Eastern Conference	W	L	PCT	GB	Home	Road	Conf.
1	Atlanta Dream (2)	23	11	.676	–	13–4	10–7	12–4
2	Washington Mystics (3)	22	12	.647	1	12–5	10–7	12–4
3	Connecticut Sun (4)	21	13	.618	2	13–4	8–9	9–7
4	e – Chicago Sky	13	21	.382	10	7–10	6–11	6–10
5	e – New York Liberty	7	27	.206	16	4–13	3–14	6–10
6	e – Indiana Fever	6	28	.176	17	2–15	4–13	3–13

== Statistics ==
Legend
GP	Games played	GS	Games started	MPG	Minutes per game	RPG	Rebounds per game
APG	Assists per game	SPG	Steals per game	BPG	Blocks per game	PPG	Points per game
FG%	Field-goal percentage	3P%	3-point field-goal percentage	FT%	Free-throw percentage	TO	Turnovers per game
PF	Fouls per game		Team leader		League leader

=== Regular season ===
Player	GP	GS	MPG	FG%	3P%	FT%	RPG	APG	SPG	BPG	PPG
Tina Charles	33	33	33.0	47.3	32.6	77.0	7.0	2.7	0.7	0.6	19.7
Kia Nurse	34	7	22.8	40.2	29.4	87.0	2.4	1.6	0.7	0.1	9.1
Bria Hartley	34	20	23.7	38.9	30.8	70.8	2.9	3.6	0.9	0.1	8.5
Epiphanny Prince	16	12	19.1	39.3	41.9	87.5	1.6	1.7	0.9	0.0	8.4
Shavonte Zellous	22	22	24.1	42.3	26.7	75.4	3.1	3.0	0.6	0.2	8.2
Amanda Zahui B.	29	0	15.9	50.0	34.4	60.5	3.0	0.7	0.4	0.4	7.7
Brittany Boyd	30	14	19.6	41.4	37.0	77.4	3.9	5.3	1.2	0.1	6.4
Sugar Rodgers	31	13	19.6	36.2	32.3	82.6	3.2	2.0	0.7	0.1	6.3
Kia Vaughn	29	27	18.3	53.3	0.0	64.3	4.0	0.7	0.7	0.2	5.7
Marissa Coleman	21	18	18.3	34.8	27.9	100	2.4	1.0	0.5	0.2	4.7
Rebecca Allen	28	0	10.4	37.6	26.3	84.0	1.7	0.3	0.3	0.4	3.8
Kiah Stokes	30	4	14.2	54.5	0.0	53.3	4.5	0.4	0.4	0.6	3.1

== Awards and honors ==
Recipient	Award	Date awarded	Ref.
Tina Charles	WNBA Eastern Conference Player of the Week	June 4, 2018	
Tina Charles	WNBA All-Star Selection	July 17, 2018	
