= 2018 Phoenix Mercury season =

WNBA season

- Head coach: Sandy Brondello
- Arena: Talking Stick Resort Arena

Results
- Record: 20–14 (.588)
- Place: 2nd (Western)
- Playoff finish: 5th seed; lost in Semifinals to Seattle

Media
- Television: Fox Sports Arizona (FS-A)

The 2018 WNBA season was the 22nd season for the Phoenix Mercury franchise of the WNBA. The season tipped off on May 14.

The Mercury started the season slowly, going 2–3 in May. They won the first two games, but lost the next three. All five games were against eventual playoff teams. However, the Mercury caught fire in June, posting an 11–2 record which included an 8-game winning streak. The June high turned into a July low. The team was 2–7 in July with their only wins coming against Connecticut, and league-worst Indiana. The Mercury managed to turn it around and end the season on a high, going 5–2 in August. Their regular season ended on a three-game winning streak, with all games coming against playoff teams. The Mercury finished the season 20–14, with the 5th seed in the 2018 WNBA Playoffs.

As the fifth seed, the Mercury had to play an opening round game against the Dallas Wings at home. The Mercury won by 18 points, 101–83. This win saw them advance to the second round where they played the fourth seeded Connecticut Sun in Connecticut. Again, the Mercury won, this time by 10 points. With the win, the Mercury advanced to the Semifinals to face the first seeded Seattle Storm. The home team won each game in the five-game series. However, the Mercury did not have home court advantage, due to being the lower seed, and lost the series 2–3 despite nearly completing a dramatic comeback after being down two games to none.

== Transactions ==
=== WNBA draft ===
Round	Pick	Player	Nationality	School/Team/Country
1	12	Marie Gülich	Germany	Oregon State
2	20	Tyler Scaife	United States	Rutgers
2	21	Raisa Musina	Russia	UMMC Ekaterinburg (Russia)
3	26	Imani Wright	United States	Florida State

=== Trades/Roster Changes ===
Date	Details
February 1, 2018	Sign F Sancho Lyttle
February 2, 2018	Acquired 21st pick in the 2018 WNBA draft in exchange for C Cayla George.
February 2, 2018	Acquired 26th pick in the 2018 WNBA Draft and a 3nd round pick in the 2019 WNBA draft in exchange for C Kelsey Bone.
February 2, 2018	Re-signed G Yvonne Turner and G Emma Cannon
February 5, 2018	Re-signed F Camille Little
February 13, 2018	Re-signed G/F DeWanna Bonner
March 6, 2018	Acquired G Briann January in exchange for the 8th pick in the 2018 WNBA Draft.
March 6, 2018	Acquired the 12th pick in the 2018 WNBA draft in exchange for G Danielle Robinson and a second round pick in the 2019 WNBA Draft.

== Roster ==
2018 Phoenix Mercury roster
Players
Coaches

Pos.	No.	Nat.	Name	Height	Weight	DOB	From	Yrs
F	24	(United States)	Bonner, DeWanna	6' 4" (1.93m)	143 lb (65kg)	1987-08-21	Auburn	8
C	42	(United States)	Griner, Brittney	6' 9" (2.06m)	205 lb (93kg)	1990-10-18	Baylor	5
C	21	(Germany)	Gülich, Marie	6' 5" (1.96m)	199 lb (90kg)	1994-05-28	Oregon State	R
G	12	(United States)	January, Briann	5' 8" (1.73m)	144 lb (65kg)	1987-01-11	Arizona State	9
F	20	(United States)	Little, Camille	6' 2" (1.88m)	180 lb (82kg)	1985-01-18	North Carolina	11
F	31	(Spain)	Lyttle, Sancho (injured)	6' 5" (1.96m)	175 lb (79kg)	1983-09-20	Houston	13
G	5	(United States)	Mitchell, Leilani	5' 5" (1.65m)	138 lb (63kg)	1985-06-15	Utah	9
F	14	(United States)	Peters, Devereaux	6' 2" (1.88m)	174 lb (79kg)	1989-10-08	Notre Dame	5
C	0	(United States)	Robinson, Angel	6' 6" (1.98m)	193 lb (88kg)	1987-04-20	Georgia	2
G	8	(Australia)	Talbot, Stephanie	6' 2" (1.88m)	192 lb (87kg)	1990-12-20	Australia	1
G/F	3	(United States)	Taurasi, Diana	6' 0" (1.83m)	163 lb (74kg)	1982-06-11	Connecticut	13
G	6	(United States)	Turner, Yvonne	5' 10" (1.78m)	131 lb (59kg)	1987-10-13	Nebraska	2

Head coach
(Australia) Sandy Brondello (Western Sydney)
Assistant coaches
(United States) Julie Hairgrove (Arizona)
(United States) Todd Troxel (Doane)
Strength and conditioning coach
(United States) Jonathan Mak (Illinois State)

Legend

- (C) Team captain
- (DP) Unsigned draft pick
- (FA) Free agent
- (S) Suspended
- Injured

== Game log ==
=== Pre-season ===
2018 pre-season game log
May: 0–2 (Home: 0–1; Road: 0–1)

Game	Date	Team	Score	High points	High rebounds	High assists	Location Attendance	Record
1	May 8	@ Seattle	L 69–73	Bonner (13)	Tied (6)	3 Tied (3)	KeyArena; 3,502	0–1
2	May 12	Seattle	L 61–84	Griner (14)	Lyttle (11)	Bonner (4)	Talking Stick Resort Arena; 4,535	0–2

2018 pre-season schedule

=== Regular season ===
2018 game log
Total: 20–14 (Home: 9–8; Road: 11–6)
May: 2–3 (Home: 1–2; Road: 1–1)

Game	Date	Team	Score	High points	High rebounds	High assists	Location Attendance	Record
1	May 18	Dallas	W 86–78	Taurasi (26)	Bonner (12)	Mitchell (5)	Talking Stick Resort Arena; 11,210	1–0
2	May 20	@ Seattle	W 87–82	Griner (29)	Griner (10)	Bonner (7)	KeyArena; 8,602	2–0
3	May 23	Seattle	L 71–87	Taurasi (23)	Bonner (9)	Lyttle (4)	Talking Stick Resort Arena; 8,068	2–1
4	May 27	@ Los Angeles	L 72–80	Lyttle (20)	Tied (5)	January (7)	Staples Center; 11,201	2–2
5	May 30	Washington	L 95–103	Griner (27)	Lyttle (7)	Taurasi (7)	Talking Stick Resort Arena; 8,188	2–3

June : 11–2 (Home: 3–1; Road: 8–1)

Game	Date	Team	Score	High points	High rebounds	High assists	Location Attendance	Record
6	June 1	@ Minnesota	W 95–85	Taurasi (29)	Griner (9)	Taurasi (6)	Target Center; 8,830	3–3
7	June 3	@ Atlanta	W 78–71	Tied (20)	Tied (7)	Taurasi (8)	McCamish Pavilion; 3,796	4–3
8	June 5	@ New York	W 80–74	Griner (26)	Griner (6)	Taurasi (8)	Madison Square Garden; 7,215	5–3
9	June 8	Chicago	W 96–79	Griner (24)	Griner (8)	Taurasi (7)	Talking Stick Resort Arena; 8,834	6–3
10	June 10	Las Vegas	W 72–66	Taurasi (25)	Griner (15)	January (4)	Talking Stick Resort Arena; 8,471	7–3
11	June 12	@ Dallas	W 75–72	Taurasi (21)	Lyttle (10)	January (6)	College Park Center; 4,026	8–3
12	June 16	Connecticut	W 89–72	Taurasi (19)	Tied (9)	January (8)	Talking Stick Resort Arena; 12,497	9–3
13	June 17	@ Las Vegas	W 92–80	Taurasi (28)	Bonner (9)	Taurasi (7)	Mandalay Bay Events Center; 4,432	10–3
14	June 22	Minnesota	L 72–83	Taurasi (23)	Griner (13)	Taurasi (6)	Talking Stick Resort Arena; 11,349	10–4
15	June 24	@ Chicago	L 88–97	Griner (19)	Griner (10)	Taurasi (8)	Wintrust Arena; 4,741	10–5
16	June 26	@ New York	W 83–69	Taurasi (27)	Griner (9)	Taurasi (7)	Westchester County Center; 1,839	11–5
17	June 29	@ Indiana	W 95–77	Taurasi (25)	Bonner (9)	Turner (7)	Bankers Life Fieldhouse; 7,241	12–5
18	June 30	@ Washington	W 84–74	Griner (24)	Turner (9)	Taurasi (9)	Capital One Arena; 6,218	13–5

July : 2–7 (Home: 1–4; Road: 1–3)

Game	Date	Team	Score	High points	High rebounds	High assists	Location Attendance	Record
19	July 5	Connecticut	W 84–77	Taurasi (25)	Bonner (13)	Turner (5)	Talking Stick Resort Arena; 8,599	14–5
20	July 8	@ Atlanta	L 70–76	Taurasi (19)	Robinson (10)	3 Tied (3)	McCamish Pavilion; 3,952	14–6
21	July 10	@ Dallas	L 72–101	Griner (21)	Tied (4)	Mitchell (8)	College Park Center; 4,034	14–7
22	July 13	@ Connecticut	L 87–91	Taurasi (28)	Tied (7)	Tied (6)	Mohegan Sun Arena; 7,696	14–8
23	July 15	@ Indiana	W 101–82	Griner (36)	Griner (12)	Taurasi (7)	Bankers Life Fieldhouse; 6,302	15–8
24	July 19	Las Vegas	L 82–85	Taurasi (33)	Robinson (11)	Taurasi (6)	Talking Stick Resort Arena; 8,587	15–9
25	July 21	Minnesota	L 75–80	Bonner (29)	Little (6)	Talbot (3)	Talking Stick Resort Arena; 11,473	15–10
26	July 25	Chicago	L 87–101	Bonner (30)	Bonner (13)	January (7)	Talking Stick Resort Arena; 10,338	15–11
27	July 31	Seattle	L 91–102	Griner (25)	Griner (6)	Tied (7)	Talking Stick Resort Arena; 10,005	15–12

August : 5–2 (Home: 4–1; Road: 1–1)

Game	Date	Team	Score	High points	High rebounds	High assists	Location Attendance	Record
28	August 1	@ Las Vegas	W 104–93	Taurasi (37)	Bonner (14)	Taurasi (9)	Mandalay Bay Events Center; 5,129	16–12
29	August 5	@ Los Angeles	L 75–78	Griner (22)	Bonner (9)	January (9)	Staples Center; 19,076	16–13
30	August 7	Washington	L 98–103	Griner (35)	Griner (11)	Talbot (6)	Talking Stick Resort Arena; 7,769	16–14
31	August 10	Indiana	W 94–74	Tied (14)	Bonner (10)	Griner (4)	Talking Stick Resort Arena; 8,860	17–14
32	August 12	Los Angeles	W 86–78	Bonner (31)	Griner (13)	Taurasi (14)	Talking Stick Resort Arena; 10,618	18–14
33	August 17	Atlanta	W 104–95	Griner (33)	Griner (18)	Taurasi (14)	Talking Stick Resort Arena; 11,177	19–14
34	August 19	New York	W 96–85	Bonner (23)	Bonner (10)	Tied (5)	Talking Stick Resort Arena; 13,106	20–14

2018 season schedule

=== Playoffs ===
2018 playoff game log
Total: 4–3 (Home: 3–0; Road: 1–3)
First Round: 1–0 (Home: 1–0; Road: 0–0)

Game	Date	Team	Score	High points	High rebounds	High assists	Location Attendance	Series
1	August 21	Dallas	W 101–83	Bonner (29)	Tied (11)	Taurasi (12)	Wells Fargo Arena; 4,976	1–0

Second Round: 1–0 (Home: 0–0; Road: 1–0)

Game	Date	Team	Score	High points	High rebounds	High assists	Location Attendance	Series
1	August 23	@ Connecticut	W 96–86	Tied (27)	Bonner (18)	3 Tied (5)	Mohegan Sun Arena; 7,858	1–0

WNBA Semifinals: 2–3 (Home: 2–0; Road: 0–3)

Game	Date	Team	Score	High points	High rebounds	High assists	Location Attendance	Series
1	August 26	@ Seattle	L 87–91	Bonner (27)	Bonner (13)	Taurasi (6)	KeyArena; 9,686	0–1
2	August 28	@ Seattle	L 87–91 (OT)	Taurasi (28)	Griner (10)	Taurasi (8)	KeyArena; 9,686	0–2
3	August 31	Seattle	W 86–66	Bonner (27)	Bonner (11)	Turner (6)	Talking Stick Resort Arena; 15,185	1–2
4	September 2	Seattle	W 86–84	Griner (29)	Griner (12)	Taurasi (4)	Talking Stick Resort Arena; 8,137	2–2
5	September 4	@ Seattle	84–94	Griner (21)	Griner (9)	Griner (6)	KeyArena; 8,992	2–3

2018 playoff schedule

== Standings ==
#	Western Conference	W	L	PCT	GB	Home	Road	Conf.
1	Seattle Storm (1)	26	8	.765	–	13–4	13–4	11–5
2	Phoenix Mercury (5)	20	14	.588	6	9–8	11–6	8–8
3	Los Angeles Sparks (6)	19	15	.559	7	11–6	8–9	9–7
4	Minnesota Lynx (7)	18	16	.529	8	9–8	9–8	9–7
5	Dallas Wings (8)	15	19	.441	11	10–7	5–12	7–9
6	e –Las Vegas Aces	14	20	.412	12	8–9	6–11	4–12

== Playoffs ==
**First round** Single elimination (Aug. 21)
5	**Phoenix Mercury**	**101**
8	Dallas Wings	83
6	**Los Angeles Sparks**	**75**
7	Minnesota Lynx	68

**Second round** Single elimination (Aug. 23)
4	Connecticut Sun	86
5	**Phoenix Mercury**	**96**
3	**Washington Mystics**	**96**
6	Los Angeles Sparks	64

**Semifinals**; Best-of-5 (Aug. 26 – Sept. 4)
1	**Seattle Storm**	**3**
5	Phoenix Mercury	2
2	Atlanta Dream	2
3	**Washington Mystics**	**3**

**WNBA Finals**; Best-of-5 (Sept. 7 – Sept. 12)
1	**Seattle Storm**	**3**
3	Washington Mystics	0

Note: Teams re-seeded after second round and semi-finals.

- **Bold** – Game or series winner
- Italic – Team with home-court advantage

== Statistics ==
Legend
GP	Games played	GS	Games started	MPG	Minutes per game	RPG	Rebounds per game
APG	Assists per game	SPG	Steals per game	BPG	Blocks per game	PPG	Points per game
FG%	Field-goal percentage	3P%	3-point field-goal percentage	FT%	Free-throw percentage	TO	Turnovers per game
PF	Fouls per game		Team leader		League leader

=== Regular season ===
Player	GP	GS	MPG	FG%	3P%	FT%	RPG	APG	SPG	BPG	PPG
Diana Taurasi	33	33	30.0	.446	.383	.925	3.5	5.3	0.9	0.2	20.7
Brittney Griner	34	34	32.6	.544	.250	.800	7.7	2.1	0.5	2.6	20.5
DeWanna Bonner	34	34	32.9	.452	.313	.867	7.2	3.2	1.3	0.4	17.3
Sancho Lyttle	18	18	23.3	.540	.000	.875	5.3	1.4	0.9	0.4	7.9
Briann January	33	33	27.1	.423	.470	.806	2.1	3.3	0.6	0.1	7.0
Leilani Mitchell	31	0	14.9	.351	.341	.857	1.4	2.3	0.5	0.2	4.4
Yvonne Turner	32	3	13.3	.376	.324	.682	1.8	1.3	0.7	0.1	4.1
Stephanie Talbot	31	8	14.6	.464	.386	.905	1.9	1.3	0.5	0.3	3.7
Camille Little	33	7	16.2	.330	.258	.774	1.8	1.2	0.5	0.3	3.0
Angel Robinson	24	0	9.9	.452	.000	.850	3.0	0.5	0.2	0.3	2.3
Devereaux Peters	5	0	7.6	.333	.000	.000	1.6	0.4	0.0	0.0	1.6
Marie Gülich	23	0	5.0	.483	.000	.750	1.0	0.1	0.0	0.2	1.5

== Awards and honors ==
Recipient	Award	Date awarded	Ref.
Brittney Griner	WNBA Western Conference Player of the Week	June 11, 2018	
Diana Taurasi	WNBA Cares Community Assist Award – May	June 20, 2018	
Diana Taurasi	WNBA Western Conference Player of the Month – June	July 3, 2018	
Sandy Brondello	WNBA Coach of the Month Award – June	July 2, 2018	
Diana Taurasi	WNBA All-Star Selection	July 17, 2018	
DeWanna Bonner	WNBA All-Star Selection	July 17, 2018	
Brittney Griner	WNBA All-Star Selection	July 17, 2018	
DeWanna Bonner	WNBA Western Conference Player of the Week	August 20, 2018	
Diana Taurasi	WNBA Western Conference Player of the Month – August	August 20, 2018	
