= 2018 Connecticut Sun season =

- Head coach: Curt Miller
- Arena: Mohegan Sun Arena

Results
- Record: 21–13 (.618)
- Place: 3rd (Eastern)
- Playoff finish: 4th seed, Lost in Second Round to Phoenix Mercury 86–96

Media
- Television: NBC Sports Boston and WCCT-TV

The 2018 WNBA season is the 20th season for the Connecticut Sun franchise of the WNBA. It is also the 16th season for the franchise in Connecticut. The season tipped off on May 13.

The Sun got off to a strong start, going 3–0 in May. All three wins were at home. In June, the Sun started strong, winning their first 4 of 5. However, they lost 5 of their next 7 games to finish 6–6 on the month. That skid included a 1–4 road trip, where all losses came 4 of eventual top 5 playoff teams. Their up and down season continued into July, where the Sun were 5–6. July started with another tough road trip where the Sun went 1–3. From there the Sun couldn't get a streak going; losing 2 then winning 2 then losing 2 again. The Sun surged in August posting a 7–1 record, including going 6–0 at home. Their only loss came on the road to Chicago. The Sun finished 21–13, which earned them the 4th seed in the 2018 WNBA Playoffs. Their playoff run fell short when they lost at home in the second round 86–96. This was the Sun's only playoff game, as they earned a first round bye.

== Transactions ==
=== WNBA draft ===
Round	Pick	Player	Nationality	School/Team/Country
1	9	Lexie Brown	United States	Duke
3	33	Mikayla Cowling	United States	California

=== Trades/Roster Changes ===
Date	Details
February 2, 2018	Acquired C Cayla George via trade from the Phoenix Mercury in exchange for 21st pick in the 2018 WNBA Draft.
February 7, 2018	Signed G Leticia Romero
April 12, 2018	Sun receive Bria Holmes in exchange for 15th pick in 2018 WNBA Draft and a second round pick in 2019 WNBA draft.
July 9, 2018	Sun receive Layshia Clarendon and a second round pick in 2019 WNBA draft in exchange for Alex Bentley.

== Roster ==
2018 Connecticut Sun roster
Players
Coaches

Pos.	No.	Nat.	Name	Height	Weight	DOB	From	Yrs
G	1	(United States)	Banham, Rachel	5' 9" (1.75m)	168 lb (76kg)	1993-07-15	Minnesota	2
G	4	(United States)	Brown, Lexie	5' 9" (1.75m)		1994-10-27	Duke	R
G	23	(United States)	Clarendon, Layshia	5' 9" (1.75m)	158 lb (72kg)	1991-05-02	California	5
G	32	(United States)	Holmes, Bria	6' 1" (1.85m)	170 lb (77kg)	1994-04-19	West Virginia	2
F	35	(The Bahamas)	Jones, Jonquel	6' 6" (1.98m)	190 lb (86kg)	1994-01-05	George Washington	2
C	42	(United States)	Jones, Brionna	6' 3" (1.91m)	230 lb (104kg)	1995-12-18	Maryland	1
G/F	44	(United States)	Laney, Betnijah	6' 0" (1.83m)	160 lb (73kg)	1993-10-29	Rutgers	2
F	13	(United States)	Ogwumike, Chiney	6' 4" (1.93m)	173 lb (78kg)	1992-03-22	Stanford	2
G/F	40	(United States)	Stricklen, Shekinna	6' 2" (1.88m)	178 lb (81kg)	1990-07-30	Tennessee	6
F	25	(United States)	Thomas, Alyssa	6' 2" (1.88m)	185 lb (84kg)	1992-04-12	Maryland	4
G	5	(United States)	Thomas, Jasmine	5' 9" (1.75m)	145 lb (66kg)	1989-09-30	Duke	7
F	33	(United States)	Tuck, Morgan	6' 2" (1.88m)	200 lb (91kg)	1994-04-30	Connecticut	2
G	10	(United States)	Williams, Courtney	5' 8" (1.73m)	136 lb (62kg)	1994-05-11	South Florida	2

Head coach
(United States) Curt Miller (Baldwin Wallace)
Assistant coaches
(United States) Brandi Poole
(United States) Steve Smith

Legend

- (C) Team captain
- (DP) Unsigned draft pick
- (FA) Free agent
- (S) Suspended
- Injured

== Game log ==
=== Preseason ===
2018 pre-season game log
May: 3–0 (Home: 3–0; Road: 0–0)

Game	Date	Team	Score	High points	High rebounds	High assists	Location Attendance	Record
1	May 7	Los Angeles	W 68–65	J. Thomas (12)	Ogwumike (8)	Tied (2)	Mohegan Sun Arena	1–0
2	May 8	Dallas	W 79–58	Williams (18)	A. Thomas (12)	A. Thomas (5)	Mohegan Sun Arena; 3,695	2–0
3	May 11	Atlanta	W 74–58	Bentley (13)	3 Tied (5)	J. Thomas (3)	Webster Bank Arena; 1,610	3–0

2018 pre-season schedule

=== Regular season ===
2018 game log
Total: 21–13 (Home: 13–4; Road: 8–9)
May: 3–0 (Home: 3–0; Road: 0–0)

Game	Date	Team	Score	High points	High rebounds	High assists	Location Attendance	Record
1	May 20	Las Vegas	W 101–65	Bentley (18)	A. Thomas (17)	J. Thomas (6)	Mohegan Sun Arena; 6,637	1–0
2	May 24	Los Angeles	W 102–94	Ogwumike (18)	A. Thomas (9)	J. Thomas (8)	Mohegan Sun Arena; 5,571	2–0
3	May 26	Indiana	W 86–77	A. Thomas (21)	Ogwumike (8)	Williams (6)	Mohegan Sun Arena; 5,843	3–0

June : 6–6 (Home: 2–1; Road: 4–5)

Game	Date	Team	Score	High points	High rebounds	High assists	Location Attendance	Record
4	June 1	@ Chicago	W 110–72	Tied (20)	A. Thomas (13)	J. Thomas (8)	Wintrust Arena; 4,131	4–0
5	June 3	@ Washington	W 88–64	J. Thomas (25)	Williams (10)	A. Thomas (4)	Capital One Arena; 5,176	5–0
6	June 5	@ Atlanta	L 77–82	A. Thomas (19)	A. Thomas (17)	A. Thomas (7)	McCamish Pavilion; 2,830	5–1
7	June 7	@ New York	W 88–86	J. Thomas (19)	3 Tied (9)	J. Thomas (8)	Westchester County Center; 1,581	6–1
8	June 9	Minnesota	W 89–75	Williams (22)	Tied (11)	Tied (4)	Mohegan Sun Arena; 6,771	7–1
9	June 13	Washington	L 91–95	Williams (34)	Ogwumike (13)	J. Thomas (5)	Mohegan Sun Arena	7–2
10	June 15	@ Seattle	L 92–103	Ogwumike (30)	J. Jones (8)	J. Thomas (6)	KeyArena; 7,094	7–3
11	June 16	@ Phoenix	L 72–89	Tuck (20)	Williams (6)	Banham (4)	Talking Stick Resort Arena; 12,497	7–4
12	June 22	@ Atlanta	L 70–75	Bentley (18)	J. Jones (7)	Tied (4)	McCamish Pavilion; 4,047	7–5
13	June 24	@ Indiana	W 87–78	Banham (20)	B. Jones (10)	Bentley (6)	Bankers Life Fieldhouse; 5,458	8–5
14	June 26	@ Washington	L 80–92	Ogwumike (17)	Ogwumike (11)	Bentley (6)	Capital One Arena; 4,139	8–6
15	June 27	Indiana	W 101–89	Tied (21)	Ogwumike (10)	J. Thomas (6)	Mohegan Sun Arena; 5,112	9–6

July : 5–6 (Home: 2–3; Road: 3–3)

Game	Date	Team	Score	High points	High rebounds	High assists	Location Attendance	Record
16	July 1	@ Seattle	L 70–84	Bentley (15)	4 Tied (6)	Bentley (4)	KeyArena; 9,307	9–7
17	July 3	@ Los Angeles	W 73–72	Ogwumike (21)	Tied (7)	Banham (6)	Staples Center; 6,280	10–7
18	July 5	@ Phoenix	L 77–84	3 Tied (11)	Tuck (8)	3 Tied (3)	Talking Stick Resort Arena; 8,599	10–8
19	July 7	@ Las Vegas	L 90–94	Tuck (20)	Ogwumike (11)	J. Thomas (8)	Mandalay Bay Events Center; 3,363	10–9
20	July 11	New York	L 76–79	Ogwumike (17)	A. Thomas (10)	Williams (5)	Mohegan Sun Arena; 7,413	10–10
21	July 13	Phoenix	W 91–87	Williams (25)	Williams (10)	A. Thomas (10)	Mohegan Sun Arena; 7,696	11–10
22	July 15	@ Minnesota	W 83–64	Tuck (15)	Williams (8)	Clarendon (5)	Target Center; 9,234	12–10
23	July 17	Atlanta	L 83–86	J. Jones (19)	A. Thomas (10)	J. Thomas (6)	Mohegan Sun Arena; 5,555	12–11
24	July 20	Seattle	L 65–78	Ogwumike (21)	Ogwumike (12)	Banham (5)	Mohegan Sun Arena; 7,908	12–12
25	July 22	@ Dallas	W 92–75	Stricklen (24)	A. Thomas (8)	J. Thomas (9)	College Park Center; 4,935	13–12
26	July 24	Washington	W 94–68	J. Jones (23)	Williams (10)	Williams (6)	Mohegan Sun Arena; 5,125	14–12

August : 7–1 (Home: 6–0; Road: 1–1)

Game	Date	Team	Score	High points	High rebounds	High assists	Location Attendance	Record
27	August 1	New York	W 92–77	J. Jones (21)	A. Thomas (12)	Williams (6)	Mohegan Sun Arena; 6,412	15–12
28	August 5	Las Vegas	W 109–88	J. Thomas (30)	Tied (7)	Williams (5)	Mohegan Sun Arena; 6,791	16–12
29	August 8	@ Dallas	W 101–92	A. Thomas (22)	Williams (10)	J. Thomas (9)	College Park Center; 3,483	17–12
30	August 10	@ Chicago	L 86–97	Ogwumike (18)	Tied (6)	Tied (3)	Wintrust Arena; 5,976	17–13
31	August 12	Chicago	W 82–75	Williams (22)	J. Jones (15)	J. Thomas (8)	Mohegan Sun Arena; 7,687	18–13
32	August 14	Dallas	W 96–76	J. Jones (27)	J. Jones (10)	J. Thomas (7)	Mohegan Sun Arena; 6,365	19–13
33	August 17	Minnesota	W 96–79	J. Jones (26)	Tied (8)	A. Thomas (8)	Mohegan Sun Arena; 7,089	20–13
34	August 19	Los Angeles	W 89–86	J. Thomas (27)	J. Jones (9)	J. Jones (7)	Mohegan Sun Arena; 8,040	21–13

2018 season schedule

=== Playoffs ===
2018 playoff game log
Total: 0–1(Home: 0–1; Road: 0–0)
WNBA Second Round: 0–1 (Home: 0–1; Road: 0–0)

Game	Date	Team	Score	High points	High rebounds	High assists	Location Attendance	Series
1	August 23	Phoenix	L 86–96	Williams (27)	Williams (8)	J. Jones (7)	Mohegan Sun Arena; 7,858	0–1

2018 playoff schedule

== Standings ==
#	Eastern Conference	W	L	PCT	GB	Home	Road	Conf.
1	Atlanta Dream (2)	23	11	.676	–	13–4	10–7	12–4
2	Washington Mystics (3)	22	12	.647	1	12–5	10–7	12–4
3	Connecticut Sun (4)	21	13	.618	2	13–4	8–9	9–7
4	e – Chicago Sky	13	21	.382	10	7–10	6–11	6–10
5	e – New York Liberty	7	27	.206	16	4–13	3–14	6–10
6	e – Indiana Fever	6	28	.176	17	2–15	4–13	3–13

== Playoffs ==
**First round** Single elimination (Aug. 21)
5	**Phoenix Mercury**	**101**
8	Dallas Wings	83
6	**Los Angeles Sparks**	**75**
7	Minnesota Lynx	68

**Second round** Single elimination (Aug. 23)
4	Connecticut Sun	86
5	**Phoenix Mercury**	**96**
3	**Washington Mystics**	**96**
6	Los Angeles Sparks	64

**Semifinals**; Best-of-5 (Aug. 26 – Sept. 4)
1	**Seattle Storm**	**3**
5	Phoenix Mercury	2
2	Atlanta Dream	2
3	**Washington Mystics**	**3**

**WNBA Finals**; Best-of-5 (Sept. 7 – Sept. 12)
1	**Seattle Storm**	**3**
3	Washington Mystics	0

Note: Teams re-seeded after second round and semi-finals.

- **Bold** – Game or series winner
- Italic – Team with home-court advantage

== Awards and honors ==
Recipient	Award	Date awarded	Ref.
Alyssa Thomas	WNBA Eastern Conference Player of the Week	May 29, 2018	
Chiney Ogwumike	WNBA All-Star Selection	July 17, 2018	
Jonquel Jones	WNBA Eastern Conference Player of the Week	August 20, 2018	
Jonquel Jones	WNBA Sixth Woman of the Year Award	August 23, 2018	

== Statistics ==
Legend
GP	Games played	GS	Games started	MPG	Minutes per game	RPG	Rebounds per game
APG	Assists per game	SPG	Steals per game	BPG	Blocks per game	PPG	Points per game
FG%	Field-goal percentage	3P%	3-point field-goal percentage	FT%	Free-throw percentage	TO	Turnovers per game
PF	Fouls per game		Team leader		League leader

=== Regular season ===
Player	GP	GS	MPG	FG%	3P%	FT%	RPG	APG	SPG	BPG	PPG
Chiney Ogwumike	31	31	25.5	.603	.500	.797	7.3	1.0	1.2	0.6	14.4
Jasmine Thomas	34	34	28.1	.398	.311	.855	3.3	4.8	1.1	0.2	12.9
Courtney Williams	30	29	27.1	.456	.377	.680	5.9	3.0	0.8	0.1	12.6
Jonquel Jones	34	16	20.5	.550	.467	.671	5.5	1.7	0.1	1.2	11.8
Alyssa Thomas	24	24	30.6	.464	.000	.547	8.1	4.2	1.2	0.4	10.3
Shekinna Stricklen	34	30	18.8	.430	.430	.857	2.3	0.5	0.6	0.1	6.6
Morgan Tuck	34	1	13.6	.473	.349	.826	2.3	0.5	0.4	0.1	5.9
Layshia Clarendon	15	0	15.9	.492	.000	.826	1.6	2.7	0.5	0.0	5.4
Rachel Banham	33	5	12.8	.414	.370	.868	0.9	1.5	0.5	0.1	5.2
Brionna Jones	27	0	9.0	.469	.000	.727	2.0	0.2	0.2	0.2	3.1
Betnijah Laney	29	0	9.3	.471	.111	.909	1.7	0.7	0.4	0.0	2.7
Lexie Brown	22	0	5.6	.273	.310	.571	0.8	0.5	0.3	0.0	1.7
