= Morgan Tuck =

American basketball player (born 1994)

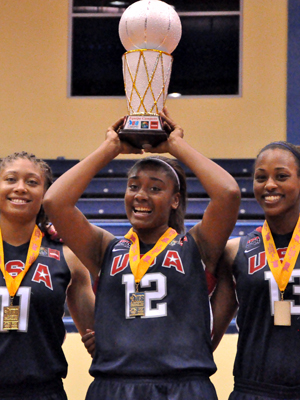
- Tuck in 2012

Houston Comets
- Title: General manager
- League: WNBA

Personal information
- Born: April 30, 1994 (age 32) Grand Rapids, Michigan, US
- Listed height: 6 ft 2 in (1.88 m)
- Listed weight: 207 lb (94 kg)

Career information
- High school: Bolingbrook (Bolingbrook, Illinois)
- College: UConn (2012–2016)
- WNBA draft: 2016: 1st round, 3rd overall pick
- Drafted by: Connecticut Sun
- Playing career: 2016–2020
- Position: Power forward
- Number: 33, 3

Career history
- 2016–2019: Connecticut Sun
- 2018–2019: Beijing Great Wall
- 2020: Seattle Storm

Career highlights
- WNBA Champion (2020); 4× NCAA champion (2013–2016); WBCA Coaches' All-American (2016); Second-team All-American – AP (2016); 2× First-team All-AAC (2015, 2016); Parade All-American (2012); WBCA High School All-American (2012); McDonald's All-American (2012); Gatorade Illinois Girls Basketball Player of the Year (2012); MaxPreps All-America first team (2012); USA Today All-USA first team (2012); 2× Illinois Miss Basketball (2009, 2012); USA Today All-USA third team (2011); ESPN Rise Sophomore of the Year (2010); USA Today All-USA second team (2010); ESPN Rise Freshman of the Year (2009)
- Stats at WNBA.com
- Stats at Basketball Reference
Medals
Women's basketball
Representing the United States
World Cup
Gold medal – first place	2018 Spain
FIBA Under-19 World Cup
Gold medal – first place	2013 Lithuania	Team
Gold medal – first place	2011 Chile	Team
FIBA Under-18 Americas Championship
Gold medal – first place	2012 Puerto Rico	Team
FIBA Under-17 World Cup
Gold medal – first place	2010 France	Team

Morgan Tuck (born April 30, 1994) is an American former professional basketball player who is currently the general manager of the Houston Comets. She was the general manager of the Connecticut Sun. She played her first four WNBA seasons with the Connecticut Sun. She won 4 consecutive NCAA championships with the University of Connecticut. She completed her high school career at Bolingbrook High School in Bolingbrook, Illinois. She played on the USA Basketball U17, U18 and U19 teams, where she helped each team win a gold medal.

== Early years ==
Born in Grand Rapids, Michigan, Tuck played from an early age, but didn't think she was very good at it. She got better, and was good enough to earn a roster spot on the USA U16 team, although a knee injury prevented her from competing as a part of that team. Her high school teams had a combined record of 83–7 in her first three seasons, each of which culminated in a state championship. She was named Freshman of the Year by ESPN Rise in 2009, as well as Sophomore of the Year in 2010. Her senior year, the team had a record of 27–2, reaching the supersectionals, and failing to win the state title for the first time in her career. She averaged 27.7 points and 10.2 rebounds per game as a senior. She earned the title of Ms. Basketball for the state of Illinois twice, once as a freshman and again as a senior. Only two other players had won the award twice at that time: Cappie Pondexter and Candace Parker.

== Tournament of Champions ==
The Tournament of Champions is an annual event, since 1997, showcasing the best high school girls basketball teams. The 2011 event, held in Phoenix, Arizona included 96 of the best basketball programs in the country. Bolingbrook, considered to be the number 1 team by USA Today, was assigned to the Smith Division, where they faced Cicero – North Syracuse High School (C-NS). The C-NS team, beat Bolingbrook 43–40 for their only loss of the tournament. After the loss to C-NS, Bolingbrook faced St. Mary's (Stockton, Calif.) Tuck put up 35 points, and dominated post play to help her team defeat St. Mary's 60–39. Tuck earned a place on the All-Tournament team, helped in part by a 35-point and 14 rebound performance against a team from Texas. She scored 35 points in two different games in the tournament.

== High School Coaches' All-America Team ==
Tuck was selected to the 2012 Women's Basketball Coaches Association High School Coaches' All-America Team. The top twenty high school players in the country are named as WBCA All-Americans, and eligible to play in the all-star game. She participated in the 2012 WBCA High School All-America Game, scoring eight points.

== USA Basketball ==
Tuck earned a spot on the U17 team in 2010. Coach Katie Meier named Tuck one of the two captains of the team, along with Breanna Stewart. The team competed in the 2010 FIBA U17 World Championship for Women, held in Rodez & Toulouse, France. Tuck earned a starting position in five of the eight games, and was the leading scorer in the game against Turkey. She helped the team win all eight games and earn the gold medal in the competition.

She continued her USA Basketball career with a position on the U19 team which competed in Puerto Montt, Chile in July 2011. Tuck started five of the nine games played. The team lost one game to Canada, but earned a spot in the medal round. The team beat France, then Brazil, and faced Spain in the gold-medal game. The lead changed several times in the early minutes, but the USA team opened up a larger lead, and won the gold medal.

Tuck was named to the USA U18 team in 2012. The team was competing at the 2012 FIBA Americas U18 Championship for Women, held in Gurabo, Puerto Rico in August 2012. The team dominated the preliminary rounds, winning each of the three games by at least 40 points. In the semifinal game against Canada, Tuck hit nine of twelve field goal attempts and scored 22 points to lead all scorers, and help the USA team defeat Canada 95–46. In the gold-medal game against Brazil, the team found itself in unfamiliar territory—losing by double digits. Brazil opened on a 9–0 run and extended the lead to 18–7. The USA teams settled down and chipped away at the lead, eventually winning 71–47. Tuck was the high scorer for the game with 15 points. She also earned scoring honors for the entire tournament, scoring 17.8 points per game to become the leading scorer for the tournament.

=== 2013 U19 – Lithuania ===
Tuck, along with teammates Moriah Jefferson and Breanna Stewart, were three of the twelve players selected to be on the team representing the US at the U19 World Championship for Women held in Klaipėda and Panevėžys, Lithuania in July 2013.

== College statistics ==
Legend
GP	Games played	GS	Games started	MPG	Minutes per game
FG%	Field goal percentage	3P%	3-point field goal percentage	FT%	Free throw percentage
RPG	Rebounds per game	APG	Assists per game	SPG	Steals per game
BPG	Blocks per game	PPG	Points per game	**Bold**	Career high

Year	Team	GP	Points	FG%	3P%	FT%	RPG	APG	SPG	BPG	PPG
2012–13	Connecticut	35	225	45.4	28.9	66.7	3.4	1.3	0.5	0.3	6.4
2013–14	Connecticut	8	60	49.0	**41.2**	55.6	2.4	1.0	0.5	0.1	7.5
2014–15	Connecticut	**39**	**562**	**59.6**	29.2	75.0	5.5	2.9	0.8	0.3	**14.4**
2015–16	Connecticut	33	451	51.6	32.2	**78.8**	**5.7**	**3.5**	0.8	0.3	13.7
Career	Connecticut	115	1298	53.5	31.2	73.7	4.7	2.5	0.7	0.3	11.3

== Professional career ==
=== WNBA ===
Tuck was drafted 3rd overall by the Connecticut Sun in the 2016 WNBA draft. During her rookie season, she was a reserve for the Sun, averaging seven points per game and 2.8 rebounds per game in 26 games with three starts. In a win against the Seattle Storm, she scored a career-high 20 points off the bench for the Sun. In the last of month of the regular season, Tuck sustained a right knee injury and was ruled out for the rest of the season.

In 2017, Tuck made her return from her knee injury on the 2017 season home opener. She scored a new career-high of 21 points in the Sun's starting lineup in an 81–74 loss to the Atlanta Dream. After the first five games, Tuck would be ruled out for nearly two months due to a bruise on her right knee. She would make her return on July 12, 2017, and was moved to the bench with less playing time following the injury. The Sun finished as the fourth seed, making the playoffs for the first time in five years. They received a bye to the second round elimination game, but they were eliminated by the Phoenix Mercury in the second round.

In 2018, Tuck would be fully healthy for the season. She played all 34 games for the first time in her career while taking a bench role. The Sun were the fourth seed in the league with a bye to the second round elimination game. The Sun would lose yet again to the Mercury in the second round.

In 2019, Tuck played 33 regular season games for a Sun team that went 23–11 to clinch the second seed. In the second round the Sun swept the Los Angeles Sparks to advance to the finals, where they were defeated by the Washington Mystics.

Prior to the 2020 WNBA season, Tuck was traded to the Seattle Storm, where she was reunited with her former UConn teammate, Breanna Stewart.

Prior to the start of the 2021 WNBA season, Tuck announced her retirement from the WNBA on March 15, 2021, citing the multiple knee injuries she has had over the years as a main factor in her decision.

=== Overseas ===
In 2018, Tuck signed with Beijing Great Wall of the Women's Chinese Basketball Association for the 2018-19 off-season.

== Connecticut Sun/Houston Comets ==
In December 2024, Tuck, who had been the director of franchise development was promoted to become the general manager of the Connecticut Sun.

== WNBA career statistics ==
Legend
GP	Games played	GS	Games started	MPG	Minutes per game	RPG	Rebounds per game
APG	Assists per game	SPG	Steals per game	BPG	Blocks per game	PPG	Points per game
TO	Turnovers per game	FG%	Field-goal percentage	3P%	3-point field-goal percentage	FT%	Free-throw percentage
**Bold**	Career best	°	League leader

†	Denotes seasons in which Tuck won a WNBA championship

=== Regular season ===
Year	Team	GP	GS	MPG	FG%	3P%	FT%	RPG	APG	SPG	BPG	TO	PPG
2016	Connecticut	26	3	**16.7**	.414	.304	.711	**2.8**	**1.1**	0.3	0.0	0.9	**7.0**
2017	Connecticut	22	**5**	16.6	.354	.289	.810	2.2	0.3	0.3	0.0	1.0	5.4
2018	Connecticut	**34**	1	13.6	.**473**	.349	.**826**	2.3	0.5	**0.4**	**0.1**	0.7	5.9
2019	Connecticut	33	0	10.7	.388	**.357**	.600	2.0	0.8	0.3	0.0	0.9	3.7
2020†	Seattle	10	0	8.8	.313	.222	.625	0.6	0.2	0.5	0.0	**0.6**	1.7
Career	5 years, 2 teams	125	9	13.6	.410	.322	.717	2.2	0.8	0.4	0.1	0.9	5.1

=== Postseason ===
Year	Team	GP	GS	MPG	FG%	3P%	FT%	RPG	APG	SPG	BPG	TO	PPG
2017	Connecticut	1	0	3.7	**1.000**	–	**.500**	1.0	**1.0**	0.0	0.0	**0.0**	**3.0**
2018	Connecticut	1	0	**9.3**	.200	.000	–	**2.0**	0.0	0.0	0.0	**0.0**	2.0
2019	Connecticut	**7**	0	8.6	.304	.000	–	1.0	0.3	**0.2**	**0.1**	0.1	2.0
2020†	Seattle	1	0	7.0	.200	.000	–	1.0	**1.0**	0.0	0.0	**0.0**	2.0
Career	4 years, 2 teams	10	0	8.0	.294	.000	.500	1.1	0.4	0.2	0.1	0.1	2.1

== Awards and honors ==
- 2020 WNBA Champion, Seattle Storm
- 4x NCAA Champion (2012–2016)
- 2012—Parade All-American
- 2012—McDonald's High School All-American
- 2012—WBCA High School All-American
- 2012—Gatorade Illinois Girls Basketball Player of the Year
- 2012—MaxPreps All-America first team
- 2012—USA Today All-USA first team
- 2012—Illinois Ms. Basketball
- 2011–12 Herald-News Girls Basketball Player of the Year
- 2011—USA Today All-USA third team
- 2010—USA Today All-USA second team
- 2010—ESPN Rise Sophomore of the Year
- 2009—Illinois Ms. Basketball
- 2009—ESPN Rise Freshman of the Year
