= 2018 Las Vegas Aces season =

- Head coach: Bill Laimbeer
- Arena: Mandalay Bay Events Center

Results
- Record: 14–20 (.412)
- Place: 6th (Western)
- Playoff finish: Did not qualify

Media
- Television: AT&T SportsNet Rocky Mountain, ESPN2, NBATV

The 2018 Las Vegas Aces season was the franchise's 22nd season in the Women's National Basketball Association. This was the franchise's inaugural season in Las Vegas - after relocating from San Antonio and Utah. The season tipped off on May 20, 2018 and was also the first season under head coach Bill Laimbeer.

The team started the season slowly in May, posting an 0–4 record. June was a month of improvement, as the Aces went 6–7, including a win over Seattle away. July was the team's best month of the year. The Aces posted a 6–2 record, with their only 2 losses being to Los Angeles. The team's playoff push fell short in August, when the team posted a 2–7 record including the league's first forfeited game. Ultimately the forfeit proved costly, as the team missed out on the playoffs by 1 game and finished 9th in the league overall.

== Transactions ==
=== WNBA draft ===
Round	Pick	Player	Nationality	School/Team/Country
1	1	A'ja Wilson	United States	South Carolina
2	13	Jaime Nared	United States	Tennessee
3	25	Raigyne Louis	United States	LSU
3	32	Jill Barta	United States	Gonzaga

=== Trades/Roster Changes ===
Date	Details
February 1, 2018	Signed F Tamera Young
February 1, 2018	Signed C Carolyn Swords
February 1, 2018	Received Indiana Fever's 2nd round pick in 2019 WNBA draft in exchange for C Kayla Alexander and Las Vegas Aces' 3rd round pick in the 2019 WNBA Draft.
February 2, 2018	Received C Kelsey Bone from Phoenix Mercury in exchange for the 26th pick in the 2018 WNBA Draft and Las Vegas Aces' 2nd round pick in the 2019 WNBA Draft.
February 26, 2018	Re-signed G/F Sequoia Holmes, F Cierra Burdick, Signed F Ivey Slaughter
March 13, 2018	Re-signed G Sydney Colson
March 20, 2018	Re-signed F Valériane Ayayi
April 11, 2018	Signed G Jacki Gemelos
May 19, 2018	Signed G Lindsay Allen
May 23, 2018	Signed G Kelsey Plum and G Kayla McBride

== Roster ==
2018 Las Vegas Aces roster
Players
Coaches

Pos.	No.	Nat.	Name	Height	Weight	DOB	From	Yrs
G	15	(United States)	Allen, Lindsay	5' 8" (1.73m)	144 lb (65kg)	1995-03-20	Notre Dame	1
C	3	(United States)	Bone, Kelsey	6' 4" (1.93m)	220 lb (100kg)	1991-12-31	Texas A&M	4
F	12	(United States)	Coffey, Nia	6' 1" (1.85m)	180 lb (82kg)	1995-05-21	Northwestern	1
F	5	(United States)	Hamby, Dearica	6' 3" (1.91m)	189 lb (86kg)	1993-11-06	Wake Forest	3
C	20	(United States)	Harrison, Isabelle	6' 3" (1.91m)	183 lb (83kg)	1993-09-27	Tennessee	2
G	4	(United States)	Jefferson, Moriah	5' 6" (1.68m)	123 lb (56kg)	1994-03-08	Connecticut	2
G	21	(United States)	McBride, Kayla	5' 10" (1.78m)	174 lb (79kg)	1992-06-25	Notre Dame	4
G/F	31	(United States)	Nared, Jaime	6' 2" (1.88m)	160 lb (73kg)	1995-09-14	Tennessee	R
C	19	(South Korea)	Park Ji-su	6' 5" (1.96m)	206 lb (93kg)	1998-12-06	South Korea	R
G	10	(United States)	Plum, Kelsey	5' 8" (1.73m)	145 lb (66kg)	1994-08-24	Washington	1
C	8	(United States)	Swords, Carolyn	6' 6" (1.98m)	215 lb (98kg)	1989-07-18	Boston College	6
C	22	(United States)	Wilson, A'ja	6' 4" (1.93m)	195 lb (88kg)	1996-08-08	South Carolina	R
F	1	(United States)	Young, Tamera	6' 2" (1.88m)	175 lb (79kg)	1986-10-30	James Madison	10

Head coach
(United States) Bill Laimbeer (Notre Dame)
Assistant coaches
(United States) Vickie Johnson (Louisiana Tech)
(Canada) Kelly Raimon
Strength and conditioning coach
(United States) Laura Ramus (Wayne State (MI))

Legend

- (C) Team captain
- (DP) Unsigned draft pick
- (FA) Free agent
- (S) Suspended
- Injured

== Game log ==
=== Pre-season ===
2018 pre-season game log
May: 1–1 (Home: 1–0; Road: 0–1)

Game	Date	Team	Score	High points	High rebounds	High assists	Location Attendance	Record
1	May 6	China	W 98–63	Wilson (20)	Tied (7)	Tied (5)	Mandalay Bay Events Center	1–0
2	May 13	@ Dallas	L 55–68	Young (11)	Wilson (12)	Slaughter (3)	College Park Center	1–1

2018 pre-season schedule

=== Regular season ===
2018 game log
Total: 14–20 (Home: 8–9; Road: 6–11)
May: 0–4 (Home: 0–1; Road: 0–3)

Game	Date	Team	Score	High points	High rebounds	High assists	Location Attendance	Record
1	May 20	@ Connecticut	L 65–101	Young (23)	Wilson (10)	Bone (3)	Mohegan Sun Arena; 6,637	0–1
2	May 22	@ Washington	L 70–75	Wilson (16)	Wilson (8)	Allen (6)	Capital One Arena; 4,509	0–2
3	May 27	Seattle	L 98–105	Wilson (27)	Wilson (8)	Allen (6)	Mandalay Bay Events Center; 7,662	0–3
4	May 31	@ Seattle	L 74–101	Wilson (21)	Tied (6)	Plum (6)	KeyArena; 5,235	0–4

June : 6–7 (Home: 3–4; Road: 3–3)

Game	Date	Team	Score	High points	High rebounds	High assists	Location Attendance	Record
5	June 1	Washington	W 85–73	Wilson (26)	Wilson (12)	Tied (4)	Mandalay Bay Events Center; 5,575	1–4
6	June 3	@ Chicago	L 90–95	Wilson (22)	Park (6)	Allen (8)	Wintrust Arena; 5,052	1–5
7	June 8	Atlanta	L 83–87	Wilson (20)	Wilson (9)	Allen (7)	Mandalay Bay Events Center; 5,913	1–6
8	June 10	@ Phoenix	L 66–72	Wilson (17)	Park (11)	Plum (6)	Talking Stick Resort Arena; 8,471	1–7
9	June 12	@ Indiana	W 101–92 (OT)	Wilson (35)	Wilson (13)	Young (9)	Bankers Life Fieldhouse; 5,437	2–7
10	June 13	@ New York	W 78–63	Hamby (17)	Tied (4)	Allen (7)	Westchester County Center; 1,419	3–7
11	June 15	@ Dallas	L 67–77	McBride (22)	Young (9)	Young (4)	College Park Center; 4,549	3–8
12	June 17	Phoenix	L 80–92	Wilson (21)	Coffey (12)	Plum (5)	Mandalay Bay Events Center; 4,432	3–9
13	June 19	@ Seattle	W 87–77	Wilson (25)	Wilson (15)	Tied (6)	KeyArena; 6,395	4–9
14	June 22	New York	W 88–78	McBride (27)	Wilson (14)	Wilson (4)	Mandalay Bay Events Center; 5,478	5–9
15	June 24	Minnesota	L 73–88	McBride (18)	Wilson (7)	Plum (5)	Mandalay Bay Events Center; 4,814	5–10
16	June 27	Dallas	L 91–97	McBride (38)	Wilson (15)	Wilson (8)	Mandalay Bay Events Center; 5,246	5–11
17	June 29	Los Angeles	W 94–78	Wilson (29)	Tied (9)	Tied (5)	Mandalay Bay Events Center; 5,124	6–11

July : 6–2 (Home: 3–1; Road: 3–1)

Game	Date	Team	Score	High points	High rebounds	High assists	Location Attendance	Record
18	July 1	@ Los Angeles	L 71–87	Young (16)	Park (6)	Young (8)	Staples Center; 12,003	6–12
19	July 5	Chicago	W 84–80	McBride (28)	Swords (12)	McBride (7)	Mandalay Bay Events Center; 4,699	7–12
20	July 7	Connecticut	W 94–90	Wilson (34)	Wilson (14)	Plum (10)	Mandalay Bay Events Center; 3,363	8–12
21	July 10	@ Chicago	W 98–74	McBride (18)	Tied (8)	3 Tied (4)	Wintrust Arena; 7,696	9–12
22	July 13	@ Minnesota	W 85–77	McBride (24)	Wilson (15)	McBride (9)	Target Center; 9,813	10–12
23	July 15	Los Angeles	L 78–99	McBride (18)	Tied (8)	Jefferson (3)	Mandalay Bay Events Center; 4,810	10–13
24	July 19	@ Phoenix	W 85–82	McBride (27)	Wilson (12)	McBride (3)	Talking Stick Resort Arena; 8,587	11–13
25	July 22	Indiana	W 88–74	Wilson (24)	Tied (10)	3 Tied (4)	Mandalay Bay Events Center; 5,368	12–13

August : 2–7 (Home: 2–3; Road: 0–4)

Game	Date	Team	Score	High points	High rebounds	High assists	Location Attendance	Record
26	August 1	Phoenix	L 93–104	Wilson (29)	3 Tied (6)	Tied (5)	Mandalay Bay Events Center; 5,129	12–14
27	August 3	@ Washington	L via forfeit	–	–	–	Capital One Arena; 0	12–15
28	August 5	@ Connecticut	L 88–109	Wilson (24)	5 Tied (3)	Tied (4)	Mohegan Sun Arena; 6,791	12–16
29	August 7	@ Atlanta	L 100–109	Plum (20)	Swords (9)	Plum (13)	McCamish Pavilion; 4,033	12–17
30	August 9	Minnesota	L 73–89	Wilson (18)	Swords (7)	Young (4)	Mandalay Bay Events Center; 4,497	12–18
31	August 11	Indiana	W 92–74	Plum (20)	Wilson (8)	Tied (4)	Mandalay Bay Events Center; 5,213	13–18
32	August 15	New York	W 85–72	Wilson (19)	Young (8)	Young (4)	Mandalay Bay Events Center; 7,159	14–18
33	August 17	@ Dallas	L 102–107	Wilson (34)	Wilson (7)	McBride (12)	College Park Center; 6,209	14–19
34	August 19	Atlanta	L 78–93	Wilson (21)	Hamby (8)	Plum (8)	Mandalay Bay Events Center; 5,737	14–20

2018 season schedule

== Standings ==
#	Western Conference	W	L	PCT	GB	Home	Road	Conf.
1	Seattle Storm (1)	26	8	.765	–	13–4	13–4	11–5
2	Phoenix Mercury (5)	20	14	.588	6	9–8	11–6	8–8
3	Los Angeles Sparks (6)	19	15	.559	7	11–6	8–9	9–7
4	Minnesota Lynx (7)	18	16	.529	8	9–8	9–8	9–7
5	Dallas Wings (8)	15	19	.441	11	10–7	5–12	7–9
6	e –Las Vegas Aces	14	20	.412	12	8–9	6–11	4–12

Notes

(#) – Conference Standing, Playoff Seeds shown to the right of team name
x – Qualified for playoffs
e – Eliminated from playoffs

== Statistics ==
Legend
GP	Games played	GS	Games started	MPG	Minutes per game	RPG	Rebounds per game
APG	Assists per game	SPG	Steals per game	BPG	Blocks per game	PPG	Points per game
FG%	Field-goal percentage	3P%	3-point field-goal percentage	FT%	Free-throw percentage	TO	Turnovers per game
PF	Fouls per game		Team leader		League leader

=== Regular season ===
Player	GP	GS	MPG	FG%	3P%	FT%	RPG	APG	SPG	BPG	PPG
A'ja Wilson	33	33	30.6	46.2	0.0	77.4	8.0	2.2	0.8	1.7	20.7
Kayla McBride	31	31	32.3	44.9	39.3	91.7	3.9	3.5	1.1	0.1	18.2
Tamera Young	33	25	26.7	40.8	30.8	70.7	5.1	2.8	1.0	0.2	9.9
Kelsey Plum	31	27	25.5	46.7	43.9	87.5	2.4	4.0	0.8	0.2	9.5
Dearica Hamby	33	0	14.4	52.6	28.9	74.2	3.6	1.2	0.7	0.3	7.4
Moriah Jefferson	16	0	15.7	37.9	20.0	81.0	1.3	2.1	0.6	0.0	5.4
Nia Coffey	28	10	13.8	38.0	40.0	61.8	2.4	0.6	0.3	0.2	5.3
Carolyn Swords	26	12	14.5	55.7	0.0	87.5	4.7	0.9	0.2	0.7	3.9
Lindsay Allen	24	6	14.9	38.4	6.3	70.8	1.3	2.9	0.6	0.0	3.1
Kelsey Bone	32	10	10.8	50.0	0.0	50.0	2.2	1.2	0.1	0.1	2.8
Ji-Su Park	32	11	13.0	38.8	0.0	61.9	3.3	0.9	0.3	0.6	2.8
Jaime Nared	31	0	9.1	30.0	22.6	85.7	1.5	0.5	0.4	0.1	2.5

== Awards and honors ==
Recipient	Award	Date awarded	Ref.
A'ja Wilson	WNBA Rookie of the Month - June	July 2, 2018	
A'ja Wilson	WNBA Western Conference Player of the Week	July 9, 2018	
Kayla McBride	WNBA All-Star Selection	July 17, 2018	
A'ja Wilson	WNBA All-Star Selection	July 17, 2018	
A'ja Wilson	WNBA Rookie of the Month - July	August 1, 2018	
A'ja Wilson	WNBA Rookie of the Month - August	August 20, 2018	
A'ja Wilson	WNBA Rookie of the Year Award	September 9, 2018	
