= 2018 Dallas Wings season =

- Head coach: Fred Williams (fired); Taj McWilliams-Franklin (interim)
- Arena: College Park Center

Results
- Record: 15–19 (.441)
- Place: 5th (Western)
- Playoff finish: 8th seed, Lost in First Round to Phoenix 83–101

Media
- Television: Fox Sports Southwest

The 2018 WNBA season will be the 21st season for the Dallas Wings franchise of the WNBA. This will be the franchise's 3rd season in Dallas. The season tips off on May 18.

Dallas had an up and down start to the season, posting a 2–3 record in May followed by a 5–4 record in June. However all but one of these seven losses came to eventual playoff teams. The team posted an 8–5 record in July, including winning 7 of 8 games in the middle of the month. The three straight losses at the end of the month were the beginning of a nine-game losing streak.

In the midst of that losing streak, on August 12, 2018, the Wings fired their head coach Fred Williams. The team had a 14–17 record and was in the 8th and final playoff spot at the time of firing. Assistant Coach Taj McWilliams-Franklin was named the interim head coach for the remainder of the season.

McWilliams-Franklin posted a 1–2 record in her three games in charge. This saw the Wings finish 1–7 in August. However, the one win was an important one. The win was against the Las Vegas Aces, the Wing's playoff rivals. The Wings secured the 8th seed in the 2018 WNBA Playoffs by one game over the Aces. The team lost to the 5th seeded Phoenix Mercury 83–101 in the first round of the playoffs to end their season.

== Transactions ==
=== WNBA draft ===
Round	Pick	Player	Nationality	School/Team/Country
1	6	Azurá Stevens	United States	Connecticut
2	18	Loryn Goodwin	United States	Oklahoma State
3	30	Natalie Butler	United States	George Mason

=== Trades and roster changes ===
Date	Details
February 1, 2018	Re-signed F Kayla Thornton
February 2, 2018	Re-signed F Theresa Plaisance
February 5, 2018	Signed C Liz Cambage
February 28, 2018	Re-signed F Karima Christmas–Kelly
June 3, 2018	Signed C Cayla George
July 23, 2018	Traded F Aerial Powers to Washington Mystics in exchange for G Tayler Hill and 2019 WNBA draft second round pick and the rights to swap first round picks.
August 19, 2018	Signed Maggie Lucas.

== Roster ==
2018 Dallas Wings roster
Players
Coaches

Pos.	No.	Nat.	Name	Height	Weight	DOB	From	Yrs
C	8	(Australia)	Cambage, Liz	6' 8" (2.03m)	216 lb (98kg)	1991-08-18	Australia	2
F	13	(United States)	Christmas-Kelly, Karima (injured)	6' 0" (1.83m)	180 lb (82kg)	1989-09-11	Duke	7
G	3	(United States)	Davis, Kaela	6' 2" (1.88m)	170 lb (77kg)	1995-03-15	South Carolina	1
G	4	(United States)	Diggins-Smith, Skylar	5' 9" (1.75m)	145 lb (66kg)	1990-08-02	Notre Dame	5
C	22	(Australia)	George, Cayla	6' 4" (1.93m)	192 lb (87kg)	1989-05-01	Australia	2
G	15	(United States)	Gray, Allisha	6' 0" (1.83m)	167 lb (76kg)	1992-10-20	South Carolina	1
G	2	(United States)	Hill, Tayler	5' 9" (1.75m)	145 lb (66kg)	1990-10-23	Ohio State	5
F	25	(United States)	Johnson, Glory	6' 3" (1.91m)	170 lb (77kg)	1990-07-27	Tennessee	5
G	33	(United States)	Lucas, Maggie	5' 10" (1.78m)	158 lb (72kg)	1991-11-29	Penn State	3
F	55	(United States)	Plaisance, Theresa	6' 5" (1.96m)	200 lb (91kg)	1992-05-18	LSU	4
G	10	(Spain)	Romero, Leticia	5' 8" (1.73m)	143 lb (65kg)	1995-05-28	Spain	R
F/C	30	(United States)	Stevens, Azurá	6' 6" (1.98m)	180 lb (82kg)	1996-02-01	Connecticut	R
F	6	(United States)	Thornton, Kayla	6' 1" (1.85m)	190 lb (86kg)	1992-10-20	UTEP	2

Head coach
(United States) Taj McWilliams-Franklin (St. Edward's)
Assistant coaches
(Australia) Erin Phillips (Australia)
Athletic trainer
(United States) Allison Russell (Tulsa)
Strength and conditioning coach
(England) Danny Wardell (Huddersfield)

Legend

- (C) Team captain
- (DP) Unsigned draft pick
- (FA) Free agent
- (S) Suspended
- Injured

== Game log ==
=== Pre-season ===
2018 pre-season game log
May: 2–1 (Home: 1–0; Road: 1–1)

Game	Date	Team	Score	High points	High rebounds	High assists	Location Attendance	Record
1	May 7	vs. New York	W 76–69	Stevens (19)	Stevens (9)	Chong (3)	Mohegan Sun Arena; N/A	1–0
2	May 8	@ Connecticut	L 58–79	Tied (12)	Cambage (9)	Hamblin (2)	Mohegan Sun Arena; 3,695	1–1
3	May 13	Las Vegas	W 68–55	Stevens (12)	4 Tied (6)	Chong (4)	College Park Center; N/A	2–1

2018 pre-season schedule

=== Regular season ===
2018 game log
Total: 15–19 (Home: 10–7; Road: 5–12)
May: 2–3 (Home: 1–0; Road: 1–3)

Game	Date	Team	Score	High points	High rebounds	High assists	Location Attendance	Record
1	May 18	@ Phoenix	L 78–86	Tied (18)	Cambage (9)	Diggins–Smith (9)	Talking Stick Resort Arena; 11,210	0–1
2	May 20	Atlanta	W 101–78	Diggins–Smith (25)	Christmas–Kelly (10)	Davis (5)	College Park Center; 5,907	1–1
3	May 23	@ Minnesota	L 68–76	Cambage (14)	Cambage (12)	Diggins–Smith (7)	Target Center; 7,834	1–2
4	May 26	@ Atlanta	W 87–80	Diggins–Smith (24)	Cambage (14)	Tied (4)	McCamish Pavilion; 4,749	2–2
5	May 29	@ New York	L 89–94	Cambage (28)	Cambage (16)	Diggins–Smith (7)	Westchester County Center; 1,516	2–3

June : 5–4 (Home: 3–2; Road: 2–2)

Game	Date	Team	Score	High points	High rebounds	High assists	Location Attendance	Record
6	June 2	Seattle	W 94–90	Diggins–Smith (27)	Tied (7)	Diggins–Smith (7)	College Park Center; 5,191	3–3
7	June 8	@ Indiana	W 89–83	Diggins–Smith (35)	Diggins–Smith (12)	Diggins–Smith (6)	Bankers Life Fieldhouse; 5,675	4–3
8	June 12	Phoenix	L 72–75	Diggins–Smith (16)	Thornton (8)	Diggins–Smith (4)	College Park Center; 4,026	4–4
9	June 15	Las Vegas	W 77–67	Cambage (28)	Cambage (18)	Diggins–Smith (6)	College Park Center; 4,549	5–4
10	June 19	@ Minnesota	L 83–91	Diggins–Smith (17)	Cambage (9)	Diggins–Smith (7)	Target Center; 8,023	5–5
11	June 22	Los Angeles	W 101–72	Cambage (20)	Powers (8)	Diggins–Smith (11)	College Park Center; 5,672	6–5
12	June 24	Seattle	L 76–97	Cambage (23)	Cambage (9)	Diggins–Smith (7)	College Park Center; 4,084	6–6
13	June 26	@ Los Angeles	L 83–87	Cambage (25)	Cambage (14)	Diggins–Smith (5)	Staples Center; 10,002	6–7
14	June 27	@ Las Vegas	W 97–91	Diggins–Smith (29)	Cambage (11)	Diggins–Smith (8)	Mandalay Bay Events Center; 5,246	7–7

July : 8–5 (Home: 6–3; Road: 2–2)

Game	Date	Team	Score	High points	High rebounds	High assists	Location Attendance	Record
15	July 1	Minnesota	L 72–76	Diggins–Smith (16)	Johnson (8)	Diggins–Smith (7)	College Park Center; 4,448	7–8
16	July 3	Chicago	W 108–85	Cambage (37)	Cambage (10)	Tied (5)	College Park Center; 4,012	8–8
17	July 5	Indiana	W 90–63	Stevens (26)	Johnson (11)	Diggins–Smith (7)	College Park Center; 4,043	9–8
18	July 8	@ New York	W 97–87	Diggins–Smith (32)	Cambage (12)	Gray (6)	Westchester County Center; 1,719	10–8
19	July 10	Phoenix	W 101–72	Diggins–Smith (20)	Johnson (9)	Tied (4)	College Park Center; 4,034	11–8
20	July 12	@ Los Angeles	W 92–77	Diggins–Smith (22)	Johnson (7)	Diggins–Smith (11)	Staples Center; 13,502	12–8
21	July 14	@ Seattle	L 84–91	Cambage (23)	Stevens (9)	Diggins–Smith (7)	KeyArena; 9,686	12–9
22	July 17	New York	W 104–87	Cambage (53)	Cambage (10)	Diggins–Smith (7)	College Park Center; 6,459	13–9
23	July 19	Washington	W 90–81	Cambage (35)	Cambage (17)	Diggins–Smith (7)	College Park Center; 4,411	14–9
24	July 20	@ Chicago	L 99–114	Cambage (23)	Stevens (9)	Tied (5)	Wintrust Arena; 4,962	14–10
25	July 22	Connecticut	L 75–92	Cambage (25)	Cambage (10)	Tied (5)	College Park Center; 4,935	14–11
26	July 31	Chicago	L 91–92	Cambage (33)	Johnson (14)	Gray (10)	College Park Center; 3,696	14–12

August : 1–7 (Home: 1–2; Road: 0–5)

Game	Date	Team	Score	High points	High rebounds	High assists	Location Attendance	Record
27	August 2	@ Indiana	L 78–84	Cambage (37)	Tied (9)	4 Tied (3)	Bankers Life Fieldhouse; 5,981	14–13
28	August 5	Washington	L 74–76	Tied (16)	Cambage (14)	Tied (4)	College Park Center; 5,623	14–14
29	August 8	Connecticut	L 92–101	Cambage (29)	Tied (9)	Cambage (4)	College Park Center; 3,483	14–15
30	August 11	@ Atlanta	L 82–92	Diggins–Smith (26)	Stevens (6)	Diggins–Smith (10)	McCamish Pavilion; 4,937	14–16
31	August 12	@ Washington	L 80–93	Diggins–Smith (17)	Gray (12)	Diggins–Smith (6)	Capital One Arena; 6,362	14–17
32	August 14	@ Connecticut	L 76–96	Gray (18)	Cambage (13)	Diggins–Smith (8)	Mohegan Sun Arena; 6,365	14–18
33	August 17	Las Vegas	W 107–102	Cambage (43)	Cambage (13)	Diggins–Smith (8)	College Park Center; 6,209	15–18
34	August 19	@ Seattle	L 68–84	Johnson (16)	Johnson (7)	Diggins–Smith (4)	KeyArena; 12,574	15–19

2018 season schedule

=== Playoffs ===
2018 playoff game log
WNBA First Round: 0–1 (Home: 0–0; Road: 0–1)

Game	Date	Team	Score	High points	High rebounds	High assists	Location Attendance	Series
1	August 21	@ Phoenix	L 83–101	Diggins–Smith (23)	Cambage (12)	Diggins–Smith (7)	Wells Fargo Arena; 4,976	0–1

2018 playoff schedule

== Standings ==
#	Western Conference	W	L	PCT	GB	Home	Road	Conf.
1	Seattle Storm (1)	26	8	.765	–	13–4	13–4	11–5
2	Phoenix Mercury (5)	20	14	.588	6	9–8	11–6	8–8
3	Los Angeles Sparks (6)	19	15	.559	7	11–6	8–9	9–7
4	Minnesota Lynx (7)	18	16	.529	8	9–8	9–8	9–7
5	Dallas Wings (8)	15	19	.441	11	10–7	5–12	7–9
6	e –Las Vegas Aces	14	20	.412	12	8–9	6–11	4–12

== Playoffs ==
**First round** Single elimination (Aug. 21)
5	**Phoenix Mercury**	**101**
8	Dallas Wings	83
6	**Los Angeles Sparks**	**75**
7	Minnesota Lynx	68

**Second round** Single elimination (Aug. 23)
4	Connecticut Sun	86
5	**Phoenix Mercury**	**96**
3	**Washington Mystics**	**96**
6	Los Angeles Sparks	64

**Semifinals**; Best-of-5 (Aug. 26 – Sept. 4)
1	**Seattle Storm**	**3**
5	Phoenix Mercury	2
2	Atlanta Dream	2
3	**Washington Mystics**	**3**

**WNBA Finals**; Best-of-5 (Sept. 7 – Sept. 12)
1	**Seattle Storm**	**3**
3	Washington Mystics	0

Note: Teams re-seeded after second round and semi-finals.

- **Bold** – Game or series winner
- Italic – Team with home-court advantage

== Statistics ==
Legend
GP	Games played	GS	Games started	MPG	Minutes per game	RPG	Rebounds per game
APG	Assists per game	SPG	Steals per game	BPG	Blocks per game	PPG	Points per game
FG%	Field-goal percentage	3P%	3-point field-goal percentage	FT%	Free-throw percentage	TO	Turnovers per game
PF	Fouls per game		Team leader		League leader

=== Regular season ===
Player	GP	GS	MPG	FG%	3P%	FT%	RPG	APG	SPG	BPG	PPG
Liz Cambage	32	32	29.5	58.9	32.4	73.8	9.7	2.3	0.5	1.7	23.0
Skylar Diggins-Smith	32	32	34.1	40.3	29.7	83.9	3.3	6.2	1.4	0.5	17.9
Karima Christmas-Kelly	6	6	27.8	44.8	44.4	81.3	5.5	1.5	0.3	0.3	9.3
Kayla Thornton	34	32	28.6	44.7	35.5	86.0	4.0	1.8	1.0	0.4	9.2
Allisha Gray	34	34	26.7	40.3	27.0	86.3	3.4	2.4	1.3	0.2	9.2
Azurá Stevens	34	9	20.6	43.0	31.8	78.8	4.6	1.3	0.9	1.1	8.9
Glory Johnson	29	17	22.5	41.7	31.5	78.0	6.0	1.3	1.0	0.5	8.0
Theresa Plaisance	7	0	11.6	38.9	47.4	0.0	3.7	0.7	0.3	0.3	5.3
Tayler Hill	7	1	16.9	28.9	29.2	100.0	3.7	0.7	0.3	0.3	5.0
Kaela Davis	27	6	16.8	34.7	24.4	64.1	2.0	1.4	0.3	0.0	5.0
Cayla George	23	1	10.7	43.6	30.8	50.0	2.8	0.7	0.1	0.2	3.6
Leticia Romero	21	0	7.0	31.3	20.0	86.7	0.8	1.1	0.0	0.0	1.1
Maggie Lucas	1	0	20.0	0.0	0.0	0.0	0.0	0.0	2.0	0.0	0.0

== Awards and honors ==
Recipient	Award	Date awarded	Ref.
Liz Cambage	WNBA Western Conference Player of the Week	June 4, 2018	
Liz Cambage	WNBA All-Star Selection	July 17, 2018	
Skylar Diggins-Smith	WNBA All-Star Selection	July 17, 2018	
Liz Cambage	WNBA Western Conference Player of the Week	July 23, 2018	
Liz Cambage	WNBA Peak Performer – Points	August 19, 2018	
