= 2018 Chicago Sky season =

- Head coach: Amber Stocks
- Arena: Wintrust Arena

Results
- Record: 13–21 (.382)
- Place: 4th (Eastern)
- Playoff finish: Did not qualify

Media
- Television: WMEU-CD (The U Too); ESPN; ESPN2; NBA TV

The 2018 Chicago Sky season was the franchise's 13th season in the Women's National Basketball Association (WNBA). The regular season tipped off on May 6, and concludes on August 19.

The Sky started the season off with wins over Indiana and New York and finished 2–2 in May. However, the team couldn't keep the momentum and lost 7 of their next 8 games. The Sky ended June on a 3 game win streak with a 4–7 overall record. The winning streak didn't last long, as the team went 4–8 in July. All 4 July wins came against eventual playoff teams, but the Sky also had 4 losses against teams that would not end up in the playoffs. A 3–4 August meant the Sky missed the playoffs for the second straight year. They were 2 wins behind the 8th seed Dallas Wings.

On August 31, 2018, the Sky relieved Amber Stocks as head coach and general manager.

== Transactions ==
=== WNBA draft ===
The Sky made the following selections in the 2018 WNBA draft:

| Round | Pick | Player | Nationality | School/Team/Country |
|---|---|---|---|---|
| 1 | 3 | Diamond DeShields | United States | Tennessee |
| 1 | 4 | Gabby Williams | United States | UConn |
| 3 | 28 | Amarah Coleman | United States | DePaul |

=== Trades/Roster Changes ===
| Date | Trade |
|---|---|
| February 2, 2018 | Re-Signed G Allie Quigley |
| February 5, 2018 | Re-Signed C Alaina Coates and F Jordan Hooper |
| February 20, 2018 | Re-Signed G Jamierra Faulkner and F/C Adut Bulgak |
| February 23, 2018 | Signed F/G Alex Montgomery |

== Roster ==
2018 Chicago Sky roster
Players
Coaches

| Pos. | No. | Nat. | Name | Height | Weight | DOB | From | Yrs |
|---|---|---|---|---|---|---|---|---|
| C | 41 | (United States) | Coates, Alaina | 6' 4" (1.93m) | 155 lb (70kg) | April 7, 1995 | South Carolina | R |
| G/F | 2 | (United States) | Copper, Kahleah | 6' 1" (1.85m) | 155 lb (70kg) | August 28, 1994 | Rutgers | 2 |
| G | 0 | (United States) | DeShields, Diamond | 6' 1" (1.85m) | | March 5, 1995 | Tennessee | R |
| C | 31 | (United States) | Dolson, Stefanie | 6' 5" (1.96m) | 214 lb (97kg) | January 8, 1992 | Connecticut | 4 |
| G | 21 | (United States) | Faulkner, Jamierra (injured) | 5' 6" (1.68m) | 141 lb (64kg) | March 9, 1992 | Southern Miss | 3 |
| G | 23 | (United States) | Harper, Linnae | 5' 8" (1.73m) | 150 lb (68kg) | January 31, 1995 | Ohio State | R |
| G/F | 6 | (United States) | Montgomery, Alex | 6' 1" (1.85m) | 185 lb (84kg) | November 12, 1988 | Georgia Tech | 7 |
| C | 45 | (Spain) | Ndour, Astou | 6' 5" (1.96m) | | August 22, 1994 | Spain | 2 |
| F | 32 | (United States) | Parker, Cheyenne | 6' 4" (1.93m) | 190 lb (86kg) | August 22, 1992 | Middle Tennessee | 3 |
| G | 14 | (United States) | Quigley, Allie | 5' 10" (1.78m) | 140 lb (64kg) | June 20, 1986 | DePaul | 9 |
| G | 22 | (United States) | Vandersloot, Courtney | 5' 8" (1.73m) | 145 lb (66kg) | February 8, 1989 | Gonzaga | 7 |
| F | 15 | (United States) | Williams, Gabby | 5' 11" (1.8m) | 170 lb (77kg) | September 9, 1996 | Connecticut | R |

Head coach
(United States) Amber Stocks (Cincinnati)
Assistant coaches
(United States) Carla Morrow (Tulsa)
(United States) Awvee Storey (Arizona State)
Player development
(United States) Emre Vatansever
Athletic trainer
Jody Jenike
Strength and conditioning coach
(United States) Ann Crosby (Western Michigan)

Legend

- (C) Team captain
- (DP) Unsigned draft pick
- (FA) Free agent
- (S) Suspended
- Injured

== Game log ==
=== Preseason ===
2018 pre-season game log
May: 0–3 (Home: 0–1; Road: 0–2)

| Game | Date | Team | Score | High points | High rebounds | High assists | Location Attendance | Record |
|---|---|---|---|---|---|---|---|---|
| 1 | May 6; 3:00 PM (Note: All times are specified as Central Time.) | Atlanta | L 61–78 | Parker (13) | Parker (8) | Alston (7) | Wintrust Arena | 0–1 |
| 2 | May 7; 11:30 AM | @ Indiana | L 65-79 | Cooper/Parker (10) | Bulgak (8) | Montgomery/Hopkins/Alston (2) | Bankers Life Fieldhouse | 0–2 |
| 3 | May 12 | @ Minnesota | L 58-87 | Dolson (11) | Dolson/Parker (5) | Cooper/Quigley (4) | Target Center; 5,024 | 0–3 |

2018 pre-season schedule

=== Regular season ===
2018 game log
Total: 13–21 (Home: 7–10; Road: 6–11)
May: 2–2 (Home: 1–1; Road: 1–1)

| Game | Date | Team | Score | High points | High rebounds | High assists | Location Attendance | Record |
|---|---|---|---|---|---|---|---|---|
| 1 | May 19 | @ Indiana | W 82–64 | Quigley (19) | Tied (8) | Tied (5) | Bankers Life Fieldhouse; 6,565 | 1–0 |
| 2 | May 20 | New York | W 80–76 | Quigley (22) | Parker (8) | Tied (5) | Wintrust Arena; 7,922 | 2–0 |
| 3 | May 23 | Atlanta | L 63–81 | Quigley (13) | Coates (8) | 4 Tied (3) | Wintrust Arena; 6,147 | 2–1 |
| 4 | May 25 | @ Seattle | L 91–95 OT | Quigley (23) | Parker (8) | Faulkner (9) | KeyArena; 5,866 | 2–2 |

June : 4–7 (Home: 3–3; Road: 1–4)

| Game | Date | Team | Score | High points | High rebounds | High assists | Location Attendance | Record |
|---|---|---|---|---|---|---|---|---|
| 5 | June 1 | Connecticut | L 72–110 | De Shields (15) | Tied (5) | Vandersloot (7) | Wintrust Arena; 4,131 | 2–3 |
| 6 | June 3 | Las Vegas | W 95–90 | De Shields (25) | Parker (13) | Vandersloot (9) | Wintrust Arena; 5,052 | 3–3 |
| 7 | June 8 | @ Phoenix | L 79–96 | Williams (26) | De Shields (7) | Vandersloot (6) | Talking Stick Resort Arena; 8,834 | 3–4 |
| 8 | June 10 | @ Los Angeles | L 59–77 | Parker (17) | Parker (12) | Faulkner (6) | Staples Center; 8,239 | 3–5 |
| 9 | June 12 | @ Seattle | L 85–96 | De Shields (22) | Parker (10) | Vandersloot (5) | KeyArena; 4,353 | 3–6 |
| 10 | June 17 | Los Angeles | L 72–81 | Faulkner (19) | Parker (10) | Vandersloot (7) | Wintrust Arena; 5,584 | 3–7 |
| 11 | June 19 | @ Washington | L 60–88 | Parker (18) | Parker (9) | Vandersloot (6) | Capital One Arena; 4,206 | 3–8 |
| 12 | June 22 | Washington | L 77–93 | Quigley (21) | Williams (8) | Vandersloot (7) | Wintrust Arena; 5,831 | 3–9 |
| 13 | June 24 | Phoenix | W 97–88 | Quigley (20) | Williams (8) | Vandersloot (12) | Wintrust Arena; 4,741 | 4–9 |
| 14 | June 27 | Atlanta | W 93-80 | DeShields (23) | DeShields (11) | Vandersloot (11) | Wintrust Arena; 8,521 | 5-9 |
| 15 | June 29 | @ New York | W 103–99 | DeShields (22) | Dolson (6) | Vandersloot (11) | Westchester County Center; 1,837 | 6–9 |

July : 4–8 (Home: 2–4; Road: 2–4)

| Game | Date | Team | Score | High points | High rebounds | High assists | Location Attendance | Record |
|---|---|---|---|---|---|---|---|---|
| 16 | July 1 | New York | L 94–97 OT | Quigley (28) | Dolson (10) | Faulkner (8) | Wintrust Arena; 5,382 | 6–10 |
| 17 | July 3 | @ Dallas | L 85–108 | DeShields (20) | Dolson (5) | Vandersloot (7) | College Park Center; 4,012 | 6–11 |
| 18 | July 5 | @ Las Vegas | L 80–84 | Quigley (13) | Parker (9) | Vandersloot (9) | Mandalay Bay Events Center; 4,699 | 6–12 |
| 19 | July 7 | Minnesota | W 77–63 | Quigley (15) | Parker (8) | Vandersloot (9) | Wintrust Arena; 6,139 | 7–12 |
| 20 | July 10 | Las Vegas | L 74–98 | DeShields (15) | Parker (8) | Vandersloot (8) | Wintrust Arena; 7,696 | 7–13 |
| 21 | July 13 | @ Washington | L 72–88 | Quigley (17) | DeShields (6) | Vandersloot (9) | Capital One Arena; 5,858 | 7–14 |
| 22 | July 15 | @ New York | L 84–107 | Vandersloot (15) | DeShields (4) | Vandersloot (8) | Madison Square Garden; 2,073 | 7–15 |
| 23 | July 18 | Seattle | L 83–101 | Quigley (18) | Coates (6) | Tied (6) | Wintrust Arena; 10,024 | 7–16 |
| 24 | July 20 | Dallas | W 114–99 | Cooper (23) | Vandersloot (10) | Vandersloot (15) | Wintrust Arena; 4,962 | 8–16 |
| 25 | July 22 | Los Angeles | L 76-93 | Dolson (20) | 3 Tied (6) | Vandersloot (10) | Wintrust Arena; 6,477 | 8–17 |
| 26 | July 25 | @ Phoenix | W 101–87 | DeShields (25) | Parker (8) | Vandersloot (11) | Talking Stick Resort Arena; 10,338 | 9–17 |
| 27 | July 31 | @ Dallas | W 92–91 | Quigley (22) | Tied (6) | Vandersloot (14) | College Park Center; 3,696 | 10–17 |

August : 3–4 (Home: 2–2; Road: 1–2)

| Game | Date | Team | Score | High points | High rebounds | High assists | Location Attendance | Record |
|---|---|---|---|---|---|---|---|---|
| 28 | August 3 | @ Atlanta | L 74–89 | Vandersloot (24) | Coates (6) | Vandersloot (7) | McCamish Pavilion; 5,120 | 10–18 |
| 29 | August 7 | Minnesota | L 64–85 | Quigley (22) | Williams (8) | Vandersloot (7) | Wintrust Arena; 6,388 | 10–19 |
| 30 | August 10 | Connecticut | W 97–86 | Vandersloot (20) | Coates (10) | Vandersloot (15) | Wintrust Arena; 5,976 | 11–19 |
| 31 | August 12 | @ Connecticut | L 75–82 | Dolson (20) | Dolson (8) | Vandersloot (7) | Mohegan Sun Arena; 7,687 | 11–20 |
| 32 | August 14 | @ Minnesota | W 91–88 | DeShields (28) | Parker (6) | Vandersloot (10) | Target Center; 9,730 | 12–20 |
| 33 | August 18 | @ Indiana | W 115–106 2OT | Tied (24) | Coates (10) | Vandersloot (10) | Bankers Life Fieldhouse; 8,442 | 13–20 |
| 34 | August 19 | Indiana | L 92–97 | DeShields (27) | Dolson (6) | Vandersloot (7) | Wintrust Arena; 7,118 | 13–21 |

2018 season schedule

=== Standings ===
| # | Eastern Conference | W | L | PCT | GB | Home | Road | Conf. |
|---|---|---|---|---|---|---|---|---|
| 1 | Atlanta Dream (2) | 23 | 11 | .676 | – | 13–4 | 10–7 | 12–4 |
| 2 | Washington Mystics (3) | 22 | 12 | .647 | 1 | 12–5 | 10–7 | 12–4 |
| 3 | Connecticut Sun (4) | 21 | 13 | .618 | 2 | 13–4 | 8–9 | 9–7 |
| 4 | e – Chicago Sky | 13 | 21 | .382 | 10 | 7–10 | 6–11 | 6–10 |
| 5 | e – New York Liberty | 7 | 27 | .206 | 16 | 4–13 | 3–14 | 6–10 |
| 6 | e – Indiana Fever | 6 | 28 | .176 | 17 | 2–15 | 4–13 | 3–13 |

Notes

(#) – Conference Standing, Playoff Seeds shown to the right of team name
x – Clinched Playoff Berth
e – Eliminated from playoffs

== Statistics ==
Legend
| GP | Games played | GS | Games started | MPG | Minutes per game | RPG | Rebounds per game |
| APG | Assists per game | SPG | Steals per game | BPG | Blocks per game | PPG | Points per game |
| FG% | Field-goal percentage | 3P% | 3-point field-goal percentage | FT% | Free-throw percentage | TO | Turnovers per game |
| PF | Fouls per game | | Team leader | | League leader |

=== Regular season ===
| Player | GP | GS | MPG | FG% | 3P% | FT% | RPG | APG | SPG | BPG | PPG |
|---|---|---|---|---|---|---|---|---|---|---|---|
| Allie Quigley | 32 | 32 | 29.7 | 46.6 | 42.0 | 85.7 | 2.4 | 2.5 | 0.7 | 0.3 | 15.4 |
| Diamond DeShields | 34 | 33 | 28.4 | 42.5 | 32.8 | 83.6 | 4.9 | 2.2 | 1.1 | 0.3 | 14.4 |
| Courtney Vandersloot | 30 | 30 | 31.8 | 48.9 | 39.8 | 82.6 | 3.7 | 8.6 | 1.3 | 0.6 | 12.5 |
| Cheyenne Parker | 34 | 5 | 19.7 | 53.1 | 31.6 | 71.3 | 5.8 | 0.7 | 0.6 | 1.1 | 10.0 |
| Stefanie Dolson | 27 | 25 | 27.6 | 46.7 | 34.6 | 93.8 | 4.6 | 3.0 | 0.6 | 0.9 | 9.7 |
| Jamierra Faulkner | 17 | 0 | 21.2 | 34.3 | 30.2 | 75.0 | 1.4 | 3.9 | 0.5 | 0.1 | 7.6 |
| Gabby Williams | 34 | 30 | 23.0 | 43.2 | 26.9 | 78.3 | 4.3 | 1.6 | 1.6 | 0.2 | 7.3 |
| Kahleah Copper | 33 | 2 | 15.9 | 39.7 | 37.5 | 87.5 | 2.2 | 0.6 | 0.3 | 0.2 | 7.1 |
| Astou Ndour | 22 | 9 | 11.6 | 47.4 | 31.8 | 76.9 | 2.5 | 0.3 | 0.2 | 0.5 | 4.6 |
| Alaina Coates | 32 | 0 | 11.4 | 56.8 | 0.0 | 62.5 | 3.2 | 0.4 | 0.2 | 0.2 | 3.4 |
| Linnae Harper | 24 | 0 | 6.4 | 40.4 | 30.8 | 60.0 | 0.8 | 1.0 | 0.2 | 0.0 | 2.0 |
| Alex Montgomery | 19 | 0 | 6.4 | 26.3 | 33.3 | 100.0 | 0.9 | 0.5 | 0.1 | 0.1 | 0.8 |

== Awards and honors ==
| Recipient | Award | Date awarded | Ref. |
|---|---|---|---|
| Allie Quigley | WNBA All-Star Selection | July 17, 2018 | |
| Allie Quigley | WNBA All-Star Three Point Contest – Winner | July 28, 2018 | |
| Courtney Vandersloot | WNBA Peak Performer – Assists | August 19, 2018 | |
