= 2018 Los Angeles Sparks season =

- Head coach: Brian Agler
- Arena: Staples Center

Results
- Record: 19–15 (.559)
- Place: 3rd (Western)
- Playoff finish: 6th seed, Lost in Second Round to Washington 64–96

Media
- Television: Spectrum SportsNet; ESPN2, NBATV

The 2018 Los Angeles Sparks season was the 22nd season for the Los Angeles Sparks of the Women's National Basketball Association. The season tipped off on May 20.

The Sparks started out strong with a 4–1 record in May. They won their season opener in a re-match of the 2017 WNBA Finals against the Minnesota Lynx. They continued their strong run into June where the team posted an 8–4 record. The Sparks won 6 of 7 to start the month. Two of their June losses game to the eventual WNBA Champion Seattle Storm. However, things started to get shaky in July. The Sparks went 4–6. However, all but one loss came to eventual playoff teams. The other loss was to Indiana, who ended the season with the worst record. The Sparks finished with a 4–4 record in August, including 3–0 at home. However, the Sparks lost 4 of their last 5 (again all against playoff teams).

Their final record of 19–15 was good enough to secure the 6th seed in the 2018 WNBA Playoffs. They met the Lynx in the first round, in a re-match of the last three WNBA Finals. The Sparks prevailed 75–68 at the Staples Center. In the second round, they faced the Washington Mystics in Washington, but were defeated 64–96 to end their season.

== Transactions ==
=== WNBA draft ===
| Round | Pick | Player | Nationality | School/Team/Country |
|---|---|---|---|---|
| 1 | 11 | Maria Vadeeva | Russia | Dynamo Kursk (Russia) |
| 2 | 23 | Shakayla Thomas | United States | Florida State |
| 3 | 35 | Julia Reisingerová | Czech Republic | Femeni Sant Adrià (Spain) |

=== Trades/Roster Changes ===
| Date | Details |
|---|---|
| February 1, 2018 | Re-sign G Odyssey Sims |
| February 1, 2018 | Sign G Ana Dabovic and G Karlie Samuelson |
| February 6, 2018 | Re-sign G Alana Beard |
| February 14, 2018 | Sign G Cappie Pondexter |
| February 21, 2018 | Re-sign F Tiffany Jackson |

== Roster ==
2018 Los Angeles Sparks roster
Players
Coaches

| Pos. | No. | Nat. | Name | Height | Weight | DOB | From | Yrs |
|---|---|---|---|---|---|---|---|---|
| G/F | 0 | (United States) | Beard, Alana | 5' 11" (1.8m) | 160 lb (73kg) | 1982-05-14 | Duke | 12 |
| G/F | 17 | (United States) | Carson, Essence | 6' 0" (1.83m) | 163 lb (74kg) | 1986-07-28 | Rutgers | 10 |
| G | 12 | (United States) | Gray, Chelsea | 5' 11" (1.8m) | 170 lb (77kg) | 1992-10-08 | Duke | 3 |
| C | 42 | (United States) | Lavender, Jantel | 6' 4" (1.93m) | 185 lb (84kg) | 1988-11-12 | Ohio State | 7 |
| F | 30 | (United States) | Ogwumike, Nneka | 6' 2" (1.88m) | 174 lb (79kg) | 1990-07-02 | Stanford | 6 |
| F/C | 3 | (United States) | Parker, Candace | 6' 4" (1.93m) | 175 lb (79kg) | 1986-04-19 | Tennessee | 10 |
| G | 44 | (United States) | Samuelson, Karlie | 6' 0" (1.83m) | | 1995-05-10 | Stanford | R |
| G | 1 | (United States) | Sims, Odyssey | 5' 8" (1.73m) | 160 lb (73kg) | 1992-07-13 | Baylor | 4 |
| C | 10 | (Russia) | Vadeeva, Maria | 6' 4" (1.93m) | 190 lb (86kg) | 1998-06-16 | Russia | R |
| G | 24 | (United States) | Wiese, Sydney | 6' 0" (1.83m) | | 1995-06-16 | Oregon State | 1 |
| G | 2 | (United States) | Williams, Riquna | 5' 7" (1.7m) | 165 lb (75kg) | 1990-05-28 | Miami (FL) | 5 |

Head coach
(United States) Brian Agler (Wittenberg)
Assistant coaches
(United States) Tonya Edwards (Tennessee)
(United States) Bobbie Kelsey (Stanford)
Athletic trainer
(United States) Courtney Watson (California)
Strength and conditioning coach
(United States) Kelly Dormandy (Springfield)

Legend

- (C) Team captain
- (DP) Unsigned draft pick
- (FA) Free agent
- (S) Suspended
- Injured

== Game log ==
=== Preseason ===
2018 pre-season game log
May: 1–2 (Home: 1–0; Road: 0–2)

| Game | Date | Team | Score | High points | High rebounds | High assists | Location Attendance | Record |
|---|---|---|---|---|---|---|---|---|
| 1 | May 7 | @ Connecticut | L 65–68 | Thomas (17) | Thomas (8) | Pondexter (3) | Mohegan Sun Arena | 0–1 |
| 2 | May 8 | vs. New York | L 75–81 | Pondexter (17) | Wiese (9) | Pondexter (5) | Mohegan Sun Arena; 1,106 | 0–2 |
| 3 | May 12 | China | W 82–61 | Gray (17) | Carson (5) | Gray (10) | Hutto-Patterson Gym; 1,650 | 1–2 |

2018 pre-season schedule

=== Regular season ===
2018 game log
Total: 19–15 (Home: 11–6; Road: 8–9)
May: 3–1 (Home: 1–0; Road: 2–1)

| Game | Date | Team | Score | High points | High rebounds | High assists | Location Attendance | Record |
|---|---|---|---|---|---|---|---|---|
| 1 | May 20 | @ Minnesota | W 77–76 | Sims (21) | Ogwumike (9) | Gray (8) | Target Center; 13,032 | 1–0 |
| 2 | May 22 | @ Indiana | W 87–70 | Ogwumike (25) | Ogwumike (10) | Gray (8) | Bankers Life Fieldhouse; 4,742 | 2–0 |
| 3 | May 24 | @ Connecticut | L 94–102 | Gray (21) | Tied (4) | Sims (7) | Mohegan Sun Arena; 5,571 | 2–1 |
| 4 | May 27 | Phoenix | W 80–72 | Gray (23) | Ogwumike (8) | Gray (8) | Staples Center; 11,201 | 3–1 |

June : 8–4 (Home: 6–1; Road: 2–3)

| Game | Date | Team | Score | High points | High rebounds | High assists | Location Attendance | Record |
|---|---|---|---|---|---|---|---|---|
| 5 | June 3 | Minnesota | W 77–69 | Parker (19) | Parker (10) | Gray (6) | Staples Center; 13,500 | 4–1 |
| 6 | June 7 | Seattle | L 63–88 | Ogwumike (19) | Ogwumike (6) | Sims (5) | Staples Center; 9,204 | 4–2 |
| 7 | June 10 | Chicago | W 77–59 | Parker (24) | Ogwumike (8) | Sims (5) | Staples Center; 8,239 | 5–2 |
| 8 | June 12 | Atlanta | W 72–64 | Parker (18) | Ogwumike (10) | Gray (7) | Staples Center; 9,215 | 6–2 |
| 9 | June 15 | @ Washington | W 97–86 | Parker (23) | Parker (7) | Parker (11) | Capital One Arena; 5,289 | 7–2 |
| 10 | June 17 | @ Chicago | W 81–72 | Gray (21) | Tied (11) | Gray (6) | Wintrust Arena; 5,584 | 8–2 |
| 11 | June 19 | Indiana | W 74–55 | Parker (15) | Ogwumike (7) | Gray (7) | Staples Center; 8,857 | 9–2 |
| 12 | June 22 | @ Dallas | L 72–101 | Ogwumike (17) | Parker (6) | Parker (6) | College Park Center; 5,672 | 9–3 |
| 13 | June 24 | New York | 80–54 | Williams (25) | Ogwumike (10) | Gray (11) | Staples Center; 9,203 | 10–3 |
| 14 | June 26 | Dallas | W 87–83 | Parker (29) | Vadeeva (6) | Parker (7) | Staples Center; 10,002 | 11–3 |
| 15 | June 28 | @ Seattle | L 72–81 | Parker (27) | Parker (11) | Parker (3) | KeyArena; 8,447 | 11–4 |
| 16 | June 29 | @ Las Vegas | L 78–94 | Gray (22) | Vadeeva (7) | Beard (6) | Mandalay Bay Events Center; 5,124 | 11–5 |

July : 4–6 (Home: 1–5; Road: 3–1)

| Game | Date | Team | Score | High points | High rebounds | High assists | Location Attendance | Record |
|---|---|---|---|---|---|---|---|---|
| 17 | July 1 | Las Vegas | W 87–71 | Lavender (17) | Ogwumike (7) | 3 Tied (6) | Staples Center; 12,003 | 12–5 |
| 18 | July 3 | Connecticut | L 72–73 | Ogwumike (20) | Parker (8) | Parker (4) | Staples Center; 6,280 | 12–6 |
| 19 | July 5 | @ Minnesota | L 72–83 | Parker (22) | Ogwumike (8) | Gray (8) | Target Center; 9,303 | 12–7 |
| 20 | July 7 | Washington | L 74–83 | Gray (23) | Ogwumike (13) | Ogwumike (5) | Staples Center; 10,163 | 12–8 |
| 21 | July 10 | @ Seattle | W 77–75 (OT) | Parker (21) | Tied (9) | Parker (10) | KeyArena; 9,686 | 13–8 |
| 22 | July 12 | Dallas | L 77–92 | Parker (21) | Parker (7) | Gray (5) | Staples Center; 13,502 | 13–9 |
| 23 | July 15 | @ Las Vegas | W 99–78 | Parker (34) | Parker (11) | Parker (9) | Mandalay Bay Events Center; 4,810 | 14–9 |
| 24 | July 20 | Indiana | L 76–78 | Parker (24) | Parker (12) | Parker (7) | Staples Center; 10,532 | 14–10 |
| 25 | July 22 | @ Chicago | W 93–76 | Parker (23) | Parker (12) | Gray (9) | Wintrust Arena; 6,477 | 15–10 |
| 26 | July 24 | Atlanta | L 71–81 | Gray (18) | Parker (9) | Parker (5) | Staples Center; 9,324 | 15–11 |

August : 4–4 (Home: 3–0; Road: 1–4)

| Game | Date | Team | Score | High points | High rebounds | High assists | Location Attendance | Record |
|---|---|---|---|---|---|---|---|---|
| 27 | August 2 | Minnesota | W 79–57 | Parker (23) | Parker (10) | Gray (9) | Staples Center; 9,542 | 16-11 |
| 28 | August 5 | Phoenix | W 78–75 | Gray (24) | Parker (14) | Parker (8) | Staples Center; 19,076 | 17-11 |
| 29 | August 8 | @ New York | W 82–81 | Gray (19) | Parker (8) | Parker (6) | Westchester County Center; 2,481 | 18-11 |
| 30 | August 9 | @ Atlanta | L 73–79 | Parker (20) | Parker (12) | Tied (4) | McCamish Pavilion; 4,235 | 18-12 |
| 31 | August 12 | @ Phoenix | L 78–86 | Parker (23) | Parker (8) | Sims (6) | Talking Stick Resort Arena; 10,618 | 18-13 |
| 32 | August 14 | New York | W 74–66 | Gray (26) | Parker (10) | Gray (5) | Staples Center; 11,067 | 19-13 |
| 33 | August 17 | @ Washington | L 67–69 | Williams (14) | Tied (8) | Parker (7) | Capital One Arena; 7,400 | 19-14 |
| 34 | August 19 | @ Connecticut | L 86–89 | Parker (20) | Parker (10) | Gray (7) | Mohegan Sun Arena; 8,040 | 19-15 |

2018 season schedule

=== Playoffs ===
2018 playoff game log
Total: 1–1 (Home: 1–0; Road: 0–1)
WNBA First Round: 1–0 (Home: 1–0; Road: 0–0)

| Game | Date | Team | Score | High points | High rebounds | High assists | Location Attendance | Series |
|---|---|---|---|---|---|---|---|---|
| 1 | August 21 | Minnesota | W 75–68 | Gray (26) | Parker (6) | Gray (6) | Staples Center; 8,598 | 1–0 |

WNBA Second Round: 0–1 (Home: 0–0; Road: 0–1)

| Game | Date | Team | Score | High points | High rebounds | High assists | Location Attendance | Series |
|---|---|---|---|---|---|---|---|---|
| 1 | August 23 | @ Washington | L 64–96 | Parker (16) | Parker (8) | 3 Tied (3) | Capital One Arena; 3,548 | 1–1 |

2018 playoff schedule

== Standings ==
| # | Western Conference | W | L | PCT | GB | Home | Road | Conf. |
|---|---|---|---|---|---|---|---|---|
| 1 | Seattle Storm (1) | 26 | 8 | .765 | – | 13–4 | 13–4 | 11–5 |
| 2 | Phoenix Mercury (5) | 20 | 14 | .588 | 6 | 9–8 | 11–6 | 8–8 |
| 3 | Los Angeles Sparks (6) | 19 | 15 | .559 | 7 | 11–6 | 8–9 | 9–7 |
| 4 | Minnesota Lynx (7) | 18 | 16 | .529 | 8 | 9–8 | 9–8 | 9–7 |
| 5 | Dallas Wings (8) | 15 | 19 | .441 | 11 | 10–7 | 5–12 | 7–9 |
| 6 | e –Las Vegas Aces | 14 | 20 | .412 | 12 | 8–9 | 6–11 | 4–12 |

== Playoffs ==
**First round** Single elimination (Aug. 21)
5 | **Phoenix Mercury** | **101**
8 | Dallas Wings | 83
6 | **Los Angeles Sparks** | **75**
7 | Minnesota Lynx | 68

**Second round** Single elimination (Aug. 23)
4 | Connecticut Sun | 86
5 | **Phoenix Mercury** | **96**
3 | **Washington Mystics** | **96**
6 | Los Angeles Sparks | 64

**Semifinals**; Best-of-5 (Aug. 26 – Sept. 4)
1 | **Seattle Storm** | **3**
5 | Phoenix Mercury | 2
2 | Atlanta Dream | 2
3 | **Washington Mystics** | **3**

**WNBA Finals**; Best-of-5 (Sept. 7 – Sept. 12)
1 | **Seattle Storm** | **3**
3 | Washington Mystics | 0

Note: Teams re-seeded after second round and semi-finals.

- **Bold** – Game or series winner
- Italic – Team with home-court advantage

== Statistics ==
Legend
| GP | Games played | GS | Games started | MPG | Minutes per game | RPG | Rebounds per game |
| APG | Assists per game | SPG | Steals per game | BPG | Blocks per game | PPG | Points per game |
| FG% | Field-goal percentage | 3P% | 3-point field-goal percentage | FT% | Free-throw percentage | TO | Turnovers per game |
| PF | Fouls per game | | Team leader | | League leader |

=== Regular season ===
| Player | GP | GS | MPG | FG% | 3P% | FT% | PPG | RPG | APG | SPG | BPG |
|---|---|---|---|---|---|---|---|---|---|---|---|
| Candace Parker | 31 | 30 | 30.6 | .471 | .345 | .808 | 17.9 | 8.2 | 4.7 | 1.2 | 1.1 |
| Nneka Ogwumike | 27 | 27 | 30.8 | .525 | .346 | .816 | 15.5 | 6.8 | 2.0 | 1.6 | 0.4 |
| Chelsea Gray | 34 | 34 | 32.7 | .484 | .392 | .835 | 14.9 | 3.4 | 5.1 | 1.4 | 0.2 |
| Odyssey Sims | 34 | 24 | 25.5 | .388 | .273 | .722 | 8.2 | 2.5 | 2.8 | 0.6 | 0.0 |
| Essence Carson | 34 | 15 | 23.1 | .435 | .361 | .938 | 7.5 | 2.6 | 0.9 | 0.9 | 0.4 |
| Riquna Williams | 33 | 3 | 16.5 | .407 | .375 | .800 | 7.1 | 1.4 | 0.7 | 0.7 | 0.1 |
| Jantel Lavender | 30 | 7 | 17.0 | .428 | .188 | .900 | 5.2 | 3.7 | 0.7 | 0.4 | 0.2 |
| Alana Beard | 30 | 30 | 25.5 | .392 | .400 | .810 | 4.0 | 3.3 | 1.7 | 1.5 | 0.2 |
| Maria Vadeeva | 25 | 0 | 8.2 | .527 | .333 | .750 | 3.6 | 2.2 | 0.4 | 0.4 | 0.4 |
| Karlie Samuelson | 20 | 0 | 4.2 | .389 | .313 | .000 | 1.0 | 0.5 | 0.3 | 0.1 | 0.3 |
| Sydney Wiese | 11 | 0 | 3.3 | .000 | .000 | .000 | 0.0 | 0.3 | 0.2 | 0.0 | 0.0 |

== Awards and honors ==
| Recipient | Award | Date awarded | Ref. |
|---|---|---|---|
| Chelsea Gray | WNBA Western Conference Player of the Week | May 29, 2018 | |
| Candace Parker | WNBA Western Conference Player of the Week | July 15, 2018 | |
| Nneka Ogwumike | WNBA All-Star Selection | July 17, 2018 | |
| Chelsea Gray | WNBA All-Star Selection | July 17, 2018 | |
| Candace Parker | WNBA All-Star Captain | July 17, 2018 | |
| Candace Parker | WNBA Western Conference Player of the Week | August 6, 2018 | |
| Alana Beard | WNBA Defensive Player of the Year Award | August 31, 2018 | |
