= 2018 Indiana Fever season =

19th season in the WNBA

- Head coach: Pokey Chatman
- Arena: Bankers Life Fieldhouse

Results
- Record: 6–28 (.176)
- Place: 6th (Eastern)
- Playoff finish: Did not qualify

Media
- Television: Fox Sports Indiana, WNDY-TV, ESPN2, NBATV

The 2018 Indiana Fever season was the franchise's 19th season in the WNBA and their 2nd season under head coach, Pokey Chatman. The Fever began play on May 19, 2018.

The Fever started the season poorly by going 0–5 in May. Fortunes did not improve in June and the team was 1–10. The only win was 96–64 against the Atlanta Dream. However, June did include some close losses. The Fever lost to the New York Liberty 78–75 after the Liberty made a 3-pointer with 16.1 seconds left. On the 12th, the Fever lost in overtime against the Las Vegas Aces. In July, the Fever were 2–8, with the two wins coming against the perennial play-off contenders Minnesota Lynx and Los Angeles Sparks. Both wins were away from home, which meant the Fever were 0–4 at home. In the final month of the season, the Fever were 3–5. They finished with a WNBA worst 6–28 final record, which was also their worst record in franchise history. Their misfortunes continued in the offseason as they lost in the draft lottery in spite of having the best odds, ending with the third selection for the 2019 WNBA draft.

== Transactions ==
=== WNBA draft ===
The Fever made three selections in the 2018 WNBA entry draft, held on April 12:

Round	Pick	Player	Nationality	School/Team/Country
1	2	Kelsey Mitchell	United States	Ohio State
1	8	Victoria Vivians	United States	Mississippi State
2	14	Stephanie Mavunga	United States	Ohio State

=== Trades ===
Date	Trade
February 1, 2018	Acquired C Kayla Alexander and 2019 WNBA Draft third-round pick via trade from Las Vegas Aces for 2019 WNBA Draft second-round pick.
March 6, 2018	Acquired 8th overall pick in the 2018 WNBA Draft via trade from Phoenix Mercury for Briann January.

=== Personnel changes ===
==== Additions ====
Player	Signed	Former team
Hind Ben Abdelkader	February 14, 2018	Hatay
Cappie Pondexter	July 1, 2017	Los Angeles Sparks

==== Subtractions ====
Player	Left	New team
Briann January	March 6, 2018	Phoenix Mercury
Hind Ben Abdelkader	July 1, 2017	TBA

== Roster ==
2018 Indiana Fever roster
Players
Coaches

Pos.	No.	Nat.	Name	Height	Weight	DOB	From	Yrs
F	11	(Canada)	Achonwa, Natalie	6' 3" (1.91m)	190 lb (86kg)	1992-11-22	Notre Dame	3
C	40	(Canada)	Alexander, Kayla	6' 4" (1.93m)	195 lb (88kg)	1991-01-05	Syracuse	5
F	4	(United States)	Dupree, Candice	6' 2" (1.88m)	178 lb (81kg)	1984-02-25	Temple	12
F	31	(United States)	Taylor, Asia	6' 1" (1.85m)	167 lb (76kg)	1991-08-22	Louisville	3
G	42	(United States)	Johnson, Shenise	5' 11" (1.8m)	172 lb (78kg)	1990-12-09	Miami (FL)	6
F	23	(United States)	Mavunga, Stephanie	6' 3" (1.91m)	205 lb (93kg)	1995-02-24	Ohio State	R
F	22	(United States)	McCall, Erica	6' 2" (1.88m)	184 lb (83kg)	1995-08-21	Stanford	1
G	3	(United States)	Mitchell, Tiffany	5' 9" (1.75m)	152 lb (69kg)	1984-09-23	South Carolina	3
G	0	(United States)	Mitchell, Kelsey	5' 8" (1.73m)	160 lb (73kg)	1995-11-12	Ohio State	R
G	25	(United States)	Pondexter, Cappie	5' 9" (1.75m)	160 lb (73kg)	1983-01-07	Rutgers	12
G	35	(United States)	Vivians, Victoria	6' 1" (1.85m)	183 lb (83kg)	1994-11-17	Mississippi State	R
G	17	(United States)	Wheeler, Erica	5' 7" (1.7m)	143 lb (65kg)	1991-05-02	Rutgers	3

Head coach
(United States) Pokey Chatman (LSU)
Assistant coaches
(United States) Christie Sides (Louisiana Tech)
(United States) Jessica Miller (UIC)
Athletic trainer
(United States) Todd Champlin (Daemen)
Strength and conditioning coach
(United States) Chase Campbell (Ball State)

Legend

- (C) Team captain
- (DP) Unsigned draft pick
- (FA) Free agent
- (S) Suspended
- Injured

== Schedule ==
=== Preseason ===
2018 pre-season game log
May: 1–1 (Home: 1–0; Road: 0–1)

Game	Date	Team	Score	High points	High rebounds	High assists	Location Attendance	Record
1	May 7	Chicago	W 79–65	Mavunga (18)	Tied (8)	Peterson (4)	Bankers Life Fieldhouse; 4,377	1–0
2	May 12	Washington	L 56–91	K. Mitchell (9)	Mavunga (4)	K. Mitchell (3)	Acierno Arena (University of Delaware); 3,323	1–1

2018 pre-season schedule

=== Regular season ===
2018 game log
Total: 6–28 (Home: 2–15 Road: 4–13)
May: 0–5 (Home: 0–3; Road: 0–2)

Game	Date	Team	Score	High points	High rebounds	High assists	Location Attendance	Record
1	May 19	Chicago	L 64–82	Dupree (14)	Dupree (8)	Wheeler (4)	Bankers Life Fieldhouse; 6,565	0–1
2	May 20	@ Washington	L 75–82	Achonwa (21)	Achonwa (12)	Wheeler (5)	Capital One Arena; 7,400	0–2
3	May 22	Los Angeles	L 70–87	K. Mitchell (20)	Achonwa (8)	K. Mitchell (4)	Bankers Life Fieldhouse; 4,742	0–3
4	May 24	Washington	L 84–93	K. Mitchell (25)	Dupree (7)	T. Mitchell (3)	Bankers Life Fieldhouse; 4,415	0–4
5	May 26	@ Connecticut	L 77–86	K. Mitchell (18)	McCall (9)	Wheeler (9)	Mohegan Sun Arena; 5,843	0–5

June: 1–10 (Home: 1–5; Road: 0–5)

Game	Date	Team	Score	High points	High rebounds	High assists	Location Attendance	Record
6	June 2	New York	L 81–87	K. Mitchell (26)	Dupree (8)	Wheeler (7)	Bankers Life Fieldhouse; 5,575	0–6
7	June 8	Dallas	L 83–89	K. Mitchell (26)	McCall (11)	Tied (4)	Bankers Life Fieldhouse; 5,675	0–7
8	June 10	@ New York	L 75–78	K. Mitchell (19)	Achonwa (10)	T. Mitchell (7)	Westchester County Center; 1,537	0–8
9	June 12	Las Vegas	L 92–101 (OT)	Achonwa (26)	Achonwa (15)	Wheeler (8)	Bankers Life Fieldhouse; 5,437	0–9
10	June 14	@ Atlanta	L 67–72	Dupree (17)	Tied (7)	Wheeler (10)	McCamish Pavilion; 6,561	0–10
11	June 16	Atlanta	W 96–64	Vivians (21)	Tied (6)	K. Mitchell (5)	Bankers Life Fieldhouse; 6,234	1–10
12	June 19	@ Los Angeles	L 55–74	Achonwa (13)	Achonwa (14)	K. Mitchell (3)	Staples Center; 8,857	1–11
13	June 22	@ Seattle	L 63–72	Dupree (15)	Tied (7)	Wheeler (4)	KeyArena; 8,142	1–12
14	June 24	Connecticut	L 78–87	Achonwa (16)	Dupree (8)	K. Mitchell (4)	Bankers Life Fieldhouse; 5,458	1–13
15	June 27	@ Connecticut	L 89–101	Vivians (25)	Achonwa (6)	3 Tied (3)	Mohegan Sun Arena; 5,112	1–14
16	June 29	Phoenix	L 77–95	K. Mitchell (19)	Dupree (6)	Vivians (4)	Bankers Life Fieldhouse; 7,241	1–15

July: 2–8 (Home: 0–4; Road: 2–4)

Game	Date	Team	Score	High points	High rebounds	High assists	Location Attendance	Record
17	July 1	Atlanta	L 83–87	Vivians (27)	Tied (7)	K. Mitchell (4)	Bankers Life Fieldhouse; 5,277	1–16
18	July 3	@ Minnesota	W 71–59	Achonwa (17)	Tied (9)	K. Mitchell (5)	Target Center; 8,632	2–16
19	July 5	@ Dallas	L 63–90	Dupree (21)	Tied (5)	Wheeler (3)	College Park Center; 4,043	2–17
20	July 11	Minnesota	L 65–87	Wheeler (12)	Tied (6)	Wheeler (5)	Bankers Life Fieldhouse; 10,006	2–18
21	July 13	@ Atlanta	L 74–98	T. Mitchell (17)	T. Mitchell (6)	Wheeler (4)	McCamish Pavilion; 3,807	2–19
22	July 15	Phoenix	L 82–101	Dupree (23)	Dupree (9)	Tied (4)	Bankers Life Fieldhouse; 6,302	2–20
23	July 18	@ Minnesota	L 65–89	Dupree (20)	Tied (4)	Tied (4)	Target Center; 17,933	2–21
24	July 20	@ Los Angeles	W 78–76	Tied (16)	Achonwa (9)	Tied (5)	Staples Center; 10,532	3–21
25	July 22	@ Las Vegas	L 74–88	Achonwa (21)	Tied (7)	Pondexter (7)	Mandalay Bay Events Center; 5,368	3–22
26	July 24	Seattle	L 72–92	K. Mitchell (26)	Dupree (12)	Tied (4)	Bankers Life Fieldhouse; 5,908	3–23

August : 3–5 (Home: 1–3; Road: 2–2)

Game	Date	Team	Score	High points	High rebounds	High assists	Location Attendance	Record
27	August 2	Dallas	W 84–78	Pondexter (18)	Achonwa (5)	Wheeler (5)	Bankers Life Fieldhouse; 5,981	4–23
28	August 4	@ New York	W 68–55	Dupree (25)	Achonwa (13)	Wheeler (7)	Westchester County Center; 2,225	5–23
29	August 7	Seattle	L 79–94	Dupree (22)	Dupree (8)	Pondexter (5)	Bankers Life Fieldhouse; 6,401	5–24
30	August 10	@ Phoenix	L 74–97	K. Mitchell (20)	T. Mitchell (9)	K. Mitchell (4)	Talking Stick Resort Arena; 8,860	5–25
31	August 11	@ Las Vegas	L 74–92	Wheeler (13)	T. Mitchell (8)	Tied (5)	Mandalay Bay Events Center; 5,213	5–26
32	August 15	Washington	L 62–76	Achonwa (15)	Vivians (9)	Wheeler (5)	Bankers Life Fieldhouse; 7,636	5–27
33	August 18	Chicago	L 106–115	Dupree (30)	Achonwa (11)	Tied (7)	Bankers Life Fieldhouse; 8,442	5–28
34	August 19	@ Chicago	W 97–92	Tied (22)	Achonwa (9)	Tied (6)	Wintrust Arena; 7,118	6–28

2018 season schedule

=== Standings ===
#	Eastern Conference	W	L	PCT	GB	Home	Road	Conf.
1	Atlanta Dream (2)	23	11	.676	–	13–4	10–7	12–4
2	Washington Mystics (3)	22	12	.647	1	12–5	10–7	12–4
3	Connecticut Sun (4)	21	13	.618	2	13–4	8–9	9–7
4	e – Chicago Sky	13	21	.382	10	7–10	6–11	6–10
5	e – New York Liberty	7	27	.206	16	4–13	3–14	6–10
6	e – Indiana Fever	6	28	.176	17	2–15	4–13	3–13

== Awards and honors ==
Recipient	Award	Date awarded	Ref.
Candice Dupree	WNBA Cares Community Assist Award	September 4, 2018	

== Statistics ==
Legend
GP	Games played	GS	Games started	MPG	Minutes per game	RPG	Rebounds per game
APG	Assists per game	SPG	Steals per game	BPG	Blocks per game	PPG	Points per game
FG%	Field-goal percentage	3P%	3-point field-goal percentage	FT%	Free-throw percentage	TO	Turnovers per game
PF	Fouls per game		Team leader		League leader

=== Regular season ===
Player	GP	GS	MPG	FG%	3P%	FT%	RPG	APG	SPG	BPG	PPG
Candice Dupree	32	32	31.4	48.8	0.0	81.9	6.4	1.7	0.9	0.3	14.2
Kelsey Mitchell	34	17	24.4	34.6	33.5	80.4	1.8	2.7	0.7	0.1	12.7
Natalie Achonwa	34	34	26.0	52.7	0.0	80.0	6.9	1.4	0.9	0.7	10.3
Cappie Pondexter	17	14	24.2	38.9	39.3	84.6	2.4	2.6	0.7	0.0	10.2
Tiffany Mitchell	34	20	25.6	37.1	26.7	83.5	3.1	2.3	0.9	0.2	9.1
Victoria Vivians	34	26	27.1	40.4	39.9	93.1	3.1	1.2	0.9	0.1	8.9
Erica Wheeler	34	22	21.7	35.1	27.6	79.7	2.9	4.1	0.8	0.2	7.8
Erica McCall	34	2	12.3	38.5	12.5	68.4	2.7	0.4	0.4	0.5	2.9
Kayla Alexander	30	0	8.6	54.1	0.0	82.4	2.2	0.2	0.1	0.3	2.7
Stephanie Mavunga	25	0	7.8	47.7	0.0	80.0	2.2	0.2	0.3	0.2	2.2
Asia Taylor	14	0	8.3	31.0	20.0	77.8	1.8	0.4	0.2	0.0	1.9
