= Amber Stocks =

American basketball coach

Amber B. Stocks
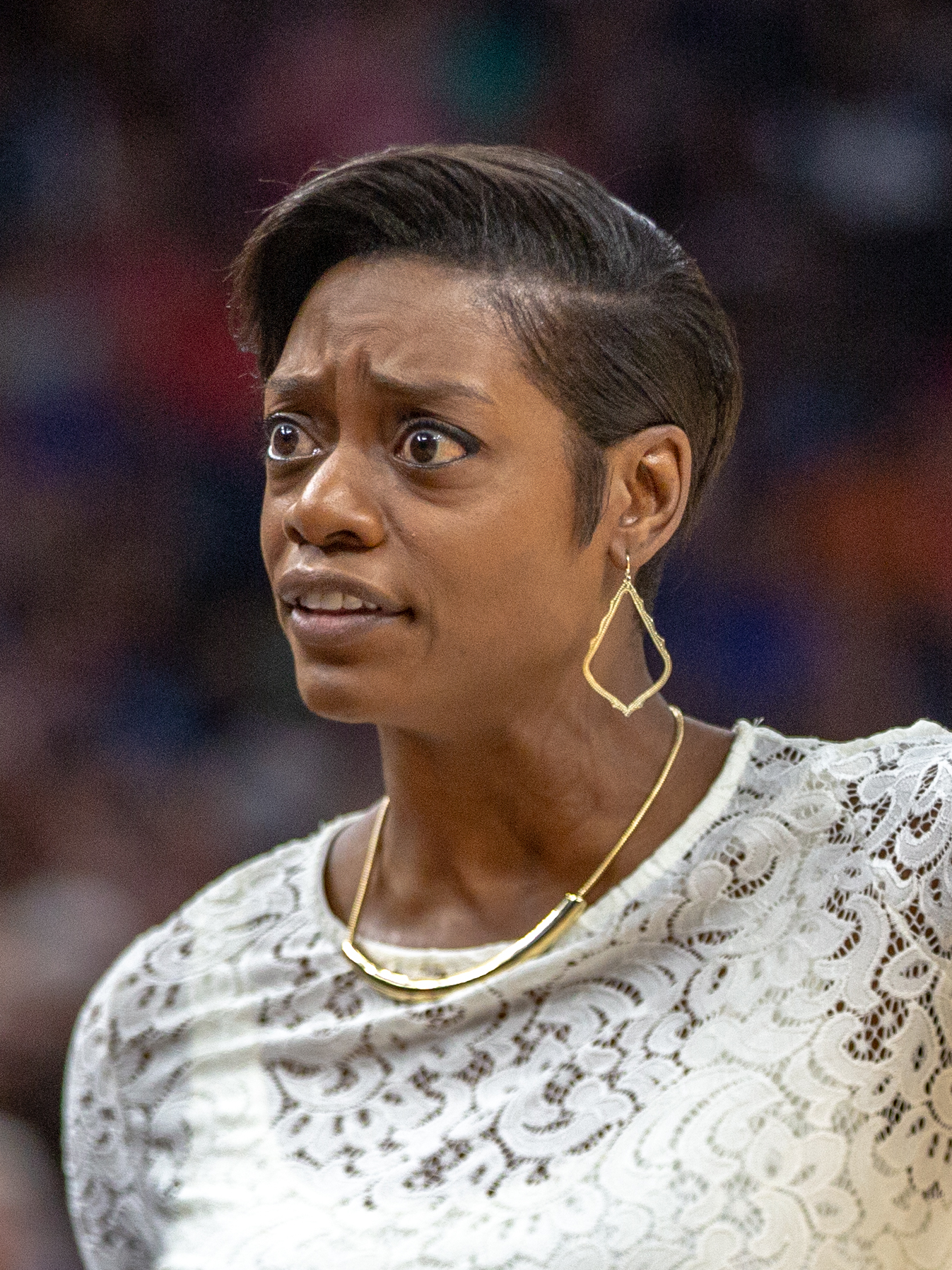
- Stocks in August 2018

Personal information
- Born: Akron, Ohio, U.S.

Career information
- College: Univ. of Cincinnati
- Position: Small forward

Career history

Coaching
- Univ. of Tennessee (assistant to Pat Summitt)
- Xavier Univ. (assistant to Kevin McGuff)
- 2015–2016: Los Angeles Sparks (assistant to Brian Agler)
- 2017–2018: Chicago Sky(General Manager & Head Coach)

Career highlights
- WNBA champion (2016)

Amber "AB" Stocks is an American basketball executive consultant, coach, and former player. She was most notably the General Manager and Head Coach of the Chicago Sky in the Women's National Basketball Association (WNBA). Stocks was as an assistant coach for two years with the Los Angeles Sparks, including the 2016 WNBA Championship, after coaching for many years in the college and amateur ranks. Stocks played collegiate basketball for the University of Cincinnati, then earned a Master of Education from Xavier University and a Juris Doctor from the University of Dayton. In 2018, she transitioned to full-time strategic consulting. Stocks is an active analyst, speaker, and contributor to the applied sciences of sports.

== Coaching record ==
Legend
Regular season	G	Games coached	W	Games won	L	Games lost	W–L %	Win–loss %
Playoffs	PG	Playoff games	PW	Playoff wins	PL	Playoff losses	PW–L %	Playoff win–loss %

Team	Year	G	W	L	W–L%	Finish	PG	PW	PL	PW–L%	Result
CHI	2017	34	12	22	.353	5th in East	—	—	—	—	Missed Playoffs
CHI	2018	34	13	21	.382	4th in East	—	—	—	—	Missed Playoffs
Career		68	25	43	.368		—	—	—	—	
