= 2018 Seattle Storm season =

- WNBA champions
- Head coach: Dan Hughes
- Arena: KeyArena

Results
- Record: 26–8 (.765)
- Place: 1st (Western)
- Playoff finish: 1st seed; WNBA Champions, beat Washington Mystics 3–0 in 2018 WNBA Finals

Media
- Television: KZJO (JOEtv)

The 2018 WNBA season was the 19th season for the Seattle Storm of the Women's National Basketball Association. The regular season began May 20 and ended on August 19.

The Storm started the season strongly posting a 5–1 record in May. Their only loss came in the opening game of the season against the Phoenix Mercury. The storm had their worst month of the season in June, going 6–4. The team couldn't string together a run of wins, alternating between winning 2 and losing one. The team found their stride in July with a strong 9–2 record. The month started with a 4-game winning streak, and the team won 7 of its first 8. The only losses in July came in over time to Los Angeles and to eventual #2 playoff seed Atlanta. August was another good month for the Storm. The team went 6–1 in the month, with their only loss being at eventual #3 playoff seed Washington. The team's final record of 26–8 was their best since 2010. This record earned them the #1 seed in the 2018 WNBA Playoffs and a bye into the Semifinals.

The Storm faced off against the #5 seed Phoenix Mercury in the Semifinals. The series was a hotly contested series, with both teams making large runs in individual games. Eventually the home team won each game in the series, which meant the Storm advanced 3–2. In the WNBA Finals, the Storm swept the Washington Mystics in three games, securing the third championship in franchise history.

== Transactions ==
=== WNBA draft ===
Round	Pick	Player	Nationality	School/Team/Country
1	5	Jordin Canada	United States	UCLA
3	29	Teana Muldrow	United States	West Virginia

=== Trades and roster changes ===
Date	Details
February 1, 2018	Re-signed G Sami Whitcomb
February 2, 2018	Signed C Courtney Paris
February 5, 2018	Re-signed G Noelle Quinn
February 7, 2018	Acquired F Natasha Howard from Minnesota Lynx in exchange for the 17th pick in the 2018 WNBA draft. Minnesota also gains right to swap 1st round picks in 2019.

== Roster ==
2018 Seattle Storm roster
Players
Coaches

Pos.	No.	Nat.	Name	Height	Weight	DOB	From	Yrs
G	10	(United States)	Bird, Sue	5' 9" (1.75m)	150 lb (68kg)	1980-10-16	Connecticut	15
G	21	(United States)	Canada, Jordin	5' 6" (1.68m)		1995-08-11	UCLA	R
F	32	(United States)	Clark, Alysha	5' 11" (1.8m)	167 lb (76kg)	1987-07-07	Middle Tennessee	6
F	6	(United States)	Howard, Natasha	6' 2" (1.88m)	165 lb (75kg)	1991-09-02	Florida State	4
F/C	1	(United States)	Langhorne, Crystal	6' 2" (1.88m)	185 lb (84kg)	1986-10-27	Maryland	10
G	24	(United States)	Loyd, Jewell	5' 10" (1.78m)	148 lb (67kg)	1993-10-05	Notre Dame	3
F	23	(United States)	Mosqueda-Lewis, Kaleena	5' 11" (1.8m)	180 lb (82kg)	1993-11-03	Connecticut	3
C	3	(United States)	Paris, Courtney	6' 4" (1.93m)	250 lb (113kg)	1987-97-21	Oklahoma	8
G	45	(United States)	Quinn, Noelle	6' 0" (1.83m)	178 lb (81kg)	1985-01-03	UCLA	11
G	2	(United States)	Russell, Mercedes	6' 6" (1.98m)		1995-07-27	Tennessee	R
F	30	(United States)	Stewart, Breanna	6' 4" (1.93m)	170 lb (77kg)	1994-08-27	Connecticut	2
G/F	33	(Australia)	Whitcomb, Sami	5' 10" (1.78m)	145 lb (66kg)	1988-07-20	Washington	1

Head coach
(United States) Dan Hughes (Muskingum)
Assistant coaches
(United States) Gary Kloppenburg (UC San Diego)
(United States) Crystal Robinson (SE Oklahoma State)
Athletic trainer
(United States) Tom Spencer (Central Washington)

Legend

- (C) Team captain
- (DP) Unsigned draft pick
- (FA) Free agent
- (S) Suspended
- Injured

== Game log ==
=== Preseason ===
2018 pre-season game log
May: 2–0 (Home: 1–0; Road: 1–0)

Game	Date	Team	Score	High points	High rebounds	High assists	Location Attendance	Record
1	May 8	Phoenix	W 73–69	3 Tied (15)	Howard (6)	Tied (3)	KeyArena; 3,502	1–0
2	May 12	Phoenix	W 84–61	Canada (17)	Stewart (8)	Bird (5)	Talking Stick Resort Arena; 4,535	2–0

2018 pre-season schedule

=== Regular season ===
2018 game log
Total: 26–8 (Home: 13–4; Road: 13–4)
May: 5–1 (Home: 3–1; Road: 2–0)

Game	Date	Team	Score	High points	High rebounds	High assists	Location Attendance	Record
1	May 20	Phoenix	L 82–87	Stewart (22)	Stewart (15)	Bird (5)	KeyArena; 8,602	0–1
2	May 23	@ Phoenix	W 87–71	Loyd (29)	Stewart (11)	Bird (5)	Talking Stick Resort Arena; 8,068	1–1
3	May 25	Chicago	W 95–91	Loyd (29)	Howard (10)	Bird (9)	KeyArena; 5,866	2–1
4	May 27	@ Las Vegas	W 105–98	Stewart (23)	Stewart (9)	Loyd (9)	Mandalay Bay Events Center; 7,662	3–1
5	May 29	Washington	W 81–77	Loyd (27)	Loyd (8)	Bird (7)	KeyArena; 4,453	4–1
6	May 31	Las Vegas	W 101–74	Stewart (21)	Russell (8)	Bird (9)	KeyArena; 5,235	5–1

June : 6–4 (Home: 4–2; Road: 2–2)

Game	Date	Team	Score	High points	High rebounds	High assists	Location Attendance	Record
7	June 2	@ Dallas	L 90–94	Stewart (28)	Howard (9)	Canada (9)	College Park Center; 5,191	5–2
8	June 7	@ Los Angeles	W 88–63	Clark (17)	Howard (9)	Bird (8)	Staples Center; 9,204	6–2
9	June 10	Atlanta	L 64–67	Howard (15)	Howard (15)	Tied (3)	KeyArena; 6,345	6–3
10	June 12	Chicago	W 96–85	Stewart (30)	Paris (8)	Tied (5)	KeyArena; 4,353	7–3
11	June 15	Connecticut	W 103–92	Howard (25)	Stewart (9)	Tied (5)	KeyArena; 7,094	8–3
12	June 19	Las Vegas	L 77–87	Stewart (27)	Tied (8)	Loyd (7)	KeyArena; 6,395	8–4
13	June 22	Indiana	W 72–63	Loyd (25)	Howard (9)	Bird (7)	KeyArena; 8,142	9–4
14	June 24	@ Dallas	W 97–76	Stewart (28)	Stewart (12)	Bird (10)	College Park Center; 4,084	10–4
15	June 26	@ Minnesota	L 79–91	Stewart (27)	Paris (8)	Bird (9)	Target Center; 8,634	10–5
16	June 28	Los Angeles	W 81–72	Stewart (27)	3 Tied (8)	Bird (11)	KeyArena; 8,447	11–5

July : 9–2 (Home: 3–1; Road: 6–1)

Game	Date	Team	Score	High points	High rebounds	High assists	Location Attendance	Record
17	July 1	Connecticut	W 84–70	Howard (13)	Howard (8)	Bird (9)	KeyArena; 9,307	12–5
18	July 3	@ New York	W 77–62	Tied (21)	Stewart (8)	Bird (11)	Westchester County Center; 1,749	13–5
19	July 6	@ Atlanta	W 95–86	Stewart (29)	Howard (11)	Bird (10)	McCamish Pavilion; 3,935	14–5
20	July 8	Washington	W 97–91	Stewart (25)	Stewart (10)	Bird (5)	KeyArena; 8,724	15–5
21	July 10	Los Angeles	L 75–77 (OT)	Howard (18)	Stewart (13)	Bird (8)	KeyArena; 9,686	15–6
22	July 14	Dallas	W 91–84	Stewart (35)	Stewart (10)	Loyd (6)	KeyArena; 9,686	16–6
23	July 18	@ Chicago	W 101–83	Stewart (30)	Loyd (10)	Bird (11)	Wintrust Arena; 10,024	17–6
24	July 20	@ Connecticut	W 78–65	Loyd (31)	Tied (6)	Bird (5)	Mohegan Sun Arena; 7,908	18–6
25	July 22	@ Atlanta	L 74–87	Stewart (31)	Stewart (8)	Bird (6)	McCamish Pavilion; 4,916	18–7
26	July 24	@ Indiana	W 92–72	Stewart (26)	Stewart (10)	Bird (11)	Bankers Life Fieldhouse; 5,908	19–7
27	July 31	@ Phoenix	W 102–91	Loyd (29)	Howard (10)	Bird (5)	Talking Stick Resort Arena; 10,005	20–7

August : 6–1 (Home: 4–0; Road: 2–1)

Game	Date	Team	Score	High points	High rebounds	High assists	Location Attendance	Record
28	August 3	Minnesota	W 85–75	Stewart (20)	Stewart (7)	Bird (11)	KeyArena; 12,064	21–7
29	August 6	@ New York	W 96–80	Stewart (32)	Howard (10)	Tied (7)	Madison Square Garden; 12,488	22–7
30	August 7	@ Indiana	W 94–79	Howard (19)	Stewart (12)	Tied (8)	Bankers Life Fieldhouse; 6,401	23–7
31	August 9	@ Washington	L 77–100	Tied (15)	Langhorne (5)	3 Tied (4)	Capital One Arena; 6,808	23–8
32	August 12	@ Minnesota	W 81–72	Howard (21)	Stewart (17)	Loyd (6)	Target Center; 9,123	24–8
33	August 17	New York	W 85–77	Stewart (22)	Stewart (15)	Bird (6)	KeyArena; 10,873	25–8
34	August 19	Dallas	W 84–68	Tied (15)	Russell (9)	Canada (5)	KeyArena; 12,574	26–8

2018 season schedule

=== Playoffs ===
2018 playoff game log
Total: 6–2 (Home: 5–0; Road: 1–2)
WNBA Semifinals: 3–2 (Home: 3–0; Road: 0–2)

Game	Date	Team	Score	High points	High rebounds	High assists	Location Attendance	Series
1	August 26	Phoenix	W 91–87	Stewart (28)	Stewart (7)	Bird (10)	KeyArena; 9,686	1–0
2	August 28	Phoenix	W 91–87 (OT)	Stewart (27)	Langhorne (10)	Bird (6)	KeyArena; 9,686	2–0
3	August 31	@ Phoenix	L 66–86	Howard (19)	Stewart (11)	Bird (11)	Talking Stick Resort Arena; 15,185	2–1
4	September 2	@ Phoenix	L 84–86	Stewart (22)	Bird (9)	Bird (7)	Talking Stick Resort Arena; 8,137	2–2
5	September 4	Phoenix	W 94–84	Stewart (28)	Clark (13)	Bird (5)	KeyArena; 8,992	3–2

WNBA Finals: 3–0 (Home: 2–0; Road: 1–0)

Game	Date	Team	Score	High points	High rebounds	High assists	Location Attendance	Series
1	September 7	Washington	W 89–76	Loyd (23)	Clark, Howard, Loyd (5)	Bird (7)	KeyArena; 11,486	1–0
2	September 9	Washington	W 75–73	Stewart (19)	Howard (11)	Bird (4)	KeyArena; 14,212	2–0
3	September 12	@ Washington	W 98–82	Stewart (30)	Howard (14)	Bird (10)	EagleBank Arena; 9,164	3–0

2018 playoff schedule

== Awards and honors ==
Recipient	Award	Date awarded	Ref.
Breanna Stewart	WNBA Western Conference Player of the Week	June 18, 2018	
Sue Bird	WNBA All-Star Selection	July 17, 2018	
Jewell Loyd	WNBA All-Star Selection	July 17, 2018	
Breanna Stewart	WNBA All-Star Selection	July 17, 2018	
Breanna Stewart	WNBA Western Conference Player of the Month - July	August 1, 2018	
Alysha Clark	WNBA Cares Community Assist Award - July	August 17, 2018	
Breanna Stewart	WNBA Most Valuable Player Award	August 26, 2018	
Natasha Howard	WNBA Most Improved Player Award	August 26, 2018	
Sue Bird	Kim Perrot Sportsmanship Award	August 26, 2018	
Breanna Stewart	WNBA Finals MVP	September 12, 2018	

== Standings ==
#	Western Conference	W	L	PCT	GB	Home	Road	Conf.
1	Seattle Storm (1)	26	8	.765	–	13–4	13–4	11–5
2	Phoenix Mercury (5)	20	14	.588	6	9–8	11–6	8–8
3	Los Angeles Sparks (6)	19	15	.559	7	11–6	8–9	9–7
4	Minnesota Lynx (7)	18	16	.529	8	9–8	9–8	9–7
5	Dallas Wings (8)	15	19	.441	11	10–7	5–12	7–9
6	e –Las Vegas Aces	14	20	.412	12	8–9	6–11	4–12

Notes

(#) – Conference Standing, Playoff Seeds shown to the right of team name
x – Qualified for playoffs
e – Eliminated from playoffs

== Playoffs ==
**First round** Single elimination (Aug. 21)
5	**Phoenix Mercury**	**101**
8	Dallas Wings	83
6	**Los Angeles Sparks**	**75**
7	Minnesota Lynx	68

**Second round** Single elimination (Aug. 23)
4	Connecticut Sun	86
5	**Phoenix Mercury**	**96**
3	**Washington Mystics**	**96**
6	Los Angeles Sparks	64

**Semifinals**; Best-of-5 (Aug. 26 – Sept. 4)
1	**Seattle Storm**	**3**
5	Phoenix Mercury	2
2	Atlanta Dream	2
3	**Washington Mystics**	**3**

**WNBA Finals**; Best-of-5 (Sept. 7 – Sept. 12)
1	**Seattle Storm**	**3**
3	Washington Mystics	0

Note: Teams re-seeded after second round and semi-finals.

- **Bold** – Game or series winner
- Italic – Team with home-court advantage

== Statistics ==
Legend
GP	Games played	GS	Games started	MPG	Minutes per game	RPG	Rebounds per game
APG	Assists per game	SPG	Steals per game	BPG	Blocks per game	PPG	Points per game
FG%	Field-goal percentage	3P%	3-point field-goal percentage	FT%	Free-throw percentage	TO	Turnovers per game
PF	Fouls per game		Team leader		League leader

=== Regular season ===
Player	GP	GS	MPG	FG%	3P%	FT%	RPG	APG	SPG	BPG	PPG
Breanna Stewart	34	34	31.6	.529	.415	.820	8.4	2.5	1.4	1.4	21.8
Jewell Loyd	34	34	29.7	.423	.370	.851	4.6	3.7	1.3	0.1	15.5
Natasha Howard	34	33	25.6	.547	.327	.798	6.4	1.0	1.3	2.0	13.2
Sue Bird	31	31	26.6	.466	.448	.828	1.7	7.1	1.1	0.1	10.1
Alysha Clark	31	30	26.2	.480	.392	.846	3.5	1.9	1.0	0.1	7.4
Jordin Canada	33	2	16.5	.357	.182	.738	1.5	3.3	0.9	0.0	5.7
Kaleena Mosqueda-Lewis	33	4	13.4	.412	.420	.917	1.5	0.8	0.1	0.0	5.4
Crystal Langhorne	26	1	13.9	.500	.000	.889	3.0	0.3	0.3	0.2	4.6
Sami Whitcomb	31	0	8.5	.349	.362	1.000	0.9	0.5	0.5	0.1	2.9
Courtney Paris	34	0	10.6	.533	.000	.529	3.9	0.6	0.2	0.3	2.1
Mercedes Russell	22	0	4.6	.484	.000	.500	1.4	0.1	0.0	0.1	1.6
Noelle Quinn	20	1	9.1	.302	.235	.000	0.9	0.7	0.1	0.1	1.5
