= Blake Dietrick =

American basketball player (born 1993)

Personal information
- Born: July 19, 1993 (age 33) Wellesley, Massachusetts, U.S.
- Listed height: 5 ft 10 in (1.78 m)
- Listed weight: 169 lb (77 kg)

Career information
- High school: Wellesley (Wellesley, Massachusetts)
- College: Princeton (2011–2015)
- WNBA draft: 2015: undrafted
- Playing career: 2016–present
- Position: Point guard
- Number: 13

Career history
- 2016: Seattle Storm
- 2016: San Antonio Stars
- 2016–2017: Bendigo Spirit
- 2017–2018: AO Dafni Agioy Dimitriou
- 2018: Atlanta Dream
- 2018–2020: Gernika KESB
- 2019: Seattle Storm
- 2021: Atlanta Dream
- 2021–2022: Le Mura Lucca
- 2022–2023: ASVEL Féminin
- 2024: Union Féminine Angers Basket 49

Career highlights
- Ivy League Player of the Year (2015); 2x First-team All-Ivy (2014, 2015)
- Stats at Basketball Reference
Medals
Women's 3x3 basketball
Representing the United States
Pan American Games
Gold medal – first place	2023 Santiago	Team
FIBA 3x3 AmeriCup
Gold medal – first place	2021 Miami	Team

Blake Julia Dietrick (born July 19, 1993) is an American professional basketball player who is a free agent. She played previously for the Atlanta Dream and the Seattle Storm in the Women's National Basketball Association (WNBA), and the Gernika KESB in Spain. She played college basketball at Princeton.

== High school and college ==
Born in Wellesley, Massachusetts, Dietrick played basketball for Wellesley High School, where she scored a school record 1,440 career points, leading the team to an 84–9 record during that time. Dietrick was also a three-time All-American in lacrosse, earning first team US Lacrosse honors her sophomore through senior years.

In her final season for Princeton, Dietrick was named Ivy League Player of the Year and chosen as an All-American honorable mention by the Associated Press and Women's Basketball Coaches Association. She also led the Ivy League in assists (4.9/game) while setting her school's single-season assists record (157). Princeton went 30–0 during regular season, won the conference outright, received a bid to the 2015 NCAA Women's Division I Basketball Tournament and advanced to the second round.

== Professional career ==
In 2016, she was chosen as a free agent by the Seattle Storm and played in two games. She later signed a 7-day contract with the San Antonio Stars and played in one game. She then went on to play for a year for the Bendigo Spirit of Australia's WNBL. From 2017 to 2018, she was on the Greek AO Dafni Agioy Dimitriou team.

In 2015, she had training camp stints with the Washington Mystics and Los Angeles Sparks but was later waived.

In the 2022–23 season, she won the Ligue Féminine de Basketball and the EuroCup Women with her team ASVEL Féminin.

== Career statistics ==
Legend
GP	Games played	GS	Games started	MPG	Minutes per game	RPG	Rebounds per game
APG	Assists per game	SPG	Steals per game	BPG	Blocks per game	PPG	Points per game
TO	Turnovers per game	FG%	Field-goal percentage	3P%	3-point field-goal percentage	FT%	Free-throw percentage
**Bold**	Career best	°	League leader

=== WNBA ===
==== Regular season ====
WNBA regular season statistics
Year	Team	GP	GS	MPG	FG%	3P%	FT%	RPG	APG	SPG	BPG	TO	PPG
2016	Seattle	2	0	3.0	—	—	**100.0**	0.0	0.0	0.0	0.0	0.5	1.0
2016	San Antonio	1	0	8.0	**50.0**	0.0	—	**3.0**	0.0	0.0	0.0	**0.0**	2.0
2017	Did not play (did not appear in WNBA)												
2018	Atlanta	**26**	0	7.2	34.3	39.1	66.7	0.5	0.4	0.3	0.0	0.5	1.4
2019	Seattle	17	1	6.2	10.0	0.0	66.7	0.6	0.9	0.2	**0.1**	0.6	0.4
2020	Atlanta	22	**4**	**21.0**	47.1	**44.8**	62.5	1.6	**3.4**	**0.8**	**0.1**	1.8	**5.9**
2021	Atlanta	9	0	15.7	29.6	31.3	—	1.6	1.2	0.6	**0.1**	0.6	2.3
**Career**	6 years, 3 teams	77	5	11.8	39.9	38.5	68.2	1.0	1.5	0.4	0.1	0.9	2.6

==== Playoffs ====
WNBA playoff statistics
Year	Team	GP	GS	MPG	FG%	3P%	FT%	RPG	APG	SPG	BPG	TO	PPG
2018	Atlanta	**3**	0	**5.0**	0.0	0.0	0.0	**1.3**	**0.7**	0.0	0.0	0.0	0.0
2019	Seattle	1	0	0.0	0.0	0.0	0.0	0.0	0.0	0.0	0.0	0.0	0.0
**Career**	2 years, 2 teams	4	0	3.8	0.0	0.0	0.0	1.0	0.5	0.0	0.0	0.0	0.0

=== College ===
†	Denotes seasons in which Princeton won the Ivy League championship

Year	Team	GP	Points	FG%	3P%	FT%	RPG	APG	SPG	BPG	PPG
2011–12†	Princeton	23	91	47.6	**46.3**	80.0	1.6	0.3	0.1	0.1	3.96
2012–13†	Princeton	29	231	39.2	35.6	68.4	3.4	2.8	0.9	0.1	7.97
2013–14	Princeton	30	428	46.4	40.0	**85.2**	**5.3**	3.4	1.2	**0.2**	14.26
2014–15†	Princeton	32	**483**	**48.9**	40.9	70.3	4.5	**4.9**	**1.2**	0.1	**15.09**
Career	Princeton	114	1233	45.9	39.6	75.9	3.6	3.0	0.9	0.1	10.8
