= Nicki Collen =

American basketball player and coach

Current position
- Title: Head coach
- Team: Baylor
- Conference: Big 12
- Record: 132–46 (.742)

Biographical details
- Born: May 13, 1975 (age 51); Indiana, U.S.

Playing career
- 1993–1995: Purdue
- 1995–1997: Marquette
- 1997: BCM Alexandros

Coaching career (HC unless noted)
- 2001–2003: Colorado State (assistant)
- 2003: Ball State (assistant)
- 2003–2005: Louisville (assistant)
- 2011–2014: Arkansas (assistant)
- 2014–2015: Florida Gulf Coast (assistant)
- 2015–2017: Connecticut Sun (assistant)
- 2018–2020: Atlanta Dream
- 2021–present: Baylor

Head coaching record
- Overall: 127–45 (.738) (NCAA); 38–52 (.422) (WNBA)

Accomplishments and honors

Championships
- Big 12 regular season (2022)

Awards
- WNBA Coach of the Year (2018)

Nicole Suzanne Collen (née Taggart; born May 13, 1975) is an American basketball coach and is currently the head women's basketball coach at Baylor University.

== Early life ==
Collen was born in Indiana and her family moved to Platteville, Wisconsin when she was 10 years old. While living in Wisconsin, Collen attended basketball camps with Bo Ryan.

== Playing career ==
Collen began her playing career at Purdue, where she was on a team that made consecutive NCAA Tournament appearances in 1994 and 1995 and won consecutive Big 10 Championships. During her junior year, she transferred to Marquette, where she led the team to consecutive NCAA Tournament appearances. She earned all conference honors while at Marquette and was ranked third nationally in assists during her senior season. After her college career, Collen played one year of professional basketball in Greece with BCM Alexandros.

== College career statistics ==
Legend
GP	Games played	GS	Games started	MPG	Minutes per game	RPG	Rebounds per game
APG	Assists per game	SPG	Steals per game	BPG	Blocks per game	PPG	Points per game
TO	Turnovers per game	FG%	Field-goal percentage	3P%	3-point field-goal percentage	FT%	Free-throw percentage
**Bold**	Career best	°	League leader

Year	Team	GP	GS	MPG	FG%	3P%	FT%	RPG	APG	SPG	BPG	TO	PPG
1993–94	Purdue	28	-	-	22.2	0.0	69.2	0.6	0.8	0.6	0.1	-	0.8
1994–95	Purdue	28	-	-	22.7	18.2	53.8	0.6	1.2	0.3	0.0	-	0.9
1995–96	Sat out due to NCAA transfer rules												
1996–97	Marquette	**31**	-	-	31.9	23.9	**81.5**	**2.8**	6.6	**1.9**	**0.3**	-	6.8
1997–98	Marquette	29	-	-	**38.1**	**37.4**	72.0	2.7	**7.4**	1.6	0.1	-	**9.8**
**Career**		116	-	-	34.5	32.2	74.0	1.7	4.1	1.1	0.1	-	4.7
Statistics retrieved from Sports-Reference.

== Coaching career ==
Collen began her coaching career at Colorado State as an assistant. After her tenure there, she was an assistant at Ball State, Louisville, and Arkansas, before moving to Florida Gulf Coast. While at Florida Gulf Coast, she helped the 2014–2015 team to a historic 31–3 record. Collen coached under Curt Miller with the Connecticut Sun after her time as a college assistant. Collen helped the Sun turn around from a 14–20 finish in 2016 to a 21–13 record in 2017.

On October 30, 2017, Collen was announced as the head coach of the Atlanta Dream. Collen took over for Michael Cooper after the Dream finished 12–22 in 2017.

=== Atlanta Dream ===
Collen led the Dream to a slow start; posting a 2–2 record in May and a 5–6 record in June. June was an up and down month, with the team winning on the road against the Seattle Storm, but giving the Indiana Fever their second win of the season. July saw the team find its form. The Dream posted a 9–2 record, which was tied for the best record in the league. The run moved the team from 9th in the standings to 2nd. Collen led the team on an eight-game win streak including a perfect 4–0 record on the road. For her efforts, Collen was named WNBA Coach of the Month for July. Collen was again selected WNBA Coach of the Month in August. She led the Dream to a 7–1 record, which secured them the number 2 seed in the playoffs and a bye to the semifinals. The team's only loss was to Phoenix on the road. The team finished with a 23–11 record, a franchise best.

On August 28, 2018, it was announced that Collen was selected the WNBA Coach of the Year. She received 37 of 39 possible votes for the award. She is the second Dream coach to win the award.

=== Baylor Bears ===
On May 3, 2021, Collen was hired as the head coach at Baylor following Kim Mulkey's departure to LSU.

== Head coaching record ==
Legend
Regular season	G	Games coached	W	Games won	L	Games lost	W–L %	Win–loss %
Playoffs	PG	Playoff games	PW	Playoff wins	PL	Playoff losses	PW–L %	Playoff win–loss %

Team	Year	G	W	L	W–L%	Finish	PG	PW	PL	PW–L%	Result
ATL	2018	34	23	11	.676	1st in East	5	2	3	.400	Lost in WNBA Semi-Finals
ATL	2019	34	8	26	.235	6th in East	—	—	—	—	Did not qualify
ATL	2020	22	7	15	.318	4th in East	—	—	—	—	Did not qualify
**Career**		90	38	52	.422		5	2	3	.400	

Record table
Season	Team	Overall	Conference	Standing	Postseason
**Baylor Bears** (Big 12 Conference) (2021–present)
2021–22	Baylor	28–7	15–3	1st	NCAA Second Round
2022–23	Baylor	20–13	10–8	T–4th	NCAA Second Round
2023–24	Baylor	26–8	12–6	T–4th	NCAA Sweet Sixteen
2024–25	Baylor	28–8	15–3	2nd	NCAA Second Round
2025–26	Baylor	25–9	13–5	3rd	NCAA Second Round
2026–27	Baylor	5–1	–		
Baylor:		132–46 (.742)	65–25 (.722)		
Total:		132–46 (.742)			
National champion Postseason invitational champion Conference regular season champion Conference regular season and conference tournament champion Division regular season champion Division regular season and conference tournament champion Conference tournament champion

== Personal life ==
Collen is married to basketball coach Tom Collen. The couple have three children. The two met when Tom was an assistant at Purdue when she played there and then he later hired her as his assistant at Colorado State. They married in 2001 and she served as his assistant at Louisville and Arkansas.
