= Imani McGee-Stafford =

American basketball player (born 1994)

No. 34 – Shaanxi Red Wolves
- Position: Center
- League: WCBA

Personal information
- Born: October 11, 1994 (age 32) Inglewood, California, U.S.
- Listed height: 6 ft 7 in (2.01 m)
- Listed weight: 215 lb (98 kg)

Career information
- High school: Windward (Los Angeles, California)
- College: Texas (2012–2016)
- WNBA draft: 2016: 1st round, 10th overall pick
- Drafted by: Chicago Sky
- Playing career: 2016–present

Career history
- 2016–2017: Chicago Sky
- 2016–2017: Bnot Herziliya
- 2017–2018: Atlanta Dream
- 2017: Beijing Great Wall
- 2018: Liaoning Flying Eagles
- 2019: Adana Basketbol
- 2019: Dallas Wings
- 2019: Perth Lynx
- 2023–2024: Shaanxi Red Wolves
- 2023: Jalisco Astros
- 2023: Shaanxi
- 2025-present: Monarcas de Juana Diaz

Career highlights
- WNBA All-Rookie Team (2016); Big 12 Co-Defensive Player of the Year (2016); BSNF Most Valuable Player (2025); BSNF Defensive Player of the Year (2025); Honda Sports Award (2015); Big 12 Female Sportsperson of the Year (2015); 2× First-team All-Big 12 (2015, 2016); Second-team All-Big 12 (2014); 2× Big 12 All-Defensive Team (2013, 2016); Big 12 Freshman of the Year (2013); Big 12 All-Freshman Team (2013); McDonald's All-American (2012)
- Stats at WNBA.com
- Stats at Basketball Reference
Medals
Women's basketball
Representing the United States
FIBA Under-17 World Cup
Gold medal – first place	2010 France	Team

Imani Trishawn McGee-Stafford (born October 11, 1994) is an American professional basketball player. She played college basketball for University of Texas at Austin.

== College ==
In 2015, while at Texas, McGee-Stafford was awarded the Honda Inspiration Award which is given to a collegiate athlete "who has overcome hardship and was able to return to play at the collegiate level". She grew up in a challenging home environment, but overcame the challenge and became a voice for others.

== Texas statistics ==
Legend
GP	Games played	GS	Games started	MPG	Minutes per game
FG%	Field goal percentage	3P%	3-point field goal percentage	FT%	Free throw percentage
RPG	Rebounds per game	APG	Assists per game	SPG	Steals per game
BPG	Blocks per game	PPG	Points per game	**Bold**	Career high

Year	Team	GP	Points	FG%	3P%	FT%	RPG	APG	SPG	BPG	PPG
2012-13	Texas	30	334	48.3%	22.2%	64.4%	**9.4**	**1.0**	0.7	2.5	11.1
2013-14	Texas	33	356	49.8%	**57.1%**	62.8%	7.3	0.5	0.5	2.2	10.8
2014-15	Texas	27	266	**56.2%**	0.0%	70.0%	7.1	0.6	0.7	1.9	9.9
2015-16	Texas	**36**	**405**	50.3%	30.0%	**78.6%**	8.9	0.8	**0.8**	**2.9**	**11.3**
Career		126	1361	50.6%	32.1%	69.6%	8.2	0.7	0.7	2.4	10.8

== Professional career ==
=== WNBA ===
McGee-Stafford was drafted 10th overall by the Chicago Sky in the 2016 WNBA draft. In her rookie season, she was ranked seventh in the league in blocks per game and was named to the WNBA All-Rookie Team. In her first playoff game, she broke the WNBA playoff rookie record for blocks in a game with 6. Midway through the 2017 season, McGee-Stafford was traded to the Atlanta Dream along with teammate Tamera Young in exchange for Jordan Hooper and a first-round draft pick. She continued on with Atlanta in 2018 before joining the Dallas Wings for the 2019 season.

=== Overseas ===
In December 2016, McGee-Stafford moved to Israel to play for Bnot Hertzeliya. In 16 games during the 2016–17 season, she averaged 14.0 points, 10.8 rebounds, 1.1 assists, 1.1 steals and 2.6 blocks per game. Between November and December 2017, she played in China for Beijing Great Wall of the Women's Chinese Basketball Association. She returned to China a year later, where she played for the Liaoning Flying Eagles between October and November 2018. In February 2019, she had a four-game stint in Turkey with Adana Basketbol.

On June 13, 2019, McGee-Stafford signed with the Perth Lynx in Australia for the 2019–20 WNBL season.

== National career ==
The Puerto Rico women's national basketball team naturalized McGee-Stafford and made her national team debut in the 2026 FIBA Women's Basketball World Cup Qualifying Tournament against the Italy women's national basketball team.

== WNBA career statistics ==
Legend
GP	Games played	GS	Games started	MPG	Minutes per game	RPG	Rebounds per game
APG	Assists per game	SPG	Steals per game	BPG	Blocks per game	PPG	Points per game
TO	Turnovers per game	FG%	Field-goal percentage	3P%	3-point field-goal percentage	FT%	Free-throw percentage
**Bold**	Career best	°	League leader

=== Regular season ===
Year	Team	GP	GS	MPG	FG%	3P%	FT%	RPG	APG	SPG	BPG	TO	PPG
2016	Chicago	**31**	**16**	**18.9**	**55.4**	0.0	66.0	**5.6**	**0.6**	**0.6**	**1.3**	0.9	**6.7**
2017	Chicago	22	4	15.5	44.4	33.3	**70.6**	4.4	0.5	0.4	0.8	1.0	4.6
2017	Atlanta	10	0	9.2	54.2	0.0	50.0	2.9	0.2	0.1	0.7	**0.3**	2.9
2018	Atlanta	29	2	10.5	45.3	**46.7**	3.4	0.6	0.4	0.4	0.8	1.5	2.9
2019	Dallas	29	6	11.9	46.8	25.0	64.3	3.8	**0.6'**	**0.6**	0.6	1.2	3.9
Career	4 years, 3 teams	121	28	13.8	49.3	28.6	62.7	4.2	0.6	0.5	0.8	0.9	4.4

=== Playoffs ===
Year	Team	GP	GS	MPG	FG%	3P%	FT%	RPG	APG	SPG	BPG	TO	PPG
2016	Chicago	**5**	**5**	**20.4**	**50.0**	0.0	**60.0**	**8.2**	**0.8**	0.0	**2.0**	1.0	**8.4**
2018	Atlanta	4	0	5.8	**33.3**	0.0	50.0	2.0	0.0	0.0	0.3	**0.0**	1.3
Career	2 years, 2 teams	9	5	13.9	47.6	0.0	58.3	5.4	0.4	0.0	1.2	0.6	5.2

== Personal life ==
McGee-Stafford was married to former Texas Longhorns football player Paul Boyette Jr. in 2015, but the couple divorced in 2017. She is the daughter of former WNBA player Pamela McGee, the younger maternal half-sister of current NBA player JaVale McGee, and a cousin of NFL player Jarron Gilbert. She also appeared on Let's Make a Deal with her grandmother on March 8, 2018 and received a pair of scooters. In the spring of 2020, she announced that she is stepping away for the next two WNBA seasons to pursue a Juris Doctor degree from Southwestern Law School in Los Angeles. In March 2023, McGee-Stafford was announced as a partner in MOORvision Technologies and Ucam, a camera built to capture athlete's point of view during games.
