= 2018 Atlanta Dream season =

- Head coach: Nicki Collen
- Arena: McCamish Pavilion

Results
- Record: 23–11 (.676)
- Place: 1st (Eastern)
- Playoff finish: 2nd seed; Lost in Semifinals to Washington (2–3)

Media
- Television: Fox Sports South (FS-S), Fox Sports Southeast (FSSE)

The 2018 WNBA season was the 11th season for the Atlanta Dream of the Women's National Basketball Association. The team began its season on May 20, 2018, against the Dallas Wings.

The Dream started the season slowly, going 2–2 in May with both losses coming to Dallas. The team continued to not be able to build momentum in June, posting a 5–6 record. The team started well in the month, going on a three game win streak, but couldn't continue that run, winning just 2 of the final 7 games in the month. However, the Dream found another gear in July. The Dream went on an 8 game winning streak and head coach Nicki Collen was awarded the Coach of the Month. The team finished the month 9–2 and in prime playoff position. The team continued its run in August, going 6–1 with their only loss on the road against Phoenix. Collen was again voted coach of the month. However, on August 9, the team lost their star Angel McCoughtry for the season with torn ligaments in her left knee. The team finished a franchise–best 23–11 which entered them into the 2018 WNBA Playoffs as the second seed.

As the second seed, Atlanta earned a double bye into the semifinal round. There, Atlanta faced off against the Washington Mystics. The Mystics were the third seed, finishing one game behind Atlanta in the regular season. The series was a close one, with the Mystics star Elena Delle Donne getting injured in game 3. However, the Dream were not able to capitalize and eventually lost the series 2 games to 3.

== Transactions ==
=== WNBA draft ===
Round	Pick	Player	Nationality	School/team/country
2	15	Monique Billings	United States	UCLA
2	16	Kristy Wallace	Australia	Baylor
3	27	Mackenzie Engram	United States	Georgia

=== Trades and Roster Changes ===
Date	Transaction
January 1, 2018	Cored Angel McCoughtry
January 1, 2018	Exercised 4th-Year Team Option on Bria Holmes and Imani McGee-Stafford
January 1, 2018	Extended a Qualifying Offer to Damiris Dantas
January 16, 2018	Bria Holmes to miss season due to Pregnancy
February 1, 2018	Signed Renee Montgomery
February 1, 2018	Signed Maggie Lucas to a training-camp contract
February 2, 2018	Signed Jessica Breland
February 8, 2018	Signed Angel McCoughtry
February 13, 2018	Signed Adaora Elonu to a training-camp contract
February 14, 2018	Signed Damiris Dantas
March 9, 2018	Signed Blake Dietrick to a training-camp contract
April 3, 2018	Signed Elizabeth Williams to a Multi-Year Extension
April 5, 2018	Signed Yelena Leuchanka to a training-camp contract
April 12, 2018	Traded Bria Holmes to the Connecticut Sun in exchange for a Second Round Pick in 2018 and 2019
April 13, 2018	Signed Alexa Hart and Rosemarie Julien to training-camp contracts
April 13, 2018	Waived Yelena Leuchanka
April 18, 2018	Signed Mackenzie Engram to a rookie-scale contract
April 19, 2018	Signed Monique Billings to a rookie-scale contract
May 4, 2018	Waived Alexa Hart
May 13, 2018	Waived Rosemarie Julien
May 16, 2018	Waived Mackenzie Engram
May 17, 2018	Waived Adaora Elonu
June 30, 2018	Waived Maggie Lucas
July 4, 2018	Signed Alexis Prince to a 7-day contract
July 9, 2018	Traded Layshia Clarendon and 2nd Round Pick in the 2019 WNBA draft to the Connecticut Sun in exchange for Alex Bentley
July 11, 2018	Signed Alexis Prince to a 2nd 7-day contract
July 18, 2018	Signed Alexis Prince to a 3rd 7-day contract
July 25, 2018	Signed Alexis Prince
August 7, 2018	Signed Tiffany Hayes to a Multi-Year Extension
August 10, 2018	Signed Adaora Elonu to a 7-day contract
August 17, 2018	Signed Adaora Elonu

== Roster ==
2018 Atlanta Dream roster
Players
Coaches

Pos.	No.	Nat.	Name	Height	Weight	DOB	From	Yrs
G	20	(United States)	Bentley, Alex	5' 7" (1.7m)	152 lb (69kg)	1990-10-27	Penn State	5
F	25	(United States)	Billings, Monique	6' 4" (1.93m)	176 lb (80kg)	1996-05-02	UCLA	R
F	51	(United States)	Breland, Jessica	6' 3" (1.91m)	164 lb (74kg)	1988-02-23	North Carolina	6
C	12	(Brazil)	Dantas, Damiris	6' 3" (1.91m)	208 lb (94kg)	1992-11-17	Brazil	4
G	11	(United States)	Dietrick, Blake	5' 10" (1.78m)	157 lb (71kg)	1993-07-19	Princeton	1
F	2	(Nigeria)	Elonu, Adaora	6' 1" (1.85m)	165 lb (75kg)	1990-04-28	Texas A&M	R
G	15	(United States)	Hayes, Tiffany	5' 10" (1.78m)	155 lb (70kg)	1989-09-20	Connecticut	6
G/F	35	(United States)	McCoughtry, Angel (injured)	6' 1" (1.85m)	160 lb (73kg)	1986-07-10	Louisville	8
C	34	(United States)	McGee-Stafford, Imani	6' 7" (2.01m)	200 lb (91kg)	1994-10-11	Texas	2
G	21	(United States)	Montgomery, Renee	5' 7" (1.7m)	141 lb (64kg)	1986-12-02	Connecticut	9
G	3	(United States)	Prince, Alexis	6' 2" (1.88m)	178 lb (81kg)	1994-02-05	Baylor	1
G	7	(United States)	Sykes, Brittney	5' 9" (1.75m)	155 lb (70kg)	1994-02-07	Syracuse	1
F/C	1	(United States)	Williams, Elizabeth	6' 3" (1.91m)	199 lb (90kg)	1993-06-23	Duke	3

Head coach
(United States) Nicki Collen (Marquette)
Assistant coaches
(United States) Mike Peterson (Bushnell)
(United States) Darius Taylor (Michigan)
Athletic trainer
(United States) Jessica Cohen (Vanderbilt)
Strength and conditioning coach
(United States) Ashley Alexander (LSU New Orleans)

Legend

- (C) Team captain
- (DP) Unsigned draft pick
- (FA) Free agent
- (S) Suspended
- Injured

=== Depth ===
Pos.	Starter	Bench
C	Elizabeth Williams	Imani McGee-Stafford
PF	Jessica Breland	Damiris Dantas; Monique Billings; Adaora Elonu
SF	Angel McCoughtry	Brittney Sykes; Alexis Prince
SG	Tiffany Hayes	Alex Bentley
PG	Renee Montgomery	Blake Dietrick

== Schedule ==
=== Preseason ===
2018 Schedule: Preseason
Total: 1–1 (Home: 0–0; Road: 1–1)

Game	Date	Opponent	Score	High points	High rebounds	High assists	Location/Attendance	Record
1	May 6	@ Chicago	W 78–61	Hayes (16)	Williams (7)	Montgomery (7)	Wintrust Arena	1–0
2	May 11	vs. Connecticut	L 58–74	Clarendon (13)	Williams (6)	Montgomery (3)	Webster Bank Arena; 1,610	1–1

2018 pre-season schedule

=== Regular season ===
2018 Regular Season
Total: 23–11 (Home: 13–4; Road: 10–7)
May: 2–2 (Home: 1–1; Road: 1–1)

Game	Date	Opponent	Score	High points	High rebounds	High assists	Location/Attendance	Record
1	May 20	@ Dallas	L 78–101	3 Tied (14)	Sykes (7)	Hayes (6)	College Park Center; 5,907	0–1
2	May 23	@ Chicago	W 81–63	Hayes (22)	Breland (10)	Williams (6)	Wintrust Arena; 6,147	1–1
3	May 26	Dallas	L 80–87	McCoughtry (19)	Breland (10)	Hayes (4)	McCamish Pavilion; 4,749	1–2
4	May 29	Minnesota	W 76–74	Hayes (20)	Tied (7)	Tied (5)	McCamish Pavilion; 3,785	2–2

June: 5–6 (Home: 3–1; Road: 2–5)

Game	Date	Opponent	Score	High points	High rebounds	High assists	Location/Attendance	Record
5	June 3	Phoenix	L 71–78	McCoughtry (21)	Tied (10)	Clarendon (3)	McCamish Pavilion; 3,795	2–3
6	June 5	Connecticut	W 82–77	Hayes (22)	Breland (9)	Tied (4)	McCamish Pavilion; 2,830	3–3
7	June 8	@ Las Vegas	W 87–83	Hayes (24)	Tied (9)	McCoughtry (6)	Mandalay Bay Events Center; 5,913	4–3
8	June 10	@ Seattle	W 67–64	Hayes (23)	Breland (14)	4 Tied (2)	KeyArena; 6,345	5–3
9	June 12	@ Los Angeles	L 64–72	Hayes (16)	Breland (6)	Hayes (3)	Staples Center; 9,215	5–4
10	June 14	Indiana	W 72–67	Hayes (23)	Breland (13)	McCoughtry (4)	McCamish Pavilion; 6,561	6–4
11	June 16	@ Indiana	L 64–96	McCoughtry (19)	McCoughtry (8)	Clarendon (4)	Bankers Life Fieldhouse; 6,234	6–5
12	June 19	@ New York	L 72–79	McCoughtry (39)	McCoughtry (14)	McCoughtry (4)	Westchester County Center; 1,627	6–6
13	June 22	Connecticut	W 75–70	McCoughtry (25)	Williams (10)	Sykes (4)	McCamish Pavilion; 4,047	7–6
14	June 27	@ Chicago	L 80–93	Montgomery (19)	Breland (7)	Montgomery (5)	Wintrust Arena; 8,521	7–7
15	June 29	@ Minnesota	L 74–85	McGee-Stafford (15)	Breland (10)	Montgomery (6)	Target Center; 9,209	7–8

July: 9–2 (Home: 5–2; Road: 4–0)

Game	Date	Opponent	Score	High points	High rebounds	High assists	Location/Attendance	Record
16	July 1	@ Indiana	W 87–83	Sykes (20)	Tied (6)	Sykes (7)	Bankers Life Fieldhouse; 5,277	8–8
17	July 6	Seattle	L 86–95	McCoughtry (26)	Sykes (6)	Dantas (5)	McCamish Pavilion; 3,935	8–9
18	July 8	Phoenix	W 76–70	Hayes (18)	Breland (12)	McCoughtry (4)	McCamish Pavilion; 3,952	9–9
19	July 11	@ Washington	W 106–89	McCoughtry (26)	Breland (10)	Breland (7)	Capital One Arena; 11,354	10–9
20	July 13	Indiana	W 98–74	Hayes (16)	Breland (8)	McCoughtry (7)	McCamish Pavilion; 3,807	11–9
21	July 15	Washington	W 80–77	Sykes (17)	Breland (10)	Bentley (4)	McCamish Pavilion; 3,880	12–9
22	July 17	@ Connecticut	W 86–83	McCoughtry (24)	Breland (11)	Tied (4)	Mohegan Sun Arena; 5,555	13–9
23	July 19	New York	W 82–68	Montgomery (24)	Tied (12)	McCoughtry (6)	McCamish Pavilion; 3,074	14–9
24	July 22	Seattle	W 87–74	Williams (17)	Tied (8)	Hayes (5)	McCamish Pavilion; 4,916	15–9
25	July 24	@ Los Angeles	W 81–87	McCoughtry (19)	McCoughtry (7)	Montgomery (6)	Staples Center; 9,324	16–9
26	July 31	Washington	L 71–86	Hayes (18)	Williams (9)	Sykes (5)	McCamish Pavilion; 3,648	16–10

August: 6–1 (Home: 3–0; Road: 3–1)

Game	Date	Opponent	Score	High points	High rebounds	High assists	Location/Attendance	Record
27	August 3	Chicago	W 89–74	McCoughtry (21)	Breland (9)	Bentley (7)	McCamish Pavilion; 5,120	17–10
28	August 5	@ Minnesota	W 86–66	Hayes (28)	Tied (8)	Sykes (6)	Target Center; 9,333	18–10
29	August 7	Las Vegas	W 109–100	Tied (22)	Breland (11)	Bentley (8)	McCamish Pavilion; 4,033	19–10
30	August 9	Los Angeles	W 79–73	Breland (19)	Breland (9)	Bentley (8)	McCamish Pavilion; 4,235	20–10
31	August 11	Dallas	W 92–82	Montgomery (24)	Williams (9)	3 Tied (5)	McCamish Pavilion; 4,937	21–10
32	August 12	@ New York	W 86–77	Montgomery (30)	Tied (7)	Sykes (4)	Westchester County Center; 2,362	22–10
33	August 17	@ Phoenix	L 95–104	Bentley (24)	Williams (8)	Bentley (6)	Talking Stick Resort Arena; 11,177	22–11
34	August 19	@ Las Vegas	W 93–78	Williams (20)	Williams (7)	Montgomery (9)	Mandalay Bay Events Center; 5,737	23–11

2018 season schedule

=== Playoffs ===
2016 Playoffs: Total: 2–3 (Home: 1–2; Road: 1–1)
WNBA Semifinals vs. Washington (Lost Series 2-3)

Game	Date	Opponent	Score	High points	High rebounds	High assists	Location/Attendance	Record
1	August 26	Washington	L 84–87	Bentley (19)	Williams (14)	5 Tied (2)	McCamish Pavilion; 5,086	0–1
2	August 28	Washington	W 78–75	Bentley (22)	Breland (14)	Hayes (6)	McCamish Pavilion; 3,813	1–1
3	August 31	Washington	W 81–76	Hayes (23)	Breland (11)	Montgomery (3)	Charles Smith Center; 3,867	2–1
4	September 2	Washington	76–97	Tied (12)	Breland (8)	Montgomery (10)	Charles Smith Center; 3,722	2–2
5	September 4	Washington	81–86	Bentley (16)	Breland (12)	Hayes (4)	McCamish Pavilion; 4,435	2–3

2018 playoff schedule

== Standings ==
#	Eastern Conference	W	L	PCT	GB	Home	Road	Conf.
1	Atlanta Dream (2)	23	11	.676	–	13–4	10–7	12–4
2	Washington Mystics (3)	22	12	.647	1	12–5	10–7	12–4
3	Connecticut Sun (4)	21	13	.618	2	13–4	8–9	9–7
4	e – Chicago Sky	13	21	.382	10	7–10	6–11	6–10
5	e – New York Liberty	7	27	.206	16	4–13	3–14	6–10
6	e – Indiana Fever	6	28	.176	17	2–15	4–13	3–13

Notes

(#) – Conference Standing, Playoff Seeds shown to the right of team name
x – Clinched Playoff Berth
e – Eliminated from playoffs

== Playoffs ==
**First round** Single elimination (Aug. 21)
5	**Phoenix Mercury**	**101**
8	Dallas Wings	83
6	**Los Angeles Sparks**	**75**
7	Minnesota Lynx	68

**Second round** Single elimination (Aug. 23)
4	Connecticut Sun	86
5	**Phoenix Mercury**	**96**
3	**Washington Mystics**	**96**
6	Los Angeles Sparks	64

**Semifinals**; Best-of-5 (Aug. 26 – Sept. 4)
1	**Seattle Storm**	**3**
5	Phoenix Mercury	2
2	Atlanta Dream	2
3	**Washington Mystics**	**3**

**WNBA Finals**; Best-of-5 (Sept. 7 – Sept. 12)
1	**Seattle Storm**	**3**
3	Washington Mystics	0

Note: Teams re-seeded after second round and semi-finals.

- **Bold** – Game or series winner
- Italic – Team with home-court advantage

== Statistics ==
Legend
GP	Games played	GS	Games started	MPG	Minutes per game	RPG	Rebounds per game
APG	Assists per game	SPG	Steals per game	BPG	Blocks per game	PPG	Points per game
FG%	Field-goal percentage	3P%	3-point field-goal percentage	FT%	Free-throw percentage	TO	Turnovers per game
PF	Fouls per game		Team leader		League leader

=== Regular season ===
Player	GP	GS	MPG	FG%	3P%	FT%	RPG	APG	SPG	BPG	PPG
Tiffany Hayes	31	29	28.9	.441	.321	.817	3.6	2.7	1.2	0.2	17.2
Angel McCoughtry	29	28	27.6	.420	.276	.836	6.0	3.0	1.3	0.6	16.5
Renee Montgomery	34	34	27.5	.389	.371	.881	1.7	3.7	1.3	0.1	10.3
Brittney Sykes	29	7	20.7	.411	.268	.663	3.5	2.3	0.3	0.6	9.7
Elizabeth Williams	33	32	26.8	.548	.000	.563	5.8	1.4	0.8	1.8	9.1
Alex Bentley	16	0	20.8	.376	.310	.529	1.5	3.4	0.9	0.1	8.7
Jessica Breland	34	34	26.4	.428	.000	.750	7.9	2.0	1.1	1.9	8.3
Damiris Dantas	19	0	13.4	.433	.238	.722	2.4	0.8	0.4	0.0	5.4
Alexis Prince	2	0	3.0	.600	1.000	.000	1.0	0.0	0.0	0.0	3.5
Monique Billings	32	0	11.0	.441	.000	.750	2.8	0.4	0.4	0.0	3.3
Imani McGee-Stafford	29	2	10.5	.453	.000	.467	3.4	0.6	0.4	0.4	2.9
Blake Dietrick	26	0	7.2	.343	.391	.667	0.5	0.4	0.3	0.0	1.4
Adaora Elonu	1	0	1.0	.000	.000	.000	0.0	0.0	0.0	0.0	0.0

=== Playoffs ===
Player	GP	GS	MPG	FG%	3P%	FT%	RPG	APG	SPG	BPG	PPG
Tiffany Hayes	5	5	33.6	44.4	37.5	80.0	6.2	3.4	1.4	0.2	16.4
Alex Bentley	5	0	24.0	44.4	32.0	75.0	2.0	2.0	0.6	0.0	15.6
Brittney Sykes	5	5	27.0	47.3	41.2	50.0	3.6	1.6	0.8	0.2	12.6
Elizabeth Williams	5	5	31.4	51.1	0.0	54.5	8.8	1.0	0.6	1.2	10.8
Jessica Breland	5	5	31.0	37.0	0.0	83.3	10.8	2.8	0.8	2.8	9.0
Renee Montgomery	5	5	31.6	29.3	28.6	84.6	2.0	4.2	0.2	0.2	8.6
Monique Billings	5	0	12.8	47.4	0.0	57.9	2.6	0.8	0.0	0.6	5.8
Imani McGee-Stafford	4	0	5.8	33.3	0.0	50.0	2.0	0.0	0.0	0.3	1.3
Adaora Elonu	1	0	4.0	0.0	0.0	50.0	0.0	0.0	0.0	0.0	0.0
Blake Dietrick	3	0	5.0	0.0	0.0	0.0	1.3	0.7	0.0	0.0	0.0

== Awards and honors ==
Recipient	Award	Date awarded	Ref.
Tiffany Hayes	Eastern Conference Player of the Week	June 11, 2018	
Tiffany Hayes	Eastern Conference Player of the Week	July 23, 2018	
Tiffany Hayes	Eastern Conference Player of the Week	August 6, 2018	
Tiffany Hayes	Eastern Conference Player of the Month - July	August 1, 2018	
Angel McCoughtry	Eastern Conference Player of the Week	June 24, 2018	
Angel McCoughtry	WNBA All-Star Selection	July 17, 2018	
Jessica Breland	Eastern Conference Player of the Week	July 15, 2018	
Nicki Collen	WNBA Coach of the Month - July	August 2, 2018	
Nicki Collen	WNBA Coach of the Month - August	August 20, 2018	
Nicki Collen	WNBA Coach of the Year	August 28, 2018	
Chris Sienko	WNBA Basketball Executive of the Year	August 28, 2018	
