= Jessica Breland =

American basketball player (born 1988)

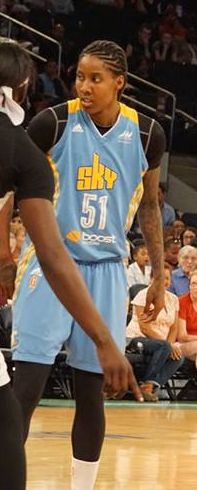
- Breland with the Chicago Sky in 2015

Personal information
- Born: February 23, 1988 (age 38) New York City, New York, U.S.
- Listed height: 6 ft 2 in (1.88 m)
- Listed weight: 166 lb (75 kg)

Career information
- High school: Bertie (Windsor, North Carolina)
- College: North Carolina (2006–2011)
- WNBA draft: 2011: 2nd round, 13th overall pick
- Drafted by: Minnesota Lynx
- Playing career: 2011–2021
- Position: Forward
- Number: 51

Career history
- 2011: New York Liberty
- 2011: Connecticut Sun
- 2013: Indiana Fever
- 2014–2017: Chicago Sky
- 2018–2019: Atlanta Dream
- 2021: Indiana Fever

Career highlights
- Honda Inspiration Award (2011); WNBA All-Star (2014); WNBA All-Defensive First Team (2018); ACC All-Defensive Team (2009); ACC Sixth Player of the Year (2008); McDonald's All-American (2006)
- Stats at WNBA.com
- Stats at Basketball Reference

Jessica Nicole Breland (born February 23, 1988) is an American former professional basketball player who played in the Women's National Basketball Association (WNBA) from 2011 to 2021.

== Early life and education ==
Born in New York City, Breland grew up in Kelford, North Carolina, and attended Bertie High School in Windsor where she was a three-sport athlete participating in volleyball and track & field and basketball. In her senior year she averaged 22 points per game and 12 rebounds for the Falcons basketball team. She was an All-American selection by McDonald's, the WBCA, and Parade Magazine, 2nd team All-American selection by EA Sports, 3rd-Team Street and Smith's All-America pick, Gatorade Player of the Year in North Carolina as a senior, and a USA U18 Women's National Team Trials Invitee.

== College career ==
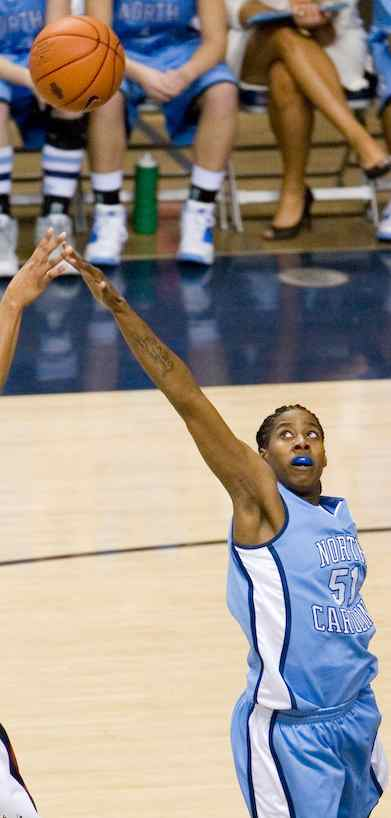
Breland with North Carolina in 2008

In 2009, when playing for the North Carolina Tar Heels, Breland was diagnosed with Hodgkin's lymphoma, a cancer of the lymph system. She underwent chemotherapy and had to sit out the 2009–10 season, but recovered. In 2011, Breland was awarded the Honda Inspiration Award which is given to a collegiate athlete "who has overcome hardship and was able to return to play at the collegiate level".

== Professional career ==
Breland was selected in the second round of the 2011 WNBA draft (13th overall) by the Minnesota Lynx. She was then traded to New York. She signed a free agent contract with the Chicago Sky in 2014.

On February 2, 2018, Breland signed a contract with the Atlanta Dream.

On February 19, 2020, Breland was traded to the Phoenix Mercury in a three-team deal.

== Career statistics ==
Legend
GP	Games played	GS	Games started	MPG	Minutes per game	RPG	Rebounds per game
APG	Assists per game	SPG	Steals per game	BPG	Blocks per game	PPG	Points per game
TO	Turnovers per game	FG%	Field-goal percentage	3P%	3-point field-goal percentage	FT%	Free-throw percentage
**Bold**	Career best	°	League leader

=== WNBA ===
==== Regular season ====
WNBA regular season statistics
Year	Team	GP	GS	MPG	FG%	3P%	FT%	RPG	APG	SPG	BPG	TO	PPG
2011	New York	9	0	7.7	38.1	—	**100.0**	1.6	0.4	0.2	0.7	0.3	2.0
2011	Connecticut	4	0	1.5	**50.0**	—	—	0.0	0.0	0.0	0.3	**0.0**	0.5
2012	Did not play (waived)												
2013	Indiana	30	2	14.6	43.9	—	74.1	4.0	0.6	0.6	1.0	1.1	5.3
2014	Chicago	32	32	**26.5**	46.1	0.0	75.9	6.8	1.9	0.9	1.8	2.2	**9.7**
2015	Chicago	33	30	21.4	47.1	—	77.4	5.9	1.3	0.7	1.1	1.0	6.7
2016	Chicago	**34**	16	17.2	49.4	—	79.5	4.4	0.7	0.5	1.1	1.1	6.0
2017	Chicago	**34**	33	24.5	47.6	**38.1**	78.7	6.3	1.6	0.6	1.7	1.8	9.5
2018	Atlanta	**34**	**34**	26.4	42.8	—	75.0	**7.9**	**2.0**	1.1	**1.9**	1.7	8.3
2019	Atlanta	33	33	23.2	37.8	23.7	87.9	7.3	1.7	**1.3**	1.1	1.2	7.5
2020	Did not play (opted out)												
2021	Indiana	26	18	20.9	37.2	31.3	68.4	6.3	**2.0**	0.6	1.5	1.8	5.8
**Career**	9 years, 5 teams	269	198	21.2	43.9	28.2	77.7	5.9	1.4	0.8	1.4	1.4	7.1
**Career**	All-Star	1	0	22.0	.333	—	—	12.0	2.0	2.0	1.0	0.0	6.0

==== Playoffs ====
WNBA playoff statistics
Year	Team	GP	GS	MPG	FG%	3P%	FT%	RPG	APG	SPG	BPG	TO	PPG
2014	Chicago	**7**	0	13.0	38.1	—	—	4.0	1.0	0.1	0.6	**0.4**	2.3
2015	Chicago	3	3	28.3	**52.0**	—	**100.0**	7.7	1.3	**1.3**	2.3	1.0	**10.0**
2016	Chicago	5	**5**	25.4	51.1	0.0	—	8.4	0.6	1.2	1.4	0.8	9.2
2018	Atlanta	5	**5**	**31.0**	37.0	0.0	83.3	**10.8**	**2.8**	0.8	**2.8**	1.6	9.0
**Career**	4 years, 2 teams	20	13	22.9	44.1	0.0	90.0	7.4	1.4	0.8	1.6	0.9	6.9

=== College ===
NCAA statistics
Year	Team	GP	Points	FG%	3P%	FT%	RPG	APG	SPG	BPG	PPG
2006-07	North Carolina	**37**	241	**54.4%**	42.9%	67.8%	4.5	0.8	0.9	1.3	6.5
2007-08	North Carolina	36	380	53.1%	15.4%	70.2%	7.1	1.2	1.1	2.1	10.6
2008-09	North Carolina	35	**493**	51.3%	**46.7%**	**76.7%**	**8.5**	**1.7**	**1.5**	**3.1**	**14.1**
2009-10	North Carolina	Redshirt									
2010-11	North Carolina	34	421	44.2%	24.0%	65.7%	7.1	1.6	1.1	1.9	12.4
**Career**		142	1535	50.0%	30.0%	70.8%	6.8	1.3	1.2	2.1	10.8
