= 2018 WNBA Finals =

Team	Coach	Wins
Seattle Storm	Dan Hughes	3
Washington Mystics	Mike Thibault	0
- Dates: September 7–12
- MVP: (United States) Breanna Stewart (Seattle Storm)
- Hall of Famers: Storm: Sue Bird (2025); Mystics: Elena Delle Donne (2026)
- Eastern finals: Washington Mystics defeated Atlanta Dream, 3–2 (Note: the semifinal rounds as of 2016 were not divided by conference)
- Western finals: Seattle Storm defeated Phoenix Mercury, 3–2

The 2018 WNBA Finals, officially the WNBA Finals 2018 presented by YouTube TV for sponsorship reasons, was the best-of-five championship series for the 2018 season of the Women's National Basketball Association (WNBA). It featured the top-seeded Seattle Storm and the three-seeded Washington Mystics. The series began on September 7, 2018, and ended on September 12, 2018. After winning the first two games at home, the Storm went on the road and completed the 3–0 series sweep. It was the franchise's first title in eight years and third overall.

== Road to the Finals ==
=== Standings ===
#	Western Conference	W	L	PCT	GB	Home	Road	Conf.
1	Seattle Storm **(1)**	26	8	.765	–	13–4	13–4	11–5
2	Phoenix Mercury **(5)**	20	14	.588	6	9–8	11–6	8–8
3	Los Angeles Sparks **(6)**	19	15	.559	7	11–6	8–9	9–7
4	Minnesota Lynx **(7)**	18	16	.529	8	9–8	9–8	9–7
5	Dallas Wings **(8)**	15	19	.441	11	10–7	5–12	7–9
6	**e** –Las Vegas Aces	14	20	.412	12	8–9	6–11	4–12

#	Eastern Conference	W	L	PCT	GB	Home	Road	Conf.
1	Atlanta Dream **(2)**	23	11	.676	–	13–4	10–7	12–4
2	Washington Mystics **(3)**	22	12	.647	1	12–5	10–7	12–4
3	Connecticut Sun **(4)**	21	13	.618	2	13–4	8–9	9–7
4	**e** – Chicago Sky	13	21	.382	10	7–10	6–11	6–10
5	**e** – New York Liberty	7	27	.206	16	4–13	3–14	6–10
6	**e** – Indiana Fever	6	28	.176	17	2–15	4–13	3–13

Notes

(#) – Conference Standing, Playoff Seeds shown to the right of team name
x – Clinched Playoff Berth
e – Eliminated from playoffs

=== Playoffs ===
**First round** Single elimination (Aug. 21)
5	**Phoenix Mercury**	**101**
8	Dallas Wings	83
6	**Los Angeles Sparks**	**75**
7	Minnesota Lynx	68

**Second round** Single elimination (Aug. 23)
4	Connecticut Sun	86
5	**Phoenix Mercury**	**96**
3	**Washington Mystics**	**96**
6	Los Angeles Sparks	64

**Semifinals**; Best-of-5 (Aug. 26 – Sept. 4)
1	**Seattle Storm**	**3**
5	Phoenix Mercury	2
2	Atlanta Dream	2
3	**Washington Mystics**	**3**

**WNBA Finals**; Best-of-5 (Sept. 7 – Sept. 12)
1	**Seattle Storm**	**3**
3	Washington Mystics	0

Note: Teams re-seeded after second round and semi-finals.

- **Bold** – Game or series winner
- Italic – Team with home-court advantage

== Summary ==
The Mystics' regular home of Capital One Arena was not available during the 2018 postseason due to renovations. The team had played its previous home playoff games at Charles Smith Center on the campus of George Washington University in Washington's Foggy Bottom neighborhood, but that venue would also be unavailable for the Finals due to scheduling issues. The team then moved its home Finals games to EagleBank Arena at George Mason University near Fairfax, Virginia.

=== Game 1 ===
In Game 1 of the WNBA Finals, Jewell Loyd came up big, leading the Storm in points and rebounds. Loyd scored 23 points on 9-of-12 shooting and regular season MVP Breanna Stewart added 20 points in a 13-point Storm win. The Storm went on a 16–4 run during the second quarter and never looked back. Seattle led by as many as 27 in the third quarter.

ESPNews

September 7
9:00 PM ET

Box Score

Washington Mystics 76, Seattle Storm 89
Scoring by quarter: 13–24, 19–24, 21–29, 23–12
Pts: Atkins (23); Rebs: Delle Donne, Hawkins (7); Asts: Cloud (5)	Pts: Loyd (23); Rebs: Clark, Howard, Loyd (5); Asts: Bird (7)
Seattle leads series, 1-0

KeyArena
Attendance: 11,486
Referees: Michael Price
Eric Brewton
Maj Forsberg
Cheryl Flores

=== Game 2 ===
Game 2 of the finals was a back and forth affair. In the first quarter, the Storm started quickly and held a 9-point lead. However, the Mystics came on strong in the second quarter and took a 4-point lead into halftime. The Storm cut the lead to 3 at the end of the third quarter and eventually prevailed in the final period. Seattle was now one win short of its third WNBA title. Since the WNBA Finals went to a best-of-five format in 2005, no team has gone down 0–2 and forced a game five.

ABC

September 9
3:30 PM ET

Box Score

Washington Mystics 73, Seattle Storm 75
Scoring by quarter: 16–25, 24–11, 21–22, 12–17
Pts: Delle Donne (17); Rebs: Sanders (5); Asts: Toliver (3)	Pts: Stewart (19); Rebs: Howard (11); Asts: Bird (4)
Seattle leads series, 2-0

KeyArena
Attendance: 14,212
Referees: Kurt Walker
Maj Forsberg
Billy Smith
Cheryl Flores

=== Game 3 ===
In Game 3, Seattle dominated the first half, particularly in the second quarter. By halftime, the Storm held a 17-point lead. Washington showed life in the third quarter, pulling to within five points, but Seattle quickly responded with an 8–0 run to reclaim control. From there, the Storm put the finishing touches on their third title as Finals MVP Breanna Stewart finished with a series-high 30 points while Sue Bird managed 10 assists. Bird became the only player to have been a member of all three of the Storm's championship teams.

ESPN2

September 12
8 PM ET

Box Score

Seattle Storm 98, Washington Mystics 82
Scoring by quarter: 20–16, 27–14, 21–23, 29–29
Pts: Stewart (30); Rebs: Howard (14); Asts: Bird (10)	Pts: Delle Donne (23); Rebs: Delle Donne (5); Asts: Toliver (5)
Seattle wins WNBA Finals, 3-0

EagleBank Arena
Attendance: 9,164
Referees: Roy Gulbeya
Brenda Pantoja
Byron Jarrett
Billy Smith

== Team rosters ==
2018 Seattle Storm roster
Players
Coaches

Pos.	No.	Nat.	Name	Height	Weight	DOB	From	Yrs
G	10	(United States)	Bird, Sue	5' 9" (1.75m)	150 lb (68kg)	1980-10-16	Connecticut	15
G	21	(United States)	Canada, Jordin	5' 6" (1.68m)		1995-08-11	UCLA	R
F	32	(United States)	Clark, Alysha	5' 11" (1.8m)	167 lb (76kg)	1987-07-07	Middle Tennessee	6
F	6	(United States)	Howard, Natasha	6' 2" (1.88m)	165 lb (75kg)	1991-09-02	Florida State	4
F/C	1	(United States)	Langhorne, Crystal	6' 2" (1.88m)	185 lb (84kg)	1986-10-27	Maryland	10
G	24	(United States)	Loyd, Jewell	5' 10" (1.78m)	148 lb (67kg)	1993-10-05	Notre Dame	3
F	23	(United States)	Mosqueda-Lewis, Kaleena	5' 11" (1.8m)	180 lb (82kg)	1993-11-03	Connecticut	3
C	3	(United States)	Paris, Courtney	6' 4" (1.93m)	250 lb (113kg)	1987-97-21	Oklahoma	8
G	45	(United States)	Quinn, Noelle	6' 0" (1.83m)	178 lb (81kg)	1985-01-03	UCLA	11
G	2	(United States)	Russell, Mercedes	6' 6" (1.98m)		1995-07-27	Tennessee	R
F	30	(United States)	Stewart, Breanna	6' 4" (1.93m)	170 lb (77kg)	1994-08-27	Connecticut	2
G/F	33	(Australia)	Whitcomb, Sami	5' 10" (1.78m)	145 lb (66kg)	1988-07-20	Washington	1

Head coach
(United States) Dan Hughes (Muskingum)
Assistant coaches
(United States) Gary Kloppenburg (UC San Diego)
(United States) Crystal Robinson (SE Oklahoma State)
Athletic trainer
(United States) Tom Spencer (Central Washington)

Legend

- (C) Team captain
- (DP) Unsigned draft pick
- (FA) Free agent
- (S) Suspended
- Injured

2018 Washington Mystics roster
Players
Coaches

Pos.	No.	Nat.	Name	Height	Weight	DOB	From	Yrs
G	7	(United States)	Atkins, Ariel	5' 11" (1.8m)	160 lb (73kg)	1996-07-30	Texas	R
G	15	(United States)	Cloud, Natasha	6' 0" (1.83m)	160 lb (73kg)	1992-02-22	Saint Joseph's	3
F	25	(United States)	Currie, Monique	6' 0" (1.83m)	175 lb (79kg)	1983-02-25	Duke	12
G/F	11	(United States)	Delle Donne, Elena	6' 5" (1.96m)	187 lb (85kg)	1989-09-05	Delaware	5
F	21	(United States)	Hawkins, Tianna	6' 3" (1.91m)	193 lb (88kg)	1991-03-02	Maryland	4
F	2	(United States)	Hines-Allen, Myisha	6' 2" (1.88m)	200 lb (91kg)	1996-05-30	Louisville	R
G/F	23	(United States)	Powers, Aerial	6' 0" (1.83m)	157 lb (71kg)	1994-07-17	Michigan State	2
G	14	(United States)	Ruffin-Pratt, Tierra	5' 11" (1.8m)	180 lb (82kg)	1991-04-11	North Carolina	5
F/C	30	(United States)	Sanders, LaToya	6' 3" (1.91m)	170 lb (77kg)	1986-09-11	North Carolina	5
C	34	(United States)	Thomas, Krystal	6' 5" (1.96m)	210 lb (95kg)	1989-06-10	Duke	6
G	20	(United States)	Toliver, Kristi	5' 7" (1.7m)	130 lb (59kg)	1987-01-27	Maryland	9
G	32	(United States)	Walker-Kimbrough, Shatori	5' 11" (1.8m)	142 lb (64kg)	1995-05-18	Maryland	1

Head coach
(United States) Mike Thibault (Saint Martin's)
Assistant coaches
(United States) Marianne Stanley (Immaculata)
(United States) Eric Thibault (Missouri)
Athletic trainer
(United States) Chalisa Fonza (Western Illinois)

Legend

- (C) Team captain
- (DP) Unsigned draft pick
- (FA) Free agent
- (S) Suspended
- Injured
