= 2018 Minnesota Lynx season =

- Head coach: Cheryl Reeve
- Arena: Target Center

Results
- Record: 18–16 (.529)
- Place: 4th (Western)
- Playoff finish: 7th seed, lost in the First Round to Los Angeles 68–75

Media
- Television: Fox Sports North, ESPN, NBATV

The 2018 Minnesota Lynx season was the 20th season for the Minnesota Lynx of the Women's National Basketball Association, and the 9th season under head coach Cheryl Reeve.

The Lynx finished last season with a record of 27–7, finishing first in the Western Conference (and the league as a whole) and qualifying for the playoffs, before ultimately beating Los Angeles in the WNBA Finals to win their league-tying best fourth championship.

The Lynx returned to the home arena, Target Center, for the 2018 season, following a year playing at the Xcel Energy Center and Williams Arena due to renovations.

The season started out shakily for the Lynx, going 2–3 in May. The Lynx lost their season opener in a re-match of last years finals to Los Angeles. They also lost on the road to the eventual #2 and #3 playoff seeds, Atlanta and Washington. However, the Lynx turned it around in June, posting a 7–3 record. This included a 6-game winning streak, which included wins over 4 eventual playoff teams. Momentum slowed in July, with the Lynx going 6–4. Three of their four losses in July came versus teams that ended up missing the playoffs. The Lynx finished the season on a cold note, going 3–6 in August. A two-game winning streak separated two three game losing streaks. However, the team won their last game of the season to secure the 7th seed in the playoffs.

The Lynx first-round playoff matchup saw them play in Los Angeles versus the Los Angeles Sparks. This match-up was a re-match of the past 3 WNBA Finals. The Lynx lost the game 68–75.

== Transactions ==
=== WNBA draft ===
Round	Pick	Player	Nationality	School/Team/Country
2	17	Park Ji-su	South Korea	Cheongju KB Stars (South Korea)
2	24	Kahlia Lawrence	United States	Mercer
3	36	Carlie Wagner	United States	Minnesota

==== WNBA Draft Trades ====
The Lynx traded the drafts rights to Park Si-Ju and Kahlia Lawrence to the Las Vegas Aces in exchange for the draft rights to Jill Barta and the rights to the Aces's 2nd Round Pick in the 2019 Draft.

=== Trades and Roster Changes ===
Date	Trade
February 1, 2018	Re-Signed F Rebekkah Brunson
February 7, 2018	Traded F Natasha Howard to the Seattle Storm for a 2018 2nd Round Pick and the ability to swap 2019 1st Round Picks
February 7, 2018	Re-Signed F Cecilia Zandalasini and Signed F Lynetta Kizer and F Endy Miyem
February 28, 2018	Signed F Breanna Richardson
March 6, 2018	Acquired G Danielle Robinson via trade from the Phoenix Mercury and a 2nd Round Pick in 2019 in exchange for the 12th Pick in the 2018 WNBA Draft
March 13, 2018	Signed G Tanisha Wright
April 17, 2018	Signed 3rd Round Picks F Jill Barta and G Carlie Wagner, F G'mrice Davis, F Camille Zimmerman, and C Vionise Pierre-Louis
May 4, 2018	Waived F G'mrice Davis
May 5, 2018	Signed F Jillian Alleyne
May 9, 2018	Waived F Jill Barta, F Breanna Richardson, and C Vionise Pierre-Louis
May 15, 2018	Waived F Jillian Alleyne and G Carlie Wagner
May 17, 2018	Waived F Endy Miyem
June 6, 2018	Re-signed F Endy Miyem
June 30, 2018	Waived F Lynetta Kizer
July 5, 2018	Signed F Lynetta Kizer to a 7-Day Contract
July 12, 2018	Signed F Erlana Larkins to a 7-Day Contract
July 19, 2018	Signed F Erlana Larkins to a 2nd 7-Day Contract
July 30, 2018	Signed F Erlana Larkins to Rest-Of-Season Contract
August 13, 2018	Waived F Endy Miyem
August 14, 2018	Signed G Sydney Colson to Rest-Of-Season Contract

=== Additions ===
Player	Date	Former Team
Lynetta Kizer	February 7, 2018	Connecticut Sun
Danielle Robinson	March 6, 2018	Phoenix Mercury
Tanisha Wright	March 13, 2018	New York Liberty
Endy Miyem	June 6, 2018	PF Schio (Italy)

=== Subtractions ===
Player	Date	New Team
Plenette Pierson	August 21, 2017	Retired
Renee Montgomery	February 1, 2018	Atlanta Dream
Jia Perkins	February 1, 2018	Retired
Natasha Howard	February 7, 2018	Seattle Storm

== Roster ==
2018 Minnesota Lynx roster
Players
Coaches

Pos.	No.	Nat.	Name	Height	Weight	DOB	From	Yrs
G	33	(United States)	Augustus, Seimone	6' 0" (1.83m)	172 lb (78kg)	1984-04-30	LSU	12
F	32	(United States)	Brunson, Rebekkah	6' 2" (1.88m)	181 lb (82kg)	1981-12-11	Georgetown	14
G	51	(United States)	Colson, Sydney	5' 8" (1.73m)	140 lb (64kg)	1989-08-06	Texas A&M	4
F	14	(United Kingdom)	Fagbenle, Temi	6' 4" (1.93m)	180 lb (82kg)	1992-09-08	USC	1
C	34	(United States)	Fowles, Sylvia	6' 6" (1.98m)	220 lb (100kg)	1985-10-06	LSU	10
G	12	(United States)	Jones, Alexis	5' 9" (1.75m)	166 lb (75kg)	1994-05-08	Baylor	1
F	2	(United States)	Larkins, Erlana	6' 2" (1.88m)	200 lb (91kg)	1986-04-02	North Carolina	8
F	23	(United States)	Moore, Maya	6' 0" (1.83m)	175 lb (79kg)	1989-06-11	Connecticut	7
G	3	(United States)	Robinson, Danielle	5' 9" (1.75m)	128 lb (58kg)	1989-05-10	Oklahoma	6
G	13	(United States)	Whalen, Lindsay	5' 9" (1.75m)	170 lb (77kg)	1982-05-09	Minnesota	14
G	30	(United States)	Wright, Tanisha	5' 11" (1.8m)	166 lb (75kg)	1983-11-29	Penn State	12
F	9	(Italy)	Zandalasini, Cecilia	6' 2" (1.88m)	175 lb (79kg)	1996-03-16	Italy	1

Head coach
(United States) Cheryl Reeve (La Salle)
Assistant coaches
(United States) Shelley Patterson (Washington State)
(United States) James Wade (Kennesaw State)
(United States) Walt Hopkins (Nevada)
Athletic trainer
(United States) Chuck Barta (UW–La Crosse)
Assistant trainer
(United States) Kate Taber (Iowa)

Legend

- (C) Team captain
- (DP) Unsigned draft pick
- (FA) Free agent
- (S) Suspended
- Injured

== Schedule ==
=== Preseason ===
2018 pre-season game log
Total: 1–1 (Home: 1–0; Road: 0–1)
May: 1–1 (Home: 1–0; Road: 0–1)

Game	Date	Team	Score	High points	High rebounds	High assists	Location Attendance	Record
1	May 6	vs. Washington	L 85–90	Danielle Robinson (18)	Lynetta Kizer (6)	Tanisha Wright (4)	Wells Fargo Arena; 4,203	0–1
2	May 12	Chicago	W 87–58	Sylvia Fowles (17)	Sylvia Fowles (9)	Maya Moore; Danielle Robinson (5)	Target Center; 5,024	1–1

2018 season schedule

=== Regular season ===
2018 game log
Total: 18–16 (Home: 9–8; Road: 9–8)
May: 2–3 (Home: 1–1; Road: 1–2)

Game	Date	Team	Score	High points	High rebounds	High assists	Location Attendance	Record
1	May 20	Los Angeles	L 76–77	Lindsay Whalen (17)	Sylvia Fowles (12)	Lindsay Whalen (9)	Target Center; 13,032	0–1
2	May 23	Dallas	W 76–68	Sylvia Fowles (23)	Sylvia Fowles (20)	Lindsay Whalen (8)	Target Center; 7,834	1–1
3	May 25	@ New York	W 78–72	Seimone Augustus (21)	Sylvia Fowles (11)	Danielle Robinson (5)	Westchester County Center; 2,315	2–1
4	May 27	@ Washington	L 78–90	Maya Moore (18)	Sylvia Fowles (8)	Tied (4)	Capital One Arena; 5,723	2–2
5	May 29	@ Atlanta	L 74–76	Maya Moore (18)	Sylvia Fowles (13)	Danielle Robinson (6)	McCamish Pavilion; 3,785	2–3

June: 7–3 (Home: 4–1; Road: 3–2)

Game	Date	Team	Score	High points	High rebounds	High assists	Location Attendance	Record
6	June 1	Phoenix	L 85–95	Maya Moore (25)	Sylvia Fowles (11)	Tanisha Wright (4)	Target Center; 8,830	2–4
7	June 3	@ Los Angeles	L 69–77	Maya Moore (18)	Sylvia Fowles (8)	Sylvia Fowles (5)	Staples Center; 13,500	2–5
8	June 7	@ Washington	W 88–80	Sylvia Fowles (21)	Sylvia Fowles (12)	Danielle Robinson (5)	Capital One Arena; 8,587	3–5
9	June 9	@ Connecticut	L 75–89	Sylvia Fowles (20)	Sylvia Fowles (14)	Alexis Jones (4)	Mohegan Sun Arena; 6,771	3–6
10	June 16	New York	W 85–71	Sylvia Fowles (25)	Sylvia Fowles (9)	Danielle Robinson (8)	Target Center; 9,114	4–6
11	June 19	Dallas	W 91–83	Maya Moore (21)	Sylvia Fowles (17)	Maya Moore (7)	Target Center; 8,023	5–6
12	June 22	@ Phoenix	W 83–72	Maya Moore (23)	Rebekkah Brunson (11)	Maya Moore (5)	Talking Stick Resort Arena; 11,349	6–6
13	June 24	@ Las Vegas	W 88–73	Maya Moore (23)	Sylvia Fowles (10)	Lindsay Whalen (9)	Mandalay Bay Arena; 4,814	7–6
14	June 26	Seattle	W 91–79	Maya Moore (32)	Sylvia Fowles (17)	Rebekkah Brunson (6)	Target Center; 8,634	8–6
15	June 29	Atlanta	W 85–74	Maya Moore (24)	Sylvia Fowles (15)	Lindsay Whalen (7)	Target Center; 9,209	9–6

July: 6–4 (Home: 3–3; Road: 3–1)

Game	Date	Team	Score	High points	High rebounds	High assists	Location Attendance	Record
16	July 1	@ Dallas	W 76–72	Maya Moore (26)	Sylvia Fowles (9)	Lindsay Whalen (6)	College Park Center; 4,448	10–6
17	July 3	Indiana	L 59–71	Rebekkah Brunson (13)	Rebekkah Brunson (12)	Rebekkah Brunson (6)	Target Center; 8,632	10–7
18	July 5	Los Angeles	W 83–72	Sylvia Fowles (27)	Rebekkah Brunson (12)	Sylvia Fowles (7)	Target Center; 9,303	11–7
19	July 7	@ Chicago	L 63–77	Maya Moore (16)	Sylvia Fowles (13)	Danielle Robinson (5)	Wintrust Arena; 6,139	11–8
20	July 11	@ Indiana	W 87–65	Sylvia Fowles (20)	Sylvia Fowles (10)	Sylvia Fowles (7)	Bankers Life Fieldhouse; 10,006	12–8
21	July 13	Las Vegas	L 77–85	Lindsay Whalen (22)	Sylvia Fowles (17)	Tied (5)	Target Center; 9,813	12–9
22	July 15	Connecticut	L 64–83	Sylvia Fowles (12)	Sylvia Fowles (8)	Temi Fagbenle (4)	Target Center; 9,234	12–10
23	July 18	Indiana	W 89–65	Sylvia Fowles (30)	Sylvia Fowles (16)	Erlana Larkins (8)	Target Center; 17,933	13–10
24	July 21	@ Phoenix	W 80–75	Maya Moore (38)	Rebekkah Brunson (11)	Danielle Robinson (3)	Talking Stick Resort Arena; 11,473	14–10
25	July 24	New York	W 85–82	Sylvia Fowles (27)	Sylvia Fowles (11)	Seimone Augustus (5)	Target Center; 9,830	15–10

August: 3–6 (Home: 1–3; Road: 2–3)

Game	Date	Team	Score	High points	High rebounds	High assists	Location Attendance	Record
26	August 2	@ Los Angeles	L 57–79	Sylvia Fowles (14)	Sylvia Fowles (8)	Danielle Robinson (6)	Staples Center; 9,542	15–11
27	August 3	@ Seattle	L 75–85	Sylvia Fowles (20)	Sylvia Fowles (16)	Rebekkah Brunson (5)	KeyArena; 12,064	15–12
28	August 5	Atlanta	L 66–86	Sylvia Fowles (17)	Sylvia Fowles (10)	Maya Moore (4)	Target Center; 9.333	15–13
29	August 7	@ Chicago	W 85–64	Maya Moore (31)	Sylvia Fowles (11)	Danielle Robinson (11)	Wintrust Arena; 6,388	16–13
30	August 9	@ Las Vegas	W 89–73	Maya Moore (34)	Sylvia Fowles (19)	Tanisha Wright (6)	Mandalay Bay Arena; 4,497	17–13
31	August 12	Seattle	L 72–81	Sylvia Fowles (28)	Sylvia Fowles (13)	Seimone Augustus (6)	Target Center; 9,123	17–14
32	August 14	Chicago	L 88–91	Maya Moore (21)	Sylvia Fowles (13)	Tanisha Wright (6)	Target Center; 9,730	17–15
33	August 17	@ Connecticut	L 79–96	Sylvia Fowles (25)	Sylvia Fowles (8)	Maya Moore (8)	Mohegan Sun Arena; 7,089	17–16
34	August 19	Washington	W 88–83	Sylvia Fowles (26)	Sylvia Fowles (14)	Lindsay Whalen (6)	Target Center; 13,013	18–16

2018 season schedule

=== Playoffs ===
2018 playoff game log
Total: 0–0 (Home: 0–0; Road: 0–0)
WNBA First Round: 0–1 (Home: 0–0; Road: 0–1)

Game	Date	Team	Score	High points	High rebounds	High assists	Location Attendance	Series
1	August 21	@ Los Angeles	L 68–75	Sylvia Fowles (18)	Sylvia Fowles (12)	Lindsay Whalen (5)	Staples Center; 8,598	0–1

2018 playoff schedule

== Standings ==
#	Western Conference	W	L	PCT	GB	Home	Road	Conf.
1	Seattle Storm (1)	26	8	.765	–	13–4	13–4	11–5
2	Phoenix Mercury (5)	20	14	.588	6	9–8	11–6	8–8
3	Los Angeles Sparks (6)	19	15	.559	7	11–6	8–9	9–7
4	Minnesota Lynx (7)	18	16	.529	8	9–8	9–8	9–7
5	Dallas Wings (8)	15	19	.441	11	10–7	5–12	7–9
6	e –Las Vegas Aces	14	20	.412	12	8–9	6–11	4–12

Notes

(#) – Conference Standing, Playoff Seeds shown to the right of team name
x – Qualified for playoffs
e – Eliminated from playoffs

== Playoffs ==
**First round** Single elimination (Aug. 21)
5	**Phoenix Mercury**	**101**
8	Dallas Wings	83
6	**Los Angeles Sparks**	**75**
7	Minnesota Lynx	68

**Second round** Single elimination (Aug. 23)
4	Connecticut Sun	86
5	**Phoenix Mercury**	**96**
3	**Washington Mystics**	**96**
6	Los Angeles Sparks	64

**Semifinals**; Best-of-5 (Aug. 26 – Sept. 4)
1	**Seattle Storm**	**3**
5	Phoenix Mercury	2
2	Atlanta Dream	2
3	**Washington Mystics**	**3**

**WNBA Finals**; Best-of-5 (Sept. 7 – Sept. 12)
1	**Seattle Storm**	**3**
3	Washington Mystics	0

Note: Teams re-seeded after second round and semi-finals.

- **Bold** – Game or series winner
- Italic – Team with home-court advantage

== Statistics ==
Legend
GP	Games played	GS	Games started	MPG	Minutes per game	RPG	Rebounds per game
APG	Assists per game	SPG	Steals per game	BPG	Blocks per game	PPG	Points per game
FG%	Field-goal percentage	3P%	3-point field-goal percentage	FT%	Free-throw percentage	TO	Turnovers per game
PF	Fouls per game		Team leader		League leader

=== Regular season ===
Player	GP	GS	MPG	FG%	3P%	FT%	PPG	RPG	APG	SPG	BPG
Maya Moore	34	34	31.8	.423	.365	.833	18.0	5.4	2.6	1.7	0.4
Sylvia Fowles	34	34	32.0	.619	.000	.757	17.7	11.9	2.2	1.4	1.2
Seimone Augustus	33	33	26.2	.467	.318	.706	10.8	1.8	2.6	0.4	0.2
Rebekkah Brunson	25	25	27.6	.405	.375	.673	7.2	6.8	2.4	0.8	0.5
Danielle Robinson	28	2	18.6	.445	.158	.854	6.5	1.8	3.3	0.9	0.0
Lindsay Whalen	32	29	19.3	.363	.357	.881	5.7	2.6	3.1	0.7	0.1
Cecilia Zandalasini	29	6	16.5	.409	.383	.840	5.7	1.9	1.1	0.3	0.0
Tanisha Wright	33	4	17.8	.383	.396	.741	4.3	1.6	2.0	0.5	0.1
Sydney Colson	2	0	8.5	.429	.000	.500	3.5	1.0	2.0	0.0	0.5
Alexis Jones	26	0	8.8	.352	.320	.750	3.3	0.9	0.7	0.1	0.1
Temi Fagbenle	30	2	9.4	.506	.000	.696	3.1	2.0	0.6	0.3	0.3
Erlana Larkins	13	0	12.9	.444	.000	1.00	2.1	2.7	1.3	0.7	0.2

== Awards and Milestones ==
Recipient	Award/Milestone	Date Awarded
Maya Moore	WNBA Western Conference Player of the Week	June 24, 2018
Maya Moore	WNBA Western Conference Player of the Week	July 2, 2018
Rebekkah Brunson	WNBA's All-Time Leading Rebounder (3,318)	July 5, 2018
Cheryl Reeve	WNBA's Winningest Female Head Coach (206)	July 5, 2018
Maya Moore	WNBA Cares Community Assist Award - June	July 12, 2018
Seimone Augustus	WNBA All-Star Selection	July 17, 2018
Maya Moore	WNBA All-Star Selection	July 17, 2018
Sylvia Fowles	WNBA All-Star Selection	July 17, 2018
Maya Moore	Best WNBA Player - ESPY's	July 19, 2018
Rebekkah Brunson	WNBA All-Star Selection Replacement	July 25, 2018
Maya Moore	WNBA Western Conference Player of the Week	August 13, 2018
Sylvia Fowles	WNBA Peak Performer – Rebounds	August 19, 2018

== Top 20 Players ==
With the Lynx entering their 20th season in the league, the organization began ranking their Top 20 Players of All-Time.

1. Maya Moore
2. Seimone Augustus
3. Lindsay Whalen
4. Sylvia Fowles
5. Rebekkah Brunson
6. Katie Smith
7. Svetlana Abrosimova
8. Tamika Williams
9. Teresa Edwards
10. Taj McWilliams-Franklin
11. Betty Lennox
12. Janel McCarville
13. Renee Montgomery
14. Nicole Ohlde
15. Monica Wright
16. Tonya Edwards
17. Kristen Mann
18. Charde Houston
19. Nicky Anosike
20. Devereaux Peters
