= Alex Bentley =

American basketball player (born 1990)

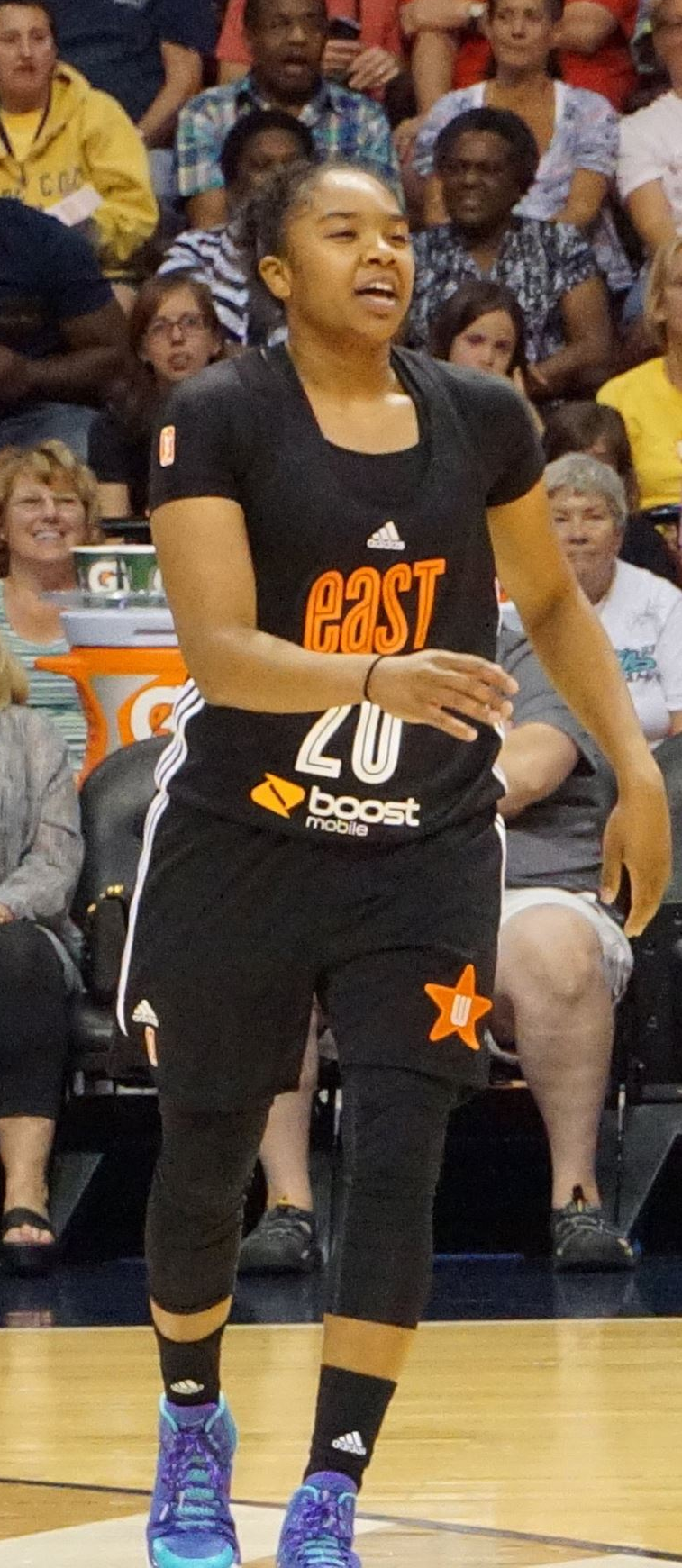

Free agent
- Position: Point guard / shooting guard
- League: WNBA

Personal information
- Born: October 27, 1990 (age 36) Indianapolis, Indiana, U.S.
- Listed height: 5 ft 8 in (1.73 m)
- Listed weight: 152 lb (69 kg)

Career information
- High school: Ben Davis (Indianapolis, Indiana)
- College: Penn State (2009–2013)
- WNBA draft: 2013: 2nd round, 13th overall pick
- Drafted by: Atlanta Dream
- Playing career: 2013–present

Career history
- 2013: Atlanta Dream
- 2014–2018: Connecticut Sun
- 2014–2015: Tarbes Gespe Bigorre
- 2015–2016: Yakin Dogu
- 2016–2017: Adana ASKİ SK
- 2017–2018: Nadezhda Orenburg
- 2018–2019: Atlanta Dream

Career highlights
- WNBA All-Star (2015); WNBA All-Rookie Team (2013); Frances Pomeroy Naismith Award (2013); Big Ten All-Defensive Team (2013); 3× First-team All-Big Ten (2011–2013); Big-Ten All-Freshman Team (2010)
- Stats at WNBA.com
- Stats at Basketball Reference

Alexandria Marie Bentley (born October 27, 1990) is an American professional basketball player. She played college basketball at Pennsylvania State University. She represents the Belarus national team internationally.

== Early life ==
She was born and raised in Indianapolis, Indiana. Her parents are Jeff and Marie Wilson; she has one brother, Jeff Wilson III and one sister, Alana Bentley. Her biological father is Albert Bentley, a former NFL player for the Indianapolis Colts (1985 to 1991). She attended Indiana Fever games as a young girl, and later worked as an intern for the team. During high school, she helped her team earn a 30–0 record, a state championship, and a No. 1 ranking in the USA Today Super 25 poll. She averaged 15.7 points, 2.6 assists, 2.2 steals, and 3.2 rebounds in her senior year at Ben Davis High School Bentley was also named a Third Team Parade Magazine High School All-American.

In the 2011–12 season, she received an All-Big Ten first team selection for the second time in her career, making her one of the nine players in school history with multiple first team accolades.

== College career ==
While at Penn State, Bentley led the Big Ten in steals. Bentley majored in broadcast journalism and minored in sociology while at Penn State. She was the fourth player in Big Ten History and the second player in school history with 1,500 points, 500 assists, and 300 steals. During the 2010–11 season Alex Bentley became the eleventh Lady Lion in school history to earn a first team all big ten selection from the coaches. In Bentley's first Big Ten game against Nebraska during the 2011–2012 season she got a then career-high 8 steals. That was the most steals a Lady Lion had acquired in approximately ten years.

During the 2010–11 season Bentley became the eleventh Lady Lion in school history to earn a first team all big ten selection from the coaches. She finished in the top fifteen of the big ten in scoring, assists, field goal percentage, free throw percentage, steals, and assist-to-turnover ratio.

=== Penn State statistics ===
Legend
| GP | Games played | GS | Games started | MPG | Minutes per game |
| FG% | Field goal percentage | 3P% | 3-point field goal percentage | FT% | Free throw percentage |
| RPG | Rebounds per game | APG | Assists per game | SPG | Steals per game |
| BPG | Blocks per game | PPG | Points per game | **Bold** | Career high |

| Year | Team | GP | Points | FG% | 3P% | FT% | RPG | APG | SPG | BPG | PPG |
|---|---|---|---|---|---|---|---|---|---|---|---|
| 2009-10 | Penn State University | 31 | 365 | 44.5% | 31.3% | 60.0% | 2.7 | 4.0 | 1.6 | 0.3 | 11.8 |
| 2010-11 | Penn State University | 35 | **505** | **44.6%** | **34.9%** | 79.8% | 2.7 | **5.0** | 2.0 | **0.3** | **14.4** |
| 2011-12 | Penn State University | 33 | 465 | 42.3% | 30.2% | 68.4% | 2.7 | 4.7 | 3.0 | 0.2 | 14.1 |
| 2012-13 | Penn State University | 32 | 451 | 40.9% | 28.1% | **81.5%** | **3.4** | 3.5 | **3.4** | 0.3 | 14.1 |
| Career | | 131 | 1786 | 43.0% | 30.9% | 73.5% | 2.9 | 4.3 | 2.5 | 0.3 | 13.6 |

== Professional career ==
=== WNBA ===
Bentley was selected with the 13th overall pick in the second round of the 2013 WNBA draft by the Atlanta Dream. In her rookie regular season she played in 34 games and started 10 of them. She averaged 22 minutes, 1.4 rebounds, 2.8 assist, and 8.3 points per game in her first regular season as a reserve for the Dream. The Dream were second in the Eastern Conference and advanced all the way to the 2013 WNBA Finals but were swept by the Minnesota Lynx. Bentley averaged 17.5 minutes, 5.8 points, 2.0 assists and 1.8 rebounds per game in her rookie postseason. In 2014, Bentley was acquired by the Connecticut Sun in a three-team trade, which sent Matee Ajavon and the Washington Mystics' 2014 second-round draft pick to the Dream, as well as Kara Lawson and the Dream's 2014 third-round draft pick to the Mystics. In her first season with the Sun, Bentley became the team's starting point guard. She finished the season averaging 12.2 points per game and a career-high 3.7 assists per game.

In 2015, Bentley was moved to the shooting guard position in the Sun's starting lineup with the arrival of Jasmine Thomas. During the 2015 season, Bentley was voted into the 2015 WNBA All-Star Game, making it her first all-star appearance, and averaged a career-high 14.7 points per game by the end of the season. Also during the season, she scored a career-high 31 points in a win against the Washington Mystics. In 2016, Bentley started in all 34 games for the first time in her career, averaging 12.9 points per game. In a triple overtime loss to the Washington Mystics, Bentley tied her career-high of 31 points in 48 minutes of play.

In 2017, Bentley re-signed with the Sun in free agency once her rookie contract expired. During the 2017 season, Bentley played mostly from the bench, starting in 9 of 31 games and averaging 8.4 ppg.

In 2018, Bentley was traded to the Atlanta Dream in July. After a season with Atlanta, she signed to the Las Vegas Aces but was waived before the season began.

=== Overseas ===
In the 2014-15 WNBA off-season, Bentley played in France for Tarbes Gespe Bigorre. In the 2015-16 WNBA off-season, Bentley played in Turkey for Yakin Dogu. In September 2016, Bentley signed with Adana ASKI SK of the Turkish League for the 2016-17 WNBA off-season. In 2017, Bentley signed with Nadezhda Orenburg of the Russian League for the 2017-18 WNBA off-season.

== WNBA statistics ==
Legend
| GP | Games played | GS | Games started | MPG | Minutes per game | RPG | Rebounds per game |
| APG | Assists per game | SPG | Steals per game | BPG | Blocks per game | PPG | Points per game |
| TO | Turnovers per game | FG% | Field-goal percentage | 3P% | 3-point field-goal percentage | FT% | Free-throw percentage |
| **Bold** | Career best | ° | League leader |

=== Regular season ===
| Year | Team | GP | GS | MPG | FG% | 3P% | FT% | RPG | APG | SPG | BPG | TO | PPG |
|---|---|---|---|---|---|---|---|---|---|---|---|---|---|
| 2013 | Atlanta | **34** | 10 | 22.1 | .398 | .329 | .711 | 1.4 | 2.8 | 1.0 | 0.0 | 1.1 | 8.3 |
| 2014 | Connecticut | **34** | 30 | 25.6 | **.433** | .323 | .755 | 1.7 | **3.7** | 1.2 | 0.0 | 2.0 | 12.2 |
| 2015 | Connecticut | 25 | 25 | **30.0** | .409 | **.336** | .830 | **2.0** | 2.0 | **2.0** | 0.2 | 1.1 | **14.7** |
| 2016 | Connecticut | **34** | **34** | 28.8 | .385 | .286 | .785 | 1.9 | 2.5 | 0.8 | 0.0 | 1.4 | 12.9 |
| 2017 | Connecticut | 31 | 9 | 23.7 | .380 | .278 | .809 | 1.9 | 2.9 | 0.8 | 0.1 | **0.9** | 8.4 |
| 2018 | Connecticut | 19 | 0 | 21.7 | .396 | .304 | .833 | 1.4 | 3.2 | 1.3 | 0.1 | 1.6 | 10.0 |
| 2018 | Atlanta | 16 | 0 | 20.8 | .376 | .310 | .529 | 1.5 | 3.4 | 0.9 | 0.1 | 1.6 | 8.7 |
| 2019 | Atlanta | 29 | 4 | 21.9 | .307 | .235 | **.857** | 1.9 | 3.0 | 0.7 | **0.3** | 1.5 | 9.0 |
| Career | 7 years, 2 teamS | 222 | 112 | 24.6 | .387 | .296 | .781 | 1.7 | 2.9 | 1.1 | 0.1 | 1.4 | 10.6 |

=== Playoffs ===
| Year | Team | GP | GS | MPG | FG% | 3P% | FT% | RPG | APG | SPG | BPG | TO | PPG |
|---|---|---|---|---|---|---|---|---|---|---|---|---|---|
| 2013 | Atlanta | **8** | 0 | 17.6 | .279 | .190 | **.889** | 1.8 | 2.0 | **1.1** | **0.3** | 0.8 | 5.8 |
| 2017 | Connecticut | 1 | 0 | **24.0** | **.500** | .000 | .500 | 1.0 | 2.0 | 1.0 | 0.0 | **0.0** | 5.0 |
| 2018 | Atlanta | 5 | 0 | **24.0** | .444 | **.320** | .750 | **2.0** | 2.0 | 0.6 | 0.0 | 2.8 | **15.6** |
| Career | 3 years, 2 teams | 14 | 0 | 20.2 | .375 | .255 | .789 | 1.8 | 2.0 | 0.9 | 0.1 | 1.6 | 9.2 |

== Awards and honors ==
- 2013—Frances Pomeroy Naismith Award
