= Natasha Cloud =

American basketball player (born 1992)

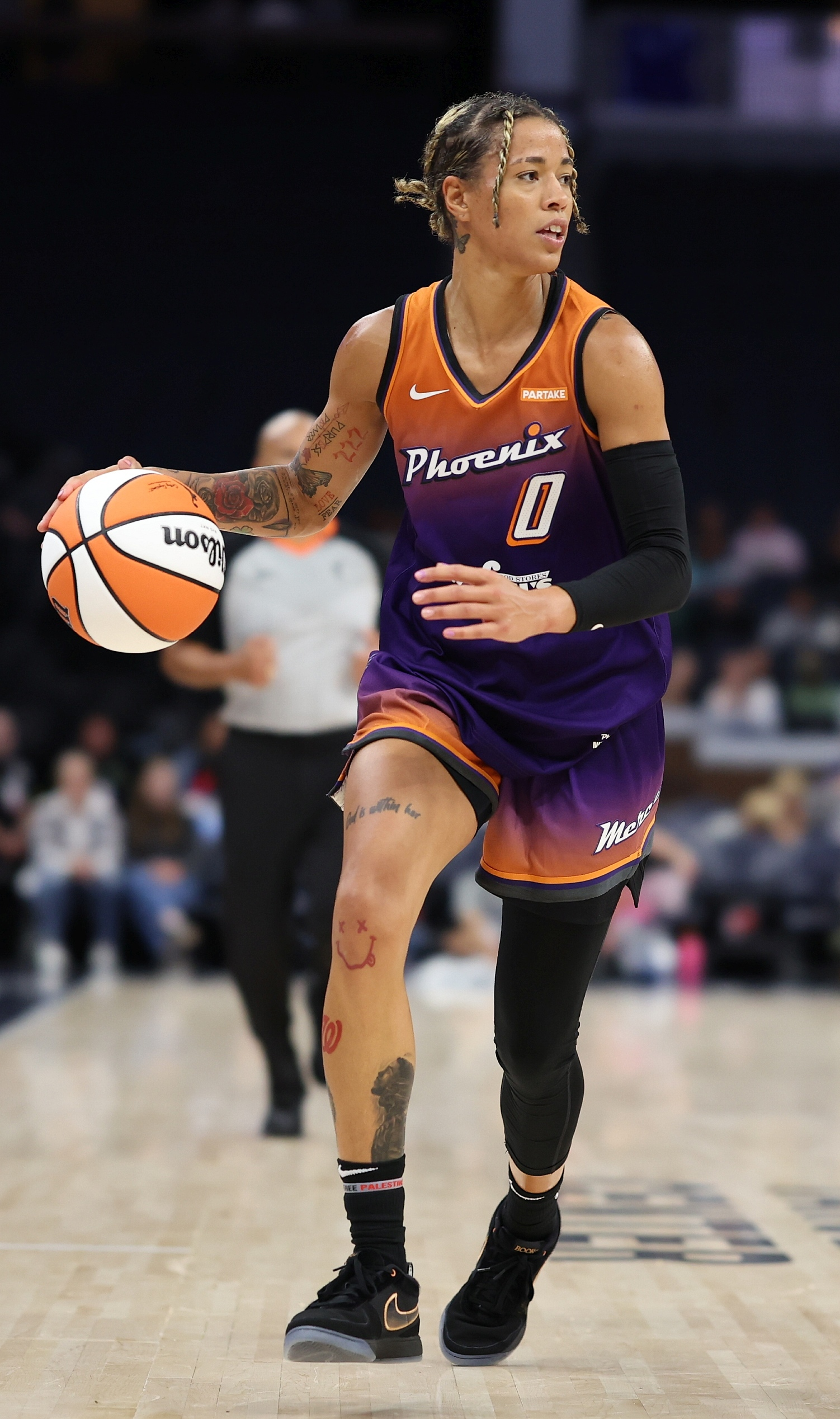
- Cloud with the Phoenix Mercury in 2024

No. 9 – Chicago Sky
- Position: Point guard
- League: WNBA

Personal information
- Born: February 22, 1992 (age 34) Broomall, Pennsylvania, U.S.
- Listed height: 5 ft 10 in (1.78 m)
- Listed weight: 160 lb (73 kg)

Career information
- High school: Cardinal O'Hara (Springfield, Pennsylvania)
- College: Maryland (2010–2011); St. Joseph's (2012–2015)
- WNBA draft: 2015: 2nd round, 15th overall pick
- Drafted by: Washington Mystics
- Playing career: 2015–present

Career history
- 2015–2019: Washington Mystics
- 2015–2016: Beşiktaş
- 2016–2017: Townsville Fire
- 2021–2023: Washington Mystics
- 2022–2024: Athletes Unlimited Pro Basketball
- 2024: Phoenix Mercury
- 2025–present: Phantom BC
- 2025: New York Liberty
- 2026–present: Chicago Sky

Career highlights
- WNBA champion (2019); WNBA Skills Challenge Champion (2025); WNBA assists leader (2022); Dawn Staley Community Leadership Award (2019); WNBA All-Defensive First Team (2022); 2× WNBA All-Defensive Second Team (2019, 2024); A-10 Defensive Player of the Year (2014); First-team All-A-10 (2015); 3× A-10 All-Defensive Team (2013–2015)
- Stats at Basketball Reference

Natasha Cloud (born February 22, 1992) is an American professional basketball player for the Chicago Sky of the Women's National Basketball Association (WNBA) and for the Phantom of Unrivaled.

== Early life ==
Cloud was born on February 22, 1992, in Broomall, Pennsylvania, to Sharon Cloud. Sharon cheated on her husband, Emil, resulting in conception of Natasha. Natasha was raised by Emil instead of her biological father, who she did not know growing up. She is one of five siblings. She is of mixed race heritage and was raised in a predominantly white community.

During high school, Cloud led Cardinal O'Hara to the Pennsylvania Interscholastic Athletic Association Class AAAA state finals as a junior and to the second round as a senior. She earned First Team All-Delco honors in both her junior and senior year. As a junior, she additionally earned a Pennsylvania AAAA Third Team All-State selection.

Natasha Cloud gained recognition after being named AAAA First Team All-State as a senior. During the season, she averaged 12.3 points, 7.9 rebounds, 5.2 assists, and 4.0 steals per game. She earned the Michael Menichini Award in 2009.

Following her high school career, Cloud received a scholarship to play at the University of Maryland as a Terrapin.

== College career ==
=== University of Maryland ===
==== 2010–2011 ====
Cloud played in 31 of 32 games of her freshman year and started six times. During the season, she led the team in assists twice and in blocks three times while also being named a Scholar Athlete.

Her coach, Brenda Frese, stated that:

Natasha is a very athletic and unselfish player who will do whatever her team needs to help us win. She's a strong defensive player, who can play either guard spot and is a terrific passer. Natasha has a ton of personality, is a good student and fits right in with our team.

Following the 2010-2011 basketball season, Cloud transferred to Saint Joseph's University.

=== Saint Joseph's University ===
==== 2011–2012 ====
Due to NCAA transfer rules, Cloud sat out the 2011–2012 season. She was named a member of the SJU Director's Honor Roll.

==== 2013–2014 ====
Cloud served as co-captain of her team. She earned Atlantic 10 (A10) Defensive Player of the Year and was additionally named to the A10 All-Conference Second Team. She was named to the Nancy Lieberman Award Watch List for the top point guard in the nation.

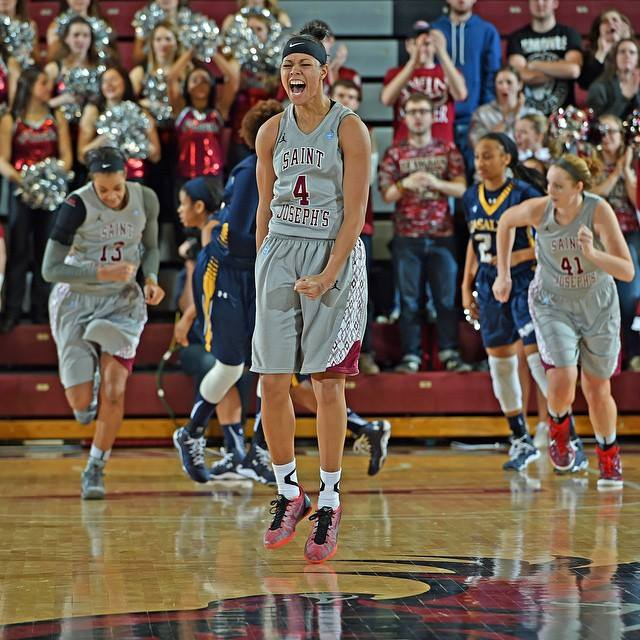
Cloud (center) at Saint Joseph's

During the season, Cloud averaged 11.5 points, 6.6 rebounds, and 7.6 assists per game. She ranked second nationally in assists per game, setting the SJU single-season record for assists (243) and leading the A10 in assists and assists to turnover ratio. During the 2014 NCAA tournament, she scored 13 points, seven rebounds, four assists, two blocked shots, and two steals in a first round win over Georgia. During the second round, she posted 10 points, six assists, one block, and one steal against Connecticut, the eventual champions.

==== 2014–2015 ====
Cloud served as the co-captain of her team for the second straight year. She was named Atlantic 10 All-Conference First Team and was an All-Defensive Team selection. She was a finalist for the Nancy Lieberman Award and Naismith Trophy Watch List nominee.

During the season, Cloud averaged 12.9 points a game and led the Atlantic 10 in assists and averaged minutes. She scored a career-high 29 points, 5 rebounds, 3 assists, 2 steals and a blocked shot against Liberty.

== Professional career ==
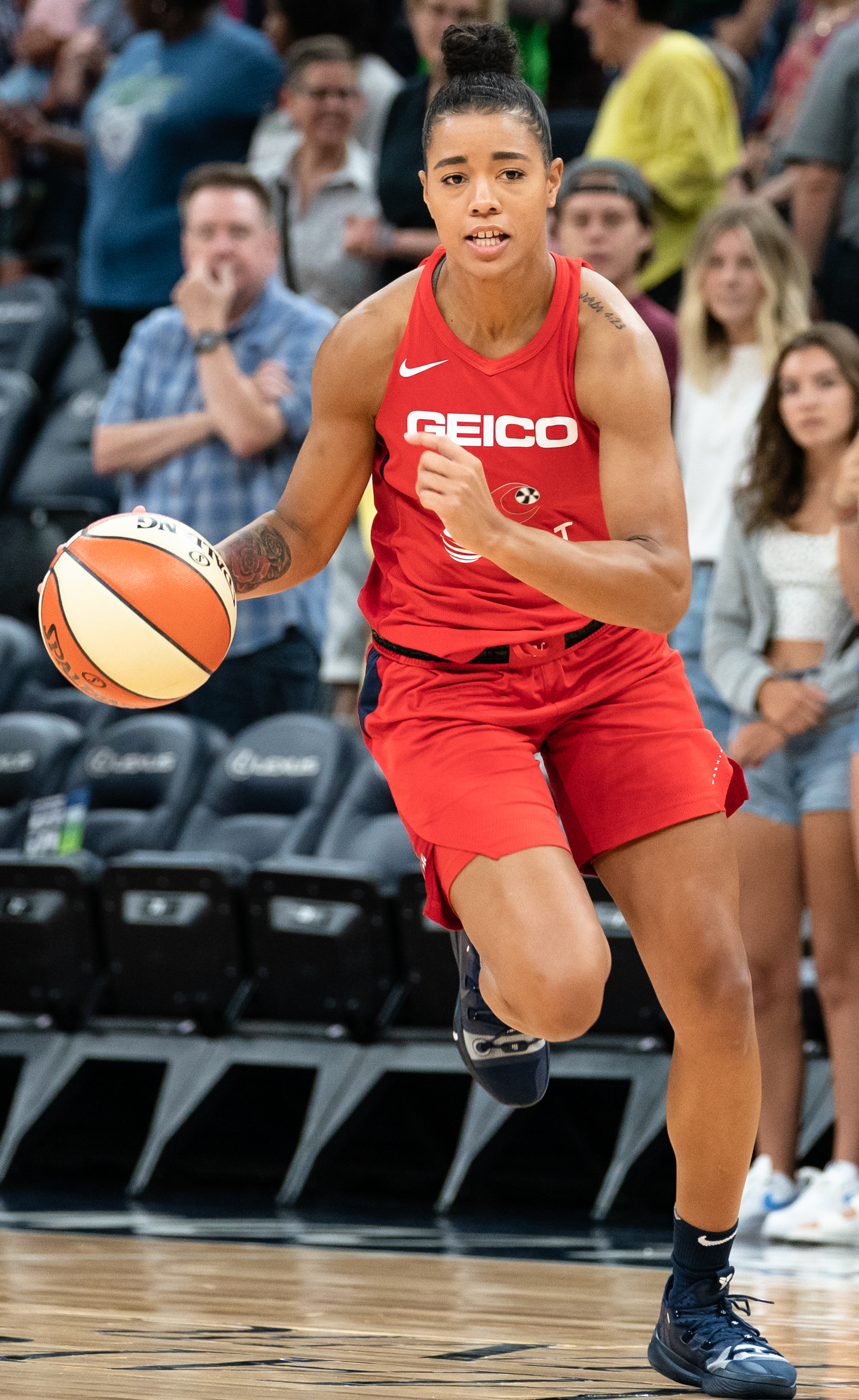
Cloud with the Washington Mystics in 2019

=== WNBA ===
==== Washington Mystics ====
Cloud was selected in the second round and 15th overall by the Washington Mystics in the 2015 WNBA draft. During her rookie season, she averaged 3.6 points, 2.8 rebounds, and 3.4 assists per game over an average of 19.3 minutes.

In 2016, Cloud suffered a left hip injury during practice at the Verizon Center.

On October 10, 2019, Cloud won her first WNBA championship.

In June 2020, Cloud announced that she would forgo the 2020 WNBA season due to concerns regarding the COVID-19 pandemic and a desire to focus on social justice advocacy.

==== Phoenix Mercury ====
After playing for the Mystics for nine years, Cloud signed to the Phoenix Mercury in 2024.

On February 2, 2025, Cloud was traded to the Connecticut Sun. The deal was originally reported as Cloud, Rebecca Allen, and the 12th pick in the 2025 WNBA draft for Alyssa Thomas and Tyasha Harris; however, it was officially part of a larger four-team trade.

==== New York Liberty ====
On March 16, 2025, Cloud was traded once again, this time to the New York Liberty for the 7th pick in the 2025 draft, and a first round draft pick in 2026. Cloud started 41 games for the New York Liberty in 2025, averaging 10.1 points, 5.1 assists, and 1.2 steals per game.

==== Chicago Sky ====
On May 4, 2026, Cloud signed a one-year, $550,000 contract, with the Chicago Sky. The general manager of the Chicago Sky, Jeff Pagliocca, said in a statement, "Natasha is one of the best passers and defenders in the league. She fits with the other proven winners on our roster."

During a game against the Indiana Fever on August 23, Cloud was involved in a verbal altercation with former NBA player Enes Kanter Freedom, who was sitting courtside and walked onto the court. Kanter had been involved in an anti-trans campaign surrounding the WNBA and was wearing a shirt with similar messaging. The incident resulted in Kanter being escorted from the arena.

=== International ===
During the 2015–2016 season, Cloud played in Istanbul, Turkey for Beşiktaş.

=== Athletes Unlimited Pro Basketball ===
From 2022 to 2024, Cloud played for Athletes Unlimited Pro Basketball. She was a member of the Player Executive Committee from 2022 to 2023 and named to the league's 2023 All Defense Team.

=== Unrivaled ===
On August 27, 2024, it was announced that Cloud would appear and play in the inaugural season of Unrivaled, the women's 3-on-3 basketball league founded by Napheesa Collier and Breanna Stewart. Cloud was initially drafted to Laces BC before being traded to Lunar Owls BC and then finally to Phantom BC in the franchise's first trade movement. She played 18 games with Phantom BC, averaging 9.7 points, 4.9 rebounds, and 4.7 assists.

== National team career ==
Cloud played for Jordan at the 2021 FIBA Women's Asia Cup in Amman, Jordan. She helped her team to reach the promotion playoff final, before losing to Lebanon and missing promotion to Division A.

== Career statistics ==
Legend
GP	Games played	GS	Games started	MPG	Minutes per game	RPG	Rebounds per game
APG	Assists per game	SPG	Steals per game	BPG	Blocks per game	PPG	Points per game
TO	Turnovers per game	FG%	Field-goal percentage	3P%	3-point field-goal percentage	FT%	Free-throw percentage
**Bold**	Career best	°	League leader

†	Denotes season(s) in which Cloud won a WNBA championship

=== WNBA ===
==== Regular season ====
Stats current through end of 2026 season

WNBA regular season statistics
Year	Team	GP	GS	MPG	FG%	3P%	FT%	RPG	APG	SPG	BPG	TO	PPG
2015	Washington	34	22	19.3	.320	.237	.681	2.8	3.4	0.9	0.1	1.4	3.6
2016	Washington	31	28	24.3	.348	.338	.754	3.0	3.8	0.8	0.1	1.4	5.7
2017	Washington	24	0	18.7	.314	.235	.741	2.5	2.9	0.7	0.1	**1.0**	4.4
2018	Washington	27	22	26.5	.436	**.386**	.778	3.2	4.6	0.7	0.1	1.7	8.6
2019^{†}	Washington	34	34	32.1	.394	.326	.683	2.5	5.6	1.0	0.2	1.9	9.0
2020	Did not play (opted out)												
2021	Washington	27	27	31.6	.389	.274	.836	3.6	6.4	**1.4**	0.1	2.2	8.7
2022	Washington	34	34	31.3	.399	.319	.824	3.6	**7.0**	1.0	0.3	2.8	10.7
2023	Washington	37	37	32.4	.377	.298	**.900**	3.7	6.2	1.1	0.3	2.6	**12.7**
2024	Phoenix	38	38	**33.3**	.397	.308	.826	**4.1**	6.9	**1.4**	**0.6**	3.0	11.5
2025	New York	**41**	**41**	29.0	.433	.338	.870	3.7	5.1	1.2	0.3	1.9	10.1
2026	Chicago	40	27	28.2	**.490**	.357	.855	3.4	4.8	1.1	0.3	2.2	11.1
**Career**	11 years, 4 teams	367	310	28.2	.401	.318	.819	3.3	5.2	1.0	0.2	2.0	9.0

==== Playoffs ====
WNBA playoff statistics
Year	Team	GP	GS	MPG	FG%	3P%	FT%	RPG	APG	SPG	BPG	TO	PPG
2015	Washington	3	2	14.0	.429	.333	—	1.0	1.3	1.0	0.0	1.7	2.3
2017	Washington	5	0	17.4	.333	.333	.750	2.4	2.2	0.6	0.2	1.8	4.8
2018	Washington	**9**	**9**	25.7	.400	.414	.769	3.4	4.1	0.8	0.1	1.9	8.2
2019^{†}	Washington	**9**	**9**	34.2	.442	.378	.850	3.4	6.2	1.1	0.2	**1.3**	13.1
2022	Washington	2	2	35.5	.500	**.700**	**1.000**	6.0	3.0	0.5	**1.5**	3.0	18.5
2023	Washington	2	2	**37.0**	.433	.500	**1.000**	**7.0**	8.5	2.0°	0.0	1.5	18.5
2024	Phoenix	2	2	36.5	.543	.462	.833	5.5	**10.0**°	1.0	0.5	3.0	**24.5**°
2025	New York	3	3	34.3	**.565**	.500	.857	3.7	3.0	**2.7**	0.3	3.0	12.7
**Career**	8 years, 3 teams	35	29	28.3	.448	.435	.850	3.6	4.6	1.1	0.3	1.9	11.0

=== College ===
Year	Team	GP	Points	FG%	3P%	FT%	RPG	APG	SPG	BPG	PPG
2010–11	Maryland	31	76	37.9%	26.3%	69.2%	1.5	2.0	0.7	0.2	2.5
2011–12	Saint Joseph's	redshirt									
2012–13	Saint Joseph's	**32**	293	**38.9%**	14.8%	73.6%	4.6	4.4	1.8	0.5	9.2
2013–14	Saint Joseph's	**32**	368	39.2%	27.4%	71.7%	**6.6**	**7.6**	**2.0**	0.5	11.5
2014–15	Saint Joseph's	30	**388**	36.8%	**35.1%**	**79.1%**	5.9	6.6	1.8	0.4	**12.9**
**Career**		125	1125	38.2%	28.6%	74.4%	4.6	5.2	1.6	0.4	9.0

== Personal life ==
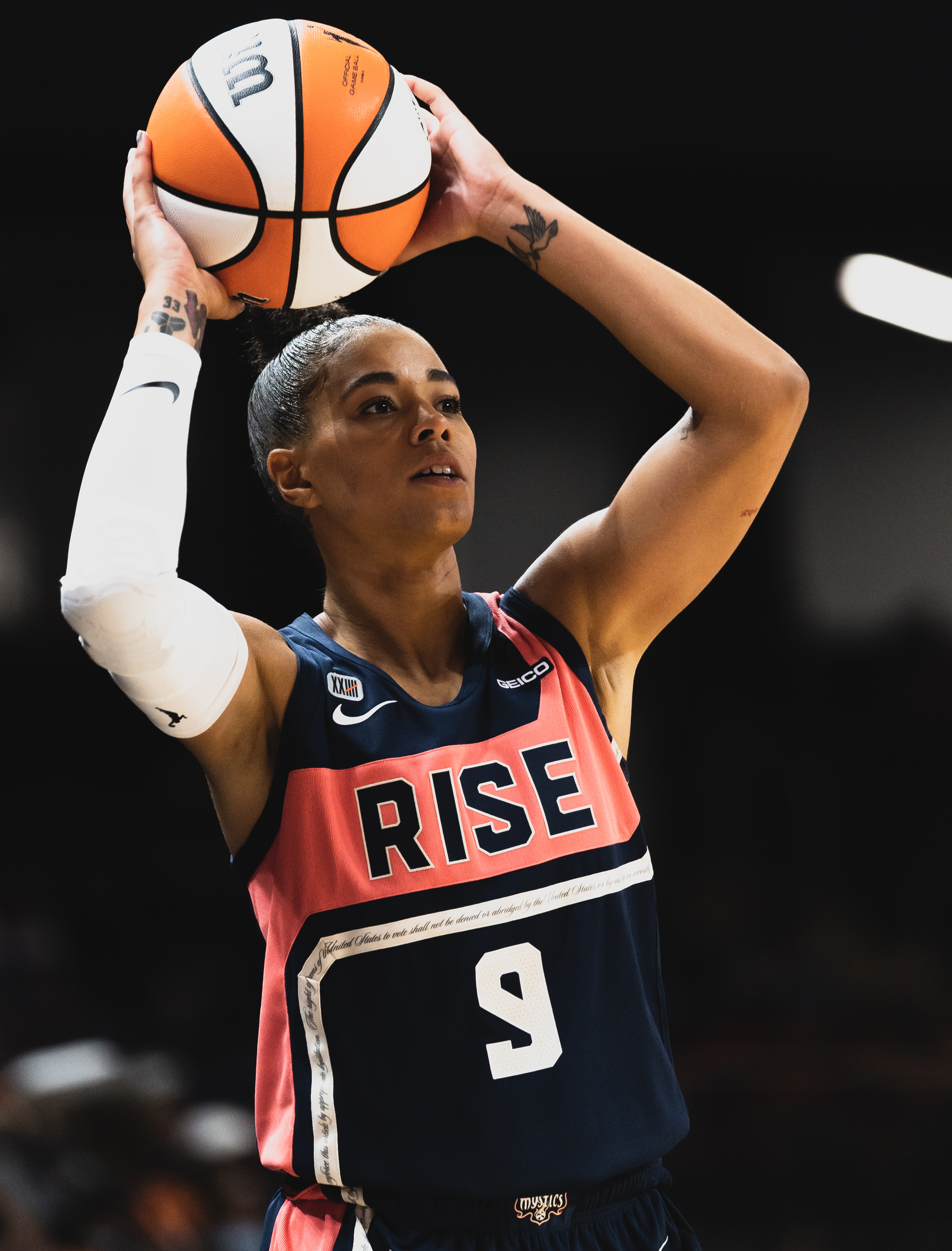
Cloud with the Washington Mystics in 2019

Natasha Cloud is a lesbian who has been an outspoken activist for marginalized communities. She has denounced the WNBA ignoring LGBTQ players in the league's marketing and promotional drives.

She married professional softball player Aleshia Ocasio in 2020. They later divorced. As of 2025, Cloud was dating her then-teammate Isabelle Harrison since 2021.

In December 2020, Cloud was named to Forbes 30 Under 30 alongside fellow WNBA players A'ja Wilson and Chiney Ogwumike.

In February 2024, Cloud joined the WNBA Changemakers Collective and their collaboration with VOICEINSPORT (VIS) as a mentor, "aimed at keeping girls in sport and developing diverse leaders on the court and beyond the game."

== See also ==
- List of WNBA annual assists leaders
- List of WNBA career assists leaders
