= 2018 Washington Mystics season =

- Head coach: Mike Thibault
- Arena: Capital One Arena

Results
- Record: 22–12 (.647)
- Place: 2nd (Eastern)
- Playoff finish: 3rd seed; lost in WNBA Finals to Seattle Storm 0–3.

Media
- Television: NBC Sports Washington and Monumental Sports Network

The 2018 WNBA season is the 21st for the Washington Mystics of the Women's National Basketball Association which began on May 20, 2018. The Mystics qualified for the WNBA Playoffs and reached the WNBA Finals for the first time in franchise history.

The Mystics started the season strong with a 5–1 record in May. Their only loss came to eventual league champions Seattle. However, the team couldn't carry this momentum into June, where they went 5–5. The Mystics lost 4 of their first 5 games in June, but turned it around in the second half of the month, winning 4 of their last 5. The up and down season continued into July, where they again went 5–5. The Mystics finished the season just like they started it, strongly. With a 7–1 August record, the team secured a first round playoff bye, and the third overall seed. The Mystics won seven straight games before dropping their season finale against Minnesota. Their final record of 22–12 tied a franchise best, previously set in 2010.

The Mystics hosted a second round playoff game against the Los Angeles Sparks and won 96–64. This win saw them advance to the semifinals where they met the Atlanta Dream. In the best of five series, the Mystics won the final two games to advance to the 2018 WNBA Finals against the Storm. An injury to star Elena Delle Donne in the semifinals hampered her in the finals, and the Mystics were swept 0–3.

== Transactions ==
=== WNBA draft ===
Round	Pick	Player	Nationality	School/Team/Country
1	7	Ariel Atkins	United States	Texas
2	19	Myisha Hines-Allen	United States	Louisville
3	31	Rebecca Greenwell	United States	Duke

=== Trades/Roster Changes ===
Date	Details
February 1, 2018	C Emma Meesseman to miss 2018 season due to rest.
February 1, 2018	Signed F/G Monique Currie.
February 2, 2018	Re-Signed F Tianna Hawkins, F Allison Hightower, and F LaToya Sanders
February 5, 2018	Re-Signed F Asia Taylor
February 5, 2018	Signed F Devereaux Peters
July 23, 2018	Traded G Tayler Hill and 2019 WNBA draft second round pick and the rights to swap first round picks to Dallas Wings in exchange for F Aerial Powers.

== Roster ==
2018 Washington Mystics roster
Players
Coaches

Pos.	No.	Nat.	Name	Height	Weight	DOB	From	Yrs
G	7	(United States)	Atkins, Ariel	5' 11" (1.8m)	160 lb (73kg)	1996-07-30	Texas	R
G	15	(United States)	Cloud, Natasha	6' 0" (1.83m)	160 lb (73kg)	1992-02-22	Saint Joseph's	3
F	25	(United States)	Currie, Monique	6' 0" (1.83m)	175 lb (79kg)	1983-02-25	Duke	12
G/F	11	(United States)	Delle Donne, Elena	6' 5" (1.96m)	187 lb (85kg)	1989-09-05	Delaware	5
F	21	(United States)	Hawkins, Tianna	6' 3" (1.91m)	193 lb (88kg)	1991-03-02	Maryland	4
F	2	(United States)	Hines-Allen, Myisha	6' 2" (1.88m)	200 lb (91kg)	1996-05-30	Louisville	R
G/F	23	(United States)	Powers, Aerial	6' 0" (1.83m)	157 lb (71kg)	1994-07-17	Michigan State	2
G	14	(United States)	Ruffin-Pratt, Tierra	5' 11" (1.8m)	180 lb (82kg)	1991-04-11	North Carolina	5
F/C	30	(United States)	Sanders, LaToya	6' 3" (1.91m)	170 lb (77kg)	1986-09-11	North Carolina	5
C	34	(United States)	Thomas, Krystal	6' 5" (1.96m)	210 lb (95kg)	1989-06-10	Duke	6
G	20	(United States)	Toliver, Kristi	5' 7" (1.7m)	130 lb (59kg)	1987-01-27	Maryland	9
G	32	(United States)	Walker-Kimbrough, Shatori	5' 11" (1.8m)	142 lb (64kg)	1995-05-18	Maryland	1

Head coach
(United States) Mike Thibault (Saint Martin's)
Assistant coaches
(United States) Marianne Stanley (Immaculata)
(United States) Eric Thibault (Missouri)
Athletic trainer
(United States) Chalisa Fonza (Western Illinois)

Legend

- (C) Team captain
- (DP) Unsigned draft pick
- (FA) Free agent
- (S) Suspended
- Injured

== Game log ==
=== Preseason ===
2018 pre-season game log
May: 2–0 (Home: 1–0; Road: 1–0)

Game	Date	Team	Score	High points	High rebounds	High assists	Location Attendance	Record
1	May 6	vs. Minnesota	W 90–85	Ruffin-Pratt (17)	Peters (6)	Tied (3)	Wells Fargo Arena; 4,203	1–0
2	May 12	vs. Indiana	W 91–56	Tied (15)	Hawkins (6)	Currie (3)	Acierno Arena (University of Delaware); 3,323	2–0

2018 pre-season schedule

=== Regular season ===
2018 game log
Total: 22–12 (Home: 12–5; Road: 10–7)
May: 5–1 (Home: 3–0; Road: 2–1)

Game	Date	Team	Score	High points	High rebounds	High assists	Location Attendance	Record
1	May 20	Indiana	W 82–75	Toliver (16)	Delle Donne (5)	Delle Donne (7)	Capital One Arena; 7,400	1–0
2	May 22	Las Vegas	W 75–70	Delle Donne (23)	Delle Donne (11)	Cloud (5)	Capital One Arena; 4,509	2–0
3	May 24	@ Indiana	W 93–84	Delle Donne (26)	Delle Donne (10)	Tied (4)	Bankers Life Fieldhouse; 4,415	3–0
4	May 27	Minnesota	W 90–78	Toliver (19)	Hines–Allen (13)	Cloud (8)	Capital One Arena; 5,723	4–0
5	May 29	@ Seattle	L 77–81	Toliver (20)	Hines–Allen (11)	Ruffin-Pratt (5)	KeyArena; 4,453	4–1
6	May 30	@ Phoenix	W 103–95	Toliver (30)	Hawkins (12)	Atkins (4)	Talking Stick Resort Arena; 8,188	5–1

June : 5–5 (Home: 3–4; Road: 2–1)

Game	Date	Team	Score	High points	High rebounds	High assists	Location Attendance	Record
7	June 1	@ Las Vegas	L 73–74	Currie (24)	Currie (8)	Toliver (4)	Mandalay Bay Events Center; 5,575	5–2
8	June 3	Connecticut	L 64–88	Atkins (14)	Tied (4)	Tied (3)	Capital One Arena; 5,176	5–3
9	June 7	Minnesota	L 80–88	Cloud (17)	Cloud (5)	Cloud (9)	Capital One Arena; 8,587	5–4
10	June 13	@ Connecticut	W 95–91	Delle Donne (36)	Delle Donne (5)	Toliver (4)	Mohegan Sun Arena	6–4
11	June 15	Los Angeles	L 86–97	Delle Donne (18)	Sanders (11)	Toliver (8)	Capital One Arena; 5,289	6–5
12	June 19	Chicago	W 88–60	Toliver (19)	Delle Donne (7)	Toliver (8)	Capital One Arena; 4,206	7–5
13	June 22	@ Chicago	W 93–77	Delle Donne (30)	Sanders (11)	Delle Donne (6)	Wintrust Arena; 5,831	8–5
14	June 26	Connecticut	W 92–80	Delle Donne (25)	Sanders (8)	Toliver (8)	Capital One Arena; 4,139	9–5
15	June 28	New York	W 80–77	Delle Donne (22)	Sanders (6)	Tied (3)	Capital One Arena; 4,473	10–5
16	June 30	Phoenix	L 74–84	Delle Donne (27)	Delle Donne (13)	Cloud (4)	Capital One Arena; 6,218	10–6

July : 5–5 (Home: 2–1; Road: 3–4)

Game	Date	Team	Score	High points	High rebounds	High assists	Location Attendance	Record
17	July 5	New York	W 86–67	Delle Donne (21)	Cloud (6)	Cloud (10)	Capital One Arena; 4,674	11–6
18	July 7	@ Los Angeles	W 83–74	Toliver (20)	Sanders (8)	Tied (3)	Staples Center; 10,163	12–6
19	July 8	@ Seattle	L 91–97	Delle Donne (29)	Delle Donne (7)	Toliver (6)	KeyArena; 8,724	12–7
20	July 11	Atlanta	L 89–106	Cloud (17)	Delle Donne (9)	Toliver (5)	Capital One Arena; 11,354	12–8
21	July 13	Chicago	W 88–72	Tied (25)	Sanders (8)	Cloud (7)	Capital One Arena; 5,858	13–8
22	July 15	@ Atlanta	L 77–80	Delle Donne (23)	Delle Donne (11)	Toliver (6)	McCamish Pavilion; 3,880	13–9
23	July 19	@ Dallas	L 81–90	Sanders (25)	Delle Donne (13)	Toliver (9)	College Park Center; 4,411	13–10
24	July 21	@ New York	W 95–78	Delle Donne (30)	Delle Donne (10)	Toliver (8)	Westchester County Center; 2,005	14–10
25	July 24	@ Connecticut	L 68–94	Delle Donne (21)	Sanders (6)	Tied (4)	Mohegan Sun Arena; 5,125	14–11
26	July 31	@ Atlanta	W 86–71	Delle Donne (28)	Delle Donne (16)	Toliver (4)	McCamish Pavilion; 3,648	15–11

August : 7–1 (Home: 4–0; Road: 3–1)

Game	Date	Team	Score	High points	High rebounds	High assists	Location Attendance	Record
27	August 3	Las Vegas	W 20-0	–	–	–	Capital One Arena; 0	16–11
28	August 5	@ Dallas	W 76–74	Toliver (16)	Powers (6)	Toliver (5)	College Park Center; 5,623	17–11
29	August 7	@ Phoenix	W 103–98	Delle Donne (30)	Sanders (5)	Cloud (6)	Talking Stick Resort Arena; 7,769	18–11
30	August 9	Seattle	W 100–77	Delle Donne (30)	Sanders (12)	Cloud (8)	Capital One Arena; 6,808	19–11
31	August 12	Dallas	W 93–80	Atkins (26)	Sanders (9)	Toliver (7)	Capital One Arena; 6,362	20–11
32	August 15	@ Indiana	W 76–62	Delle Donne (25)	Sanders (13)	Cloud (7)	Bankers Life Fieldhouse; 7,636	21–11
33	August 17	Los Angeles	W 69–67	Delle Donne (16)	Tied (10)	Tied (5)	Capital One Arena; 7,400	22–11
34	August 19	@ Minnesota	L 83–88	Toliver (17)	Tied (5)	Toliver (4)	Target Center; 13,013	22–12

2018 season schedule

=== Playoffs ===
2018 playoff game log
Total: 4–5 (Home: 2–2; Road: 2–3)
Second Round: 1–0 (Home: 1–0; Road: 0–0)

Game	Date	Team	Score	High points	High rebounds	High assists	Location Attendance	Series
1	August 23	Los Angeles	W 96–64	Donne (19)	Donne (12)	Toliver (9)	Charles Smith Center; 3,548	1–0

Semifinals: 3–2 (Home: 1–1; Road: 2–1)

Game	Date	Team	Score	High points	High rebounds	High assists	Location Attendance	Series
1	August 26	@ Atlanta	W 87–84	Delle Donne (32)	Delle Donne (13)	Toliver (6)	McCamish Pavilion; 5,086	1–0
2	August 28	@ Atlanta	L 75–78	Delle Donne (27)	Delle Donne (14)	Tied (6)	McCamish Pavilion; 3,813	1–1
3	August 31	Atlanta	L 76–81	Powers (18)	Hawkins (9)	Toliver (6)	Charles Smith Center; 3,867	1–2
4	September 2	Atlanta	W 97–76	4 Tied (12)	Delle Donne (10)	Toliver (7)	Charles Smith Center; 3,722	2–2
5	September 4	@ Atlanta	W 86–81	Atkins (20)	Delle Donne (11)	Cloud (5)	McCamish Pavilion; 4,435	3–2

WNBA Finals: 0–3 (Home: 0–1; Road: 0–2)

Game	Date	Team	Score	High points	High rebounds	High assists	Location Attendance	Series
1	September 7	@ Seattle	L 76–89	Atkins (23)	Delle Donne, Hawkins (7)	Cloud (5)	KeyArena; 11,486	0–1
2	September 9	@ Seattle	L 73–75	Delle Donne (17)	Sanders (5)	Toliver (3)	KeyArena; 14,212	0–2
3	September 12	Seattle	L 82–98	Delle Donne (23)	Delle Donne (5)	Toliver (5)	EagleBank Arena; 9,164	0–3

2018 playoff schedule

== Standings ==
#	Eastern Conference	W	L	PCT	GB	Home	Road	Conf.
1	Atlanta Dream (2)	23	11	.676	–	13–4	10–7	12–4
2	Washington Mystics (3)	22	12	.647	1	12–5	10–7	12–4
3	Connecticut Sun (4)	21	13	.618	2	13–4	8–9	9–7
4	e – Chicago Sky	13	21	.382	10	7–10	6–11	6–10
5	e – New York Liberty	7	27	.206	16	4–13	3–14	6–10
6	e – Indiana Fever	6	28	.176	17	2–15	4–13	3–13

== Playoffs ==
**First round** Single elimination (Aug. 21)
5	**Phoenix Mercury**	**101**
8	Dallas Wings	83
6	**Los Angeles Sparks**	**75**
7	Minnesota Lynx	68

**Second round** Single elimination (Aug. 23)
4	Connecticut Sun	86
5	**Phoenix Mercury**	**96**
3	**Washington Mystics**	**96**
6	Los Angeles Sparks	64

**Semifinals**; Best-of-5 (Aug. 26 – Sept. 4)
1	**Seattle Storm**	**3**
5	Phoenix Mercury	2
2	Atlanta Dream	2
3	**Washington Mystics**	**3**

**WNBA Finals**; Best-of-5 (Sept. 7 – Sept. 12)
1	**Seattle Storm**	**3**
3	Washington Mystics	0

Note: Teams re-seeded after second round and semi-finals.

- **Bold** – Game or series winner
- Italic – Team with home-court advantage

== Statistics ==
Legend
GP	Games played	GS	Games started	MPG	Minutes per game	RPG	Rebounds per game
APG	Assists per game	SPG	Steals per game	BPG	Blocks per game	PPG	Points per game
FG%	Field-goal percentage	3P%	3-point field-goal percentage	FT%	Free-throw percentage	TO	Turnovers per game
PF	Fouls per game		Team leader		League leader

=== Regular season ===
Player	GP	GS	MPG	FG%	3P%	FT%	RPG	APG	SPG	BPG	PPG
Elena Delle Donne	29	29	32.2	.488	.405	.887	7.2	2.3	0.9	1.4	20.7
Kristi Toliver	33	33	32.9	.433	.360	.918	2.3	4.4	1.2	0.0	13.9
Ariel Atkins	29	24	22.5	.432	.357	.824	2.4	2.1	1.3	0.3	11.3
LaToya Sanders	28	25	24.5	.607	.000	.869	6.4	1.6	1.3	1.1	10.2
Natasha Cloud	27	22	26.5	.436	.386	.778	3.2	4.6	0.8	0.1	8.6
Monique Currie	32	9	15.9	.395	.293	.831	3.0	0.8	0.4	0.2	6.6
Tianna Hawkins	32	4	16.6	.443	.357	.824	3.5	0.8	0.5	0.4	6.3
Aerial Powers	9	0	12.7	.450	.438	1.00	3.2	0.9	0.7	0.4	6.1
Tierra Ruffin-Pratt	33	10	18.1	.341	.314	.855	2.0	1.5	0.6	0.2	5.5
Myisha Hines-Allen	24	1	10.5	.450	.333	.654	2.9	0.4	0.4	0.2	3.8
Shatori Walker-Kimbrough	19	1	8.8	.429	.304	1.00	0.8	0.4	0.4	0.3	3.5
Krystal Thomas	24	7	9.9	.429	.000	.636	2.5	0.2	0.2	0.1	1.8

== Awards and honors ==
Recipient	Award	Date awarded	Ref.
Elena Delle Donne	WNBA Eastern Conference Player of the Week	June 18, 2018	
Elena Delle Donne	WNBA Eastern Conference Player of the Week	July 2, 2018	
Elena Delle Donne	WNBA Eastern Conference Player of the Month - June	July 3, 2018	
Elena Delle Donne	WNBA Eastern Conference Player of the Week	July 9, 2018	
Elena Delle Donne	WNBA All-Star Captain	July 17, 2018	
Kristi Toliver	WNBA All-Star Selection	July 17, 2018	
Elena Delle Donne	WNBA Eastern Conference Player of the Week	August 13, 2018	
Elena Delle Donne	WNBA Eastern Conference Player of the Month - August	August 20, 2018	
Ariel Atkins	All-Defensive Second Team	August 30, 2018	
Ariel Atkins	All-Rookie Team	September 9, 2018	
Elena Delle Donne	All-WNBA First Team	September 12, 2018	
