= 2018 WNBA playoffs =

Professional women's basketball tournament

- Dates: August 21 – September 12, 2018

Final positions
- Champions: Seattle Storm
- Runners-up: Washington Mystics

Tournament statistics
- Scoring leader (s): Breanna Stewart (Seattle) (24.6 PPG)

Awards
- MVP: Breanna Stewart (Seattle)

The 2018 WNBA playoffs were the postseason tournament of the WNBA's 2018 season. The Seattle Storm won the team's third WNBA title, sweeping the Washington Mystics 3–0 in the best-of-five WNBA Finals.

== Format ==
Following the WNBA regular season, the top eight teams in the overall league standings, without regard to conference alignment, qualified for the playoffs and were seeded 1 to 8. Seedings were based strictly on regular-season record. The team with the best record received the #1 seed, the team with the next best record received the #2 seed, and so on. The top two seeds earned double byes (i.e., advanced directly to the semifinals), while the next two seeds received first-round byes.

These seedings were used to create a bracket that determines the matchups throughout the playoffs. The first round of the playoffs consisted of two matchups based on the seedings (5-8 and 6–7). The two winners advanced to the second round with a matchup between the number 3 seed and the lower of the advancing seeds and another matchup between the number 4 seed and the other first round winner. The winners of the first two rounds advanced to the semifinals, where the lower-ranked seed of the winners faces the number 1 seed, with the other remaining team facing the number 2 seed.

The first two rounds were single-elimination games played on the higher ranking seed's home court. The semifinals and WNBA Finals are best-of-five series played in a 2-2-1 format, meaning the team with home-court advantage (better record) hosts games 1, 2, and 5 while their opponent hosts games 3 and 4.

=== Tiebreak procedures ===
1. Better winning percentage among all head-to-head games involving tied teams.
2. Better winning percentage against all teams with .500 or better record at the end of the season.
3. Better point differential in games net result of total points scored less total points allowed head-to-head.
4. Better point differential net result of total points scored less total points allowed against all opponents.
5. Coin toss (or draw of lots, if at least 3 teams are still tied after the first 4 tiebreakers fail).

== Playoff qualifying ==
Seed	Team	Record	Clinched		
Seed	Team	Record	Playoff berth	Bye to Semis	Top Record
1	Seattle Storm	26–8	Yes	Yes	Yes
2	Atlanta Dream	23–11	Yes	Yes	No
3	Washington Mystics	22–12	Yes	No	No
4	Connecticut Sun	21–13	Yes	No	No
5	Phoenix Mercury	20–14	Yes	No	No
6	Los Angeles Sparks	19–15	Yes	No	No
7	Minnesota Lynx	18–16	Yes	No	No
8	Dallas Wings	15–19	Yes	No	No

== Bracket ==
**First round** Single elimination (Aug. 21)
5	**Phoenix Mercury**	**101**
8	Dallas Wings	83
6	**Los Angeles Sparks**	**75**
7	Minnesota Lynx	68

**Second round** Single elimination (Aug. 23)
4	Connecticut Sun	86
5	**Phoenix Mercury**	**96**
3	**Washington Mystics**	**96**
6	Los Angeles Sparks	64

**Semifinals**; Best-of-5 (Aug. 26 – Sept. 4)
1	**Seattle Storm**	**3**
5	Phoenix Mercury	2
2	Atlanta Dream	2
3	**Washington Mystics**	**3**

**WNBA Finals**; Best-of-5 (Sept. 7 – Sept. 12)
1	**Seattle Storm**	**3**
3	Washington Mystics	0

Note: Teams re-seeded after second round and semi-finals.

- **Bold** – Game or series winner
- Italic – Team with home-court advantage

== First round ==
=== Mercury vs. Wings ===
The first matchup of the first round saw #5 seed Phoenix Mercury host the #8 seed Dallas Wings. The Mercury won their last 4 regular season games, all at home, to finish the season with a 20–14 record. The Wings won their last 2 regular season games to make the playoffs and finish with a 15–19 record. These two games snapped a 9-game losing streak. The Wings made the playoffs by 1 game over the Las Vegas Aces and are the only team in the playoffs with a below .500 regular season record. Phoenix won the regular season series 2–1, with the home team winning 2 out of the 3 matchups.

The game was evenly poised headed into halftime, with the Mercury making a three-pointer at the buzzer to make the score 53–49 in their favor. However, the Mercury opened up a double-digit lead in the third quarter, when they made six three point field goals. Diana Taurasi of the Mercury improved to 12–0 in single elimination games in her career with the win.

ESPN2

August 21
8:30pm ET

Box Score

**#5 Phoenix Mercury** **101**, #8 Dallas Wings 83
Scoring by quarter: **29**–24, 24–**25**, **26**–15, **22**–19
Pts: DeWanna Bonner (29); Rebs: DeWanna Bonner/Stephanie Talbot (11); Asts: Diana Taurasi (12)	Pts: Skylar Diggins-Smith (23); Rebs: Liz Cambage (12); Asts: Skylar Diggins-Smith (7)

Wells Fargo Arena
Attendance: 4,976
Referees: Roy Gulbeyan
Maj Forsberg
Byron Jarrett
Tiffany Bird

=== Sparks vs. Lynx ===
The second matchup of the first round saw #6 seed Los Angeles Sparks host the #7 seed Minnesota Lynx. The Sparks lost 4 of their last 5 regular season games, to finish the season with a 19–15 record. The Lynx lost three of their last four regular-season games to finish the season with an 18–16 record. This was a rematch of the 2016 and 2017 WNBA Finals, which were won by the Sparks and Lynx respectively in a pair of 3–2 series. The Sparks won the regular season series between the teams 3–1, with the home team winning 3 of the 4 matchups. This will mark the 4th straight year these teams have met in the playoffs, with the last two being in the WNBA Finals.

In Lindsay Whalen's final WNBA game, the Lynx game up short, losing 68–75. The Sparks held a three-point lead at halftime and never looked back. With 1:56 remaining Maya Moore missed consecutive free throws, and Chelsea Gray sank a jumper at the other end to make the lead 5 points.

ESPN2

August 21
10:30pm ET

Box Score

**#6 Los Angeles Sparks** **75**, #7 Minnesota Lynx 68
Scoring by quarter: 15–**16**, **25**–21, **18**–15, **17**–16
Pts: Chelsea Gray (26); Rebs: Candace Parker (6); Asts: Chelsea Gray (6)	Pts: Sylvia Fowles (18); Rebs: Sylvia Fowles (12); Asts: Lindsay Whalen (5)

Staples Center
Attendance: 8,598
Referees: Michael Price
Brenda Pantoja
Tim Greene
Janetta Graham

== Second round ==
=== Mystics vs. Sparks ===
The first matchup of the second round saw the #3 seed Washington Mystics host the #6 seed Los Angeles Sparks. The Mystics finished the regular season on an 8–1 run to end with an overall 22–12 record. With the Mystics earning a first-round bye, they entered the game on three days of rest, having finished the regular season on August 19. By contrast, the Sparks had to fly to the East Coast for their season finale at Connecticut, return home for their first-round game against Minnesota, and make another cross-country flight for this game. The Mystics won the regular season series 2–1, with the home team winning 1 out of the 3 matchups. This game also featured the two winningest coaches in WNBA history: Mike Thibault (Mystics) and Brian Agler (Sparks).

The Mystics eased to a 96–64 win behind six double-figure scorers, led by a double-double from Elena Delle Donne. Due to renovations to Capital One Arena, the team announced that it would move all of its potential home playoff games to the Charles Smith Center on the campus of George Washington University in Washington's Foggy Bottom neighborhood.

ESPN2

August 23
6:30pm ET

Box Score

**#3 Washington Mystics** **96**, #6 Los Angeles Sparks 64
Scoring by quarter: **27**–16, **23**–13, **25**–17, **21**–18
Pts: Elena Delle Donne (19); Rebs: Elena Delle Donne (12); Asts: Kristi Toliver (9)	Pts: Candace Parker (16); Rebs: Candace Parker (8); Asts: 3 players (3)

Charles Smith Center
Attendance: 3,548
Referees: Kurt Walker
Jeff Wooten
Tiara Cruse
Isaac Barnett

=== Sun vs. Mercury ===
The first matchup of the second round saw #4 seed Connecticut Sun host the #5 seed Phoenix Mercury. The Sun won 9 of their last 10 regular season games, to finish the season with a 21–13 record. The Sun have been resting since August 19, by earning a first round bye. The Sun finished the season tied for the league's best home record at 13–4. The Mercury won their match-up in the first round to make it to this game. Mercury won the regular season series 2–1, with the home team winning all 3 games. This is the second consecutive year the Sun and Mercury will meet in the playoffs. In 2017, the Mercury won 88–83.

Diana Taurasi improved to 13–0 in playoff-deciding games when the Mercury won 96–86 in Connecticut. The Mercury turned around a 4-point half-time deficit to win by double digits. The game ended on a 15–5 run, in favor of the Mercury. The Mercury got big contributions from their starts Brittney Griner and Taurasi. Both scored 27 points. DeWanna Bonner also contributed with 23 points and 18 rebounds.

ESPN2

August 23
8:30pm ET

Box Score

#4 Connecticut Sun 86, #5 **Phoenix Mercury** **96**
Scoring by quarter: **25**–24, **19**–16, 27–**32**, 15–**24**
Pts: Courtney Williams (27); Rebs: Courtney Williams (8); Asts: Jonquel Jones (7)	Pts: Brittney Griner, Diana Taurasi (27); Rebs: DeWanna Bonner (18); Asts: Diana Taurasi, Stephanie Talbot, Briann January (5)

Mohegan Sun Arena
Attendance: 7,858
Referees: Eric Brewton
Jeff Smith
Billy Smith
Cheryl Flores

== Semifinals ==
=== Storm vs. Mercury ===
The first semifinal saw the #1 seed Seattle Storm matchup against the #5 seed Phoenix Mercury. The Storm finished their season strong, winning 6 of their last 7 regular season games, to finish the season with a 26–8 record. The Storm enjoyed a week's rest after posting the best record in the WNBA. The Mercury won their two single-elimination playoff games to make it to the semifinals. Phoenix entered the series on three days' rest after playing in Connecticut. Seattle won the regular season series 4–1, with the visiting team winning 4 out of the 5 matchups.

==== Game 1 ====
Before the game, Breanna Stewart was named the season's MVP and played a key role in a Game 1 victory for the Storm. The Storm used a big third quarter to expand on a 2-point halftime lead to pull out the win. The Mercury went on a 13–5 run in the fourth quarter, to cut a 16-point Storm lead to just 2. However, Jewell Loyd made two baskets with under a minute left to seal the win.

ESPN2

August 26
5:00pm ET

Box Score

#1 **Seattle Storm** **91**, #5 Phoenix Mercury 87
Scoring by quarter: 24–**26**, **30**–24, **25**–17, 12–**20**
Pts: Breanna Stewart (28); Rebs: Breanna Stewart (7); Asts: Sue Bird (10)	Pts: DeWanna Bonner (27); Rebs: DeWanna Bonner (13); Asts: Diana Taurasi (6)

KeyArena
Attendance: 9,686
Referees: Jeff Smith
Kurt Walker
Brenda Pantoja
Janetta Graham

==== Game 2 ====
Game 2 in the series appeared to be a blowout in favor of the Storm. The Storm led by 12 points at halftime and even extended that lead to 16 at the end of the third quarter. Into the fourth, they led by as many as 17 with six minutes left in the game. However, the Mercury came surging back to tie the game and send it into overtime. However, the Storm were able to secure the win in overtime. Sue Bird scored with 1:03 left in overtime, and made 2 free throws with 2 seconds left to secure the win.

ESPN2

August 28
10:00pm ET

Box Score

#1 **Seattle Storm** **91**, #5 Phoenix Mercury 87 (OT)
Scoring by quarter: 17–**18**, **27**–14, **23**–19, 12–**28**, Overtime: **12**–8
Pts: Breanna Stewart (27); Rebs: Crystal Langhorne (10); Asts: Sue Bird (6)	Pts: Diana Taurasi (28); Rebs: Brittney Griner (10); Asts: Diana Taurasi (8)

KeyArena
Attendance: 9,686
Referees: Michael Price
Brenda Pantoja
Byron Jarrett
Janetta Graham

==== Game 3 ====
Prior to the game Stephanie Talbot was ruled out due to a concussion. However, the Mercury's other stars played well to pull out a 20-point home win over the Storm. DeWanna Bonner scored 27 points and added 11 rebounds to lead the team in both categories. Phoenix again went on a big run in the 4th quarter, similar to the first two games of the series. However, in this game the run solidified a lead instead of making a comeback. The Storm now have an 8-game road playoff losing streak.

ESPNews, NBA TV

August 31
10:00pm ET

Box Score

#5 **Phoenix Mercury** **86**, #1 Seattle Storm 66
Scoring by quarter: **26**–16, 16–**19**, 18–**21**, **26**–10
Pts: DeWanna Bonner (27); Rebs: DeWanna Bonner, Brittney Griner (11); Asts: Yvonne Turner (6)	Pts: Natasha Howard (19); Rebs: Breanna Stewart (11); Asts: Sue Bird (11)

Talking Stick Resort Arena
Attendance: 15,185
Referees: Roy Gulbeyan
Maj Forsberg
Jeff Wooten
Cheryl Flores

==== Game 4 ====
The Storm carried an 11-point lead into halftime against the Mercury, but another Mercury second half comeback saw them even the series at 2 games apiece. The Mercury were down by as many as 17 in the first quarter. This is the fourth time that the Mercury have won an elimination game this post season. Brittney Griner and DeWanna Bonner lead the Mercury with 29 and 27 points, respectively. Sue Bird suffered a broken nose in the second quarter, but is expected to play in Game 5 on Tuesday.

ESPN2

September 2
5:00pm ET

Box Score

#5 **Phoenix Mercury** **86**, #1 Seattle Storm 84
Scoring by quarter: 16–**31**, **26**–22, **24**–18, **20**–13
Pts: Brittney Griner (29); Rebs: Brittney Griner (12); Asts: Diana Taurasi (4)	Pts: Breanna Stewart (22); Rebs: Jewell Loyd (9); Asts: Jewell Loyd (7)

Talking Stick Resort Arena
Attendance: 8,137
Referees: Michael Price
Eric Brewton
Brenda Pantoja
Cheryl Flores

==== Game 5 ====
In Game 5 it was Phoenix that started out hot, carrying a 5-point lead into halftime and leading by as many as 11 in the first half. Seattle was then the one to make a comeback, cutting the lead to 4 at the end of the third quarter and a big fourth-quarter lead by Sue Bird took Seattle to a 10-point win. Bird scored 14 of her 22 points in the fourth, including making 5 of 6 shots in the final 6 minutes. Seattle used an 18–6 run in the fourth to secure the victory. Seattle advanced to the WNBA Finals to face Washington.

This game marked the first time that Diana Taurasi had been on the losing side in an elimination game in her WNBA career. She had entered Game 5 with a 13–0 record in this situation.

ESPNews, NBA TV

September 4
10:00pm ET

Box Score

#1 **Seattle Storm** **94**, #5 Phoenix Mercury 84
Scoring by quarter: 22–**26**, 19–**20**, **18**–17, **35**–21
Pts: Breanna Stewart (28); Rebs: Alysha Clark (13); Asts: Sue Bird (5)	Pts: Brittney Griner (21); Rebs: Brittney Griner (9); Asts: Brittney Griner (6)
**Seattle wins series 3–2**

KeyArena
Attendance: 8,992
Referees: Kurt Walker
Maj Forsberg
Byron Jarrett
Cheryl Flores

=== Dream vs. Mystics ===
The second semifinal saw the #2 seed Atlanta Dream matchup against the #3 seed Washington Mystics. The Dream finished their season strong, winning 6 of their last 7 regular season games, to finish the season with a 23–11 record. The Dream come into the series enjoying a week's rest after posting the second best record in the WNBA. The Mystics won one single elimination playoff game to make it to the semifinals. Washington will be coming into the series on three days rest after playing at home on Thursday. Atlanta won the regular season series 2–1, with the visiting team winning 2 out of the 3 matchups.

==== Game 1 ====
The game started evenly as the teams were tied at 26 after the first period. In the second quarter, Washington pulled out to a 9-point lead. Atlanta won both quarters after the half, but it wasn't enough to win the opening game of the series. Elena Delle Donne put on an all-star performance in her 36 minutes played; scoring 32 points and adding 13 rebounds in the game.

ESPN2

August 26
3:00pm ET

Box Score

#2 Atlanta Dream 84, #3 **Washington Mystics** **87**
Scoring by quarter: 26–26, 16–**25**, **24**–19, **18**–17
Pts: Alex Bentley (19); Rebs: Jessica Breland, Elizabeth Williams (9); Asts: 5 Tied (2)	Pts: Elena Delle Donne (32); Rebs: Elena Delle Donne (13); Asts: Natasha Cloud (6)

McCamish Pavilion
Attendance: 5,086
Referees: Eric Brewton
Maj Forsberg
Tiara Cruse
Isaac Barnett

==== Game 2 ====
Game 2 of the series was poised to be another tight game in Atlanta. The Mystics led by 2 at halftime and the game was tied at the end of the third quarter. With two minutes remaining in the fourth quarter, the Mystics held a 70–68 lead. It was at this point Mystics star Elena Delle Donne suffered an knee injury and was removed from the game. The Dream finished the game on an 8–5 run and pulled out the victory to tie the series at 1 game apiece. Despite her shortened game, Delle Donne lead the Mystics in scoring and rebounding, and was tied for the team high in assists.

ESPN2

August 28
8:00pm ET

Box Score

#2 **Atlanta Dream** **78**, #3 Washington Mystics 75
Scoring by quarter: **17**–16, 17–**20**, **24**–22, **20**–17
Pts: Alex Bentley (22); Rebs: Jessica Breland (14); Asts: Tiffany Hayes (6)	Pts: Elena Delle Donne (27); Rebs: Donne (14); Asts: Natasha Cloud, Elena Delle Donne (6)

McCamish Pavilion
Attendance: 3,813
Referees: Roy Gulbeyan
Billy Smith
Jeff Wooten
Isaac Barnett

==== Game 3 ====
In a tight game which had 14 lead changes, the Dream used a strong fourth quarter to win Game 3. The Mystics were without star Elena Delle Donne, who suffered a bone bruise in Game 2. The Mystics tried to adjust their offensive strategy on the fly, but came up just short. Tiffany Hayes lead the Dream with 23 points and 11 rebounds to help the Dream take a 2–1 series lead.

ESPNews, NBA TV

August 31
8:00 PM ET

Box Score

#3 Washington Mystics 76, #2 **Atlanta Dream** **81**
Scoring by quarter: 13–**19**, **21**–18, **20**–19, 22–**25**
Pts: Aerial Powers (18); Rebs: Tianna Hawkins (9); Asts: Kristi Toliver (6)	Pts: Tiffany Hayes (23); Rebs: Jessica Breland, Tiffany Hayes (11); Asts: 4 Tied (3)

Charles Smith Center
Attendance: 3,867
Referees: Michael Price
Kurt Walker
Tim Greene
Tiffany Bird

==== Game 4 ====
The Mystics were bolstered by the return of Elena Delle Donne and won comfortably to tie the series 2–2. All five Mystics starters scored in double figures to contribute to the win. Four Dream starters scored 12 points each, but that wasn't enough to keep up with the Mystics. The series shifts back to Atlanta for the decisive Game 5. Atlanta hasn't lost back to back games since June 27–29.

ESPN2

September 2
3:00 PM ET

Box Score

#3 **Washington Mystics** **97**, #2 Atlanta Dream 76
Scoring by quarter: **20**–12, **24**–23, **28**–26, **25**–15
Pts: Toliver (22); Rebs: Elena Delle Donne (10); Asts: Kristi Toliver (7)	Pts: 4 Tied (12); Rebs: Jessica Breland (8); Asts: Renee Montgomery (10)

Charles Smith Center
Attendance: 3,722
Referees: Roy Gulbeyan
Maj Forsberg
Byron Jarrett
Billy Smith

==== Game 5 ====
Game five was a tight affair for the first half, with Atlanta holding a one-point lead going into halftime. With just under seven minutes remaining, the Dream led by 2, but then went cold. Washington went on a 9–0 run and never looked back. Washington had four players score in double digits and Atlanta had five players in double digits. Washington advanced to their first ever WNBA Finals to face Seattle.

ESPN2

September 4
8:00 PM ET

Box Score

#2 Atlanta Dream 81, #3 **Washington Mystics** **86**
Scoring by quarter: 24–24, **26**–25, 14–**18**, 17–**19**
Pts: Alex Bentley (16); Rebs: Jessica Breland (12); Asts: Tiffany Hayes (4)	Pts: Ariel Atkins (20); Rebs: Elena Delle Donne (11); Asts: Natasha Cloud (5)
**Washington wins series 3–2**

McCamish Pavilion
Attendance: 4,435
Referees: Michael Price
Brenda Pantoja
Billy Smith
Jeff Wooten

== WNBA Finals ==
Game 1

ESPNews

September 7
9:00 PM ET

Box Score

Washington Mystics 76, **Seattle Storm** **89**
Scoring by quarter: 13–**24**, 19–**24**, 21–**29**, **23**–12
Pts: Atkins (23); Rebs: Delle Donne, Hawkins (7); Asts: Cloud (5)	Pts: Loyd (23); Rebs: Clark, Howard, Loyd (5); Asts: Bird (7)

KeyArena
Attendance: 11,486
Referees: Michael Price
Eric Brewton
Maj Forsberg
Cheryl Flores

Game 2

ABC

September 9
3:30 PM ET

Box Score

Washington Mystics 73, **Seattle Storm** **75**
Scoring by quarter: 16–**25**, **24**–11, 21–**22**, 12–**17**
Pts: Delle Donne (17); Rebs: Sanders (7); Asts: Toliver, Atkins (3)	Pts: Stewart (25); Rebs: Howard (13); Asts: Bird, Loyd (4)

KeyArena
Attendance: 14,212
Referees: Kurt Walker
Maj Forsberg
Billy Smith
Cheryl Flores

Game 3

ESPN2

September 12
8 PM ET

Box Score

**Seattle Storm** **98**, Washington Mystics 82
Scoring by quarter: **20**–16, **27**–14, 22–**23**, 29–29
Pts: Stewart (30); Rebs: Howard (14); Asts: Bird (10)	Pts: Delle Donne (23); Rebs: Delle Donne (5); Asts: Toliver (5)
**Seattle wins series 3–0**

EagleBank Arena
Attendance: 9,164
Referees: Roy Gulbeyan
Brenda Pantoja
Byron Jarrett
Billy Smith
