= List of 2018 WNBA season transactions =

This is a list of transactions that have taken place during the off-season and the 2018 WNBA season.

== Retirement ==
Date	Name	Team(s) played (years)	Age	Notes	Ref.
August 21, 2017	(United States) Plenette Pierson	Phoenix Mercury (2003–2005); Detroit Shock (2006–2010); New York Liberty (2010–2014); Dallas Wings (2015–2016); Minnesota Lynx (2017)	36	3× WNBA champion (2006, 2008, 2017); WNBA All-Star (2015); WNBA Sixth Woman of the Year (2007); Also played overseas in Italy, Israel, Russia, Turkey, Slovakia and Korea.	
February 3, 2018	(United States) Jia Perkins	Charlotte Sting (2004–2005); Chicago Sky (2006–2010); San Antonio Stars (2011–2015); Minnesota Lynx (2016–2017)	35	WNBA champion (2017); WNBA All-Star (2009); WNBA All-Defensive Second Team (2013); Also played overseas in Israel and Turkey.	
April 29, 2018	(United States) Tiffany Jackson	New York Liberty (2007–2010); Tulsa Shock (2010–2015); Los Angeles Sparks (2017)	33	Became an assistant coach for Texas Longhorns	
August 21, 2018	(United States) Lindsay Whalen	Connecticut Sun (2004–2009); Minnesota Lynx (2010–2018)	36	4× WNBA champion (2011, 2013, 2015, 2017); 5× WNBA All-Star (2006, 2011, 2013–2015); 3× All-WNBA First Team (2008, 2011, 2013); 2× All-WNBA Second Team (2012, 2014); 3× WNBA Peak Performer (2008, 2011–2012); 3× WNBA assists leader (2008, 2011–2012); WNBA Top 20@20 (2016); WNBA playoffs all-time assists leader Also played overseas in Russia, Czech Republic, Turkey, and Northern Cyprus.	

== Front office movements ==
=== Head coach changes ===
Off-season

Departure date	Team	Outgoing head coach	Reason for departure	Hire date	Incoming head coach	Last coaching position	Ref.
September 5	Atlanta Dream	(United States) Michael Cooper	Fired	October 30	(United States) Nicki Collen	Connecticut Sun assistant coach (2016–2017)	
October 4	Seattle Storm	(United States) Gary Kloppenburg	Interim coach, contract not renewed	October 4	(United States) Dan Hughes	San Antonio Stars head coach (2011–2016)	
October 13	New York Liberty	(United States) Bill Laimbeer	Resigned	October 16	(United States) Katie Smith	New York Liberty associate coach (2016–2017)	
October 17	Las Vegas Aces	(United States) Vickie Johnson	Contract not renewed	October 17	(United States) Bill Laimbeer	New York Liberty head coach (2013–2017)	

In-season

Departure date	Team	Outgoing head coach	Reason for departure	Hire date	Incoming head coach	Last coaching position	Ref.
August 12	Dallas Wings	(United States) Fred Williams	Fired	August 12	(United States) Taj McWilliams-Franklin (interim)	Dallas Wings assistant coach (2017–2018)	

== Player movement ==
=== Trades ===
February
February 1	To Indiana Fever: (United States) Kayla Alexander	To Las Vegas Aces: 2019 second-round pick
February 2	To Connecticut Sun: (Australia) Cayla George	To Phoenix Mercury: 2018 second-round pick (#21)
February 2	To Las Vegas Aces: (United States) Kelsey Bone	To Phoenix Mercury: 2018 second-round pick (#26); 2019 second-round pick
February 7	To Seattle Storm: (United States) Natasha Howard	To Minnesota Lynx: 2018 second-round pick (#17); Right to swap 2019 first-round pick
March
March 6	To Minnesota Lynx: (United States) Danielle Robinson; 2019 second-round pick	To Phoenix Mercury: 2018 first-round pick (#12)
March 6	To Phoenix Mercury: (United States) Briann January	To Indiana Fever: 2018 first-round pick (#8)
April
April 12	To Connecticut Sun: (United States) Bria Holmes	To Atlanta Dream: 2018 second-round pick (#15); 2019 second-round pick
July
July 9	To Connecticut Sun: (United States) Layshia Clarendon; 2019 second-round pick	To Atlanta Dream: (Belarus) Alex Bentley
July 23	To Washington Mystics: (United States) Aerial Powers; 2019 second-round pick; Right to swap 2019 first-round pick	To Dallas Wings: (United States) Tayler Hill

=== Free agency ===
Player	Date signed	New team	Former team	Ref
(United States) Maggie Lucas	February 1	Atlanta Dream	Indiana Fever	
(United States) Renee Montgomery	February 1	Atlanta Dream	Minnesota Lynx	
(United States) Shekinna Stricklen	February 1	Connecticut Sun		
(United States) Kayla Thornton	February 1	Dallas Wings		
(United States) Carolyn Swords	February 1	Las Vegas Aces	Seattle Storm	
(United States) Tamera Young	February 1	Las Vegas Aces	Atlanta Dream	
(Serbia) Ana Dabović	February 1	Los Angeles Sparks		
(United Kingdom) Karlie Samuelson	February 1	Los Angeles Sparks		
(United States) Odyssey Sims	February 1	Los Angeles Sparks		
(United States) Rebekkah Brunson	February 1	Minnesota Lynx		
(Spain) Sancho Lyttle	February 1	Phoenix Mercury	Atlanta Dream	
(United States) Emma Cannon	February 1	Phoenix Mercury		
(United States) Yvonne Turner	February 1	Phoenix Mercury		
(Australia) Sami Whitcomb	February 1	Seattle Storm		
(United States) Monique Currie	February 1	Washington Mystics	Phoenix Mercury	
(United States) Jessica Breland	February 2	Atlanta Dream	Chicago Sky	
(Hungary) Allie Quigley	February 2	Chicago Sky		
(United States) Theresa Plaisance	February 2	Dallas Wings		
(United States) Courtney Paris	February 2	Seattle Storm	Dallas Wings	
(United States) Tianna Hawkins	February 2	Washington Mystics		
(United States) Allison Hightower	February 2	Washington Mystics		
(Turkey) LaToya Sanders	February 2	Washington Mystics		
(United States) Alaina Coates	February 5	Chicago Sky		
(United States) Jordan Hooper	February 5	Chicago Sky		
(United States) Alyssa Thomas	February 5	Connecticut Sun		
(Australia) Liz Cambage	February 5	Dallas Wings	Melbourne Boomers (Australia)	
(United States) Erica Wheeler	February 5	Indiana Fever		
(United States) Camille Little	February 5	Phoenix Mercury		
(Bulgaria) Noelle Quinn	February 5	Seattle Storm		
(Serbia) Aleksandra Crvendakić	February 5	Seattle Storm	Sopron Basket (Hungary)	
(United States) Devereaux Peters	February 5	Washington Mystics	Indiana Fever	
(United States) Asia Taylor	February 5	Washington Mystics		
(United States) Jennifer Hamson	February 6	Indiana Fever		
(United States) Jennie Simms	February 6	Indiana Fever		
(United States) Alana Beard	February 6	Los Angeles Sparks		
(United States) Jolene Anderson	February 6	Los Angeles Sparks		
(Canada) Saicha Grant-Allen	February 6	Los Angeles Sparks		
(Australia) Kelsey Griffin	February 7	Connecticut Sun	Bendigo Spirit (Australia)	
(United States) Betnijah Laney	February 7	Connecticut Sun	Bendigo Spirit (Australia)	
(Bosnia and Herzegovina) Lynetta Kizer	February 7	Minnesota Lynx	Connecticut Sun	
(France) Endéné Miyem	February 7	Minnesota Lynx	Famila Schio (Italy)	
(Italy) Cecilia Zandalasini	February 7	Minnesota Lynx		
(United States) Angel McCoughtry	February 8	Atlanta Dream		
(United States) Jeanette Pohlen-Mavunga	February 9	Indiana Fever		
(United States) Lindsay Allen	February 9	New York Liberty		
(Australia) Rebecca Allen	February 9	New York Liberty		
(United States) Bria Hartley	February 9	New York Liberty		
(Czech Republic) Kia Vaughn	February 9	New York Liberty		
(Nigeria) Adaora Elonu	February 13	Atlanta Dream	CB Avenida (Spain)	
(United States) Shenise Johnson	February 13	Indiana Fever		
(United States) DeWanna Bonner	February 13	Phoenix Mercury		
(Brazil) Damiris Dantas	February 14	Atlanta Dream		
(Belgium) Hind Ben Abdelkader	February 14	Indiana Fever	Hatay (Turkey)	
(United States) Cappie Pondexter	February 14	Los Angeles Sparks	Chicago Sky	
(United States) Stefanie Dolson	February 15	Chicago Sky		
(United States) Jamierra Faulkner	February 16	Chicago Sky		
(Canada) Adut Bulgak	February 20	Chicago Sky		
(United States) Alex Montgomery	February 20	Chicago Sky	San Antonio Stars	
(United States) Kelly Faris	February 20	New York Liberty	Connecticut Sun	
(United States) Ify Ibekwe	February 20	New York Liberty	Los Angeles Sparks	
(United States) Tiffany Jackson	February 21	Los Angeles Sparks		
(Spain) Astou Ndour	February 22	Chicago Sky		
(United States) Jillian Alleyne	February 22	New York Liberty	Phoenix Mercury	
(United States) Reshanda Gray	February 24	New York Liberty	Connecticut Sun	
(United States) Breanna Richardson	February 26	Minnesota Lynx		
(United States) Karima Christmas-Kelly	February 27	Dallas Wings		
(United States) Cierra Burdick	February 27	Las Vegas Aces		
(United States) Sequoia Holmes	February 27	Las Vegas Aces		
(United States) Ivey Slaughter	February 27	Las Vegas Aces	New York Liberty	
(United States) Kayla McBride	February 28	Las Vegas Aces		
(United States) Candice Dupree	March 6	Indiana Fever		
(United States) Crystal Langhorne	March 6	Seattle Storm		
(United States) Blake Dietrick	March 9	Atlanta Dream	Dafni Agiou Dimitriou (Greece)	
(United States) Sydney Colson	March 13	Las Vegas Aces		
(United States) Tanisha Wright	March 13	Minnesota Lynx	New York Liberty	
(France) Valériane Ayayi	March 19	Las Vegas Aces		
(United States) Jessica January	March 22	Connecticut Sun		
(United States) Alex Harden	March 22	Phoenix Mercury		
(United States) Ameryst Alston	March 27	Chicago Sky	New York Liberty	
(Belarus) Yelena Leuchanka	April 5	Atlanta Dream	Homenetmen Antelias (Lebanon)	
(United States) Tina Charles	April 6	New York Liberty		
(United States) Rachel Hollivay	April 10	New York Liberty	Atlanta Dream	
(United States) Shay Murphy	April 10	New York Liberty	San Antonio Stars	
(Greece) Jacki Gemelos	April 11	Las Vegas Aces	Napoli (Italy)	
(United States) Alexa Hart	April 13	Atlanta Dream	Ohio State	
(United States) Rosemarie Julien	April 13	Atlanta Dream	Florida Gulf Coast	
(United States) Linnae Harper	April 13	Chicago Sky	Ohio State	
(United States) Morgan William	April 14	Las Vegas Aces	Mississippi State	
(United States) Chelsea Hopkins	April 16	Chicago Sky	Atlanta Dream	
(United States) Brittany McPhee	April 16	Seattle Storm	Stanford	
(United States) AJ Alix	April 16	Washington Mystics	Florida State	
(United States) Lexi Bando	April 17	Los Angeles Sparks	Oregon	
(United States) Mistie Bass	April 17	Los Angeles Sparks	Canberra Capitals (Australia)	
(United States) Brooke McCarty	April 17	Los Angeles Sparks	Texas	
(United States) Gabbi Ortiz	April 17	Los Angeles Sparks	Oklahoma	
(United States) G'mrice Davis	April 17	Minnesota Lynx	Fordham	
(United States) Vionise Pierre-Louis	April 17	Minnesota Lynx	Oklahoma	
(United States) Camille Zimmerman	April 17	Minnesota Lynx	Columbia	
(United States) Tanaya Atkinson	April 17	Washington Mystics	Temple	
(United States) Tinara Moore	April 17	Washington Mystics	Central Michigan	
(United States) Brooke Johnson	April 18	Las Vegas Aces	UNLV	
(United States) Kaylee Jensen	April 18	Los Angeles Sparks	Oklahoma State	
(United States) Jessica Lindstrom	April 18	Los Angeles Sparks	Green Bay	
(United States) Chelsea Nelson	April 18	Phoenix Mercury	North Carolina State	
(United States) Khaalia Hillsman	April 18	Seattle Storm	Texas A&M	
(Canada) Emily Potter	April 18	Seattle Storm	Utah	
(United States) Chatrice White	April 19	Phoenix Mercury	Florida State	
(United States) Bashaara Graves	April 20	Indiana Fever	Chicago Sky	
(United States) Tashia Brown	April 20	New York Liberty	Western Kentucky	
(United States) Roshunda Johnson	April 20	New York Liberty	Mississippi State	
(United States) Kolby Morgan	April 20	New York Liberty	Tulane	
(United States) Amber Harris	April 23	Chicago Sky		
(United States) Khadijiah Cave	April 23	Connecticut Sun	Baylor	
(United States) Nikki Greene	April 23	Connecticut Sun		
(United States) Tyra Buss	April 24	Connecticut Sun	Indiana	
(United States) Alexis Peterson	April 25	Indiana Fever	Seattle Storm	
(United States) Shoni Schimmel	April 27	New York Liberty		
(United States) Taya Reimer	April 28	Los Angeles Sparks	Michigan State	
(United States) Kathryn Westbeld	April 28	Los Angeles Sparks	Notre Dame	
(United States) Marissa Coleman	May 1	New York Liberty	Indiana Fever	
(United States) Renee Bennett	May 3	Chicago Sky	Valencia Basket	
(United States) Jillian Alleyne	May 6	Minnesota Lynx	New York Liberty	
(United States) Shoni Schimmel	May 15	Las Vegas Aces	New York Liberty	
(United States) Lindsay Allen	May 19	Las Vegas Aces (claimed off waivers)	New York Liberty (waived on May 19)	
(United Kingdom) Karlie Samuelson	May 19	Los Angeles Sparks		
(United States) Mercedes Russell	May 20	New York Liberty		
(United States) Angel Robinson	May 29	Phoenix Mercury		
(United States) Mercedes Russell	May 30	Seattle Storm	New York Liberty	
(Spain) Leticia Romero	May 31	Dallas Wings	Connecticut Sun	
(Australia) Cayla George	June 3	Dallas Wings	Connecticut Sun	
(France) Endy Miyem	June 6	Minnesota Lynx (Previously waived on May 17, 2018)		
(United States) Sequoia Holmes	June 8	Las Vegas Aces		
(United States) Teana Muldrow	June 12	Dallas Wings	Seattle Storm	
(United States) Asia Taylor	June 17	Indiana Fever	Washington Mystics	
(United Kingdom) Karlie Samuelson	June 24	Los Angeles Sparks (Previously waived on May 28, 2018)		
(United States) Cappie Pondexter	July 1	Indiana Fever	Los Angeles Sparks	
(United States) Alexis Prince	July 4	Atlanta Dream (7-day contract)	Phoenix Mercury (waived on May 14)	
(United States) Linnae Harper	July 4	Chicago Sky (7-day contract, previously waived on July 1, 2018)		
(United States) Lynetta Kizer	July 5	Minnesota Lynx (7-day contract, previously waived on July 1, 2018)		
(United States) Alexis Prince	July 11	Atlanta Dream (second 7-day contract)		
(United States) Linnae Harper	July 11	Chicago Sky (second 7-day contract)		
(United States) Amber Harris	July 11	Chicago Sky (7-day contract, previously waived on May 2, 2018)		
(United States) Erlana Larkins	July 12	Minnesota Lynx (7-day contract)	Indiana Fever (waived on May 17)	
(United States) Alexis Prince	July 18	Atlanta Dream (third 7-day contract)		
(United States) Linnae Harper	July 18	Chicago Sky (third 7-day contract)		
(United States) Erlana Larkins	July 19	Minnesota Lynx (second 7-day contract)		
(United States) Alexis Prince	July 25	Atlanta Dream (Signed for rest of season)		
(United States) Linnae Harper	July 25	Chicago Sky (Signed for rest of season)		
(United States) Devereaux Peters	July 29	Phoenix Mercury (7-day contract)	Washington Mystics (waived on May 17)	
(United States) Erlana Larkins	July 30	Minnesota Lynx (Signed for rest of reason)		
(United States) Devereaux Peters	August 5	Phoenix Mercury (second 7-day contract)		
(Nigeria) Adaora Elonu	August 10	Atlanta Dream (7-day contract, previously waived on May 17, 2018)		
(United States) Devereaux Peters	August 12	Phoenix Mercury (Signed for rest of season)		
(United States) Sydney Colson	August 14	Minnesota Lynx (Signed for rest of season)	Las Vegas Aces (waived on May 17)	
(Nigeria) Adaora Elonu	August 10	Atlanta Dream (Signed for rest of season)		
(United States) Maggie Lucas	August 19	Dallas Wings (Signed for rest of season)	Atlanta Dream (waived on June 30)	

=== Waived ===
Player	Date Waived	Former Team	Ref
(United States) Lanay Montgomery	March 24	Seattle Storm	
(United States) Ify Ibekwe	April 10	New York Liberty	
(Belarus) Yelena Leuchanka	April 13	Atlanta Dream	
(United States) Alexis Peterson	April 17	Seattle Storm	
(Australia) Kelsey Griffin	April 24	Connecticut Sun	
(United States) Marissa Coleman	April 25	Indiana Fever	
(United States) Tyler Scaife	April 26	Phoenix Mercury	
(Senegal) Maimouna Diarra	April 27	Los Angeles Sparks	
(Canada) Saicha Grant-Allen	April 27	Los Angeles Sparks	
(United States) Tiffany Jackson	April 27	Los Angeles Sparks	
(United States) Raigyne Louis	May 23	Las Vegas Aces	
(United States) Shoni Schimmel	May 23	Las Vegas Aces	
(United States) Mercedes Russell	May 26	New York Liberty	
(Canada) Adut Bulgak	May 27	Chicago Sky	
(United States) Chelsea Hopkins	May 27	Chicago Sky	
(United Kingdom) Karlie Samuelson	May 28	Los Angeles Sparks	
(United States) Imani Wright	May 28	Phoenix Mercury	
(United States) Teana Muldrow	May 30	Seattle Storm	
(United States) Saniya Chong	May 31	Dallas Wings	
(United States) Breanna Lewis	June 3	Dallas Wings	
(United States) Sequoia Holmes	June 15	Las Vegas Aces	
(Puerto Rico) Jazmon Gwathmey	June 17	Indiana Fever	
(United States) Cappie Pondexter	June 28	Los Angeles Sparks	
(United States) Teana Muldrow	June 29	Dallas Wings	
(United States) Maggie Lucas	June 30	Atlanta Dream	
(Belgium) Hind Ben Abdelkader	June 30	Indiana Fever	
(United States) Lynetta Kizer	June 30	Minnesota Lynx	
(United States) Linnae Harper	July 1	Chicago Sky	
(France) Endy Miyem	August 13	Minnesota Lynx	

==== Training camp cuts ====
All players listed did not make the final roster.

Atlanta Dream	Chicago Sky	Connecticut Sun	Dallas Wings
Adaora Elonu; Mackenzie Engram; Alexa Hart; Rosemarie Julien	Ameryst Alston; Renee Bennett; Amarah Coleman; Makayla Epps; Amber Harris; Jordan Hooper	Tyra Buss; Khadijiah Cave; Mikayla Cowling; Cayla George; Nikki Greene; Jessica January; Kayla Pedersen; Leticia Romero	Evelyn Akhator; Natalie Butler; Loryn Goodwin; Ruth Hamblin
Indiana Fever	Las Vegas Aces	Los Angeles Sparks	Minnesota Lynx
Bashaara Graves; Jennifer Hamson; Erlana Larkins; Alexis Peterson; Jeanette Pohlen-Mavunga; Jennie Simms	Valériane Ayayi; Cierra Burdick; Sydney Colson; Jacki Gemelos; Sequoia Holmes; Brooke Johnson; Khalia Lawrence; Ivey Slaughter; Morgan William	Jolene Anderson; Lexi Bando; Mistie Bass; Kaylee Jensen; Jessica Lindstrom; Brooke McCarty; Taya Reimer; Karlie Samuelson; Shakayla Thomas; Kathryn Westbeld	Jillian Alleyne; Jill Barta; G'mrice Davis; Endy Miyem; Vionise Pierre-Louis; Breanna Richardson; Carlie Wagner; Camille Zimmerman
New York Liberty	Phoenix Mercury	Seattle Storm	Washington Mystics
Lindsay Allen; Jillian Alleyne; Tashia Brown; Kelly Faris; Reshanda Gray; Rachel Hollivay; Roshunda Johnson; Kolby Morgan; Shay Murphy; Leslie Robinson; Mercedes Russell; Shoni Schimmel	Emma Cannon; Alex Harden; Raisa Musina; Chelsea Nelson; Alexis Prince; Angel Robinson; Chatrice White	Aleksandra Crvendakic; Khaalia Hillsman; Brittany McPhee; Emily Potter	AJ Alix; Tanaya Atkinson; Allison Hightower; Ivory Latta; Tinara Moore; Devereaux Peters; Asia Taylor

== Draft ==
=== First round ===
Pick	Player	Date signed	Team	Ref
1	(United States) A'ja Wilson	April 18	Las Vegas Aces	
2	(United States) Kelsey Mitchell	April 17	Indiana Fever	
3	(United States) Diamond DeShields	April 17	Chicago Sky	
4	(United States) Gabby Williams	April 20	Chicago Sky	
5	(United States) Jordin Canada	April 17	Seattle Storm	
6	(United States) Azurá Stevens	April 19	Dallas Wings	
7	(United States) Ariel Atkins	April 16	Washington Mystics	
8	(United States) Victoria Vivians	April 23	Indiana Fever	
9	(United States) Lexie Brown	April 16	Connecticut Sun	
10	(Canada) Kia Nurse	April 20	New York Liberty	
11	(Russia) Maria Vadeeva	April 17	Los Angeles Sparks	
12	(Germany) Marie Gülich	April 20	Phoenix Mercury	

=== Second round ===
Pick	Player	Date signed	Team	Ref
13	(United States) Jaime Nared	April 17	Las Vegas Aces	
14	(United States) Stephanie Mavunga	April 17	Indiana Fever	
15	(United States) Monique Billings	April 19	Atlanta Dream	
16	(Australia) Kristy Wallace	—	Atlanta Dream	
17	(South Korea) Park Ji-su	April 17	Minnesota Lynx	
18	(United States) Loryn Goodwin	April 16	Dallas Wings	
19	(United States) Myisha Hines-Allen	April 16	Washington Mystics	
20	(United States) Tyler Scaife	April 17	Phoenix Mercury	
21	(Russia) Raisa Musina	April 26	Phoenix Mercury	
22	(United States) Mercedes Russell	April 23	New York Liberty	
23	(United States) Shakayla Thomas	April 18	Los Angeles Sparks	
24	(United States) Kahlia Lawrence	April 18	Minnesota Lynx	

=== Third round ===
Pick	Player	Date signed	Team	Ref
25	(United States) Raigyne Louis	April 17	Las Vegas Aces	
26	(United States) Imani Wright	April 17	Phoenix Mercury	
27	(United States) Mackenzie Engram	April 18	Atlanta Dream	
28	(United States) Amarah Coleman	April 17	Chicago Sky	
29	(United States) Teana Muldrow	April 17	Seattle Storm	
30	(United States) Natalie Butler	April 16	Dallas Wings	
31	(United States) Rebecca Greenwell	April 17	Washington Mystics	
32	(United States) Jill Barta	April 17	Las Vegas Aces	
33	(United States) Mikayla Cowling	April 17	Connecticut Sun	
34	(United States) Leslie Robinson	April 20	New York Liberty	
35	(Czech Republic) Julia Reisingerova	—	Los Angeles Sparks	
36	(United States) Carlie Wagner	April 17	Minnesota Lynx	

=== Previous years' draftees ===
Draft	Pick	Player	Date signed	Team	Previous team	Ref
2017	16	(Spain) Leticia Romero	February 7	Connecticut Sun	USK Praha (Czech Republic)	
