= Brooke McCarty-Williams =

American basketball player (born 1995)

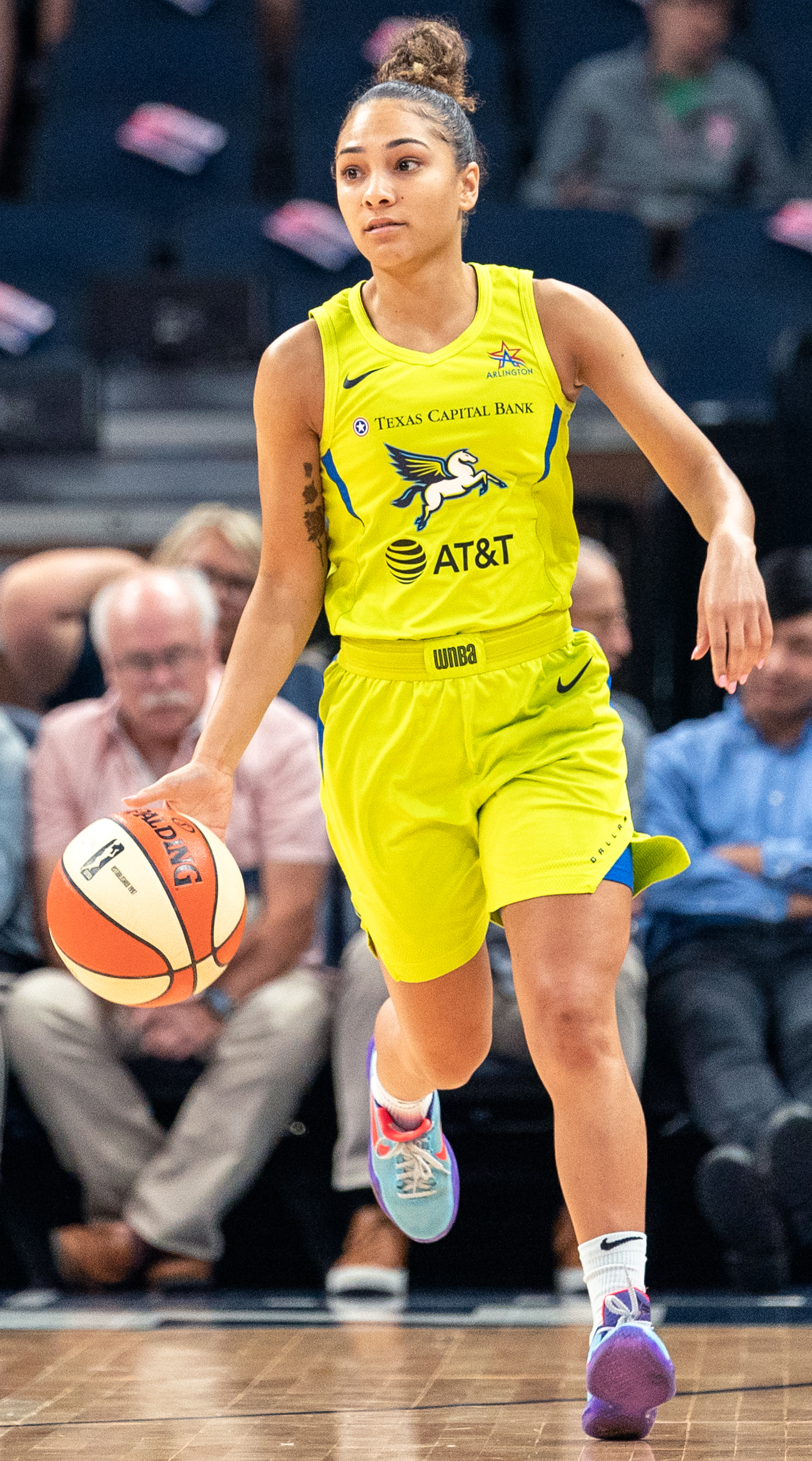
- McCarty-Williams in 2019

Personal information
- Born: October 2, 1995 (age 31) Madisonville, Texas, U.S.
- Listed height: 5 ft 4 in (1.63 m)

Career information
- High school: Clear Springs (League City, Texas)
- College: Texas (2014–2018)
- WNBA draft: 2018: undrafted
- Playing career: 2018–2019
- Position: Point guard / shooting guard
- Number: 1

Career history
- 2019: Dallas Wings

Career highlights
- Big 12 Player of the Year (2017); 3× First-team All-Big 12 (2016–2018); Big 12 All-Freshman Team (2015); McDonald's All-American (2014)

Career WNBA statistics
- Points: 81 (2.4 ppg)
- Rebounds: 45 (1.3 rpg)
- Assists: 64 (1.9 apg)
- Stats at WNBA.com
- Stats at Basketball Reference

Brooke Michelle McCarty-Williams (born October 2, 1995) is an American former professional basketball player who played for the Dallas Wings of the Women's National Basketball Association (WNBA). She currently plays for Luleå Basket in the Swedish Basketball League.

== College career ==
McCarty-Williams starred for Texas as soon as she arrived on campus, making the Big 12 All-Freshman team in her first year, 2015. She continued on to make the All Big 12 First Team in each of the next three seasons. In 2018, her senior year, she was also a USA Today Third Team All-American, and a AP All American Honorable Mention. She was also named to the Big 12 Tournament team in her senior season. In total, she played in 139 games for the Longhorns, scoring 1,619 points.

=== Texas statistics ===
Legend
GP	Games played	GS	Games started	MPG	Minutes per game
FG%	Field goal percentage	3P%	3-point field goal percentage	FT%	Free throw percentage
RPG	Rebounds per game	APG	Assists per game	SPG	Steals per game
BPG	Blocks per game	PPG	Points per game	**Bold**	Career high

Year	Team	GP	Points	FG%	3P%	FT%	RPG	APG	SPG	BPG	PPG
2014–15	Texas	35	250	38.2%	34.3%	78.0%	2.6	1.5	0.9	0.2	7.1
2015–16	Texas	**36**	424	45.6%	41.1%	71.6%	2.8	2.5	1.2	**0.2**	11.8
2016–17	Texas	34	**481**	**45.7%**	**43.0%**	76.7%	3.6	3.6	0.8	0.1	**14.1**
2017–18	Texas	34	464	42.5%	38.6%	**88.9%**	**4.5**	**4.4**	**1.5**	0.1	13.6
Career		139	1619	43.4%	39.8%	78.5%	3.3	3.0	1.1	0.1	11.6

== WNBA career ==
McCarty-Williams was undrafted in the 2018 WNBA draft. She participated in training camp with the Los Angeles Sparks, but was ultimately cut from the roster. In the following year, 2019, McCarty-Williams participated in training camp with the Dallas Wings, and made the roster. She made her WNBA debut on May 24, 2019 vs. the Atlanta Dream. She played 29 minutes, and scored 8 points in a 72–76 loss.

== Career statistics ==
Legend
GP	Games played	GS	Games started	MPG	Minutes per game	RPG	Rebounds per game
APG	Assists per game	SPG	Steals per game	BPG	Blocks per game	PPG	Points per game
TO	Turnovers per game	FG%	Field-goal percentage	3P%	3-point field-goal percentage	FT%	Free-throw percentage
**Bold**	Career best	°	League leader

=== WNBA ===
Year	Team	GP	GS	MPG	FG%	3P%	FT%	RPG	APG	SPG	BPG	TO	PPG
2019	Dallas	34	3	13.1	.289	.360	.971	1.3	1.9	0.4	0.0	0.8	2.4

== Personal life ==
McCarty-Williams is married to Kamron Williams, an officer in the All-Volunteer Force of the U.S. Navy.
