= Raigyne Louis =

American basketball player (born 1994)

Personal information
- Born: September 3, 1994 (age 32) Fort Lauderdale, Florida, U.S.
- Listed height: 5 ft 10 in (1.78 m)

Career information
- High school: American Heritage (Plantation & Delray Beach)
- College: LSU (2013–2018)
- WNBA draft: 2018: 3rd round, 25th overall pick
- Drafted by: Las Vegas Aces
- Playing career: 2018–present
- Position: Guard

Career history
- 2018: Las Vegas Aces

Career highlights
- All-SEC First Team (2018); SEC Defensive Player of the Year (2017); All-SEC Second Team (2017); 2x SEC All-Defensive Team (2017, 2018); All-SEC Freshman Team (2014)
- Stats at Basketball Reference

Raigyne Louis (born September 3, 1994) is an American professional basketball player. She was drafted by the Las Vegas Aces in the 2018 WNBA draft. She played college basketball at LSU.

== College career ==
Louis came out of high school as the 18th overall ranked recruit per ESPN's HoopGurlz Top 100. She was the 6th overall guard in the class, as well. Louis committed to LSU after also taking official visits to Miami, Oklahoma, and South Carolina. Louis became the highest guard signed by LSU since Allison Hightower in 2006.

Louis was named to the SEC All-Freshman team during her first season in Baton Rouge. During the 2016–2017 season, Louis had one of her best season for the Tigers. She was named to the All-SEC 2nd Team, All-Defensive Team, and was named the conference's Defensive Player of the Year. She finished off her career at LSU by making the All-SEC 1st Team.

== College statistics ==
Year	Team	GP	Points	FG%	3P%	FT%	RPG	APG	SPG	BPG	PPG
2013–14	LSU	31	312	.427	.000	.703	4.5	2.1	1.8	0.4	10.1
2014–15	LSU	31	365	.388	.167	.661	6.7	2.5	1.9	0.5	11.8
2015–16	LSU	3	31	.267	.000	.583	7.0	3.7	2.7	0.3	10.3
2016–17	LSU	32	507	.406	.167	.698	5.9	2.9	3.3	0.8	15.8
2016–17	LSU	29	466	.431	.313	.619	5.8	3.9	2.3	0.2	16.1
Career		126	1681	.408	.260	.672	5.8	2.8	2.4	0.5	13.3

== Professional career ==
=== Las Vegas Aces ===
Louis was drafted in the 3rd Round of the 2018 WNBA draft by the Las Vegas Aces. Louis will be the third player under LSU coach Nikki Fargas to play in the WNBA. Louis impressed Head Coach Bill Laimbeer with her defensive intensity during training camp. Laimbeer stated that "she was probably the best defender we have in camp." Louis made the Aces's opening night roster, but was waived later in May to make room for players returning from their overseas commitments.

== WNBA career statistics ==
Legend
GP	Games played	GS	Games started	MPG	Minutes per game	RPG	Rebounds per game
APG	Assists per game	SPG	Steals per game	BPG	Blocks per game	PPG	Points per game
TO	Turnovers per game	FG%	Field-goal percentage	3P%	3-point field-goal percentage	FT%	Free-throw percentage
**Bold**	Career best	°	League leader

=== Regular season ===
Year	Team	GP	GS	MPG	FG%	3P%	FT%	RPG	APG	SPG	BPG	TO	PPG
2018	Las Vegas	2	0	10.5	.400	.000	.667	2.0	0.5	0.5	0.0	2.0	3.0
Career	1 year, 1 team	2	0	10.5	.400	.000	.667	2.0	0.5	0.5	0.0	2.0	3.0

== Personal life ==
Louis married LSU football player Lamar Louis in July 2017.
