= Teana Muldrow =

American basketball player (born 1995)

Personal information
- Born: December 16, 1995 (age 30) East Orange, New Jersey, U.S.
- Listed height: 6 ft 1 in (1.85 m)

Career information
- High school: East Orange High School (East Orange, New Jersey)
- College: West Virginia (2013–2018)
- WNBA draft: 2018: 3rd round, 29th overall pick
- Drafted by: Seattle Storm
- Playing career: 2018–present
- Position: Guard

Career history
- 2018: Seattle Storm
- 2018: Dallas Wings
- 2021-2022: Landerneau Bretagne Basket
- 2023-2023: Hapoel Petah Tikva
- 2023: Panteras de Aguascalientes Femenil
- 2024-present: Shanxi Flame

Career highlights
- All-Big 12 First Team (2018)
- Stats at Basketball Reference

Teana Muldrow (born December 16, 1995) is an American professional basketball player. She was drafted by the Seattle Storm in the 2018 WNBA draft and played for the Storm and the Dallas Wings in her career. She played college basketball at West Virginia.

== College career ==
Muldrow came out of high school as the 34th overall rated recruit per the 2013 ESPN HoopGurlz rankings. Muldrow signed to play her college basketball at West Virginia. Head coach Mike Carey stated that they were "excited about her because she can shoot the three, go inside and can play multiple positions."

Muldrow redshirted her first year in Morgantown, but went on to average double figures in the final three years of her career. As a junior, Muldrow was named to the Big 12 Conference Honorable Mention team, as well as being named to the Big 12 All-Tournament Team. During her senior season, Muldrow was named to the First Team. Muldrow finished her career at WVU with over 1,800 points and 900 rebounds.

== College statistics ==
Year	Team	GP	Points	FG%	3P%	FT%	RPG	APG	SPG	BPG	PPG
2013–14	West Virginia	Redshirted									
2014–15	West Virginia	38	262	.347	.299	.511	4.1	0.8	0.6	0.5	6.9
2015–16	West Virginia	33	350	.496	.453	.648	5.9	1.3	1.3	1.0	10.6
2016–17	West Virginia	35	508	.482	.372	.782	8.5	2.5	1.3	1.1	14.5
2017–18	West Virginia	37	508	.505	.331	.822	8.4	1.9	1.5	1.4	18.8
Career		143	1817	.467	.351	.739	6.7	1.6	1.2	1.0	12.7

== WNBA career ==
=== Seattle Storm ===
Muldrow was drafted 29th overall in the Third Round of the 2018 WNBA draft by the Seattle Storm. Muldrow made the Opening Night roster for the Storm and appeared in three games before being waived on May 30, 2018.

=== Dallas Wings ===
Muldrow signed with the Dallas Wings in June 2018, after the Wings were granted a roster hardship exemption. Muldrow appears in 1 game for the Wings before being waived.

=== Training Camp Invites ===
Muldrow returned to Seattle in 2019 on a training camp contract, butt was waived again during camp and did not make the Storm roster.

Muldrow signed a training camp contract with the Connecticut Sun in 2021, but once again was waived.

== WNBA career statistics ==
Legend
GP	Games played	GS	Games started	MPG	Minutes per game	RPG	Rebounds per game
APG	Assists per game	SPG	Steals per game	BPG	Blocks per game	PPG	Points per game
TO	Turnovers per game	FG%	Field-goal percentage	3P%	3-point field-goal percentage	FT%	Free-throw percentage
**Bold**	Career best	°	League leader

=== Regular season ===
Year	Team	GP	GS	MPG	FG%	3P%	FT%	RPG	APG	SPG	BPG	TO	PPG
2018	Seattle	3	0	2.0	.000	.000	.000	0.3	0.0	0.0	0.0	0.0	0.0
2018	Dallas	1	0	3.0	.000	.000	.000	0.0	0.0	0.0	0.0	0.0	0.0
Career	1 year, 2 teams	4	0	2.3	.000	.000	0.3	0.0	0.0	0.0	0.0	0.0	
