= Imani Wright =

American basketball player (born 1995)

Personal information
- Born: February 5, 1995 (age 31) Talladega, Alabama, U.S.
- Listed height: 5 ft 9 in (1.75 m)

Career information
- High school: Liberty-Eylau High School (Texarkana, Texas)
- College: Baylor (2013–2014); Florida State (2015–2018)
- WNBA draft: 2018: 3rd round, 26th overall pick
- Drafted by: Phoenix Mercury
- Playing career: 2018–present
- Position: Guard

Career history

Playing
- 2018: Phoenix Mercury
- 2018-2019: Femeni Sant Adria

Coaching
- 2019-2020: Pittsburgh (Ast. DOBO)

Career highlights
- AP Honorable Mention All-American (2018); WBCA Honorable Mention All-American (2018); All-ACC First Team (2018); All-Big 12 Conference Honorable Mention (2015)
- Stats at Basketball Reference

Imani Wright (born February 6, 1995) is a former American professional basketball player. She was drafted and played one season with the Phoenix Mercury in the WNBA during the 2018 WNBA season. She played college basketball at Florida State and Baylor.

== College career ==
Wright came out of high school as the 31st overall ranked recruit per ESPN HoopGurlz Top 100. Wright committed to Baylor and joined the 20th ranked incoming freshman class. Wright spent the first two years of her college career with the Lady Bears. During her sophomore season with Baylor, Wright became the starter and led the team in 3-pointers made for the year. Following her sophomore season, Wright decided that she would leave Baylor and transfer.

Wright transferred to Florida State and had two years of eligibility remaining. She had to sit out 2015–2016 season due to the NCAA Transfer rules. During the two years she did play for the Seminoles, Wright continued to shoot lights out, as she recorded an FSU single-season record with 103 made 3-pointers during her redshirt senior season. For the 2017–2018 season, Wright was named to the All-ACC First Team by both the Coaches and Media, as well as being named an AP Honorable Mention All-American.

== College statistics ==
Year	Team	GP	Points	FG%	3P%	FT%	RPG	APG	SPG	BPG	PPG
2013–14	Baylor	37	195	.290	.276	.811	1.7	0.7	0.4	0.2	5.3
2014–15	Baylor	37	349	.389	.316	.734	3.2	2.5	0.9	0.2	9.4
2015–16	Florida State	Redshirted - NCAA Transfer									
2016–17	Florida State	35	375	.392	.378	.690	2.2	1.2	1.0	0.1	10.7
2017–18	Florida State	32	523	.407	.383	.724	2.9	2.2	0.9	0.1	16.3
Career		141	1442	.380	.349	.736	2.5	1.6	0.8	0.2	10.2

== WNBA career ==
=== Phoenix Mercury ===
Wright was selected 26th overall in the Third Round of the 2018 WNBA draft by the Phoenix Mercury. Wright made it through training camp and made the Opening Night roster for the Mercury. Wright made her WNBA debut on May 23, 2018, when the Mercury played the Seattle Storm. Wright recorded 1 minute of action and attempted 1 3-pointer. Wright was waived a few days later from the Mercury.

== WNBA career statistics ==
Legend
GP	Games played	GS	Games started	MPG	Minutes per game	RPG	Rebounds per game
APG	Assists per game	SPG	Steals per game	BPG	Blocks per game	PPG	Points per game
TO	Turnovers per game	FG%	Field-goal percentage	3P%	3-point field-goal percentage	FT%	Free-throw percentage
**Bold**	Career best	°	League leader

=== Regular season ===
Year	Team	GP	GS	MPG	FG%	3P%	FT%	RPG	APG	SPG	BPG	TO	PPG
2018	Phoenix	1	0	1.0	.000	.000	.000	0.0	0.0	0.0	0.0	0.0	0.0
Career	1 year, 1 team	1	0	1.0	.000	.000	.000	0.0	0.0	0.0	0.0	0.0	0.0

== Coaching career ==
Wright joined the staff of the Pittsburgh Panthers women's basketball team as the assistant director of Basketball Operations for the 2019–2020 season. She spent one season with the Panthers.

== Personal life ==
Wright's dad is Larry Wright who was drafted 14th overall in the 1976 NBA draft. Wright is also cousins with Matt Forte, who played in the NFL for the Chicago Bears and New York Jets.
