= Carlie Wagner =

American basketball player

Personal information
- Born: May 16, 1995 (age 31) New Richland, Minnesota
- Listed height: 5 ft 10 in (1.78 m)
- Listed weight: 155 lb (70 kg)

Career information
- College: University of Minnesota
- WNBA draft: 2018: 3rd round, 36th overall pick
- Drafted by: Minnesota Lynx
- Position: Guard
- Number: 24

Career highlights
- First-team All-Big Ten (2018); Big Ten All-Freshman Team (2015); Minnesota Miss Basketball (2014)
- Stats at WNBA.com
- Stats at Basketball Reference

Carlie Wagner (born May 16, 1995) is an American basketball guard who was drafted in the 3rd Round of the 2018 WNBA draft by the Minnesota Lynx of the Women's National Basketball Association (WNBA).

== Career statistics ==
=== College ===
Year	Team	GP	GS	MPG	FG%	3P%	FT%	RPG	APG	SPG	BPG	TO	PPG
2014–15	Minnesota	32	27	32.2	37.6	32.8	79.5	3.4	2.4	0.8	0.2	1.6	12.0
2015–16	Minnesota	32	32	37.8	37.9	33.0	79.7	5.2	2.6	0.9	0.0	2.8	18.9
2016–17	Minnesota	31	31	36.0	36.5	31.4	77.0	5.2	1.6	1.2	0.2	2.7	19.1
2017–18	Minnesota	33	33	35.2	43.2	41.2	79.7	4.6	2.4	1.4	0.2	2.3	18.7
Career		128	123	35.3	38.8	34.8	78.8	4.6	2.2	1.1	0.1	2.3	17.2
Statistics retrieved from Sports-Reference.
