= Leslie Robinson =

English footballer

Personal information
- Date of birth: 2 May 1898
- Place of birth: Romford, England
- Date of death: 1965 (aged 67)
- Place of death: Barking, England
- Position: Inside right

Senior career*
Years	Team	Apps	(Gls)
- Stirling Athletic
1921–1924	West Ham United	19	(2)
1924–1927	Northampton Town	73	(32)
1927–1928	Norwich City	31	(10)
1928–1929	Thames		
1929–1930	Torquay United	23	(16)
- * Club domestic league appearances and goals

Leslie Robinson (2 May 1898 – 1965) was an English footballer who played as a inside right.

== Career ==
Robinson began his career at non-league club Stirling Athletic, after serving for the Essex Regiment in World War I. Robinson signed for West Ham United in the 1920–21 season. Robinson's time at West Ham was spent between the first team and the reserves, making 19 Football League appearances, scoring twice. In 1924, Robinson signed for Northampton Town, scoring 32 times in 73 appearances. In June 1927, Robinson joined Norwich City, making 31 appearances, scoring ten times. The following year, Robinson moved back to east London, signing for newly formed Thames. Robinson only stayed at the club for one season, signing for Torquay United in July 1929. Robinson scored 16 times in 23 appearances for the club.
