= Camille Zimmerman =

American basketball player

Personal information
- Born: December 22, 1995 (age 29) Tempe, Arizona, U.S.
- Listed height: 6 ft 1 in (1.85 m)

Career information
- High school: Tempe Preparatory Academy
- College: Columbia University
- Position: Guard/forward

Career history
- 2018: Minnesota Lynx
- 2018–?: Kouvottaret
- 2023–present: USO Mondeville

Career highlights
- 2x First-team All-Ivy (2017, 2018)
Medals
Women's 3x3 basketball
Representing the United States
FIBA 3x3 AmeriCup
Gold medal – first place	2023 San Juan	Team
FIBA 3x3 AmeriCup
Bronze medal – third place	2022 Miami	Team

Camille Kathleen Zimmerman (born December 22, 1995) is an American basketball player currently playing for USO Mondeville in the Ligue Féminine de Basketball. She attended Columbia University in New York City 2014 to 2018. She was named one of the top college women's basketball players in the country as an upperclassman, a leader in the Ivy League in rebounding and scoring, and ranked 10th nationally in points scored in 2016–17.

She holds the men's and women's all-time scoring record and the women's all-time rebounding record at Columbia University. She is fourth on the Ivy League's all-time scoring list. Her senior year, she was a top-ten finalist for the Katrina McClain Award. Zimmerman signed a professional contract with the Minnesota Lynx at the end of her senior year.

Zimmerman then signed a professional contract with Kouvottaret in Finland. Kouvottaret is a club team in Naisten Korisliiga, the premier women's basketball league of Finland. In her rookie year, she has established herself as a scorer and rebounder once again, averaging 18.8 ppg, 8.7 rpg and 3 apg., and helping her team to reach the Finland Final Four.

== Early life ==
Zimmerman was born in Tempe, Arizona to Maureen Zimmerman, Registered Dietitian Nutritionist and a nutrition professor at Mesa Community College, and Jeffrey Zimmerman, a small-business owner. She has two sisters and two brothers. In Camille's early life she played club soccer and started playing basketball at the local YMCA.

== High school ==
Camille attended Tempe Preparatory Academy, where she was two-time captain and Division IV women's basketball state champion in 2011–12, her sophomore year.

In her senior year, she was rated as their #3 overall prospect in Arizona's 2014 class. After several recruiting visits to Division I universities, she chose to attend Columbia University in New York City, an Ivy League school. She was named Arizona's Small School Player of the Year in 2014.

== College career ==
Camille attended Columbia University in New York City (class of 2018) majoring in economics.

On April 26, 2017, Camille received the All-Met Division I women's college basketball Player of the Year award from the Met Basketball Writers Association (MBWA). She is the first women's player from Columbia to receive the award.

In her record-breaking junior year, she led the Ivy League in seven categories, ranking among the top 50 nationally and setting season records for Columbia, making her one of the school's top all-time scorers. She scored double digits in every game of the 2016–17 season and became the seventh player in Ivy League women's basketball to score at least 600 points in one season, making her the sixth on the full list with 608 points.

That same season, Camille was simultaneously named the U.S. Basketball Writers Association's (USBWA) Ann Myers Drysdale National Player of the Week while also being featured on the NCAA's Starting Five Players of the Week.

Following her junior year, Camille was named First team All-Ivy League, the sixth player in the program's history.

During her senior year, Zimmerman averaged 19.5 points and 10.2 rebounds, including a conference-best 18.9 points and 11.6 rebounds across the 14-game league schedule. She also led the Ancient Eight with 565 total points, 295 rebounds, 17 double-doubles, 204 field goals, 142 free throws and 112 offensive rebounds. Her .866 mark at the free throw line and 36.0 minutes per game were second in the league, while her .445 percentage from the field was fifth. She also ranked among the Ivy's top-10 in assists (3.3) and blocks (0.8).

Among her many highlights her senior season, Zimmerman posted the first 20–20 game by a Lion in nearly eight years when she scored 22 points and grabbed a career-high 24 rebounds in mid-February against Brown. Her 24 rebounds were the most in a game by an Ivy League player this season and tie for the fourth-most in the NCAA. A week earlier, she scored a season-high 31 points on 10-of-19 shooting, 3-of-3 from deep and 8-of-8 from the free throw line at Harvard. She was a Katrina McClain Award Top-10 Finalist, also going for 26 points and 12 rebounds against reigning national runner-up Mississippi State at the Cancun Challenge.

During her senior campaign, she broke many records at Columbia, including the single season scoring record and the all-time scoring and rebounding records (men's and women's).

Zimmerman concluded her four-year, 113-game career with 1,973 points and 940 rebounds. She is Columbia's career record holder in six categories: scoring, rebounding, field goals made (728), field goal attempts (1,707), free throw percentage (.826) and games started (112). She is also second in school history in free throws made (443), third in free throw attempts (536), fifth in blocked shots (101) and 10th in assists (255). Among Ivy League greats, Zimmerman concludes her career ranked fourth in points, ninth in scoring average (17.5), eighth in field goals made, third in attempts, ninth in free throws made and 14th in free throw percentage.

She led the Ivy League in both scoring and rebounding in back-to-back years (2016–17 and 2017–18). She had a 43-game double-figure scoring streak, registered 39 career double-doubles, four career 30-point games, 47 20-point games and 96 double figure scoring games.

=== College Stats ===
Season	GP	PTS/G	FG %	3PT %	FT %	REB/G	A/G
2017–18	29	19.5	44.4		86.6	10.2	
2016–17	27	22.5	43.4	32.2	81.0	9.6	2.5
2015–16	29	14.4	46.8	37.8	78.9	7.3	1.8
2014–15	28	13.7	35.6	28.3	82.6	6.2	1.5

== Awards and honors ==
=== College ===
- First Team All-Ivy League: 2017 & 2018
- First Team All-Met (Met Basketball Writers Association), 2017 & 2018
- CoSIDA Academic All-District 1 First Team 2018.
- William V. Campbell Female Athlete of the Year (2017)
- All-Met Division I women's college basketball Player of the Year, and First Team All-Met: 2017
- Ann Myers Drysdale Women's National Player of the Week: 2017
- 10 Ivy League Player of the Week Awards, 2016 through 2018
- Women's Division I Player of the Week: 2017
- Second team All-Met by the Metropolitan Basketball Writers Association (MBWA), 2016
