= 2018 WNBA draft =

General information
- Sport: Basketball
- Date: April 12, 2018
- Location: Nike New York Headquarters, New York City
- Networks: ESPN2 (first round); ESPNU (Second and Third Rounds)

Overview
- League: WNBA
- First selection: A'ja Wilson; Las Vegas Aces

The 2018 WNBA draft was the league's draft for the 2018 WNBA season. On March 12, the league announced the draft would be held on April 12 at Nike New York Headquarters, a recently opened secondary headquarters for the athletic apparel giant located in Midtown Manhattan.

== Draft lottery ==
The lottery selection to determine the order of the top four picks in the 2018 Draft was set to take place on September 14, 2017, but was delayed by the league to November 13.

=== Lottery chances ===
The lottery selection to determine the order of the top four picks in the 2018 draft occurred on November 13, 2017. The lottery odds were based on combined records from the 2016 and 2017 WNBA seasons. The San Antonio Stars, with the worst two-year record, were guaranteed no worse than the third pick. With the Stars relocating to Las Vegas, Las Vegas retained these best odds. All odds out of 1,000 based on percentages (the 11–12–13–14 combination was ignored).

Note: Team selected for the No. 1 pick noted in bold text.

| Team | Combined 2016–17 record | Lottery chances | Result |
|---|---|---|---|
| **Las Vegas Aces** | **15–53** | **44.2%** | **1st pick** |
| Indiana Fever | 26–42 | 22.7% | 2nd pick |
| Chicago Sky (via Atlanta) | 29–39 (Note: Atlanta's record) | 17.8% | 3rd pick |
| Chicago Sky | 30–38 | 10.4% | 4th pick |

This is the fifth time that the lottery was won by the team that had the highest odds and second consecutive number 1 pick for Las Vegas.

== Notable prospects ==
On November 7, 2017, the WNBA announced the following notable prospects for the 2018 draft:

- A'ja Wilson - South Carolina
- Kelsey Mitchell - Ohio State
- Gabby Williams - Connecticut
- Kia Nurse - Connecticut
- Jordin Canada - UCLA
- Victoria Vivians - Mississippi State
- Myisha Hines-Allen - Louisville
- Katelynn Flaherty - Michigan

== Draft invitees ==
On April 6, 2018, the WNBA released the names of the players invited to be in attendance at the draft.

- Monique Billings, UCLA
- Lexie Brown, Duke
- Jordin Canada, UCLA
- Diamond DeShields, Çukurova (Turkey)
- Kelsey Mitchell, Ohio State
- Kia Nurse, UConn
- Azurá Stevens, UConn
- Victoria Vivians, Mississippi State
- Gabby Williams, UConn
- A'ja Wilson, South Carolina

== Key ==
| * | Denotes player who has been selected for at least one All-Star Game and All-WNBA Team |
| ^{+} | Denotes player who has been selected for at least one All-Star Game |
| ^{x} | Denotes player who has been selected for at least one All-WNBA Team |
| ^{#} | Denotes player who never played in the WNBA regular season or playoffs |
| **Bold** | Denotes player who won Rookie of the Year |

== Draft ==
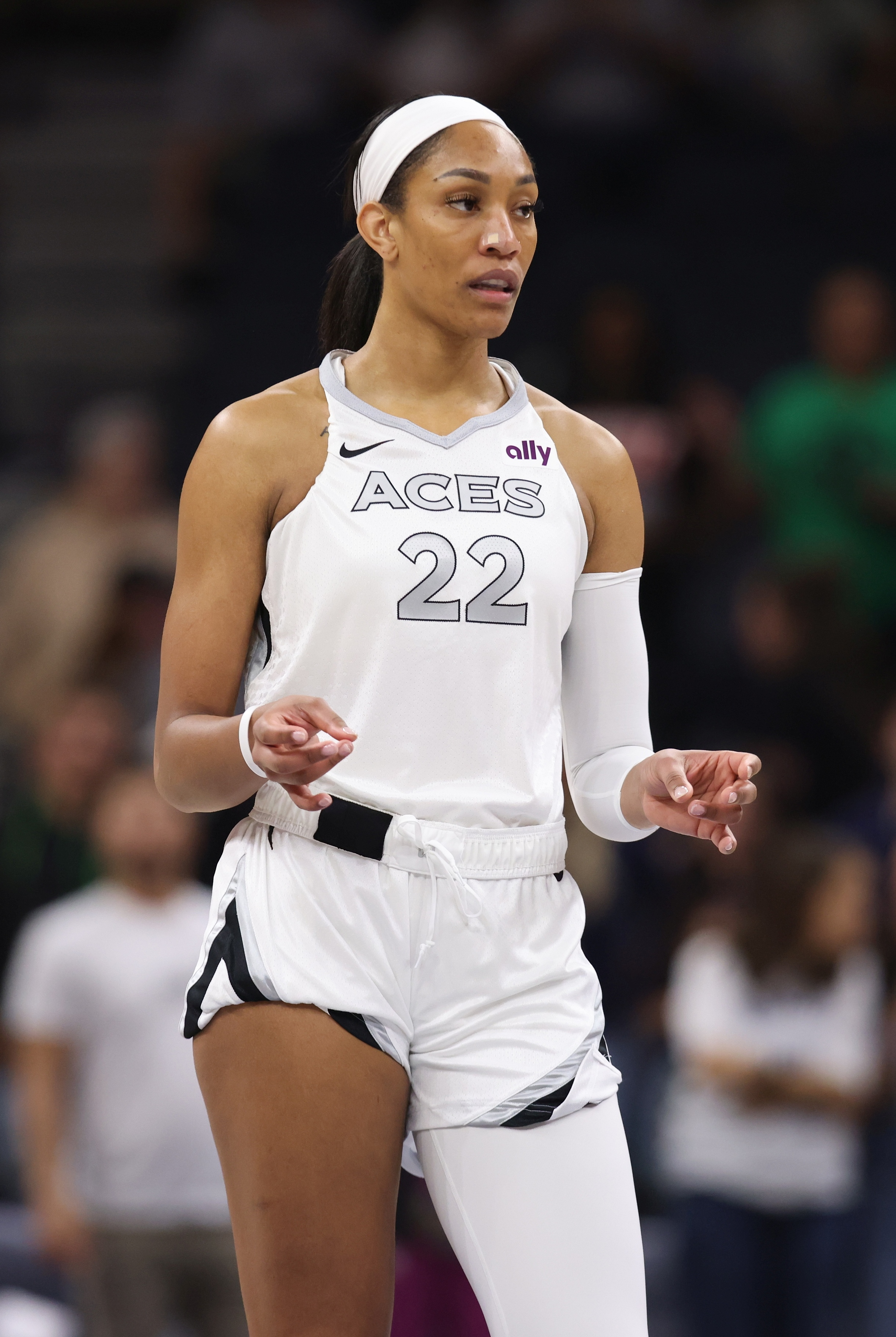
A'ja Wilson was selected 1st overall by the Las Vegas Aces.

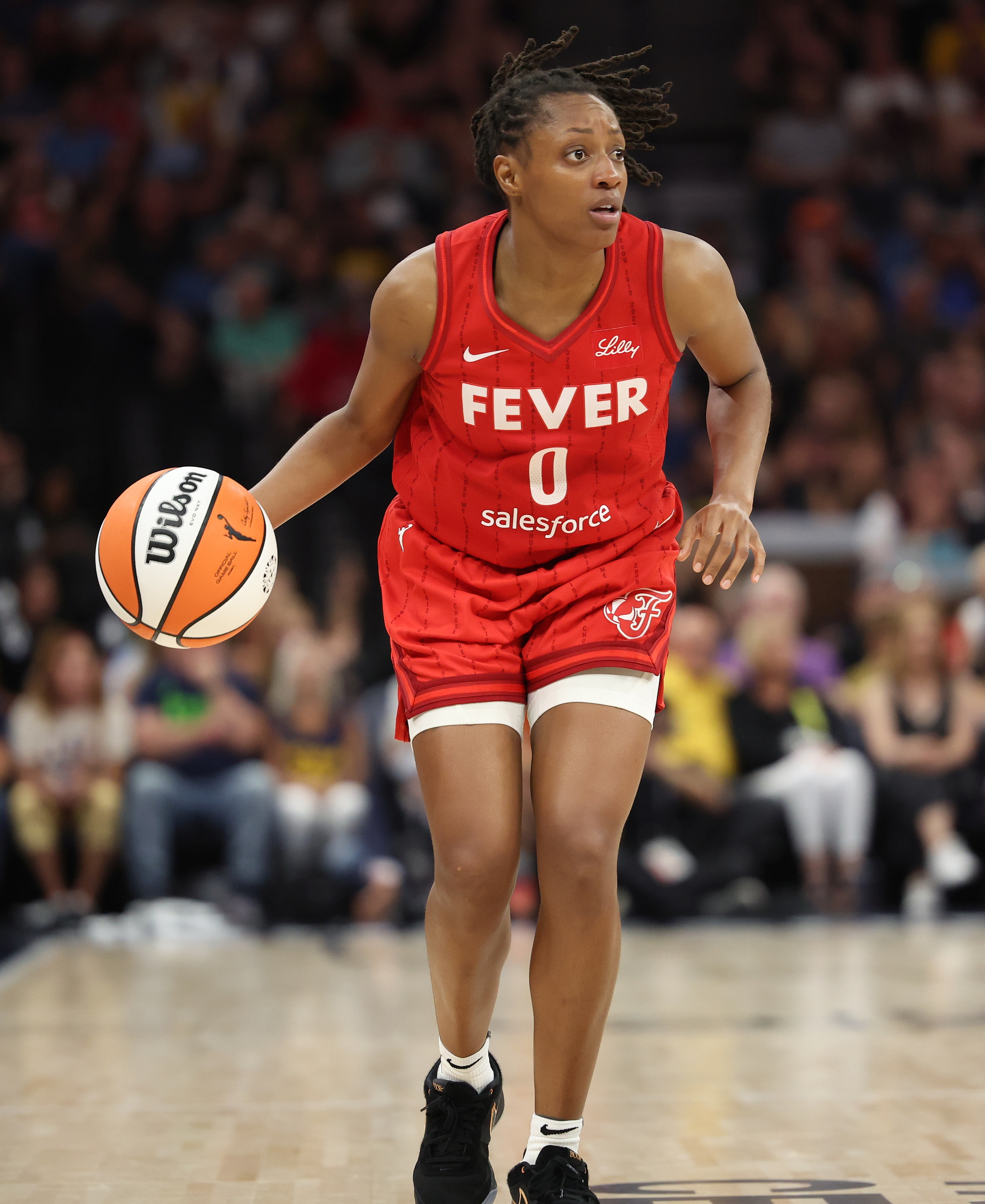
Kelsey Mitchell was selected 2nd overall by the Indiana Fever.

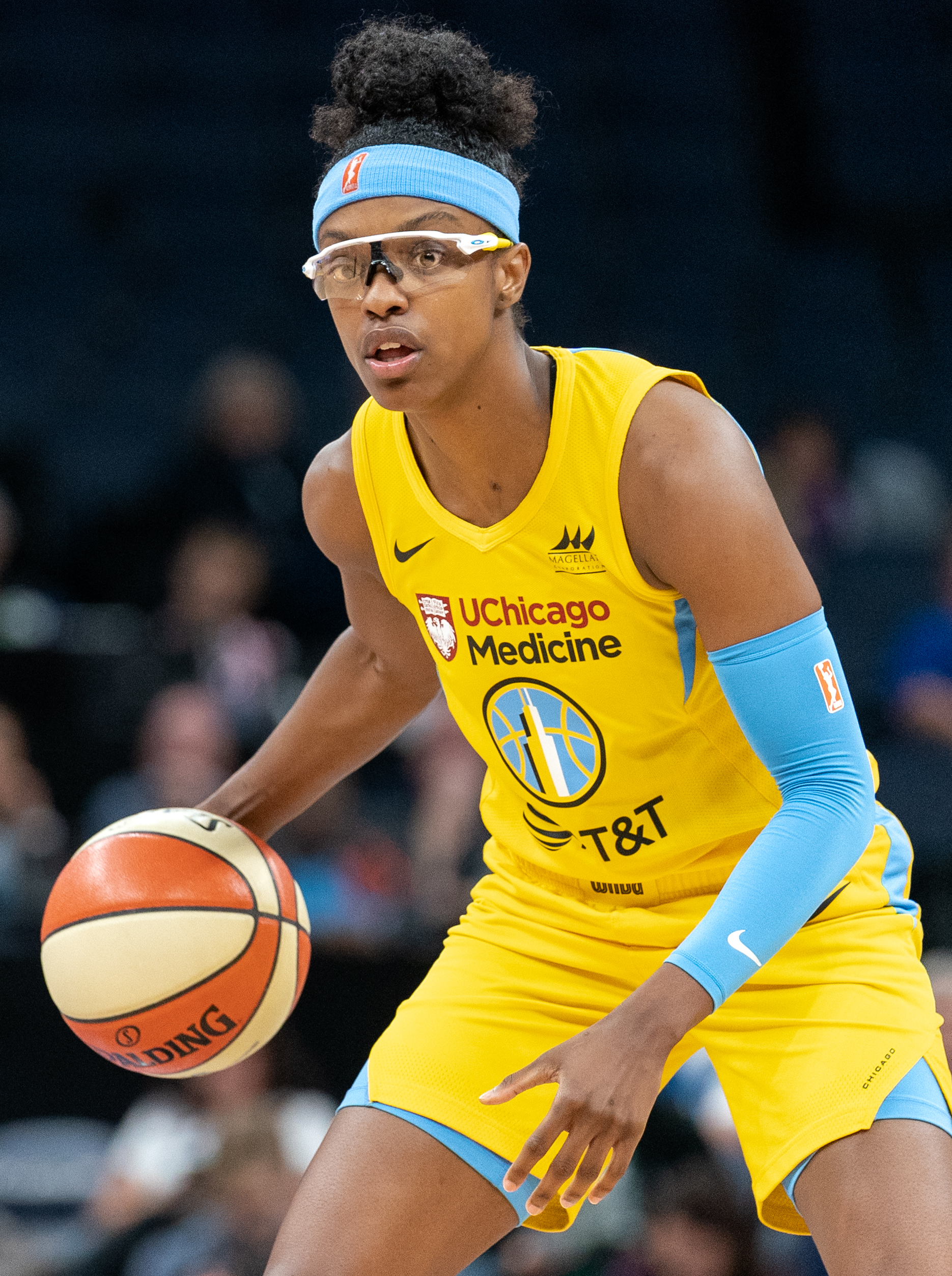
Diamond DeShields was selected 3rd overall by the Chicago Sky.

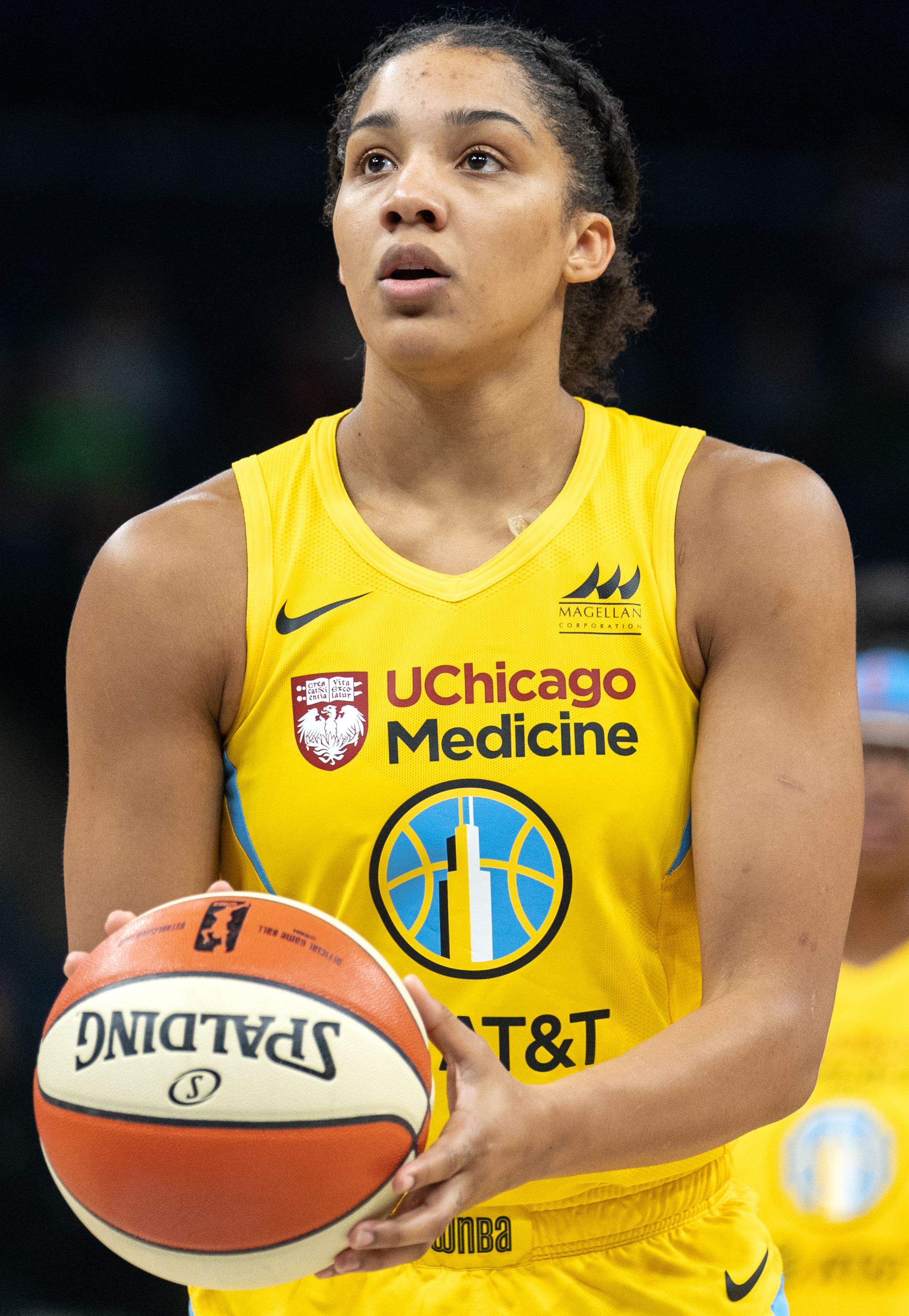
Gabby Williams was selected 4th overall by the Chicago Sky.

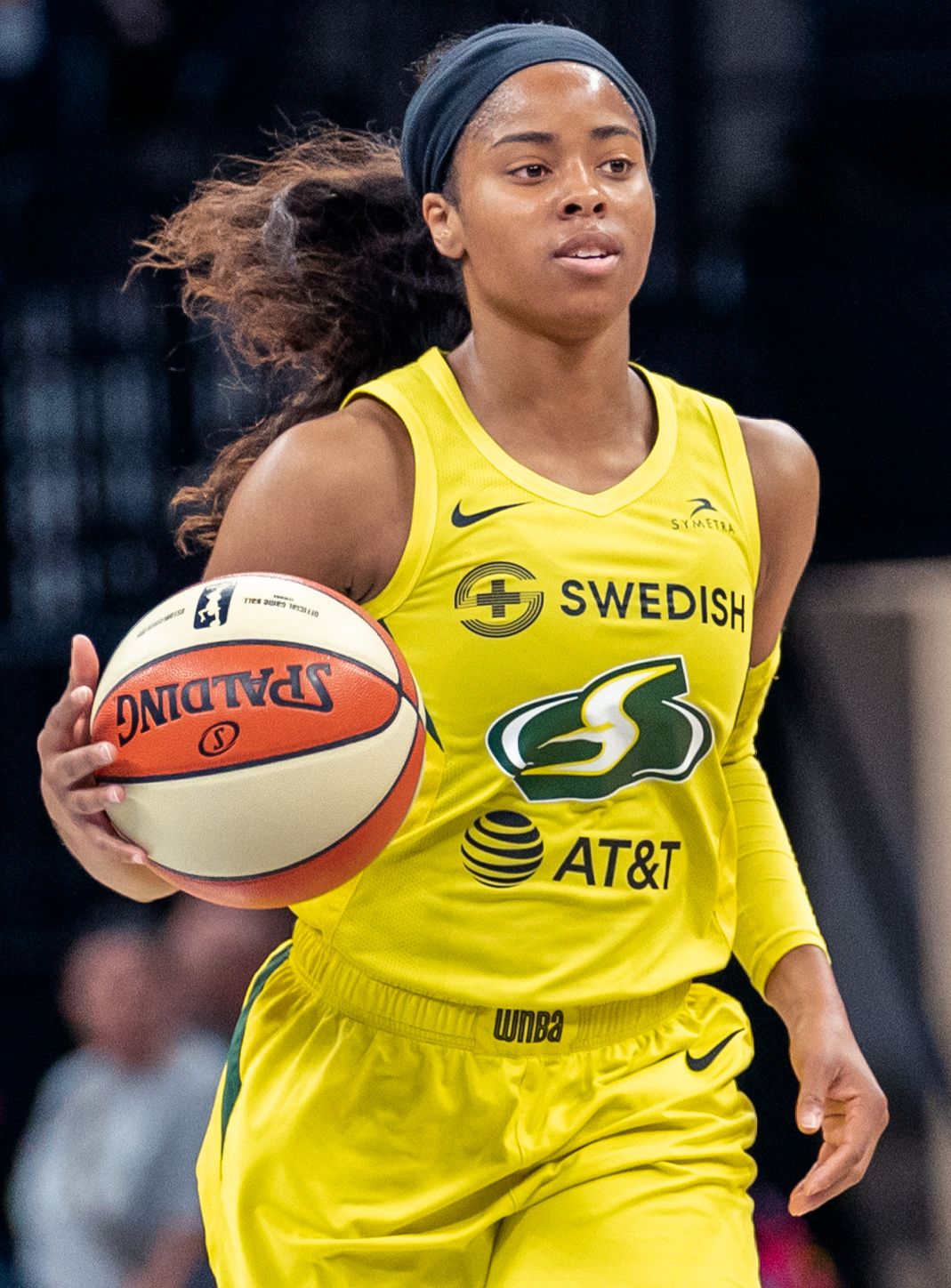
Jordin Canada was selected 5th overall by the Seattle Storm.

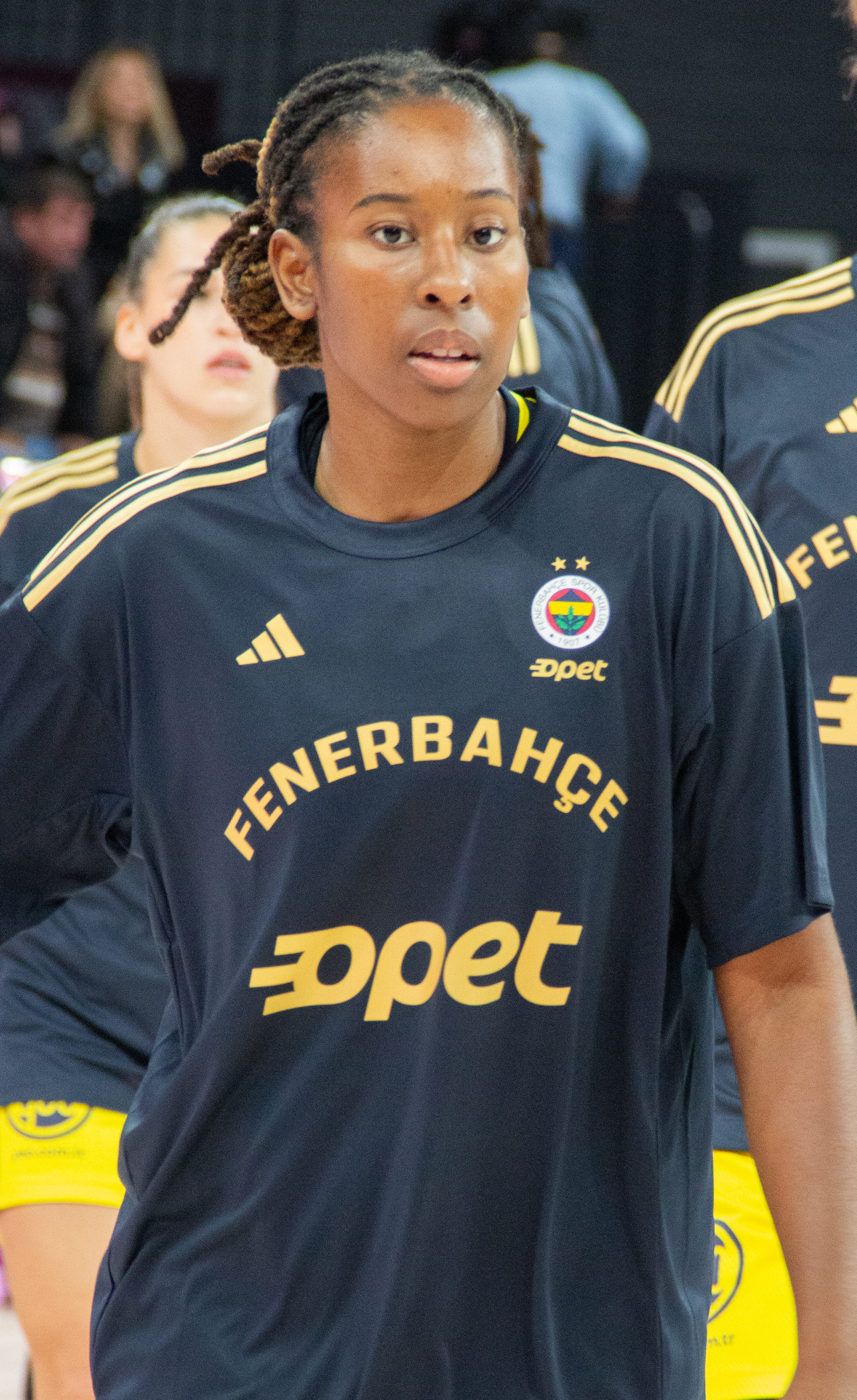
Ariel Atkins was selected 7th overall by the Washington Mystics.

=== Round 1 ===
| Pick | Player | Nationality | Team | School / club team |
|---|---|---|---|---|
| 1 | **A'ja Wilson** * | United States | Las Vegas Aces | South Carolina |
| 2 | Kelsey Mitchell * | United States | Indiana Fever | Ohio State |
| 3 | Diamond DeShields * | United States | Chicago Sky (from Atlanta) (Note: July 31, 2017: Atlanta to Chicago: Atlanta acquired Imani Boyette, Tamera Young and 2018 second round pick; Chicago acquired Jordan Hooper and 2018 first round pick) | Tennessee / Çukurova (Turkish Super League) |
| 4 | Gabby Williams ^{+} | France | Chicago Sky | UConn |
| 5 | Jordin Canada | United States | Seattle Storm | UCLA |
| 6 | Azurá Stevens | United States | Dallas Wings | UConn |
| 7 | Ariel Atkins ^{+} | United States | Washington Mystics | Texas |
| 8 | Victoria Vivians | United States | Indiana Fever (from Phoenix) (Note: March 6, 2018: Phoenix to Indiana: Indiana received 2018 No. 8 pick; Phoenix received Briann January) | Mississippi State |
| 9 | Lexie Brown | United States | Connecticut Sun | Duke |
| 10 | Kia Nurse ^{+} | Canada | New York Liberty | UConn |
| 11 | Maria Vadeeva | Russia | Los Angeles Sparks | Dynamo Kursk (Russia) |
| 12 | Marie Gülich | Germany | Phoenix Mercury (from Minnesota) (Note: March 6, 2018: Minnesota to Phoenix: Phoenix received 2018 No. 12 pick; Minnesota received Danielle Robinson and a 2019 second round pick) | Oregon State |

=== Round 2 ===
| Pick | Player | Nationality | Team | School / club team |
|---|---|---|---|---|
| 13 | Jaime Nared | United States | Las Vegas Aces | Tennessee |
| 14 | Stephanie Mavunga | United States | Indiana Fever | Ohio State |
| 15 | Monique Billings | United States | Atlanta Dream (from Atlanta via Connecticut) (Note: April 12, 2018: Connecticut to Atlanta: Atlanta re-acquired the 2018 No. 15 pick and received a 2019 second-round pick; Connecticut received Bria Holmes) (Note: June 8, 2017: Atlanta to Connecticut: Connecticut received a 2018 second-round pick; Atlanta received Jordan Hooper) | UCLA |
| 16 | Kristy Wallace | Australia | Atlanta Dream (from Chicago) | Baylor |
| 17 | Park Ji-su (traded to Las Vegas) (Note: April 13, 2018: Las Vegas to Minnesota: Las Vegas acquired rights to Park Ji-su and Kahlia Lawrence; Minnesota acquired rights to Jill Barta and a 2019 second round pick) | South Korea | Minnesota Lynx (from Seattle) (Note: February 7, 2018: Seattle to Minnesota: Minnesota received the 2018 No. 17 pick and the ability to swap 2019 first round picks; Seattle received Natasha Howard) | Cheongju KB Stars (South Korea) |
| 18 | Loryn Goodwin ^{#} | United States | Dallas Wings | Oklahoma State |
| 19 | Myisha Hines-Allen ^{x} | United States | Washington Mystics | Louisville |
| 20 | Tyler Scaife ^{#} | United States | Phoenix Mercury | Rutgers |
| 21 | Raisa Musina ^{#} | Russia | Phoenix Mercury (from Connecticut) (Note: February 2, 2018: Connecticut to Phoenix: Phoenix received the 2018 No. 21 pick; Connecticut received Cayla George) | UMMC Ekaterinburg (Russia) |
| 22 | Mercedes Russell | United States | New York Liberty | Tennessee |
| 23 | Shakayla Thomas ^{#} | United States | Los Angeles Sparks | Florida State |
| 24 | Kahlia Lawrence ^{#} (traded to Las Vegas) | United States | Minnesota Lynx | Mercer |

=== Round 3 ===
| Pick | Player | Nationality | Team | School / club team |
|---|---|---|---|---|
| 25 | Raigyne Louis | United States | Las Vegas Aces | LSU |
| 26 | Imani Wright | United States | Phoenix Mercury (from Indiana via Las Vegas) (Note: February 2, 2018: Las Vegas to Phoenix: Phoenix received the 2018 No. 26 pick and a 2019 second-round pick; Las Vegas received Kelsey Bone) (Note: May 9, 2017: Indiana to Las Vegas (San Antonio): San Antonio received a 2018 third round pick; Indiana received Jazmon Gwathmey) | Florida State |
| 27 | Mackenzie Engram ^{#} | United States | Atlanta Dream | Georgia |
| 28 | Amarah Coleman ^{#} | United States | Chicago Sky | DePaul |
| 29 | Teana Muldrow | United States | Seattle Storm | West Virginia |
| 30 | Natalie Butler^{#} | United States | Dallas Wings | George Mason |
| 31 | Rebecca Greenwell ^{#} | United States | Washington Mystics | Duke |
| 32 | Jill Barta ^{#} (traded to Minnesota) | United States | Las Vegas Aces (from Phoenix) (Note: June 28, 2017: Phoenix to Las Vegas (San Antonio): San Antonio received Shay Murphy, Sophie Brunner, and a 2018 third round pick; Phoenix received Monique Currie) | Gonzaga |
| 33 | Mikayla Cowling ^{#} | United States | Connecticut Sun | California |
| 34 | Leslie Robinson ^{#} | United States | New York Liberty | Princeton |
| 35 | Julia Reisingerova ^{#} | Czech Republic | Los Angeles Sparks | Femeni Sant Adrià (Spain) |
| 36 | Carlie Wagner ^{#} | United States | Minnesota Lynx | Minnesota |

== Viewership ==
The draft was telecast on ESPN2 (1st round) and ESPNU (2nd and 3rd rounds). The draft had an average audience of 212,000, which was an increase of 25% compared to the 2017 WNBA draft. The first round experienced an increase of 13% compared to 2017, with an average audience of 308,000. The 2nd and 3rd rounds saw a 49% increase in average viewers compared to 2017 (110,000 vs. 74,000). The 2018 draft was the most watched draft since 2014.

== See also ==
- List of first overall WNBA draft picks
