= 2018 WNBA season =

- League: Women's National Basketball Association
- Sport: Basketball
- Duration: May 18 – September 12, 2018
- Games: 34
- Teams: 12
- Average attendance: 6,721
- TV partner(s): ABC, ESPN, ESPN2, NBA TV

Draft
- Top draft pick: (United States) A'ja Wilson
- Picked by: Las Vegas Aces

Regular season
- Top seed: Atlanta Dream
- Season MVP: (United States) Breanna Stewart (Seattle)
- Top scorer: (Australia) Liz Cambage (Dallas)

Playoffs
- Finals champions: Seattle Storm
- Runners-up: Washington Mystics
- Finals MVP: (United States) Breanna Stewart (Seattle)

WNBA seasons
- ← 2017 2019 →

The 2018 WNBA season was the 22nd season of the Women's National Basketball Association (WNBA). The Minnesota Lynx are the defending champions. The regular season began on May 18, with the Phoenix Mercury hosting the Dallas Wings. The season ended with the Seattle Storm defeating the Washington Mystics 3-0 in the WNBA Finals. This was the third championship for the Storm. Seattle's Breanna Stewart was named regular season and finals MVP.

== Draft ==
The Las Vegas Aces selected A'ja Wilson first in the 2018 WNBA Draft. The draft was televised nationally on the ESPN networks (Round 1 on ESPN2, Rounds 2 and 3 on ESPNU).

=== Retirement ===
- On August 21, 2017, Plenette Pierson announced her retirement at the conclusion of the 2017 season. Pierson played 15 seasons and won three championships with the Detroit Shock and Minnesota Lynx.
- On February 3, 2018, Jia Perkins announced her retirement from the WNBA. Perkins played 14 seasons and won one championship with the Minnesota Lynx.

=== Free agency ===
Free agency negotiations began on February 1.

=== Coaching changes ===
Off-season
| Team | 2017 season | 2018 season |
|---|---|---|
| Seattle Storm | Gary Kloppenburg | Dan Hughes |
| New York Liberty | Bill Laimbeer | Katie Smith |
| Las Vegas Aces | Vickie Johnson | Bill Laimbeer |
| Atlanta Dream | Michael Cooper | Nicki Collen |
Mid-season
| Team | Outgoing coach | Incoming coach |
| Dallas Wings | Fred Williams | Taj McWilliams-Franklin |

== Arena changes ==
In addition to the relocated Las Vegas Aces, two other teams announced permanent moves to new arenas for the 2018 season.

- The Chicago Sky moved from Allstate Arena in suburban Rosemont, Illinois to the newly opened Wintrust Arena at the McCormick Place exhibition center on Chicago's Near South Side. The move was initially announced by the Metropolitan Pier and Exposition Authority, owner and operator of McCormick Place, on July 25, 2017. The Sky did not make their formal announcement until February 2, 2018.
- The New York Liberty announced on February 8, 2018 that they would move their primary home from Madison Square Garden, where they had played since the league's first season in 1997, to the Westchester County Center in suburban White Plains, New York. The team planned to play 15 of its 17 home games in White Plains, with the remaining two at the Garden.

== Regular season ==
=== All-Star Game ===
The 2018 WNBA All-Star Game was hosted by the Minnesota Lynx on July 28 at the Target Center. Coverage of the game began at 3:30pm. This is the first time the Lynx have hosted the annual event. This season a new selection format was used. Fans, coaches, media and players would all vote for players to be selected to the All-Star Game. The top 22 players receiving votes based on this weighting were selected to the All-Star Game. There was not a restriction on number of players from one conference. The top 2 vote getters were captains of the two All-Star teams and selected their teams from the pool of the remaining 20 players. The 22 All-Stars were revealed on July 17, 2018. The rosters were revealed on July 19, 2018.

ABC

July 28
3:30pm

Boxscore

Team Delle Donne 112, Team Parker 119
Scoring by quarter: 27–31, 23–23, 34–24, 35–34
| Pts: Moore, Quigley 18; Rebs: Four players 8 Asts: Diggins-Smith 8 | Pts: Toliver 23; Rebs: Three players 6 Asts: Bird 8 |

Target Center, Minneapolis, Minnesota
Attendance: 15,922
Referees: Maj Forsberg
Janetta Graham
Jeff Wooten

=== Standings ===
| # | Eastern Conference | W | L | PCT | GB | Home | Road | Conf. |
|---|---|---|---|---|---|---|---|---|
| 1 | Atlanta Dream (2) | 23 | 11 | .676 | – | 13–4 | 10–7 | 12–4 |
| 2 | Washington Mystics (3) | 22 | 12 | .647 | 1 | 12–5 | 10–7 | 12–4 |
| 3 | Connecticut Sun (4) | 21 | 13 | .618 | 2 | 13–4 | 8–9 | 9–7 |
| 4 | e – Chicago Sky | 13 | 21 | .382 | 10 | 7–10 | 6–11 | 6–10 |
| 5 | e – New York Liberty | 7 | 27 | .206 | 16 | 4–13 | 3–14 | 6–10 |
| 6 | e – Indiana Fever | 6 | 28 | .176 | 17 | 2–15 | 4–13 | 3–13 |

| # | Western Conference | W | L | PCT | GB | Home | Road | Conf. |
|---|---|---|---|---|---|---|---|---|
| 1 | Seattle Storm (1) | 26 | 8 | .765 | – | 13–4 | 13–4 | 11–5 |
| 2 | Phoenix Mercury (5) | 20 | 14 | .588 | 6 | 9–8 | 11–6 | 8–8 |
| 3 | Los Angeles Sparks (6) | 19 | 15 | .559 | 7 | 11–6 | 8–9 | 9–7 |
| 4 | Minnesota Lynx (7) | 18 | 16 | .529 | 8 | 9–8 | 9–8 | 9–7 |
| 5 | Dallas Wings (8) | 15 | 19 | .441 | 11 | 10–7 | 5–12 | 7–9 |
| 6 | e –Las Vegas Aces | 14 | 20 | .412 | 12 | 8–9 | 6–11 | 4–12 |

Notes

(#) – Conference Standing, Playoff Seeds shown to the right of team name
x – Qualified for playoffs
e – Eliminated from playoffs

=== Statistic leaders ===
The following shows the leaders for each statistic during the 2018 regular season.

| Category | Player | Team | Statistic |
|---|---|---|---|
| Points per game | Liz Cambage | Dallas Wings | 23.0 PPG |
| Rebounds per game | Sylvia Fowles | Minnesota Lynx | 11.9 RPG |
| Assists per game | Courtney Vandersloot | Chicago Sky | 8.6 APG |
| Steals per game | Maya Moore | Minnesota Lynx | 1.7 SPG |
| Blocks per game | Brittney Griner | Phoenix Mercury | 2.6 BPG |
| Field goal percentage | Sylvia Fowles | Minnesota Lynx | 61.9% (237–383) |
| Three point FG percentage | Briann January | Phoenix Mercury | 47.0% (77–182) |
| Free throw percentage | Diana Taurasi | Phoenix Mercury | 92.5% (172–186) |
| Points per game | Team Stat | Connecticut Sun | 87.6 PPG |
| Field goal percentage | Team Stat | Seattle Storm | 46.8% |

=== Schedule ===
2018 WNBA preseason
Preseason

| Date | Matchup | | | Result | High points | High rebounds | High assists | Location/Attendance |
|---|---|---|---|---|---|---|---|---|
| Thu April 12 | 2018 WNBA draft: first round | | | ESPN2 | | | | New York City |
| Thu April 12 | 2018 WNBA draft: later rounds | | | ESPNU | | | | New York City |
| Sun May 6 | Washington Mystics | vs. | Minnesota Lynx | 85–90 MIN | Robinson (18) | Tied (6) | Wright (4) | Wells Fargo Arena; 4,203 |
| Sun May 6 | Atlanta Dream | @ | Chicago Sky | 78–61 ATL | Hayes (16) | Parker (8) | Montgomery (7) | Wintrust Arena |
| Sun May 6 | China | @ | Las Vegas Aces | 63–98 LVA | Ting (22) | Tied (7) | Tied (5) | Mandalay Bay Events Center |
| Mon May 7 | Chicago Sky | @ | Indiana Fever | 65–79 IND | Mavunga (18) | Tied (8) | Peterson (4) | Bankers Life Fieldhouse; 4,377 |
| Mon May 7 | Dallas Wings | vs. | New York Liberty | 76–69 DAL | Stevens (19) | Stevens (10) | Zellous (4) | Mohegan Sun Arena |
| Mon May 7 | Los Angeles | @ | Connecticut Sun | 65–68 CON | Thomas (17) | Tied (8) | Pondexter (3) | Mohegan Sun Arena |
| Tues May 8 | Phoenix Mercury | @ | Seattle Storm | 69–73 SEA | Loyd (15) | Tied (6) | Tied (3) | KeyArena; 3,502 |
| Tues May 8 | Los Angeles | vs. | New York Liberty | 75–81 NYL | Nurse (19) | Gray (14) | Pondexter (5) | Mohegan Sun Arena; 1,106 |
| Tues May 8 | Dallas Wings | @ | Connecticut Sun | 58–79 CON | Williams (18) | A. Thomas (12) | A. Thomas (5) | Mohegan Sun Arena; 3,695 |
| Fri May 11 | Atlanta Dream | @ | Connecticut Sun | 58–74 CON | Tied (13) | Williams (6) | Tied (3) | Webster Bank Arena; 1,610 |
| Sat May 12 | China | @ | Los Angeles | 61–82 LAS | Gray (17) | Wang Jaiqui (8) | Gray (10) | Hutto-Patterson Gym; 1,650 |
| Sat May 12 | Indiana Fever | @ | Washington Mystics | 56–91 WAS | Tied (15) | Hawkins (7) | Tied (3) | Acierno Arena (University of Delaware); 3,323 |
| Sat May 12 | Chicago Sky | @ | Minnesota Lynx | 58–87 MIN | Fowles (17) | Fowles (9) | Tied (5) | Target Center; 5,024 |
| Sat May 12 | Seattle Storm | @ | Phoenix | 61–84 SEA | Canada (17) | Lyttle (11) | Bird (5) | Talking Stick Resort Arena; 4,535 |
| Sun May 13 | Las Vegas Aces | @ | Dallas Wings | 55–68 DAL | Stevens (12) | Wilson (12) | Chong (4) | College Park Center |

2018 WNBA regular season
May

| Date | Matchup | | | TV | Result | High points | High rebounds | High assists | Location/Attendance |
|---|---|---|---|---|---|---|---|---|---|
| Fri May 18 | Dallas Wings | @ | Phoenix Mercury | NBA TV, FSA+ | 78–86 PHO | Taurasi (26) | Bonner (12) | Diggins-Smith (9) | Talking Stick Resort Arena; 11,210 |
| Sat May 19 | Chicago Sky | @ | Indiana Fever | NBA TV, WNDY | 82–64 CHI | Quigley (19) | Tied (8) | Tied (5) | Bankers Life Fieldhouse; 6,565 |
| Sun May 20 | Las Vegas Aces | @ | Connecticut Sun | Twitter | 65–101 CON | Young (23) | A. Thomas (17) | J. Thomas (6) | Mohegan Sun Arena; 6,637 |
| Sun May 20 | Indiana Fever | @ | Washington Mystics | NBA TV, NBCSWA | 64–82 WAS | Achonwa (21) | Achonwa (12) | Delle Donne (7) | Capital One Arena; 7,400 |
| Sun May 20 | Atlanta Dream | @ | Dallas Wings | Twitter, FFSW-DAL+ | 78–101 DAL | Diggins–Smith (25) | Christmas–Kelly (10) | Davis (5) | College Park Center; 5,907 |
| Sun May 20 | Los Angeles Sparks | @ | Minnesota Lynx | ESPN2 | 77–76 LAS | Sims (21) | Fowles (12) | Whalen (9) | Target Center; 13,032 |
| Sun May 20 | New York Liberty | @ | Chicago Sky | Twitter, The U Too, MSG+ | 76–80 CHI | Quigley (22) | Parker (8) | Hartley (6) | Wintrust Arena; 7,922 |
| Sun May 20 | Phoenix Mercury | @ | Seattle Storm | Twitter, KZJO-TV | 87–82 PHO | Griner (29) | Stewart (15) | Bonner (7) | KeyArena; 8,602 |
| Tues May 22 | Los Angeles Sparks | @ | Indiana Fever | Twitter | 87–70 LAS | Ogwumike (25) | Ogwumike (10) | Gray (8) | Bankers Life Fieldhouse; 4,742 |
| Tues May 22 | Las Vegas Aces | @ | Washington Mystics | League Pass, Monumental | 70–75 WAS | Delle Donne (23) | Delle Donne (11) | Allen (6) | Capital One Arena; 4,509 |
| Wed May 23 | Atlanta Dream | @ | Chicago Sky | LeaguePass | 81–63 ATL | Hayes (22) | Breland (10) | Williams (6) | Wintrust Arena; 6,147 |
| Wed May 23 | Dallas Wings | @ | Minnesota Lynx | League Pass, FSNTH | 68–76 MIN | Fowles (23) | Fowles (20) | Whalen (8) | Target Center; 7,834 |
| Wed May 23 | Seattle Storm | @ | Phoenix Mercury | League Pass | 87–71 SEA | Loyd (29) | Stewart (11) | Tied (4) | Talking Stick Resort Arena; 8,068 |
| Thurs May 24 | Los Angeles Sparks | @ | Connecticut Sun | ESPN2 | 94–102 CON | Gray (21) | A. Thomas (9) | J. Thomas (8) | Mohegan Sun Arena; 5,571 |
| Thurs May 24 | Washington Mystics | @ | Indiana Fever | ESPN3, Monumental | 93–84 WAS | Delle Done (26) | Delle Done (10) | T. Mitchell (3) | Bankers Life Fieldhouse; 4,415 |
| Fri May 25 | Minnesota Lynx | @ | New York Liberty | LeaguePass, MSG+ | 78–72 MIN | Augustus (21) | Charles (12) | Robinson (5) | Westchester County Center; 2,315 |
| Fri May 25 | Chicago Sky | @ | Seattle Storm | LeaguePass, KZJO-TV, The U Too | 91–95 (OT) SEA | Loyd (29) | Howard (10) | Tied (9) | KeyArena; 5,866 |
| Sat May 26 | Dallas Wings | @ | Atlanta Dream | LeaguePass, FSSE-ATL | 78–70 DAL | Diggins-Smith (24) | Cambage (14) | Tied (4) | McCamish Pavilion; 4,749 |
| Sat May 26 | Indiana Fever | @ | Connecticut Sun | LeaguePass | 77–86 CON | A. Thomas (21) | McCall (9) | Wheeler (9) | Mohegan Sun Arena; 5,843 |
| Sun May 27 | Minnesota Lynx | @ | Washington Mystics | LeaguePass, NBCSWA | 78–90 WAS | Toliver (19) | Hines–Allen (13) | Cloud (8) | Capital One Arena; 5,723 |
| Sun May 27 | Phoenix Mercury | @ | Los Angeles Sparks | LeaguePass, SpecSN | 72–80 LAS | Gray (23) | Ogwumike (8) | Gray (8) | Staples Center; 11,201 |
| Sun May 27 | Seattle Storm | @ | Las Vegas Aces | NBA TV, KZJO-TV | 105–98 SEA | Wilson (27) | Stewart (9) | Loyd (9) | Mandalay Bay Events Center; 7,662 |
| Tues May 29 | Minnesota Lynx | @ | Atlanta Dream | Twitter | 74–76 ATL | Hayes (20) | Fowles (13) | Robinson (6) | McCamish Pavilion; 3,785 |
| Tues May 29 | Dallas Wings | @ | New York Liberty | LeaguePass, MSG+ | 89–94 NYL | Charles (34) | Cambage (16) | Zellous (9) | Westchester County Center; 1,516 |
| Tues May 29 | Washington Mystics | @ | Seattle Storm | Twitter, KZJO-TV | 77–81 SEA | Loyd (27) | Hines–Allen (11) | Bird (7) | KeyArena; 5,235 |
| Wed May 30 | Washington Mystics | @ | Phoenix Mercury | LeaguePass, Monumental | 103–95 WAS | Toliver (30) | Hawkins (12) | Taurasi (7) | Talking Stick Resort Arena; 8,188 |
| Thurs May 31 | Las Vegas Aces | @ | Seattle Storm | LeaguePass, KZJO-TV | 74–101 SEA | Tied (21) | Russell (8) | Bird (9) | KeyArena; 5,235 |

June

| Date | Matchup | | | TV | Result | High points | High rebounds | High assists | Location/Attendance |
|---|---|---|---|---|---|---|---|---|---|
| Fri June 1 | Phoenix Mercury | @ | Minnesota Lynx | ESPN2 | 95–85 PHO | Taurasi (29) | Griner (9) | Taurasi (6) | Target Center; 8,830 |
| Fri June 1 | Connecticut Sun | @ | Chicago Sky | ESPN3, The U Too, NBCSB | 110–72 CON | Tied (20) | A. Thomas (13) | Vandersloot (7) | Wintrust Arena; 4,131 |
| Fri June 1 | Washington Mystics | @ | Las Vegas Aces | LeaguePass, ATTSN-RM, Monumental | 73–85 LVA | Wilson (26) | Wilson (12) | Tied (4) | Mandalay Bay Events Center; 5,575 |
| Sat June 2 | New York Liberty | @ | Indiana Fever | LeaguePass, FSIND, MSG+ | 87–81 NYL | Nurse (34) | Stokes (12) | Wheeler (7) | Bankers Life Fieldhouse; 5,575 |
| Sat June 2 | Seattle Storm | @ | Dallas Wings | LeaguePass, FSSW-DAL+ | 90–94 DAL | Stewart (28) | Howard (9) | Canada (9) | College Park Center; 5,191 |
| Sun June 3 | Phoenix Mercury | @ | Atlanta Dream | LeaguePass, FSSE-ATL | 78–71 PHO | McCoughtry (21) | McCoughtry (10) | Taurasi (8) | McCamish Pavilion; 3,796 |
| Sun June 3 | Connecticut Sun | @ | Washington Mystics | LeaguePass, NBCSWA, NBCSB | 88–64 CON | J. Thomas (25) | Williams (10) | A. Thomas (4) | Capital One Arena; 5,176 |
| Sun June 3 | Minnesota Lynx | @ | Los Angeles Sparks | LeaguePass, SpecSN | 69–77 LAS | Parker (19) | Parker (10) | Gray (6) | Staples Center; 13,500 |
| Sun June 3 | Las Vegas Aces | @ | Chicago Sky | LeaguePass, The U Too | 90–94 CHI | De Shields (25) | Parker (13) | Vandersloot (9) | Wintrust Arena; 5,052 |
| Tues June 5 | Phoenix Mercury | @ | New York Liberty | Twitter, MSG+ | 80–74 PHO | Griner (26) | Tied (8) | Taurasi (8) | Madison Square Garden; 7,215 |
| Tues June 5 | Connecticut Sun | @ | Atlanta Dream | LeaguePass, FSSO, NBCSB | 77–82 ATL | Hayes (22) | A. Thomas (17) | A. Thomas (7) | McCamish Pavilion; 2,830 |
| Thurs June 7 | Minnesota Lynx | @ | Washington Mystics | LeaguePass, NBCSWA | 88–80 WAS | Fowles (21) | Fowles (12) | Cloud (9) | Capital One Arena; 8,587 |
| Thurs June 7 | Connecticut Sun | @ | New York Liberty | LeaguePass, MSG+, NBCSB | 88–86 CON | Charles (24) | Tied (9) | J. Thomas (8) | Westchester County Center; 1,581 |
| Thurs June 7 | Seattle Storm | @ | Los Angeles Sparks | ESPN2 | 88–63 SEA | Ogwumike (19) | Howard (9) | Bird (8) | Staples Center; 9,204 |
| Fri June 8 | Atlanta Dream | @ | Las Vegas Aces | LeaguePass, ATTSN-RM | 87–83 ATL | Hayes (24) | Tied (9) | Allen (7) | Mandalay Bay Events Center; 5,913 |
| Fri June 8 | Dallas Wings | @ | Indiana Fever | LeaguePass | 89–83 DAL | Diggins-Smith (35) | Diggins-Smith (12) | Diggins-Smith (6) | Bankers Life Fieldhouse; 5,675 |
| Fri June 8 | Chicago Sky | @ | Phoenix Mercury | LeaguePass, The U Too | 79–96 PHO | Williams (26) | Griner (8) | Taurasi (7) | Talking Stick Resort Arena; 8,834 |
| Sat June 9 | Minnesota Lynx | @ | Connecticut Sun | NBA TV, NBCSB | 75–89 CON | Williams (22) | Fowles (14) | Tied (4) | Mohegan Sun Arena; 6,771 |
| Sun June 10 | Indiana Fever | @ | New York Liberty | LeaguePass, MSG | 75–78 NYL | K. Mitchell (19) | Achonwa (10) | T. Mitchell (7) | Westchester County Center; 1,537 |
| Sun June 10 | Chicago Sky | @ | Los Angeles Sparks | LeaguePass, SpecSN | 59–77 LAS | Can. Parker (24) | Che. Parker (12) | Faulkner (6) | Staples Center; 8,239 |
| Sun June 10 | Las Vegas Aces | @ | Phoenix Mercury | LeaguePass, FSA+ | 66–72 PHO | Taurasi (25) | Griner (15) | Plum (6) | Talking Stick Resort Arena; 8,471 |
| Sun June 10 | Atlanta Dream | @ | Seattle Storm | LeaguePass, KZJO-TV | 67–64 ATL | Hayes (23) | Howard (15) | Tied (3) | Mohegan Sun Arena; 6,771 |
| Tues June 12 | Las Vegas Aces | @ | Indiana Fever | LeaguePass | 101–92 LVA | Wilson (35) | Achonwa (15) | Young (9) | Bankers Life Fieldhouse; 5,437 |
| Tues June 12 | Phoenix Mercury | @ | Dallas Wings | Twitter, FSSW-DAL+ | 75–72 PHO | Taurasi (21) | Lyttle (10) | January (6) | College Park Center; 4,026 |
| Tues June 12 | Chicago Sky | @ | Seattle Storm | LeaguePass, The U Too | 85–96 SEA | Breanna Stewart (30) | Parker (10) | Tied (5) | KeyArena; 4,353 |
| Tues June 12 | Atlanta Dream | @ | Los Angeles Sparks | NBA TV, SpecSN | 64–72 LAS | Parker (18) | Ogwumike (10) | Gray (7) | Staples Center; 9,215 |
| Wed Jun 13 | Washington Mystics | @ | Connecticut Sun | ESPN2 | 95–91 WAS | Delle Donne (36) | Ogwumike (13) | J. Thomas (5) | Mohegan Sun Arena |
| Wed Jun 13 | Las Vegas | @ | New York Liberty | ESPN3, MSG+ | 78–63 LVA | Charles (19) | Coleman (5) | Allen (7) | Westchester County Center; 1,419 |
| Thur Jun 14 | Indiana Fever | @ | Atlanta Dream | NBA TV, FSSO | 67–72 ATL | Hayes (23) | Breland (13) | Wheeler (10) | McCamish Pavilion; 6,561 |
| Fri June 15 | Los Angeles Sparks | @ | Washington Mystics | LeaguePass, NBCSWA, SpecSN | 97–86 LAS | Parker (23) | Sanders (11) | Parker (11) | Capital One Arena; 5,289 |
| Fri June 15 | Las Vegas Aces | @ | Dallas Wings | NBA TV, FSSW-DAL+ | 67–77 DAL | Cambage (28) | Cambage (18) | Diggins–Smith (6) | College Park Center; 4,549 |
| Fri June 15 | Connecticut Sun | @ | Seattle Storm | NBA TV, KZJO-TV, WCCT | 92–103 SEA | Ogwumike (30) | Stewart (9) | J. Thomas (6) | KeyArena; 7,094 |
| Sat Jun 16 | Atlanta Dream | @ | Indiana Fever | LeaguePass, WNDY | 64–96 IND | Vivians (21) | McCoughtry (8) | K. Mitchell (5) | Bankers Life Fieldhouse; 6,234 |
| Sat Jun 16 | New York Liberty | @ | Minnesota Lynx | NBA TV, FSNTH, MSG+ | 71–85 MIN | Fowles (25) | Fowles (9) | Robinson (8) | Target Center; 9,114 |
| Sat Jun 16 | Connecticut Sun | @ | Phoenix Mercury | LeaguePass | 72–89 PHO | Tuck (20) | Tied (9) | January (8) | Talking Stick Resort Arena; 12,497 |
| Sun Jun 17 | Los Angeles Sparks | @ | Chicago Sky | NBA TV, The U Too, SpecSN | 81–72 LAS | Gray (21) | Tied (11) | Vandersloot (7) | Wintrust Arena; 5,584 |
| Sun Jun 17 | Phoenix Mercury | @ | Las Vegas | NBA TV, ATTSN-RM | 92–80 PHO | Taurasi (28) | Coffey (12) | Taurasi (7) | Mandalay Bay Events Center; 4,432 |
| Tues Jun 19 | Atlanta Dream | @ | New York Liberty | LeaguePass, MSG+ | 72–79 NYL | McCoughtry (39) | McCoughtry (14) | Boyd (11) | Westchester County Center; 1,627 |
| Tues Jun 19 | Chicago Sky | @ | Washington Mystics | LeaguePass, NBCSWA, The U Too | 60–88 WAS | Toliver (19) | Parker (9) | Toliver (8) | Capital One Arena; 1,419 |
| Tues Jun 19 | Dallas Wings | @ | Minnesota Lynx | LeaguePass, FSNTH GO | 83–91 MIN | Moore (21) | Fowles (17) | Tied (7) | Target Center; 9,114 |
| Tues Jun 19 | Las Vegas | @ | Seattle Storm | Twitter, KZJO-TV | 89–77 LVA | Stewart (27) | Wilson (16) | Loyd (7) | KeyArena; 6,395 |
| Tues Jun 19 | Indiana Fever | @ | Los Angeles Sparks | LeaguePass, SpecSN | 55–74 LAS | Parker (15) | Achonwa (14) | Gray (7) | Staples Center; 8,857 |
| Fri Jun 22 | Connecticut Sun | @ | Atlanta Dream | LeaguePass, FSSE-ATL, NBCSB | 70–75 ATL | McCoughtry (25) | Williams (10) | Tied (4) | McCamish Pavilion; 4,047 |
| Fri Jun 22 | Los Angeles Sparks | @ | Dallas Wings | LeaguePass, FSSW-DAL+ | 72–101 DAL | Cambage (20) | Powers (8) | Diggins–Smith (11) | College Park Center; 5,672 |
| Fri Jun 22 | Washington Mystics | @ | Chicago Sky | ESPN3, The U Too, Monumental | 93–77 CHI | Delle Donne (30) | Sanders (11) | Vandersloot (7) | Wintrust Arena; 5,831 |
| Fri Jun 22 | New York Liberty | @ | Las Vegas | ESPN2 | 78–88 LVA | McBride (27) | Wilson (14) | Charles (5) | Mandalay Bay Events Center; 5,478 |
| Fri Jun 22 | Minnesota Lynx | @ | Phoenix Mercury | ESPN3, FSA+, FSNTH+ | 83–72 PHO | Tied (23) | Griner (13) | Taurasi (6) | Talking Stick Resort Arena; 11,349 |
| Fri Jun 22 | Indiana Fever | @ | Seattle Storm | ESPN2, KZJO-TV | 63–72 SEA | Loyd (25) | Howard (9) | Bird (7) | KeyArena; 8,142 |
| Sun Jun 24 | Seattle Storm | @ | Dallas Wings | NBA TV, FSSW-DAL+ | 97–76 SEA | Stewart (28) | Stewart (12) | Bird (10) | College Park Center; 4,084 |
| Sun Jun 24 | New York Liberty | @ | Los Angeles Sparks | LeaguePass, SpecSN, MSG+ | 54–80 LAS | Williams (25) | Ogwumike (10) | Gray (11) | Staples Center; 9,203 |
| Sun Jun 24 | Connecticut Sun | @ | Indiana Fever | LeaguePass, FSIND, NBCSB | 87–78 CON | Banham (20) | B. Jones (10) | Bentley (6) | Bankers Life Fieldhouse; 5,458 |
| Sun Jun 24 | Minnesota Lynx | @ | Las Vegas | NBA TV, ATTSN-RM | 88–73 MIN | Moore (23) | Fowles (10) | Whalen (9) | Mandalay Bay Arena |
| Sun Jun 24 | Chicago Sky | @ | Phoenix Mercury | LeaguePass, The U Too | 88–97 CHI | Quigley (20) | Griner (13) | Vandersloot (12) | Wintrust Arena; 4,741 |
| Tues Jun 26 | Phoenix Mercury | @ | New York Liberty | LeaguePass, MSG+ | 83–69 PHO | Taurasi (27) | Griner (9) | Tied (7) | Westchester County Center; 1,839 |
| Tues Jun 26 | Connecticut Sun | @ | Washington Mystics | LeaguePass, NBCSWA, NBCSB | 80–92 WAS | Delle Donne (25) | Ogwumike (11) | Toliver (8) | Capital One Arena; 4,139 |
| Tues Jun 26 | Seattle Storm | @ | Minnesota Lynx | LeaguePass, FSNTH GO | 79–91 MIN | Moore (32) | Fowles (17) | Bird (9) | Target Center; 8,634 |
| Tues Jun 26 | Dallas Wings | @ | Los Angeles Sparks | Twitter, SpecSN | 83–87 LAS | Parker (29) | Cambage (14) | Parker (7) | Staples Center; 10,002 |
| Wed Jun 27 | Atlanta Dream | @ | Chicago Sky | LeaguePass | 80–93 CHI | DeShields (23) | DeShields (11) | Vandersloot (11) | Wintrust Arena; 8,521 |
| Wed Jun 27 | Indiana Fever | @ | Connecticut Sun | NBA TV, NBCSB | 89–101 CON | Vivians (25) | Ogwumike (10) | J. Thomas (6) | Mohegan Sun Arena; 5,112 |
| Wed Jun 27 | Dallas Wings | @ | Las Vegas Aces | NBA TV, ATTSN-RM | 97–91 DAL | McBride (38) | Wilson (15) | Tied (8) | Mandalay Bay Events Center; 5,246 |
| Thurs Jun 28 | New York Liberty | @ | Washington Mystics | NBA TV, NBCSWA, MSG+ | 77–80 WAS | Delle Donne (22) | Charles (7) | Charles (6) | Capital One Arena; 4,473 |
| Thurs Jun 28 | Los Angeles Sparks | @ | Seattle Storm | ESPN2 | 72–81 SEA | Tied (27) | Parker (11) | Bird (11) | KeyArena; 8,447 |
| Fri Jun 29 | Phoenix Mercury | @ | Indiana Fever | LeaguePass | 95–77 PHO | Taurasi (25) | Bonner (9) | Turner (7) | Bankers Life Fieldhouse; 7,241 |
| Fri Jun 29 | Chicago Sky | @ | New York Liberty | LeaguePass, MSG+, The U Too | 103–99 CHI | Charles (24) | Dolson (6) | Vandersloot (11) | Westchester County Center; 1,837 |
| Fri Jun 29 | Atlanta Dream | @ | Minnesota Lynx | NBA TV, FSNTH GO | 74–85 MIN | Moore (24) | Fowles (15) | Whalen (7) | Target Center; 9,209 |
| Fri Jun 29 | Los Angeles Sparks | @ | Las Vegas | LeaguePass, ATTSN-RM, SpecSN | 78–94 LVA | Wilson (29) | Plum (9) | Beard (7) | Mandalay Bay Events Center; 5,124 |
| Sat Jun 30 | Phoenix Mercury | @ | Washington Mystics | LeaguePass, Monumental | 84–74 PHO | Delle Donne (27) | Delle Donne (13) | Taurasi (9) | Capital One Arena; 6,218 |

July

| Date | Matchup | | | TV | Result | High points | High rebounds | High assists | Location/Attendance |
|---|---|---|---|---|---|---|---|---|---|
| Sun Jul 1 | Minnesota Lynx | @ | Dallas Wings | LeaguePass, FSSW-DAL+, FSNTH+ | 76–72 MIN | Moore (26) | Fowles (9) | Diggins–Smith (7) | College Park Center; 4,448 |
| Sun Jul 1 | Las Vegas | @ | Los Angeles Sparks | LeaguePass, SpecSN | 71–87 LAS | Lavender (17) | Ogwumike (7) | Young (8) | Staples Center; 12,003 |
| Sun Jul 1 | Atlanta Dream | @ | Indiana Fever | LeaguePass, WNDY | 87–83 ATL | Vivians (27) | Tied (7) | Sykes (7) | Bankers Life Fieldhouse; 5,277 |
| Sun Jul 1 | New York Liberty | @ | Chicago Sky | LeaguePass, The U Too, MSG+ | 97–94 NYL | Tied (28) | Vaughn (11) | Faulkner (8) | Wintrust Arena; 5,382 |
| Sun Jul 1 | Connecticut Sun | @ | Seattle Storm | LeaguePass, KZJO-TV, NBCSB | 70–84 SEA | Bentley (15) | Howard (8) | Bird (9) | KeyArena; 9,307 |
| Tues Jul 3 | Seattle Storm | @ | New York Liberty | LeaguePass, MSG+ | 77–62 SEA | Tied (21) | Stewart (8) | Bird (11) | Westchester County Center; 1,749 |
| Tues Jul 3 | Chicago Sky | @ | Dallas Wings | LeaguePass, FSSW-DAL+ | 85–108 DAL | Cambage (37) | Cambage (10) | Vandersloot (7) | College Park Center; 4,012 |
| Tues Jul 3 | Indiana Fever | @ | Minnesota Lynx | Twitter | 71–59 MIN | Achonwa (17) | Brunson (12) | Brunson (6) | Target Center; 8,632 |
| Tues Jul 3 | Connecticut Sun | @ | Los Angeles Sparks | LeaguePass, SpecSN, WCCT | 73–72 CON | Ogwumike (21) | Parker (8) | Banham (6) | Staples Center; 6,280 |
| Thurs Jul 5 | New York Liberty | @ | Washington Mystics | ESPN3, NBCSWA, MSG+ | 67–86 WAS | Charles (26) | Charles (12) | Cloud (10) | Capital One Arena; 4,674 |
| Thurs Jul 5 | Indiana Fever | @ | Dallas Wings | ESPN3, FSSW-DAL+ | 63–90 DAL | Stevens (26) | Johnson (11) | Diggins–Smith (7) | College Park Center; 4,043 |
| Thurs Jul 5 | Los Angeles Sparks | @ | Minnesota Lynx | ESPN2 | 72–83 MIN | Fowles (27) | Brunson (12) | Gray (8) | Target Center; 9,303 |
| Thurs Jul 5 | Chicago Sky | @ | Las Vegas Aces | LeaguePass, The U Too, ATTSN-RM | 80–84 LVA | McBride (28) | Swords (12) | Vandersloot (9) | Mandalay Bay Events Center; 4,699 |
| Thurs Jul 5 | Connecticut Sun | @ | Phoenix Mercury | LeaguePass, FSA+ | 77–84 PHO | Taurasi (25) | Bonner (13) | Turner (5) | Talking Stick Resort Arena; 8,599 |
| Fri Jul 6 | Seattle Storm | @ | Atlanta Dream | LeaguePass, FSSE-ATL | 95–86 ATL | Stewart (29) | Howard (11) | Bird (10) | McCamish Pavilion; 3,935 |
| Sat Jul 7 | Washington Mystics | @ | Los Angeles Sparks | LeaguePass, SpecSN, Monumental | 83–74 WAS | Gray (23) | Ogwumike (13) | Ogwumike (5) | Staples Center; 10,163 |
| Sat Jul 7 | Minnesota Lynx | @ | Chicago Sky | LeaguePass, The U Too | 63–77 CHI | Moore (16) | Fowles (13) | Vandersloot (9) | Wintrust Arena; 6,139 |
| Sat Jul 7 | Connecticut Sun | @ | Las Vegas Aces | LeaguePass, ATTSN-RM, WCCT | 90–94 LVA | Wilson (34) | Wilson (14) | Plum (10) | Mandalay Bay Events Center; 3,363 |
| Sun Jul 8 | Phoenix Mercury | @ | Atlanta Dream | LeaguePass, FSSE-ATL, FSA+ | 70–76 ATL | Taurasi (19) | Breland (12) | McCoughtry (4) | McCamish Pavilion; 3,952 |
| Sun Jul 8 | Dallas Wings | @ | New York Liberty | LeaguePass, MSG | 97–87 DAL | Diggins–Smith (32) | Cambage (12) | Gray (6) | Westchester County Center; 1,719 |
| Sun Jul 8 | Washington Mystics | @ | Seattle Storm | LeaguePass, KZJO-TV, Monumental | 91–97 SEA | Delle Donne (29) | Stewart (10) | Toliver (6) | KeyArena; 8,724 |
| Tues Jul 10 | Los Angeles Sparks | @ | Seattle Storm | Twitter, KZJO-TV, SpecSN | 77–75 (OT) LAS | Parker (21) | Stewart (13) | Parker (10) | KeyArena; 9,686 |
| Tues Jul 10 | Phoenix Mercury | @ | Dallas Wings | LeaguePass, FSSW-DAL+, FSA+ | 72–101 DAL | Griner (21) | Johnson (9) | Mitchell (8) | College Park Center; 4,034 |
| Tues Jul 10 | Las Vegas Aces | @ | Chicago Sky | LeaguePass, The U Too | 98–74 CHI | McBride (18) | 3 Tied (8) | Vandersloot (8) | Wintrust Arena; 7,696 |
| Wed Jul 11 | New York Liberty | @ | Connecticut Sun | NBA TV, NBCSB, MSG+ | 79–76 NYL | Charles (19) | Charles (11) | Boyd (8) | Mohegan Sun Arena; 7,413 |
| Wed Jul 11 | Atlanta Dream | @ | Washington Mystics | LeaguePass, Monumental | 106–89 ATL | McCoughtry (26) | Breland (10) | Breland (7) | Capital One Arena; 11,354 |
| Wed Jul 11 | Minnesota Lynx | @ | Indiana Fever | LeaguePass, WNDY | 87–65 MIN | Fowles (20) | Fowles (10) | Fowles (7) | Bankers Life Fieldhouse; 10,006 |
| Thurs Jul 12 | Dallas Wings | @ | Los Angeles Sparks | LeaguePass, MSG+ | 92–77 DAL | Diggins–Smith (22) | Tied (7) | Diggins–Smith (11) | Staples Center; 13,502 |
| Fri Jul 13 | Indiana Fever | @ | Atlanta Dream | LeaguePass, FSSE-ATL | 74–87 ATL | T. Mitchell (17) | Breland (8) | McCoughtry (7) | McCamish Pavilion; 3,807 |
| Fri Jul 13 | Phoenix Mercury | @ | Connecticut Sun | LeaguePass, NBCSB | 87–91 CON | Taurasi (28) | Williams (10) | A. Thomas (10) | Mohegan Sun Arena; 7,696 |
| Fri Jul 13 | Chicago Sky | @ | Washington Mystics | LeaguePass, NBCSWA, The U Too | 72–88 WAS | Tied (25) | Sanders (8) | Vandersloot (9) | Capital One Arena; 5,858 |
| Fri Jul 13 | Las Vegas Aces | @ | Minnesota Lynx | LeaguePass, FSNTH+ | 85–77 LVA | McBride (24) | Fowles (17) | McBride (9) | Target Center; 9,813 |
| Sat Jul 14 | Dallas Wings | @ | Seattle Storm | LeaguePass, KZJO-TV | 84–91 SEA | Stewart (35) | Stewart (10) | Diggins–Smith (7) | KeyArena; 9,686 |
| Sun Jul 15 | Washington Mystics | @ | Atlanta Dream | LeaguePass, FSSE-ATL, Monumental | 77–80 ATL | Delle Donne (23) | Delle Donne (11) | Toliver (6) | McCamish Pavilion; 3,880 |
| Sun Jul 15 | Chicago Sky | @ | New York Liberty | NBA TV, MSG | 84–107 NYL | Charles (21) | Vaughn (7) | Boyd (10) | Westchester County Center; 2,073 |
| Sun Jul 15 | Phoenix Mercury | @ | Indiana Fever | NBA TV, WNDY, FSA+ | 101–82 PHO | Griner (36) | Griner (12) | Taurasi (7) | Bankers Life Fieldhouse; 6,302 |
| Sun Jul 15 | Los Angeles Sparks | @ | Las Vegas Aces | LeaguePass, ATTSN-RM, SpecSN | 99–78 LAS | Parker (34) | Parker (11) | Parker (9) | Mandalay Bay Events Center; 4,810 |
| Sun Jul 15 | Connecticut Sun | @ | Minnesota Lynx | NBA TV, FSNTH, WCCT | 83–64 CON | Tuck (15) | Tied (8) | Clarendon (5) | Target Center; 9,234 |
| Tues Jul 17 | New York Liberty | @ | Dallas Wings | Twitter, FSSW-DAL+, MSG+ | 87–104 DAL | Cambage (53) | Cambage (10) | Diggins–Smith (7) | College Park Center; 6,459 |
| Tues Jul 17 | Atlanta Dream | @ | Connecticut Sun | LeaguePass, NBCSB | 86–83 ATL | McCoughtry (24) | Breland (11) | J. Thomas (6) | Mohegan Sun Arena; 5,555 |
| Wed Jul 18 | Seattle Storm | @ | Chicago Sky | LeaguePass | 101–83 SEA | Stewart (30) | Loyd (10) | Bird (11) | Wintrust Arena; 10,024 |
| Wed Jul 18 | Indiana Fever | @ | Minnesota Lynx | NBA TV, FSNTH GO | 65–89 MIN | Fowles (30) | Fowles (16) | Larkins (8) | Target Center; 17,933 |
| Thur Jul 19 | New York Liberty | @ | Atlanta Dream | ESPN3, MSG+ | 68–82 ATL | Montgomery (24) | Tied (12) | Boyd (10) | McCamish Pavilion; 3,074 |
| Thur Jul 19 | Washington Mystics | @ | Dallas Wings | ESPN2 | 81–90 DAL | Cambage (35) | Cambage (17) | Toliver (9) | College Park Center; 4,411 |
| Thur Jul 19 | Las Vegas Aces | @ | Phoenix Mercury | LeaguePass | 85–82 LVA | Taurasi (33) | Wilson (12) | Taurasi (6) | Talking Stick Resort Arena; 8,587 |
| Fri Jul 20 | Seattle Storm | @ | Connecticut Sun | NBA TV, NBCSB | 78–65 SEA | Loyd (31) | Ogwumike (12) | Tied (5) | Mohegan Sun Arena; 7,908 |
| Fri Jul 20 | Dallas Wings | @ | Chicago Sky | NBA TV, The U Too | 81–90 DAL | Tied (23) | Vandersloot (10) | Vandersloot (15) | Wintrust Arena; 4,962 |
| Fri Jul 20 | Indiana Fever | @ | Los Angeles Sparks | LeaguePass, SpecSN | 78–76 LAS | Parker (24) | Parker (12) | Parker (7) | Staples Center; 10,532 |
| Sat Jul 21 | Washington Mystics | @ | New York Liberty | NBA TV, MSG, Monumental | 95–78 WAS | Delle Donne (30) | Delle Donne (10) | Toliver (8) | Westchester County Center; 2,005 |
| Sat Jul 21 | Minnesota Lynx | @ | Phoenix Mercury | LeaguePass | 80–75 MIN | Moore (38) | Brunson (11) | Tied (3) | Talking Stick Resort Arena; 11,473 |
| Sun Jul 22 | Seattle Storm | @ | Atlanta Dream | NBA TV, FSSE-ATL | 74–87 ATL | Stewart (31) | Tied (8) | Bird (6) | McCamish Pavilion; 4,916 |
| Sun Jul 22 | Connecticut Sun | @ | Dallas Wings | LeaguePass, FSSW-DAL, WCCT | 92–75 DAL | Cambage (25) | Cambage (10) | J. Thomas (9) | College Park Center; 4,935 |
| Sun Jul 22 | Indiana Fever | @ | Las Vegas Aces | LeaguePass, ATTSN-RM | 74–88 LVA | Wilson (24) | Tied (10) | Pondexter (7) | Mandalay Bay Events Center; 5,368 |
| Sun Jul 22 | Los Angeles Sparks | @ | Chicago Sky | NBA TV, The U Too, SpecSN | 93–76 LAS | Parker (23) | Parker (12) | Vandersloot (10) | Wintrust Arena; 6,477 |
| Tues Jul 24 | Washington Mystics | @ | Connecticut Sun | ESPN3, NBCSB, Monumental | 68–94 CON | J. Jones (23) | Williams (10) | Williams (6) | Mohegan Sun Arena; 5,125 |
| Tues Jul 24 | Seattle Storm | @ | Indiana Fever | ESPN3 | 92–72 SEA | Tied (26) | Dupree (12) | Bird (11) | Bankers Life Fieldhouse; 5,908 |
| Tues Jul 24 | New York Liberty | @ | Minnesota Lynx | ESPN2 | 82–85 MIN | Charles (32) | Charles (15) | Boyd (9) | Target Center; 9,830 |
| Tues Jul 24 | Atlanta Dream | @ | Los Angeles Sparks | Twitter, SpecSN | 81–71 ATL | McCoughtry (19) | Parker (9) | Montgomery (6) | Staples Center; 9,324 |
| Wed Jul 25 | Chicago Sky | @ | Phoenix Mercury | LeaguePass | 101–87 CHI | Bonner (30) | Bonner (13) | Vandersloot (11) | Talking Stick Resort Arena; 10,338 |
| Sat Jul 28 | Team Delle Donne | @ | Team Parker | ABC | 112–119 CNP | Toliver (23) | Moore (8) | Tied (8) | Target Center; 15,922 |
| Tues Jul 31 | Washington Mystics | @ | Atlanta Dream | Twitter | 86–71 WAS | Delle Donne (28) | Delle Donne (16) | Toliver (4) | McCamish Pavilion; 3,648 |
| Tues Jul 31 | Chicago Sky | @ | Dallas Wings | NBA TV, FSSW-DAL+, The U Too | 92–91 DAL | Cambage (33) | Johnson (14) | Vandersloot (14) | College Park Center; 3,696 |
| Tues Jul 31 | Seattle Storm | @ | Phoenix Mercury | Twitter | 102–91 SEA | Loyd (29) | Howard (10) | Tied (7) | Talking Stick Resort Arena; 10,005 |

August

| Date | Matchup | | | TV | Result | High points | High rebounds | High assists | Location/Attendance |
|---|---|---|---|---|---|---|---|---|---|
| Wed Aug 1 | New York Liberty | @ | Connecticut Sun | NBA TV, NBCSB, MSG+ | 77–92 CON | J. Jones (21) | A. Thomas (12) | Boyd (8) | Mohegan Sun Arena; 6,412 |
| Wed Aug 1 | Phoenix Mercury | @ | Las Vegas Aces | NBA TV, ATTSN-RM | 104–93 PHO | Taurasi (37) | Bonner (14) | Taurasi (9) | Mandalay Bay Events Center; 5,129 |
| Thur Aug 2 | Dallas Wings | @ | Indiana Fever | NBA TV, FSIND, FSSW-DAL+ | 78–84 IND | Cambage (37) | Tied (9) | Wheeler (5) | Bankers Life Fieldhouse; 5,981 |
| Thur Aug 2 | Minnesota Lynx | @ | Los Angeles Sparks | ESPN2 | 57–79 LAS | Parker (23) | Parker (10) | Gray (9) | Staples Center; 9,542 |
| Fri Aug 3 | Chicago Sky | @ | Atlanta Dream | LeaguePass, FSSE-ATL, The U Too | 74–89 ATL | Vandersloot (21) | Breland (9) | Tied (7) | McCamish Pavilion; 5,120 |
| Fri Aug 3 | Las Vegas Aces | @ | Washington Mystics | None | LVA Forfeit | – | – | – | Capital One Arena – |
| Fri Aug 3 | Minnesota Lynx | @ | Seattle Storm | NBA TV, KZJO-TV | 75–85 SEA | Tied (20) | Fowles (16) | Bird (11) | KeyArena; 12,064 |
| Sat Aug 4 | Indiana Fever | @ | New York Liberty | NBA TV, MSG | 68–55 IND | Dupree (25) | Achonwa (13) | Wheeler (7) | Westchester County Center; 2,225 |
| Sat Aug 5 | Las Vegas Aces | @ | Connecticut Sun | LeaguePass, NBCSB | 88–109 CON | J. Thomas (30) | Tied (7) | Williams (5) | Mohegan Sun Arena; 6,791 |
| Sat Aug 5 | Washington Mystics | @ | Dallas Wings | NBA TV, FSSW-DAL+, Monumental | 76–74 WAS | Tied (16) | Powers (5) | Toliver (5) | College Park Center; 5,623 |
| Sat Aug 5 | Phoenix Mercury | @ | Los Angeles Sparks | NBA TV, SpecSN | 75–78 LAS | Gray (24) | Parker (14) | January (9) | Staples Center; 19,076 |
| Sat Aug 5 | Atlanta Dream | @ | Minnesota Lynx | LeaguePass, FSNTH, FSSE-ATL | 86–66 ATL | Hayes (28) | Fowles (10) | Sykes (6) | Target Center; 9,333 |
| Mon Aug 6 | Seattle Storm | @ | New York Liberty | NBA TV, MSG+ | 96–80 NYL | Stewart (32) | Howard (10) | Tied (7) | Madison Square Garden; 12,488 |
| Tues Aug 7 | Las Vegas Aces | @ | Atlanta Dream | NBA TV, FSSO | 100–109 ATL | Tied (22) | Breland (11) | Plum (8) | McCamish Pavilion; 4,033 |
| Tues Aug 7 | Seattle Storm | @ | Indiana Fever | LeaguePass, FSIND | 94–79 SEA | Dupree (22) | Stewart (12) | Tied (8) | Bankers Life Fieldhouse; 6,401 |
| Tues Aug 7 | Minnesota Lynx | @ | Chicago Sky | Twitter, The U Too | 85–64 MIN | Moore (31) | Fowles (11) | Robinson (11) | Wintrust Arena; 6,388 |
| Tues Aug 7 | Washington Mystics | @ | Phoenix Mercury | NBA TV, Monumental | 103–98 WAS | Griner (35) | Griner (11) | Tied (6) | Talking Stick Resort Arena; 7,769 |
| Wed Aug 8 | Los Angeles Sparks | @ | New York Liberty | LeaguePass, MSG+, SpecSN | 82–81 LAS | Charles (27) | Stokes (11) | Boyd (7) | Westchester County Center; 2,481 |
| Wed Aug 8 | Connecticut Sun | @ | Dallas Wings | NBA TV, FSSW-DAL | 101–92 CON | Cambage (29) | Williams (10) | J. Thomas (9) | College Park Center; 3,483 |
| Thurs Aug 9 | Seattle Storm | @ | Washington Mystics | NBA TV, Monumental | 77–100 WAS | Delle Donne (30) | Sanders (12) | Cloud (8) | Capital One Arena; 6,808 |
| Thurs Aug 9 | Los Angeles Sparks | @ | Atlanta Dream | NBA TV, FSSO | 73–79 ATL | Parker (20) | Parker (12) | Bentley (8) | McCamish Pavilion; 4,235 |
| Thurs Aug 9 | Minnesota Lynx | @ | Las Vegas Aces | NBA TV, ATTSN-RM | 89–73 MIN | Moore (34) | Fowles (19) | Wright (6) | Mandalay Bay Arena; 4,497 |
| Fri Aug 10 | Connecticut Sun | @ | Chicago Sky | LeaguePass, The U Too, NBCSB | 86–97 CHI | Vandersloot (20) | Coates (10) | Vandersloot (15) | Wintrust Arena; 5,976 |
| Fri Aug 10 | Indiana Fever | @ | Phoenix Mercury | NBA TV, FSA+, FSIND | 74–94 PHO | K. Mitchell (20) | Bonner (10) | Tied (4) | Talking Stick Resort Arena; 8,860 |
| Sat Aug 11 | Dallas Wings | @ | Atlanta Dream | NBA TV, FSSE-ATL, FSSW-DAL+ | 72–92 ATL | Diggins-Smith (26) | Williams (9) | Diggins-Smith (10) | McCamish Pavilion; 4,937 |
| Sat Aug 11 | Indiana Fever | @ | Las Vegas Aces | LeaguePass, ATTSN-RM | 74–92 LVA | Plum (20) | Wilson (8) | Wheeler (5) | Mandalay Bay Events Center; 5,213 |
| Sun Aug 12 | Atlanta Dream | @ | New York Liberty | LeaguePass, MSG | 86–77 ATL | Montgomery (30) | Stokes (10) | Charles (5) | Westchester County Center; 2,362 |
| Sun Aug 12 | Chicago Sky | @ | Connecticut Sun | LeaguePass, NBCSB | 75–82 CON | Williams (22) | J. Jones (15) | J. Thomas (8) | Mohegan Sun Arena; 7,687 |
| Sun Aug 12 | Dallas Wings | @ | Washington Mystics | NBA TV, NBCSWA | 80–93 WAS | Atkins (26) | Gray (12) | Toliver (7) | Capital One Arena; 6,362 |
| Sun Aug 12 | Los Angeles Sparks | @ | Phoenix Mercury | ESPN2 | 78–86 PHO | Bonner (31) | Griner (13) | Taurasi (14) | Talking Stick Resort Arena; 10,618 |
| Sun Aug 12 | Seattle Storm | @ | Minnesota Lynx | ESPN3, FSNTH | 81–72 MIN | Fowles (28) | Stewart (17) | Tied (6) | Target Center; 9,123 |
| Tues Aug 14 | Dallas Wings | @ | Connecticut Sun | Twitter, NBCSB | 76–96 CON | Diggins–Smith (17) | J. Jones (10) | Diggins–Smith (6) | Capital One Arena; 6,362 |
| Tues Aug 14 | Chicago Sky | @ | Minnesota Lynx | NBA TV, FSNTH GO, The U Too | 91–88 CHI | Dolson (20) | Fowles (13) | Vandersloot (7) | Mohegan Sun Arena; 7,687 |
| Tues Aug 14 | New York Liberty | @ | Los Angeles Sparks | NBA TV, SpecSN, MSG+ | 66–74 LAS | Gray (26) | Parker (10) | Gray (5) | Staples Center; 11,067 |
| Wed Aug 15 | Washington Mystics | @ | Indiana Fever | NBA TV, Monumental | 76–62 WAS | Delle Donne (25) | Sanders (13) | Cloud (7) | Bankers Life Fieldhouse; 7,636 |
| Wed Aug 15 | New York Liberty | @ | Las Vegas Aces | NBA TV, ATTSN-RM, MSG+ | 91–88 CHI | Wilson (19) | Stokes (11) | Boyd (6) | Mandalay Bay Events Center; 7,159 |
| Fri Aug 17 | Minnesota Lynx | @ | Connecticut Sun | LeaguePass, NBCSB | 79–96 CON | J. Jones (26) | Tied (8) | Tied (8) | Mohegan Sun Arena; 7,089 |
| Fri Aug 17 | Los Angeles Sparks | @ | Washington Mystics | NBA TV, Monumental, SpecSN | 67–69 WAS | Delle Donne (16) | Tied (10) | Parker (7) | Capital One Arena; 7,400 |
| Fri Aug 17 | Las Vegas Aces | @ | Dallas Wings | LeaguePass, FSSW-DAL+ | 102–107 DAL | Cambage (43) | Cambage (13) | McBride (12) | College Park Center; 6,209 |
| Fri Aug 17 | Atlanta Dream | @ | Phoenix Mercury | LeaguePass | 95–104 PHO | Bonner (31) | Griner (13) | Taurasi (14) | Talking Stick Resort Arena; 10,618 |
| Fri Aug 17 | New York Liberty | @ | Seattle Storm | NBA TV, KZJO-TV, MSG+ | 77–85 SEA | Stewart (22) | Tied (15) | Bird (6) | KeyArena; 10,873 |
| Sat Aug 18 | Chicago Sky | @ | Indiana Fever | NBA TV, FSIND | 115–106 CHI | Dupree (30) | Achonwa (11) | Vandersloot(10) | Bankers Life Fieldhouse; 8,442 |
| Sun Aug 19 | Los Angeles Sparks | @ | Connecticut Sun | Twitter, NBCSB, SpecSN | 86–89 CON | J. Thomas (27) | Parker (10) | Tied (7) | Mohegan Sun Arena; 8,040 |
| Sun Aug 19 | Atlanta Dream | @ | Las Vegas Aces | ESPN3, ATTSN-RM | 93–78 ATL | Wilson (21) | Hamby (8) | Montgomery (8) | Mandalay Bay Events Center; 5,737 |
| Sun Aug 19 | New York Liberty | @ | Phoenix Mercury | ESPN3, MSG+ | 85–96 PHO | Nurse (28) | Bonner (10) | Boyd (7) | Talking Stick Resort Arena; 13,106 |
| Sun Aug 19 | Indiana Fever | @ | Chicago Sky | ESPN3, The U Too | 97–92 IND | DeShields (27) | Achonwa (9) | Vandersloot (7) | Wintrust Arena; 7,118 |
| Sun Aug 19 | Dallas Wings | @ | Seattle Storm | ESPN3, KZJO-TV | 68–84 SEA | Johnson (16) | Russell (9) | Canada (5) | KeyArena; 12,574 |
| Sun Aug 19 | Washington Mystics | @ | Minnesota Lynx | ESPN2 | 83–88 MIN | Fowles (26) | Fowles (14) | Whalen (6) | Target Center; 13,013 |

2018 WNBA postseason
First Round

| Date | Time (ET) | Matchup | | | TV | Result | High points | High rebounds | High assists | Location/Attendance |
|---|---|---|---|---|---|---|---|---|---|---|
| Tues Aug 21 | 8:30 PM | Dallas Wings | @ | Phoenix Mercury | ESPN2 | 83–101 PHO | Bonner (29) | Cambage (12) | Taurasi (12) | Wells Fargo Arena; 4,976 |
| Tues Aug 21 | 10:30 PM | Minnesota Lynx | @ | Los Angeles Sparks | ESPN2 | 68–75 LAS | Gray (26) | Fowles (12) | Gray (6) | Staples Center; 8,598 |

Second Round

| Date | Time (ET) | Matchup | | | TV | Result | High points | High rebounds | High assists | Location/Attendance |
|---|---|---|---|---|---|---|---|---|---|---|
| Thur Aug. 23 | 6:30 PM | Los Angeles Sparks | @ | Washington Mystics | ESPN2 | 64–96 WAS | Delle Donne (19) | Delle Donne (12) | Toliver (9) | Charles Smith Center; 3,548 |
| Thur Aug. 23 | 8:30 PM | Phoenix Mercury | @ | Connecticut Sun | ESPN2 | 96–86 PHO | 3 Tied (27) | Bonner (18) | J. Jones (7) | Mohegan Sun Arena; 7,858 |

Semifinals

| Date | Time (EST) | Matchup | | | TV | Result | High points | High rebounds | High assists | Location/Attendance |
|---|---|---|---|---|---|---|---|---|---|---|
| Sun Aug 26 | 3:00 PM | Washington Mystics | @ | Atlanta Dream | ESPN2 | 87–84 WAS | Delle Donne (32) | Delle Donne (13) | Cloud (6) | McCamish Pavilion; 5,086 |
| Sun Aug 26 | 5:00 PM | Phoenix Mercury | @ | Seattle Storm | ESPN2 | 87–91 SEA | Stewart (28) | Bonner (13) | Bird (10) | KeyArena; 9,686 |
| Tues Aug 28 | 8:00 PM | Washington Mystics | @ | Atlanta Dream | ESPN2 | 75–78 ATL | Delle Donne (27) | Tied (14) | Tied (6) | McCamish Pavilion; 3,813 |
| Tues Aug 28 | 10:00 PM | Phoenix Mercury | @ | Seattle Storm | ESPN2 | 87–91 (OT) SEA | Taurasi (28) | Tied (10) | Taurasi (8) | KeyArena; 9,686 |
| Fri Aug 31 | 8:00 PM | Atlanta Dream | @ | Washington Mystics | ESPNNews, NBA TV | 81–76 ATL | Hayes (23) | Tied (11) | Kristi Toliver (6) | Charles Smith Center; 3,867 |
| Fri Aug 31 | 10:00 PM | Seattle Storm | @ | Phoenix Mercury | ESPNNews, NBA TV | 86–66 PHO | Bonner (27) | Tied (11) | Bird (11) | Talking Stick Resort Arena; 15,185 |
| Sun Sep 2 | 3:00 PM | Atlanta Dream | @ | Washington Mystics | ESPN2 | 97–76 WAS | Toliver (22) | Delle Donne (10) | Montgomery (10) | Charles Smith Center; 3,722 |
| Sun Sep 2 | 5:00 PM | Seattle Storm | @ | Phoenix Mercury | ESPN2 | 84–86 PHO | Griner (29) | Griner (12) | Loyd (12) | Talking Stick Resort Arena; 8,137 |
| Tues Sep 4 | 8:00 PM | Washington Mystics | @ | Atlanta Dream | ESPN2 | 86–81 WAS | Atkins (20) | Breland (12) | Natasha Cloud (5) | McCamish Pavilion; 4,435 |
| Tues Sep 4 | 10:00 PM | Phoenix Mercury | @ | Seattle Storm | ESPNNews, NBA TV | 94–84 SEA | Stewart (28) | Alysha Clark (13) | Griner (6) | KeyArena; 8,992 |

WNBA Finals

| Date | Time (ET) | Matchup | | | TV | Result | High points | High rebounds | High assists | Location/Attendance |
|---|---|---|---|---|---|---|---|---|---|---|
| September 7 | 9:00 PM | Washington Mystics | @ | Seattle Storm | ESPNews | 76–89 SEA | Tied (23) | Tied (7) | Bird (7) | KeyArena; 11,486 |
| September 9 | 3:30 PM | Washington Mystics | @ | Seattle Storm | ABC | 73–75 SEA | Stewart (19) | Howard (11) | Bird (4) | KeyArena; 14,212 |
| September 12 | 8:00 PM | Seattle Storm | @ | Washington Mystics | ESPN2 | 98–82 SEA | Stewart (30) | Howard (14) | Bird (10) | EagleBank Arena; 9,164 |

== Playoffs ==
**First round** Single elimination (Aug. 21)
5 | **Phoenix Mercury** | **101**
8 | Dallas Wings | 83
6 | **Los Angeles Sparks** | **75**
7 | Minnesota Lynx | 68

**Second round** Single elimination (Aug. 23)
4 | Connecticut Sun | 86
5 | **Phoenix Mercury** | **96**
3 | **Washington Mystics** | **96**
6 | Los Angeles Sparks | 64

**Semifinals**; Best-of-5 (Aug. 26 – Sept. 4)
1 | **Seattle Storm** | **3**
5 | Phoenix Mercury | 2
2 | Atlanta Dream | 2
3 | **Washington Mystics** | **3**

**WNBA Finals**; Best-of-5 (Sept. 7 – Sept. 12)
1 | **Seattle Storm** | **3**
3 | Washington Mystics | 0

Note: Teams re-seeded after second round and semi-finals.

- **Bold** – Game or series winner
- Italic – Team with home-court advantage

== Awards ==
=== Individual ===
| Award | | Winner | Team | Position | Votes/Statistic |
|---|---|---|---|---|---|
| Most Valuable Player (MVP) | | Breanna Stewart | Seattle Storm | Forward | 33 of 39 |
| Finals MVP | | Breanna Stewart | Seattle Storm | Forward | – of – |
| Rookie of the Year | | A'ja Wilson | Las Vegas Aces | Power Forward | 39 of 39 |
| Most Improved Player | | Natasha Howard | Seattle Storm | Forward | 29 of 39 |
| Defensive Player of the Year | | Alana Beard | Los Angeles Sparks | Guard | 16 of 39 |
| Sixth Woman of the Year | | Jonquel Jones | Connecticut Sun | Forward/center | 20 of 38 |
| Kim Perrot Sportsmanship Award | | Sue Bird | Seattle Storm | Guard | 16 of 38 |
| Peak Performers | **Scoring** | Liz Cambage | Dallas Wings | Center | 23.0 PPG |
| Peak Performers | **Rebounding** | Sylvia Fowles | Minnesota Lynx | Center | 11.8 RPG |
| Peak Performers | **Assists** | Courtney Vandersloot | Chicago Sky | Guard | 8.6 APG |
| Coach of the Year | | Nicki Collen | Atlanta Dream | Coach | 37 of 39 |
| Basketball Executive of the Year | | Chris Sienko | Atlanta Dream | General manager | 6 of 11 |

=== Team ===
| Award | | Guard | Guard | Forward | Forward | Center |
|---|---|---|---|---|---|---|
| **All-WNBA** | **First Team** | Diana Taurasi | Tiffany Hayes | Elena Delle Donne | Breanna Stewart | Liz Cambage |
| **All-WNBA** | **Second Team** | Skylar Diggins-Smith | Courtney Vandersloot | Candace Parker | Maya Moore | Brittney Griner |
| **All-Defensive** | **First Team** | Jasmine Thomas | Alana Beard | Jessica Breland | Natasha Howard | Brittney Griner |
| **All-Defensive** | **Second Team** | Tiffany Hayes | Ariel Atkins | Nneka Ogwumike | Rebekkah Brunson | Sylvia Fowles |
| **All-Rookie Team** | | Kelsey Mitchell | Ariel Atkins | Diamond DeShields | Azurá Stevens | A'ja Wilson |

=== Players of the Week ===
| Week ending | Eastern Conference | | Western Conference | |
| Week ending | Player | Team | Player | Team |
|---|---|---|---|---|
| May 27 | Alyssa Thomas | Connecticut Sun | Chelsea Gray | Los Angeles Sparks |
| June 3 | Tina Charles | New York Liberty | Liz Cambage | Dallas Wings |
| June 10 | Tiffany Hayes | Atlanta Dream | Brittney Griner | Phoenix Mercury |
| June 17 | Elena Delle Donne | Washington Mystics | Breanna Stewart | Seattle Storm |
| June 24 | Angel McCoughtry | Atlanta Dream | Maya Moore (2) | Minnesota Lynx |
| July 2 | Elena Delle Donne (3) | Washington Mystics | Maya Moore (2) | Minnesota Lynx |
| July 9 | Elena Delle Donne (3) | Washington Mystics | A'ja Wilson | Las Vegas Aces |
| July 16 | Jessica Breland | Atlanta Dream | Candace Parker | Los Angeles Sparks |
| July 23 | Tiffany Hayes (3) | Atlanta Dream | Liz Cambage (2) | Dallas Wings |
| August 6 | Tiffany Hayes (3) | Atlanta Dream | Candace Parker (2) | Los Angeles Sparks |
| August 13 | Elena Delle Donne (4) | Washington Mystics | Maya Moore (3) | Minnesota Lynx |
| August 20 | Jonquel Jones | Connecticut Sun | DeWanna Bonner | Phoenix Mercury |

=== Players of the Month ===
| Month | Eastern Conference | | Western Conference | |
| Month | Player | Team | Player | Team |
|---|---|---|---|---|
| June | Elena Delle Donne | Washington Mystics | Diana Taurasi | Phoenix Mercury |
| July | Tiffany Hayes | Atlanta Dream | Breanna Stewart | Seattle Storm |
| August | Elena Delle Donne (2) | Washington Mystics | Diana Taurasi (2) | Phoenix Mercury |

=== Rookies of the Month ===
| Month | Player | Team |
|---|---|---|
| June | A'ja Wilson (3) | Las Vegas Aces |
| July | A'ja Wilson (3) | Las Vegas Aces |
| August | A'ja Wilson (3) | Las Vegas Aces |

=== Coaches of the Month ===
| Month | Coach | Team |
|---|---|---|
| June | Sandy Brondello | Phoenix Mercury |
| July | Nicki Collen (2) | Atlanta Dream |
| August | Nicki Collen (2) | Atlanta Dream |

== Coaches ==
=== Eastern Conference ===
| Team | Head coach | Previous job | Years with team | Record with team | Playoff appearances | Finals Appearances | WNBA Championships |
|---|---|---|---|---|---|---|---|
| Atlanta Dream | Nicki Collen | Connecticut Sun (assistant) | 1 | 23-11 | 1 | 0 | 0 |
| Chicago Sky | Amber Stocks | Los Angeles Sparks (assistant) | 2 | 35–43 | 0 | 0 | 0 |
| Connecticut Sun | Curt Miller | Los Angeles Sparks (assistant) | 3 | 56–46 | 2 | 0 | 0 |
| Indiana Fever | Pokey Chatman | Chicago Sky | 2 | 15–53 | 0 | 0 | 0 |
| New York Liberty | Katie Smith | New York Liberty (assistant) | 1 | 7–27 | 0 | 0 | 0 |
| Washington Mystics | Mike Thibault | Connecticut Sun | 6 | 104–100 | 5 | 1 | 0 |

=== Western Conference ===
| Team | Head coach | Previous job | Years with team | Record with team | Playoff appearances | Finals Appearances | WNBA Championships |
|---|---|---|---|---|---|---|---|
| Dallas Wings | Fred Williams | Atlanta Dream | 4 | 72–97 | 3 | 0 | 0 |
| Las Vegas Aces | Bill Laimbeer | New York Liberty | 1 | 14–20 | 0 | 0 | 0 |
| Los Angeles Sparks | Brian Agler | Seattle Storm | 4 | 75–54 | 3 | 2 | 1 |
| Minnesota Lynx | Cheryl Reeve | Detroit Shock (assistant) | 8 | 213–93 | 7 | 6 | 4 |
| Phoenix Mercury | Sandy Brondello | Los Angeles Sparks (assistant) | 5 | 103–67 | 5 | 1 | 1 |
| Seattle Storm | Dan Hughes | San Antonio Stars | 1 | 26–8 | 1 | 1 | 0 |

Notes:

- Year with team includes 2018 season.
- Records are from time at current team and are through the end the 2018 season.
- Playoff appearances are from time at current team only.
- WNBA Finals and Championships do not include time with other teams.
- Coaches shown are the coaches who began the 2018 season as head coach of each team.
