= 2018–19 WABA League Regular season =

The WABA League is a top-level regional basketball league, featuring female teams from Serbia, Montenegro, Bosnia and Herzegovina, Bulgaria, Slovenia and Croatia. In the Regular season was played with 8 teams and play a dual circuit system, each with each one game at home and away. The four best teams at the end of the regular season were placed in the Final Four. The regular season began on 3 October 2018 and it will end on 6 March 2019.

== Standings ==
| Pos | Team | Pld | W | L | PF | PA | PD | Pts | Qualification or relegation |
|---|---|---|---|---|---|---|---|---|---|
| 1 | (Bulgaria) Beroe | 14 | 11 | 3 | 1072 | 986 | +86 | 25 | Advance to the Final Four |
| 2 | (Serbia) Crvena zvezda Kombank | 14 | 11 | 3 | 1032 | 939 | +93 | 25 | Advance to the Final Four |
| 3 | (Montenegro) Budućnost Bemax | 14 | 10 | 4 | 1140 | 890 | +250 | 24 | Advance to the Final Four |
| 4 | (Slovenia) Cinkarna Celje | 14 | 9 | 5 | 1136 | 916 | +220 | 23 | Advance to the Final Four |
| 5 | (Bulgaria) Montana 2003 | 14 | 9 | 5 | 1097 | 1046 | +51 | 23 | |
| 6 | (Slovenia) Triglav Kranj | 14 | 4 | 10 | 862 | 1040 | −178 | 18 | |
| 7 | (Bosnia and Herzegovina) RMU Banovići | 14 | 2 | 12 | 950 | 1104 | −154 | 16 | |
| 8 | (Croatia) Trešnjevka 2009 | 14 | 0 | 14 | 765 | 1133 | −368 | 14 | |

Updated to match(es) played on February 14, 2019. Source: WABA League

== Fixtures and results ==
All times given below are in Central European Time (for the matches played in Bulgaria is time expressed in Eastern European Time).

=== Game 1 ===
4 October 2018
20:30

Report

| Triglav Kranj | 52–83 | Cinkarna Celje |
Scoring by quarter: 14:22, 9:19, 15:23, 14:19
| Pts: Žibert 20; Rebs: Omerbašić 5 Asts: Žibert 5 | | Pts: Bessard 23; Rebs: White 10; Asts: Friškovec 6 |

Sports Hall Planina, Kranj
Attendance: 1
Referees: Gajšek, Mauer, Kuzmin

4 October 2018
19:00

Report

| Budućnost Bemax | 74–46 | RMU Banovići |
Scoring by quarter: 26:11, 12:15, 16:7, 20:13
| Pts: Babić 15; Rebs: Babić, Bura 10; Asts: Mitrašinović 7 | | Pts: Musić 18; Rebs: Dušanić 6 Asts: Jozić 3 |

University Sports&Culture Hall, Podgorica
Attendance: 200
Referees: Bajramović, Mjeda, Čanković

3 October 2018
18:30

Report

| Montana 2003 | 84–64 | Trešnjevka 2009 |
Scoring by quarter: 23:23, 20:13, 20:14, 21:14
| Pts: Manuel 22; Rebs: three players 7 Asts: Dubrovina, Georgieva 5 | | Pts: Royo Torres 24; Rebs: Royo Torres 8 Asts: Mühl 11 |

Mladost, Montana
Attendance: 600
Referees: Vesković, Miloradović, Pešić

3 October 2018
17:30

Report

| Crvena zvezda | 90–74 | Beroe |
Scoring by quarter: 24:23, 30:16, 18:12, 18:23
| Pts: Bogićević 25; Rebs: A. Katanić 6 Asts: A. Katanić 10 | | Pts: Lewis, Poček 26; Rebs: Poček 20; Asts: Konstantinova 4 |

Železnik Hall, Belgrade
Attendance: 100
Referees: Katić, Mikulić, Hartman

=== Game 2 ===
10 October 2018
18:00

Report

| Beroe | 80–78 | Budućnost Bemax |
Scoring by quarter: 23:26, 22:13, 14:20, 21:19
| Pts: Chong 16; Rebs: Poček 10; Asts: Poček 5 | | Pts: Džebo 16; Rebs: Džebo 6 Asts: Bura 9 |

Municipal Hall, Stara Zagora
Attendance: 150
Referees: Arsenijević, Pešić, Miloradović

10 October 2018
18:00

Report

| RMU Banovići | 80–83 | Triglav Kranj |
Scoring by quarter: 28:22, 13:20, 19:17, 20:24
| Pts: Lačić 21; Rebs: Jozić 10; Asts: Musić 7 | | Pts: Žibert 22; Rebs: Šarić 8 Asts: Žibert 4 |

SKC Banovići, Banovići
Attendance: 500
Referees: Mikulić, Katić, Grubišić

10 October 2018
18:00

Report

| Cinkarna Celje | 85–68 | Montana 2003 |
Scoring by quarter: 21:16, 23:13, 23:19, 18:20
| Pts: White 21; Rebs: White 11; Asts: Friškovec 11 | | Pts: Manuel 17; Rebs: Georgieva 6 Asts: Dubrovina 8 |

Hall Gimnazija Center Celje, Celje
Attendance: 150
Referees: Adamović, Skenderija, Srdić

=== Game 3 ===
18 October 2018
21:00

Report

| Trešnjevka 2009 | 56–80 | Cinkarna Celje |
Scoring by quarter: 15:27, 10:20, 21:22, 10:11
| Pts: three players 13; Rebs: Džankić 9 Asts: Mühl 9 | | Pts: Ocvirk 18; Rebs: Ocvirk 9 Asts: Ocvirk 6 |

Dom sportova 2, Zagreb
Attendance: 100
Referees: Pelja, Bajgorić, Hasić

18 October 2018
20:30

Report

| Triglav Kranj | 65–78 | Beroe |
Scoring by quarter: 17:19, 15:19, 17:31, 16:9
| Pts: Abramovič 21; Rebs: Abramovič 8 Asts: Žibert 5 | | Pts: Poček 25; Rebs: Lewis 12; Asts: Aleksić 11 |

Sports Hall Planina, Kranj
Attendance: 100
Referees: Mustapić, Galić, Gracin

17 October 2018
18:30

Report

| Montana 2003 | 98–86 | RMU Banovići |
Scoring by quarter: 16:20, 24:19, 30:22, 28:25
| Pts: Ivanova 28; Rebs: Georgieva 11; Asts: Sharenkapova 8 | | Pts: Zubac 26; Rebs: Glotić 9 Asts: Musić, Dušanić 4 |

Mladost, Montana
Attendance: 600
Referees: Milojević, Matić, Živković

=== Game 4 ===
27 October 2018
20:30

Report

| Beroe | 81–72 | Montana 2003 |
Scoring by quarter: 19:16, 22:18, 21:15, 19:23
| Pts: Lewis 24; Rebs: Lewis 12; Asts: Aleksić 6 | | Pts: Dimitrova 23; Rebs: Dimitrova 7 Asts: Manuel 6 |

Municipal Hall, Stara Zagora
Attendance: 250
Referees: Vesković, Matić, Pešić

24 October 2018
18:30

Report

| RMU Banovići | 65–60 | Trešnjevka 2009 |
Scoring by quarter: 11:8, 16:16, 14:20, 24:16
| Pts: three players 13; Rebs: Zubac 16; Asts: Musić 7 | | Pts: Džankić 16; Rebs: Mühl 10; Asts: Mühl 11 |

SKC Banovići, Banovići
Attendance: n / a
Referees: Vesković, Čalić, Vlahović

24 October 2018
17:30

Report

| Crvena zvezda | 61–51 | Budućnost Bemax |
Scoring by quarter: 22:8, 17:14, 14:15, 8:14
| Pts: Bogićević 13; Rebs: Topuzović 8 Asts: I. Katanič 5 | | Pts: Kapor 13; Rebs: Džebo 6 Asts: Bura 7 |

Železnik Hall, Belgrade
Attendance: 100
Referees: Holjevac, Katić, Mikulić

=== Game 5 ===
1 November 2018
18:00

Report

| Triglav Kranj | 68–76 | Crvena zvezda |
Scoring by quarter: 15:26, 15:15, 19:20, 19:15
| Pts: Abramovič 22; Rebs: Šarić 7 Asts: Žibert 7 | | Pts: Đorđević 21; Rebs: A. Katanić 8 Asts: A. Katanić 10 |

Sports Hall Planina, Kranj
Attendance: 180
Referees: Marunica, Vukojević, Anzulović

26 November 2018
16:30

Report

| Trešnjevka 2009 | 66–94 | Beroe |
Scoring by quarter: 18:23, 16:23, 19:26, 13:22
| Pts: Clark 20; Rebs: Clark 7 Asts: Bilikova 5 | | Pts: Poček 21; Rebs: Poček 11; Asts: three players 4 |

Dom sportova 2, Zagreb
Attendance: 50
Referees: Mauer, Škrbec, Kuzmin

2 November 2018
18:00

Report

| Cinkarna Celje | 92–74 | RMU Banovići |
Scoring by quarter: 38:19, 25:16, 17:20, 12:19
| Pts: Friškovec 24; Rebs: Marić 12; Asts: Delić 10 | | Pts: Zubac 22; Rebs: Zubac, Dušanić 6 Asts: Ikanović 6 |

Hall Gimnazija Center Celje, Celje
Attendance: 100
Referees: Žagar, Đuraki, Miletić

=== Game 6 ===
2 December 2018
18:00

Report

| Beroe | 79–74 | Cinkarna Celje |
Scoring by quarter: 23:29, 19:9, 15:22, 22:14
| Pts: Poček 19; Rebs: Poček 14; Asts: Poček 7 | | Pts: Bessard 23; Rebs: Ocvirk 10; Asts: Delić, Friškovec 7 |

Municipal Hall, Stara Zagora
Attendance: 150
Referees: Matić, Pešić, Miloradović

8 November 2018
17:30

Report

| Crvena zvezda | 77–67 | Montana 2003 |
Scoring by quarter: 20:18, 19:21, 20:12, 18:16
| Pts: Bogićević 24; Rebs: Đorđević 7 Asts: I. Katanič 7 | | Pts: Ivanova 26; Rebs: Manuel 9 Asts: Dubrovina 6 |

Železnik Hall, Belgrade
Attendance: 100
Referees: Katić, Mikulić, Barišić

8 November 2018
18:30

Report

| Budućnost Bemax | 83–45 | Triglav Kranj |
Scoring by quarter: 20:12, 23:9, 25:9, 15:15
| Pts: Babić 16; Rebs: Džebo 8 Asts: Kapor, Živković 4 | | Pts: Abramovič 15; Rebs: Žibert, Sarić 5 Asts: Abramovič 5 |

University Sports&Culture Hall, Podgorica
Attendance: 400
Referees: Panov, Zlatevski, Petrovski

=== Game 7 ===
28 November 2018
18:30

Report

| Montana 2003 | 102–100 (OT) | Budućnost Bemax |
Scoring by quarter: 24:21, 13:18, 21:12, 16:23, Overtime: 13:13, 15:13
| Pts: Georgieva 21; Rebs: Georgieva 14; Asts: Dubrovina 10 | | Pts: Babić 26; Rebs: Džebo 10; Asts: Babić 6 |

Mladost, Montana
Attendance: 500
Referees: Matić, Pešić, Čalić

29 November 2018
19:00

Report

| Trešnjevka 2009 | 58–86 | Crvena zvezda |
Scoring by quarter: 14:23, 8:24, 12:20, 24:19
| Pts: Mühl 14; Rebs: Bilikova 9 Asts: Mühl 6 | | Pts: Đorđević 21; Rebs: Bojović 7 Asts: A. Katanić 9 |

Dom sportova 2, Zagreb
Attendance: 50
Referees: Nikšić, Kadrić, Balaš

27 November 2018
18:00

Report

| RMU Banovići | 71–80 | Beroe |
Scoring by quarter: 21:23, 14:21, 16:20, 20:16
| Pts: Zubac 25; Rebs: Zubac 12; Asts: Jozić, Ikanović 7 | | Pts: Poček 20; Rebs: Poček 21; Asts: four players 4 |

SKC Banovići, Banovići
Attendance: n / a
Referees: Arsenijević, Virijević, Vlahović

=== Game 8 ===
26 December 2018
16:30

Report

| Crvena zvezda | 81–73 (OT) | Cinkarna Celje |
Scoring by quarter: 19:20, 20:12, 17:23, 13:14, Overtime: 12:4
| Pts: Bogićević 20; Rebs: Đorđević 12; Asts: A. Katanić, I. Katanič 5 | | Pts: Bessard 24; Rebs: White 9 Asts: Krošelj, Friškovec 8 |

Železnik Hall, Belgrade
Attendance: 100
Referees: Adamović, Babić, Skenderija

5 December 2018
19:00

Report

| Budućnost Bemax | 95–16 | Trešnjevka 2009 |
Scoring by quarter: 23:10, 28:0, 35:5, 9:1
| Pts: Babić 17; Rebs: Živković 8 Asts: Babić 5 | | Pts: Pavić, Savić 4 Rebs: Pavić 6 Asts: Bilić 2 |

University Sports&Culture Hall, Podgorica
Attendance: 350
Referees: Bajgorić, Hasić, Bambur

5 December 2018
18:30

Report

| Triglav Kranj | 62–79 | Montana 2003 |
Scoring by quarter: 13:24, 12:19, 15:21, 22:15
| Pts: Abramovič 18; Rebs: Prevodnik 7 Asts: Prevodnik 8 | | Pts: Manuel 27; Rebs: Dimitrova, Georgieva 8 Asts: Ivanova 5 |

Sports Hall Planina, Kranj
Attendance: 150
Referees: Galić, Gracin, Mustapić

=== Game 9 ===
12 December 2018
19:00

Report

| Trešnjevka 2009 | 52–64 | Triglav Kranj |
Scoring by quarter: 15:17, 11:10, 13:19, 13:18
| Pts: Mühl 11; Rebs: Clark 9 Asts: Mühl 3 | | Pts: Abramovič 17; Rebs: Jakobčič 7 Asts: Abramovič 7 |

Dom sportova 2, Zagreb
Attendance: 50
Referees: Adamović, Skenderija, Vavan

16 December 2018
17:00

Report

| Cinkarna Celje | 82–86 (OT) | Budućnost Bemax |
Scoring by quarter: 23:23, 9:20, 24:13, 19:19, Overtime: 7:11
| Pts: Friškovec 20; Rebs: Ocvirk 13; Asts: Friškovec 6 | | Pts: Babić 25; Rebs: Mitrašinović 5 Asts: Babić, Živković 6 |

Hall Gimnazija Center Celje, Celje
Attendance: 100
Referees: Stanković, Zrnić, Milin

12 December 2018
18:00

Report

| RMU Banovići | 77–92 | Crvena zvezda |
Scoring by quarter: 17:34, 18:22, 21:14, 21:22
| Pts: Zubac 25; Rebs: Zubac 11; Asts: Dušanić 12 | | Pts: Đorđević 24; Rebs: Naumčev, Topuzović 8 Asts: A. Katanić 6 |

SKC Banovići, Banovići
Attendance: n / a
Referees: Holjevac, Katić, Grubišić

=== Game 10 ===
27 January 2019
18:00

Report

| Beroe | 70–53 | Crvena zvezda |
Scoring by quarter: 23:12, 16:10, 13:18, 18:13
| Pts: Poček 21; Rebs: Lewis 19; Asts: Aleksić 7 | | Pts: Đorđević 17; Rebs: Bojović 10; Asts: three players 2 |

Municipal Hall, Stara Zagora
Attendance: 200
Referees: Holjevac, Hartman, Grubišić

20 December 2018
18:00

Report

| RMU Banovići | 56–72 | Budućnost Bemax |
Scoring by quarter: 18:17, 7:18, 13:22, 18:15
| Pts: Zubac 16; Rebs: Zubac 8 Asts: Ikanović 9 | | Pts: Džebo 22; Rebs: Živković 9 Asts: Živković 5 |

SKC Banovići, Banovići
Attendance: n / a
Referees: Vesković, Virijević, Ćalić

19 December 2018
18:00

Report

| Cinkarna Celje | 69–46 | Triglav Kranj |
Scoring by quarter: 28:8, 6:16, 20:14, 15:8
| Pts: Bessard 23; Rebs: White, Radović 7 Asts: Friškovec, Ocvirk 4 | | Pts: Abramovič 14; Rebs: Kozina Bubnič 8 Asts: Žibert 3 |

Hall Gimnazija Center Celje, Celje
Attendance: 100
Referees: Gajšek, Blaško, Krebs

19 December 2018
17:30

Report

| Trešnjevka 2009 | 67–80 | Montana 2003 |
Scoring by quarter: 13:29, 19:19, 12:20, 23:12
| Pts: Savić 21; Rebs: Savić 9 Asts: Mühl 7 | | Pts: Manuel 16; Rebs: Manuel, Georgieva 5 Asts: Ivanova 5 |

Sutinska vrela, Zagreb
Attendance: 25
Referees: Pelja, Bajgorić, Dojčinović

=== Game 11 ===
16 January 2019
18:30

Report

| Montana 2003 | 70–67 | Cinkarna Celje |
Scoring by quarter: 22:17, 17:14, 5:24, 26:12
| Pts: Ivanova 27; Rebs: Manuel 15; Asts: Dubrovina 4 | | Pts: Bessard 21; Rebs: White 8 Asts: Friškovec 4 |

Mladost, Montana
Attendance: 700
Referees: Arsenijević, Vesković, Pešić

17 January 2019
20:30

Report

| Triglav Kranj | 80–75 | RMU Banovići |
Scoring by quarter: 22:18, 18:22, 13:21, 27:14
| Pts: Abramovič 23; Rebs: Kramzar 7 Asts: Prevodnik 6 | | Pts: Dušanić 24; Rebs: Musić 12; Asts: Šćekić 7 |

Sports Hall Planina, Kranj
Attendance: 70
Referees: Mirilović, Pavičić, Rogić

17 January 2019
19:00

Report

| Budućnost Bemax | 69–74 | Beroe |
Scoring by quarter: 17:22, 19:21, 13:15, 20:16
| Pts: Babić, Barta 19; Rebs: Vučetić 7 Asts: three players 4 | | Pts: Chong 21; Rebs: Poček 12; Asts: Chong, Aleksić 2 |

University Sports&Culture Hall, Podgorica
Attendance: 200
Referees: Kralj, Porobić, Radanović

=== Game 12 ===
27 February 2019
18:00

Report

| Beroe | 66–44 | Triglav Kranj |
Scoring by quarter: 14:5, 15:14, 20:12, 17:13
| Pts: Ivanova 18; Rebs: Lewis 10; Asts: Konstantinova 3 | | Pts: Omerbašić, Ristić 13; Rebs: Omerbašić 9 Asts: Ristić 5 |

Municipal Hall, Stara Zagora
Attendance: 150
Referees: Dojčinović, Ćalić, Vlahović

10 February 2019
18:00

Report

| RMU Banovići | 69–75 | Montana 2003 |
Scoring by quarter: 21:24, 22:10, 15:24, 11:17
| Pts: Šćekić 16; Rebs: Demirović 7 Asts: Šćekić 8 | | Pts: Ivanova 21; Rebs: Ivanova 9 Asts: Stoycheva, Sharenkapova 3 |

SKC Banovići, Banovići
Attendance: 200
Referees: Sedlar, Ćalić, Jovičin

23 January 2019
18:00

Report

| Cinkarna Celje | 93–40 | Trešnjevka 2009 |
Scoring by quarter: 29:7, 25:13, 17:3, 22:17
| Pts: Bessard 27; Rebs: Ocvirk 15; Asts: Friškovec 9 | | Pts: Mühl 13; Rebs: Mühl 7 Asts: Bilić 3 |

Hall Gimnazija Center Celje, Celje
Attendance: 100
Referees: Pelja, Bajgorić, Hasić

=== Game 13 ===
30 January 2019
19:00

Report

| Trešnjevka 2009 | 63–67 | RMU Banovići |
Scoring by quarter: 26:13, 13:20, 18:13, 6:21
| Pts: Mühl 21; Rebs: Pavić 14; Asts: Mühl 6 | | Pts: Šćekić 18; Rebs: Šćekić 7 Asts: Šćekić 4 |

Dom sportova 2, Zagreb
Attendance: 100
Referees: Gajšek, Kuzmin, Krebs

30 January 2019
18:30

Report

| Montana 2003 | 80–72 | Beroe |
Scoring by quarter: 18:17, 20:23, 19:20, 23:12
| Pts: Dimitrova 20; Rebs: Georgieva 11; Asts: Ivanova 6 | | Pts: Poček 24; Rebs: Poček 15; Asts: Aleksić 7 |

Mladost, Montana
Attendance: 700
Referees: Arsenijević, Pešić, Virijević

31 January 2019
19:00

Report

| Budućnost Bemax | 59–58 | Crvena zvezda |
Scoring by quarter: 14:13, 17:17, 11:12, 17:16
| Pts: Džebo 17; Rebs: Džebo 5 Asts: Babić 4 | | Pts: Đorđević 13; Rebs: Bojović 6 Asts: A. Katanić, I. Katanić 3 |

University Sports&Culture Hall, Podgorica
Attendance: 500
Referees: Kralj, Radanović, Komar

=== Game 14 ===
19 February 2019
17:30

Report

| Crvena zvezda | 89–73 | Triglav Kranj |
Scoring by quarter: 22:21, 23:28, 28:12, 16:12
| Pts: Bogićević 26; Rebs: Đorđević 6 Asts: I. Katanič 10 | | Pts: Omerbašić 20; Rebs: four players 4 Asts: three players 4 |

Železnik Hall, Belgrade
Attendance: 100
Referees: Nožinović, Ališehović, Kasumović

7 February 2019
18:00

Report

| Beroe | 77–61 | Trešnjevka 2009 |
Scoring by quarter: 22:16, 21:15, 17:15, 17:15
| Pts: Lewis 23; Rebs: Lewis 12; Asts: Aleksić 8 | | Pts: Mühl 12; Rebs: Mühl, Clark 11; Asts: Mühl 8 |

Municipal Hall, Stara Zagora
Attendance: 200
Referees: Zlatevski, Jakova, Petrović

6 February 2019
18:30

Report

| RMU Banovići | 59–81 | Cinkarna Celje |
Scoring by quarter: 13:20, 17:16, 10:18, 19:27
| Pts: Šćekić 13; Rebs: Demirović 10; Asts: Šćekić 4 | | Pts: Bessard 30; Rebs: White 8 Asts: Delić 5 |

SKC Banovići, Banovići
Attendance: 500
Referees: Vesković, Virijević, Vlahović

=== Game 15 ===
13 February 2019
18:00

Report

| Cinkarna Celje | 90–68 | Beroe |
Scoring by quarter: 30:22, 22:11, 22:15, 16:20
| Pts: Friškovec 27; Rebs: White 7 Asts: Ocvirk 6 | | Pts: Aleksić, Poček 16; Rebs: Lewis 7 Asts: Aleksić 6 |

Hall Gimnazija Center Celje, Celje
Attendance: 500
Referees: Adamović, Babić, Skenderija

14 February 2019
18:30

Report

| Montana 2003 | 64–68 | Crvena zvezda |
Scoring by quarter: 22:16, 15:20, 17:13, 10:19
| Pts: Ivanova 17; Rebs: Manuel 12; Asts: Dubrovina 5 | | Pts: Bogićević 14; Rebs: Đorđević 12; Asts: I. Katanič 6 |

Mladost, Montana
Attendance: 600
Referees: Kruljac, Galiot, Prpić

14 February 2019
20:30

Report

| Triglav Kranj | 63–83 | Budućnost Bemax |
Scoring by quarter: 22:21, 12:26, 21:18, 8:18
| Pts: Ristić 23; Rebs: Kramžar 5 Asts: Ristić 5 | | Pts: Kapor 19; Rebs: Džebo 14; Asts: six players 2 |

Sports Hall Planina, Kranj
Attendance: 70
Referees: Mustapić, Gracin, Galić

=== Game 16 ===
21 February 2019
19:00

Report

| Budućnost Bemax | 91–84 | Montana 2003 |
Scoring by quarter: 22:23, 26:20, 22:19, 21:22
| Pts: Babić 21; Rebs: Barta 8 Asts: Džebo 5 | | Pts: Dimitrova 26; Rebs: Manuel, Georgieva 5 Asts: three players 4 |

University Sports&Culture Hall, Podgorica
Attendance: 700
Referees: Kralj, Porobić, Radanović

20 February 2019
19:30

Report

| Crvena zvezda | 75–60 | Trešnjevka 2009 |
Scoring by quarter: 20:16, 18:16, 20:11, 17:17
| Pts: Bogićević 26; Rebs: Vulović 6 Asts: I. Katanić 6 | | Pts: Savić 19; Rebs: Savić 8 Asts: Strait 4 |

Železnik Hall, Belgrade
Attendance: 150
Referees: Nikšić, Kadrić, Fočo

20 February 2019
18:00

Report

| Beroe | 79–73 | RMU Banovići |
Scoring by quarter: 35:22, 17:15, 15:20, 12:16
| Pts: Poček 22; Rebs: Poček 13; Asts: Aleksić 7 | | Pts: Musić 23; Rebs: Demirović 11; Asts: Dušanić 8 |

Municipal Hall, Stara Zagora
Attendance: 150
Referees: Panov, Jakimovski, Filipovski

=== Game 17 ===
27 February 2019
18:00

Report

| Cinkarna Celje | 93–51 | Crvena zvezda |
Scoring by quarter: 24:14, 22:24, 22:10, 25:3
| Pts: Friškovec 19; Rebs: White 12; Asts: Krošelj 8 | | Pts: I. Katanić, Đorđević 12; Rebs: Bojović 7 Asts: Naumčev 6 |

Hall Gimnazija Center Celje, Celje
Attendance: 300
Referees: Mirilović, Rogić, Jež

13 March 2019
19:00

Report

| Trešnjevka 2009 | 49–113 | Budućnost Bemax |
Scoring by quarter: 15:37, 13:26, 12:18, 9:32
| Pts: Pavić 13; Rebs: Pavić, Savić 5 Asts: Bilić 4 | | Pts: Babić 22; Rebs: Živković 10; Asts: three players 5 |

Dom sportova 2, Zagreb
Attendance: 20
Referees: Bajgorić, Hasić, Bambur

1 March 2019
18:30

Report

| Montana 2003 | 74–57 | Triglav Kranj |
Scoring by quarter: 19:15, 14:17, 28:8, 13:17
| Pts: Dubrovina 13; Rebs: Georgieva 11; Asts: Dubrovina 6 | | Pts: Burgar 14; Rebs: Šarić 9 Asts: Žibert 6 |

Mladost, Montana
Attendance: 300
Referees: Krstevski, Zafirovski, Jakova

=== Game 18 ===
6 March 2019
20:00

Report

| Triglav Kranj | 60–53 | Trešnjevka 2009 |
Scoring by quarter: 10:14, 20:14, 18:10, 12:15
| Pts: Ristić 22; Rebs: Kozina Bubnič 6 Asts: Ristić 6 | | Pts: Mühl 17; Rebs: Mühl 11; Asts: Pavić 4 |

Sports Hall Planina, Kranj
Attendance: 100
Referees: Skenderija, Srdić, Dojčinović

7 March 2019
19:00

Report

| Budućnost Bemax | 86–74 | Cinkarna Celje |
Scoring by quarter: 29:14, 21:13, 20:19, 16:28
| Pts: Barta 26; Rebs: Barta 5 Asts: Babić 7 | | Pts: White 20; Rebs: Radović 5 Asts: Delić 6 |

University Sports&Culture Hall, Podgorica
Attendance: 1000
Referees: Kralj, Porobić, Radanović

7 March 2019
17:30

Report

| Crvena zvezda | 75–52 | RMU Banovići |
Scoring by quarter: 21:13, 18:18, 18:12, 18:9
| Pts: Đorđevć 19; Rebs: Đorđevć 15; Asts: I. Katanić 9 | | Pts: Dušanić 16; Rebs: Ikanović 6 Asts: Musić 5 |

Železnik Hall, Belgrade
Attendance: 100
Referees: Holjevac, Hartman, Baričić
