= 2018–19 WABA League =

Adriatic League

WABA League
- Season: 2018–19
- Duration: October 3, 2018 – March 6, 2019 (Regular season); 23–24 March 2019 (Final Four)
- Teams: 8
- All statistics correct as of July 19, 2022.

The 2018–19 BTravel WABA League was the 18th season of the Adriatic League. Competition included eight teams from six countries. In this season participating clubs from Serbia, Croatia, Montenegro, Bosnia and Herzegovina, Bulgaria and Slovenia.

== Teams ==
=== Team allocation ===
Regular season
| (Bulgaria) Montana 2003 | (Slovenia) Cinkarna Celje | (Croatia) Trešnjevka 2009 | (Montenegro) Budućnost Bemax |
| (Bulgaria) Beroe | (Slovenia) Triglav Kranj | (Serbia) Crvena zvezda | (Bosnia and Herzegovina) RMU Banovići |

=== Venues and locations ===
Location of teams in the 2018–19 WABA League
Location of teams in the 2018–19 WABA League

| Team | Home city | Arena | Capacity |
|---|---|---|---|
| Beroe | Stara Zagora | Municipal Hall | 1,000 |
| Budućnost Bemax | Podgorica | University Sports&Culture Hall | 770 |
| Cinkarna Celje | Celje | Hall Gimnazija Center Celje | 1,500 |
| Crvena zvezda | Belgrade | Železnik Hall | 3,000 |
| Montana 2003 | Montana | Sports Hall Mladost | |
| Trešnjevka 2009 | Zagreb | Dom Sportova | 3,100 |
| Triglav Kranj | Kranj | Sports Hall Planina | 800 |
| RMU Banovići | Banovići | SKC Banovici | |

== Regular season ==
In the Regular season was played with 8 teams and play a dual circuit system, each with each one game at home and away. The four best teams at the end of the regular season were placed in the Final Four. The regular season began on 3 October 2018 and it will end on 6 March 2019.

=== Standings ===
| Pos | Team | Pld | W | L | PF | PA | PD | Pts | Qualification or relegation |
|---|---|---|---|---|---|---|---|---|---|
| 1 | (Bulgaria) Beroe | 14 | 11 | 3 | 1072 | 986 | +86 | 25 | Advance to the Final Four |
| 2 | (Serbia) Crvena zvezda Kombank | 14 | 11 | 3 | 1032 | 939 | +93 | 25 | Advance to the Final Four |
| 3 | (Montenegro) Budućnost Bemax | 14 | 10 | 4 | 1140 | 890 | +250 | 24 | Advance to the Final Four |
| 4 | (Slovenia) Cinkarna Celje | 14 | 9 | 5 | 1136 | 916 | +220 | 23 | Advance to the Final Four |
| 5 | (Bulgaria) Montana 2003 | 14 | 9 | 5 | 1097 | 1046 | +51 | 23 | |
| 6 | (Slovenia) Triglav Kranj | 14 | 4 | 10 | 862 | 1040 | −178 | 18 | |
| 7 | (Bosnia and Herzegovina) RMU Banovići | 14 | 2 | 12 | 950 | 1104 | −154 | 16 | |
| 8 | (Croatia) Trešnjevka 2009 | 14 | 0 | 14 | 765 | 1133 | −368 | 14 | |

Updated to match(es) played on February 14, 2019. Source: WABA League

== Final Four ==
Final Four to be played from 23–24 March 2019 in the Celje, Slovenia.

Semi-finals; 23 March
(Serbia) Crvena zvezda Kombank | 56
(Montenegro) Budućnost Bemax | 85
(Bulgaria) Beroe | 61
(Slovenia) Cinkarna Celje | 58

Final; 24 March
(Montenegro) Budućnost Bemax | 64
(Bulgaria) Beroe | 65
Third place
(Serbia) Crvena zvezda Kombank | 70
(Slovenia) Cinkarna Celje | 83

2018–19 Adriatic League champion

Beroe
1st title

== Awards ==
- Final Four MVP: Snežana Aleksić (173-G-89) of Beroe
- Player of the Year: Ana Poček (190-C-93) of Beroe
- Guard of the Year: Nikolina Babić (177-G-95) of Budućnost Bemax
- Forward of Year: Larisa Ocvirk (187-SF-97) of Cinkarna Celje
- Center of the Year: Ana Poček (190-C-93) of Beroe
- Newcomer of the Year: Nikolina Zubac (188-C-98) of RMU Banovići
- Most Improved Player of Year: Nikolina Babić (177-G-95) of Budućnost Bemax
- Defensive Player of Year: Larisa Ocvirk (187-SF-97) of Cinkarna Celje
- Coach of the Year: Tatyana Gateva of Beroe

1st Team

- PG: Nikolina Babić (177-G-95) of Budućnost Bemax
- SG: Friškovec (179-G-99) of Cinkarna Celje
- F: Larisa Ocvirk (187-SF-97) of Cinkarna Celje
- FC: Ana Poček (190-C-93) of Beroe
- C: Nikolina Džebo (186-F/C-95) of Budućnost Bemax

2nd Team

- PG: Nika Mühl (178-PG-01) of Trešnjevka 2009
- SG: Rebeka Abramovič (172-PG-93) of Triglav Kranj
- F: Hristina Ivanova (183-F-89) of Montana 2003
- FC: Mina Đorđević (186-PF-99) of Crvena zvezda
- C: Breanna Lewis (196-C-94) of Beroe

Honorable Mention

- Chatrice White (190-C-96) of Cinkarna Celje
- Snežana Bogićević (177-SG-97) of Crvena zvezda
- Taylor Manuel (190-C-93) of Montana 2003

All-Defensive Team

- PG: Nikolina Babić (177-G-95) of Budućnost Bemax
- SG: Rebeka Abramovič (172-PG-93) of Triglav Kranj
- F: Larisa Ocvirk (187-SF-97) of Cinkarna Celje
- FC: Mina Đorđević (186-PF-99) of Crvena zvezda
- C: Breanna Lewis (196-C-94) of Beroe

All-Newcomers Team

- G: Ajda Burgar (176-SG-01) of Triglav Kranj
- G: Dragana Zivković (184-G-01) of Budućnost Bemax
- F: Gala Kramžar (163-PG-99) of Triglav Kranj
- C: Nikolina Zubac (188-C-98) of RMU Banovići
- C: Marta Vulović (198-C-00) of Crvena zvezda

== See also ==
- 2018–19 ABA League First Division
- 2018–19 Women's Basketball League of Serbia
