= Klaudia Sosnowska =

Polish basketball player (born 1990)

No. 13 – SKK Polonia Warsaw
- Position: Small forward
- League: Basket Liga Kobiet

Personal information
- Born: April 6, 1990 (age 36) Frankfurt, Germany
- Listed height: 1.84 m (6 ft 0 in)

Career information
- Playing career: 2006–present

Career history
- 2006–2008: Lider Pruszków
- 2006–2008: Arcus SMS PZKosz Łomianki
- 2008–2011: Lotos Gdynia
- 2011–2012: Cegledi EKK (Hungary)
- 2012–2014: King Wilki Morskie Szczecin
- 2014–2015: Widzew Łódź
- 2014–2015: Basket Konin
- 2015–2016: ŁKS SMS Łódź
- 2016–2017: TS Ostrovia Ostrów Wielkopolski
- 2017: Energa Toruń
- 2017–2018: Ślęza Wrocław
- 2018–2019: Panattoni Europe Lider Pruszków
- 2019-present: SKK Polonia Warsaw
Medals
Women's 3x3 basketball
Representing Poland
Europe Cup
Bronze medal – third place	2018 Bucharest
Bronze medal – third place	2022 Graz

Klaudia Anna Sosnowska (born April 6, 1990, in Frankfurt am Main) is a Polish basketball player playing the position of small forward. Since 2019, a player of SKK Polonia Warsaw, previously playing in the Women's Basket League in clubs: King Wilki Morskie Szczecin, Basket Konin, Widzew Łódź, TS Ostrovia Ostrów Wielkopolski, Energa Toruń i Ślęza Wrocław. As of 2019, a player of the Polish women's national team in 3x3 basketball, since 2021 Polish women's national team in 5x5 basketball.

== Achievements ==
As of March 14, 2023, based on, unless otherwise noted.

Team

- Champion:
  - Polish (2009, 2010)
  - LOTTO 3×3 Women's League (2023, 2024)
  - First Polish league (2021 – promotion to EBLK)
  - Polish older juniors (U–20 – 2010)
  - European Women's Basketball League (2024)
- Bronze medal:
  - European Women's Basketball League (2023)
  - Polish championship (2018)
- Polish cup winner (2010, 2011)
- Finalist:
  - Polish Cup (2009)
  - Polish Super Cup (2008, 2009)
- Participant of the Euroleague games (2009/10 – TOP 16, 2010/11)
- Vice-champion of the first league (promotion to PLKK 2013, 2016)
- Winner of the tournament in Trutnov (2017)

Individual

- 1st place in the FIBA-run world ranking of individual players playing 3×3 basketball (September 2021)
- MVP:
  - I-League Group A regular season (2019, 2021)
  - EBLK rounds (18 – 2021/2022)
- Participant in the Poland - FGE Stars match (2010)
- Best forward in the I league (2013 according to eurobasket.com)
- Included in the 1st squad:
  - I league:
    - Group A (2019, 2020, 2021)
    - Group B (2016)[15]
    - 2013, 2016 – via eurobasket.com
  - EBLK rounds (18 – 2021/2022)
  - Polish U-20 championship (2010)

National team

- European 3x3 basketball championship bronze (2022)
- Universiade (2013 – 11. miejsce)
- European Championships:
  - U–20 (2009 – 5th place; 2010 – 9th place)
  - U–18 (2008 – 8th place)
  - U–16 (2006 – 6th place)
