= 2018–19 WABA League Final Four =

The Final Four of the Adriatic League was played on 23–24 March 2019 in the Celje, Slovenia.

== Semifinals ==
23 March 2019
15:00

Report

Crvena zvezda Kombank	56–85	Budućnost Bemax
Scoring by quarter: 12:28, 11:15, 25:23, 8:19
Pts: Đorđević 14; Rebs: I. Katanić 5 Asts: A. Katanić 5		Pts: Kapor 24; Rebs: Barta 11; Asts: Džebo, Vučetić 6

Hall Gimnazija Center Celje, Celje
Attendance: 200
Referees: Terlević, Hadžić, Lenac

23 March 2019
19:00

Report

Beroe	61–58	Cinkarna Celje
Scoring by quarter: 18:18, 17:16, 15:13, 11:11
Pts: Aleksić 24; Rebs: Lewis, Poček 7 Asts: Poček 5		Pts: Friškovec 22; Rebs: Ocvirk 9 Asts: Friškovec 5

Hall Gimnazija Center Celje, Celje
Attendance: 700
Referees: Kralj, Porobić, Babić

== For third place ==
24 March 2019
15:00

Report

Crvena zvezda Kombank	70–83	Cinkarna Celje
Scoring by quarter: 23:24, 20:25, 19:17, 8:17
Pts: Bogićević 25; Rebs: Bogićević 8 Asts: I. Katanić 7		Pts: Friškovec, Ocvirk 19; Rebs: Ocvirk, White 10; Asts: Krošelj, Ocvirk 5

Hall Gimnazija Center Celje, Celje
Attendance: 150
Referees: Terlević, Hadžić, Lenac

== Final ==
24 March 2019
18:00

Report

Budućnost Bemax	64–65	Beroe
Scoring by quarter: 17:17, 11:21, 18:12, 18:15
Pts: Babić 23; Rebs: Džebo 6 Asts: Kapor, Barta 3		Pts: Lewis 14; Rebs: Lewis 7 Asts: Chong 9

Hall Gimnazija Center Celje, Celje
Attendance: 200
Referees: Kralj, Porobić, Babić

== Bracket ==
Semi-finals; 23 March
(Serbia) Crvena zvezda Kombank	56
(Montenegro) Budućnost Bemax	85
(Bulgaria) Beroe	61
(Slovenia) Cinkarna Celje	58

Final; 24 March
(Montenegro) Budućnost Bemax	64
(Bulgaria) Beroe	65
Third place
(Serbia) Crvena zvezda Kombank	70
(Slovenia) Cinkarna Celje	83

2018–19 Adriatic League champion

Beroe
1st title

== Notes ==
- All times given below are in Central European Time.
