= 2015–16 MŽRKL – Classification 7–12 =

Classification 7–12 of the MŽRKL basketball competition took place between 27 January and 10 February 2016.

== Seventh place game ==
Team #1	Agg.	Team #2	1st leg	2nd leg
(Slovenia) Grosuplje	137:155	(Slovenia) Athlete Celje	73:72	64:83

=== Game 1 ===
27 January 2016
20:45

Report

Grosuplje	73–72	Athlete Celje
Scoring by quarter: 14:11, 25:21, 17:19, 17:21
Pts: Gjerkeš 18; Rebs: Đurić 7 Asts: Abramovič, Đurić 7		Pts: Jakovina, Prezelj 14; Rebs: Jakovina 10; Asts: Mišeljić, Ocvirk 3

ŠD Brinje, Grosuplje
Attendance: 50

=== Game 2 ===
10 February 2016
18:00

Report

Athlete Celje	83–64	Grosuplje
Scoring by quarter: 20:17, 21:19, 22:12, 20:16
Pts: Ocvirk 18; Rebs: Friškovec 6 Asts: Potočnik 6		Pts: Rahmanović 17; Rebs: Rahmanović 8 Asts: Rahmanović 4

Dvorana Gimnazije Celje – Center, Celje
Attendance: 100
Referees: Špendl, Gajšek, Vuga

== Ninth place game ==
Team #1	Agg.	Team #2	1st leg	2nd leg
(Bosnia and Herzegovina) Play Off Happy	168:113	(Croatia) Trešnjevka 2009	81:63	87:50

=== Game 1 ===
28 January 2016
18:00

Report

Play Off Happy	81–63	Trešnjevka 2009
Scoring by quarter: 25:10, 18:23, 23:25, 15:5
Pts: Džebo 22; Rebs: Marković, Džebo 13; Asts: Babić 8		Pts: Pačkovski 32; Rebs: Krajačić 9 Asts: Kelava, Krajačić 2

Mirsad Hurić Hall, Goražde
Attendance: 100
Referees: Savović, Vujičić, Orbović

=== Game 2 ===
10 February 2016
18:00

Report

Trešnjevka 2009	50–87	Play Off Happy
Scoring by quarter: 6:22, 21:24, 16:22, 7:19
Pts: Erjavec 15; Rebs: Kelava 9 Asts: Pačkovski 4		Pts: Marković 22; Rebs: Marković, A. Delić 11; Asts: Babić 12

Dom Sportova, Zagreb
Attendance: 50
Referees: Fišer, Župančić, Škrbec

== Notes ==
- Partizan which was supposed to play in the MŽRKL in the group B withdrew from the competition and the last placed team in Group A will automatically take 11 place.
