= Maciej Gordon =

Polish professional basketball coach

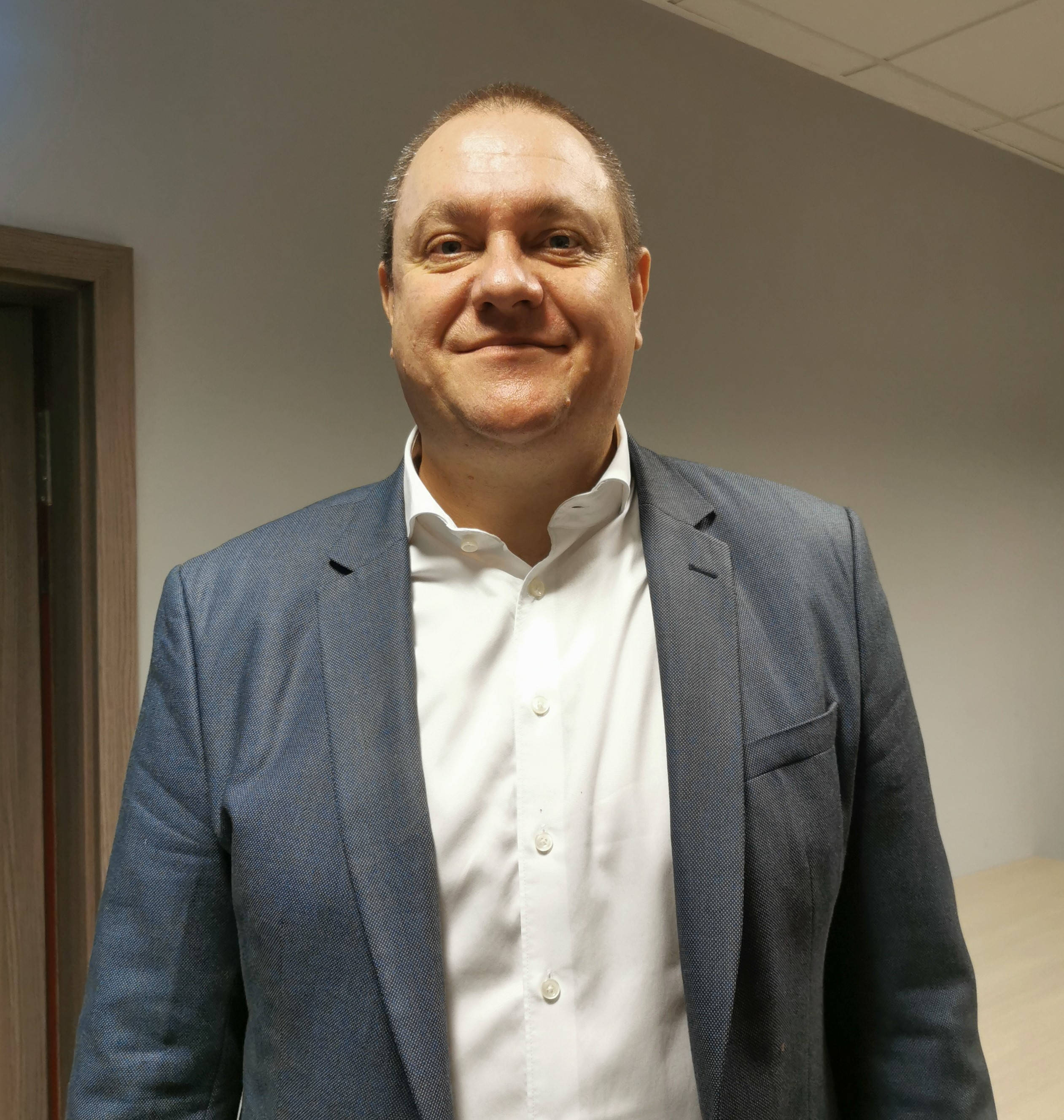

Personal information
- Born: 27 January 1973 (age 53) Bydgoszcz
- Listed height: 6.3 ft 0 in (1.92 m)

Career information
- Playing career: 1992–1998
- Position: Small forward/ shooting guard
- Coaching career: 1995–present

Career history

Playing
- -1992: AZS UMK Toruń (junior)
- 1992–1995: AZS-AWF Warsaw
- 1995–1996: Polonia Warsaw
- 1996–1997: AZS-AWF Warsaw
- 1997–1998: Skra Warsaw

Coaching
- 1995-1997: AZS-AWF Warsaw (male cadet)
- 1997-2010: SKS 12 Warsaw (female cadet)
- 1999-2000: Polonia Warsaw (II coach)
- 2009-2020: AZS UW Warsaw
- 2020–2023: Polonia Warsaw

Maciej Gordon (born January 27, 1973, in Bydgoszcz) is a Polish basketball player, club and national team coach. He mainly played as a shooting guard and a small forward; After the end of his playing career - coach of women's basketball club senior teams (long-time coach AZS UW Warszawa, 2020-2023 in SKK Polonia Warszawa) and youth national teams (currently the Polish U-16 national team). In 2006, at the Academy of Physical Education in Gdańsk, after defending his thesis, he received the first class of coach.

== Coaching achievements ==
- as a club coach (senior teams):
  - twice the title of coach of the year of group A of the I Women's League (2016 i 2021)
  - promotion to Energa Basket Liga Kobiet (2021, with SKK Polonia Warszawa)
  - bronze medal European Women's Basketball League (2023)
  - three times winning the gold medal of the Polish Academic Championships (2014 i 2017 - as head coach, 2021 - as an assistant; all with AZS UW Warszawa)
  - academic vice-championship of Europe (2015)
- as a club coach (youth teams):
  - two bronze medals at the Polish junior women's championships (2004 - as a head coach, 2011 - as an assistant)
  - Polish female cadet championship (2001, with SKS 12 Warszawa)
  - multiple participation in the Polish championships of youth groups
- as a national team coach (youth teams):
  - European championship of female cadet of B division and promotion to A division (2016)
  - 1st place in the FIBA U15 Women's Skills Challenge 2021 group and promotion to the Global Skills Challenge
