= 2024–25 European Women's Basketball League =

European women's basketball tournament

European Women's Basketball League
- Season: 2024–25
- Dates: Regular season: 27 October 2024 – 2 February 2025; Final: 12 March 2025
- Games played: 13
- Teams: Total: 4 (from 4 countries)

Regular season
- Season MVP: (Ukraine) Miriam Uro-Nilie

Finals
- Champions: (Switzerland) Nyon Basket Feminin (1st title)
- Runners-up: (Czech Republic) SBŠ Ostrava
- Third place: (Poland) SKK Polonia Warsawa
- Fourth place: (Ukraine) Frankivsk-Prykarpattya

Records
- Biggest home win: SBŠ Ostrava 101–37 SKK Polonia Warsawa (31 January 2025)
- Biggest away win: Frankivsk-Prykarpattya 44–95 Nyon Basket Feminin (12 January 2025)
- Highest scoring: Frankivsk-Prykarpattya 67–114 SKK Polonia Warsawa (6 December 2024)

The 2024–25 European Women's Basketball League is the 9th season, and sixth since its rebranding, of this competition for the women's teams in Europe.

SKK Polonia Warsawa are the defending champions.

Nyon Basket Feminin won their first title with a win over SBŠ Ostrava in the final.

== Format ==
The four teams all played in a double round robin system. The top two qualifies for the final to decide the champion.

== Teams ==
Location of teams in the 2024–25 European Women's Basketball League

The labels in the parentheses show how each team qualified for the place of its starting round:

- 1st, 2nd, 3rd, etc.: League position of the previous season

Regular season
(Czech Republic) SBŠ Ostrava (7th)
(Poland) SKK Polonia Warsawa (9th)
(Switzerland) Nyon Basket Feminin (2nd)
(Ukraine) Frankivsk-Prykarpattya (1st)

== Group ==
Pos	Team	Pld	W	L	PF	PA	PD	Pts	Qualification	OST	NYO	POL	FRA
1	(Czech Republic) SBŠ Ostrava	6	5	1	491	401	+90	11	Final	—	88–76	101–37	73–56
2	(Switzerland) Nyon Basket Feminin	6	4	2	439	346	+93	10	Final	94–77	—	20–0 (Note: Due to travel and a clash with another tournament, SKK Polonia Warsawa forfeited their match against Nyon Basket Feminin.)	75–55
3	(Poland) SKK Polonia Warsawa	6	3	3	423	387	+36	8		70–75	82–79	—	77–68
4	(Ukraine) Frankivsk-Prykarpattya	6	0	6	328	547	−219	6		69–89	44–95	67–114	—

Source: EWBL
Rules for classification: 1) Points; 2) Points difference; 3) Points scored.

== Final ==
On 21 February 2025, the final was announced to be in Ostrava.

=== Match ===
12 March 2025
17:00

Boxscore

SBŠ Ostrava (Czech Republic)	80–82	(Switzerland) Nyon Basket Feminin
Scoring by quarter: 21–19, 22–15, 16–17, 21–31
Pts: Kovačikova 21; Rebs: Beloševič 11; Asts: Kovačikova 5		Pts: Uro-Nilie 26; Rebs: Takyi 4 Asts: Breen 13

Hala Ostravska Univerzita, Ostrava

2024–25 European Women's Basketball League Champions

Nyon Basket Feminin
First title

== Awards ==
=== European Women's Basketball League MVP ===
Player	Team	Ref.
(Ukraine) Miriam Uro-Nilie	(Switzerland) Nyon Basket Feminin	

=== European Women's Basketball League All Star Team ===
(Slovakia) Nikola Kováčiková ( (Czech Republic) SBŠ Ostrava)	(Czech Republic) Adéla Smutná ( (Czech Republic) SBŠ Ostrava)	(United States) Samantha Breen ( (Switzerland) Nyon Basket Feminin)	(United States) Keira Robinson ( (Switzerland) Nyon Basket Feminin)	(Ukraine) Miriam Uro-Nili ( (Switzerland) Nyon Basket Feminin)
