= Nia Brodie =

American basketball player (born 1995)

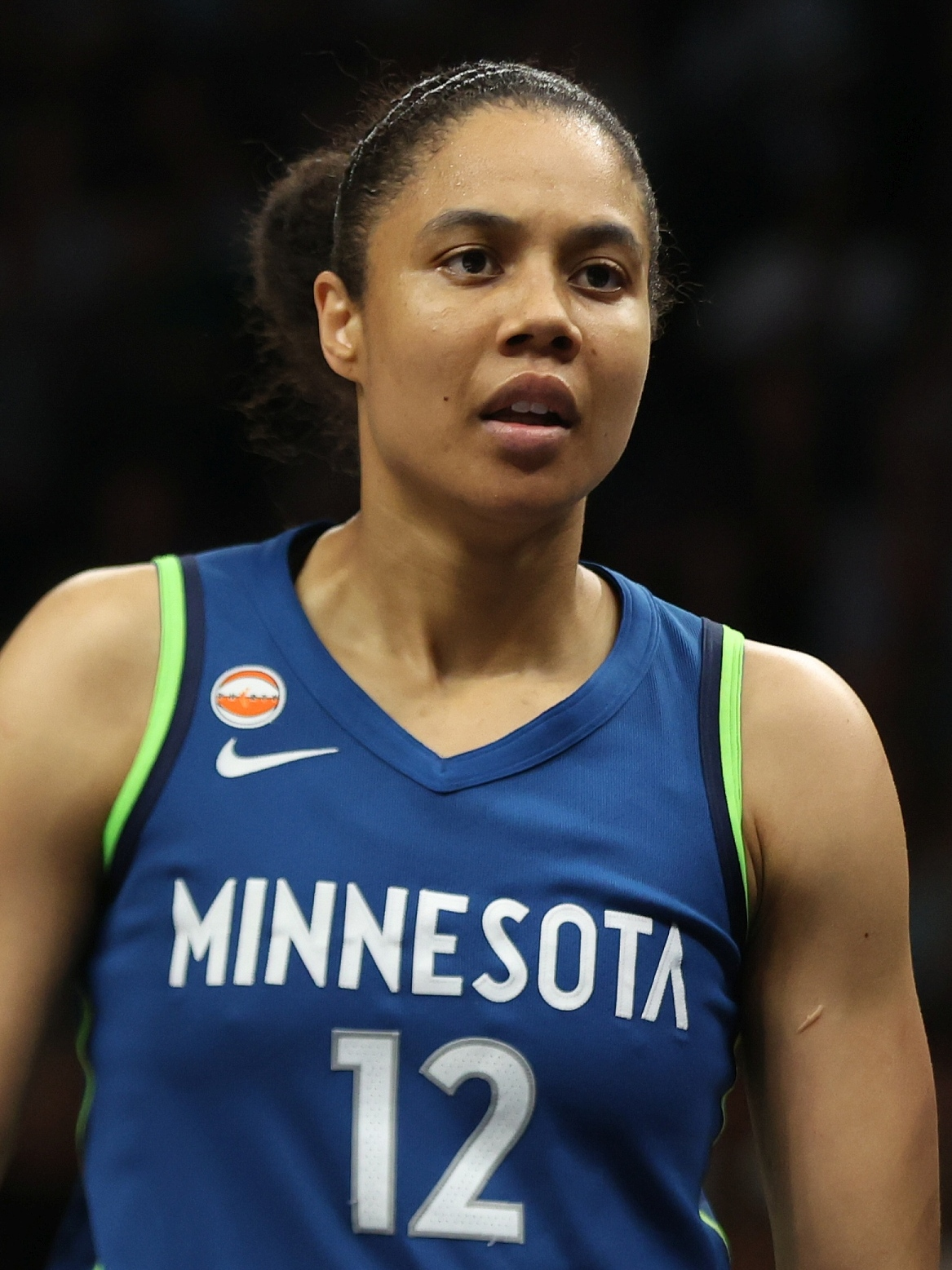
- Brodie with the Minnesota Lynx in 2026

No. 12 – Minnesota Lynx
- Position: Small forward
- League: WNBA

Personal information
- Born: June 11, 1995 (age 31) Saint Paul, Minnesota, U.S.
- Listed height: 6 ft 1 in (1.85 m)
- Listed weight: 177 lb (80 kg)

Career information
- High school: Hopkins (Minnetonka, Minnesota)
- College: Northwestern (2013–2017)
- WNBA draft: 2017: 1st round, 5th overall pick
- Drafted by: San Antonio Stars
- Playing career: 2017–present

Career history
- 2017–2018: San Antonio Stars / Las Vegas Aces
- 2017–2018: Maccabi Ramat Gan
- 2018–2019: Adelaide Lightning
- 2019: Arka Gdynia
- 2019: Atlanta Dream
- 2019: Çukurova Basketbol
- 2020: Phoenix Mercury
- 2021: Maccabi Haifa
- 2021: Los Angeles Sparks
- 2021–2022: Flammes Carolo Basket Ardennes
- 2022–2025: Atlanta Dream
- 2025: Townsville Fire
- 2026–present: Minnesota Lynx

Career highlights
- 4× First-team All-Big Ten (2014–2017); Big Ten All-Freshman Team (2014); McDonald's All-American (2013)
- Stats at WNBA.com
- Stats at Basketball Reference
Medals
Women's basketball
Representing the United States
FIBA Under-19 World Cup
Gold medal – first place	2013 Lithuania	Team

Nia Brodie (born Coffey on June 11, 1995) is an American professional basketball player with the Minnesota Lynx of the Women's National Basketball Association (WNBA). A small forward, she was drafted with the fifth overall pick in the 2017 WNBA draft, which is the highest of any Northwestern basketball player in school history.

Brodie attended Hopkins High School in Minnetonka, Minnesota where she was a McDonald's All-American.

She is the daughter of former NBA player Richard Coffey; and the sister of Amir Coffey, another former NBA player who currently plays in the Israeli Basketball Premier League.

== College career ==
Brodie entered her first year at Northwestern as the starting power forward. On November 5, 2013, she made her collegiate debut recording 14 points, 6 rebounds, 4 assists and 2 blocks in a 98–57 win over Lewis University. At the end of her freshman season she was the first player in Northwestern history to be named first-team all-Big Ten as a freshman.

On January 29, 2015, Brodie registered her career high of 35 points in a 102–99 loss against Iowa.

In her junior season, she broke the Northwestern Wildcats women's basketball record for most rebounds in a season with 344. Which she held until the 2017–18 season. She ended that season as an Honorable Mention for a spot on the WBCA All American Team and on the AP All-American Team.

In her senior season, Brodie broke the NU records for most consecutive games scoring in double figures, total rebounds, free throws made, free throw attempts and field goal attempts in a career. She received another Honorable Mention for the AP All American Team.

Brodie ended her career as the first Player in NU history to make the All Big Ten First Team (Coaches) in all four years of playing. She also made All Big Ten First Team (Media) in her final three seasons. Brodie led NU in scoring and rebounding for all 4 years of her career.

== Professional career ==
=== WNBA ===
==== San Antonio Stars / Las Vegas Aces ====
On April 13, 2017, Brodie was drafted by the San Antonio Stars with the 5th pick of the 2017 WNBA draft. This was the highest any NU basketball player had ever been drafted.

She made her debut on May 13, 2017, in the season-opener against the New York Liberty.

On May 27, 2018, she scored her career high of 23 points in a 98–103 loss against the Seattle Storm.

==== Atlanta Dream (first stint) ====
on April 11, 2019, she was traded to the Atlanta Dream in a three-team trade where the Aces received Sugar Rodgers.

==== Phoenix Mercury ====
On February 19, 2020, Brodie was traded to the Phoenix Mercury as part of a three-team trade.

On February 10, 2021, Brodie was waived.

==== Los Angeles Sparks ====
On March 4, 2021, Brodie was signed to the Los Angeles Sparks.

On June 1, 2021, she recorded a career-high six blocks in a game against the Dallas Wings.

That season, Brodie scored a career-high 8.3 PPG and also played a career high in minutes.

==== Atlanta Dream (second stint) ====
On February 1, 2022, Brodie signed a one-year deal with the Dream.

On February 1, 2023, Brodie re-signed a second one-year deal with the dream.

On February 1, 2024, Brodie re-signed with the dream on a two-year contract.

==== Minnesota Lynx ====
On April 12, 2026, Brodie signed with the Minnesota Lynx for the 2026 season.

=== Overseas ===
Brodie played for Maccabi Ramat Gan of the Israeli Female Basketball Premier League in the 2017–2018 season.

Brodie played for the Adelaide Lightning of the Women's National Basketball League (WNBL) in the 2018–19 WNBL season.

Brodie joined Arka Gdynia of the Basket Liga Kobiet in February 2019.

Brodie played for Çukurova Basketbol of the Women's Basketball Super League from October to November 2019.

In January 2021, Brodie signed with Maccabi Haifa of the Israeli Premier League.

Brodie played for Flammes Carolo Basket Ardennes of the Ligue Féminine de Basketball in the 2021–2022 season.

In January 2025, Brodie signed with the Townsville Fire of the WNBL.

== National career ==
Brodie played for Team USA in the 2013 FIBA Under-19 World Championship for Women. She broke the Team USA record for most free throws without a miss in the U19 tournament with 11.

== Career statistics ==
=== WNBA ===
Legend
GP	Games played	GS	Games started	MPG	Minutes per game	RPG	Rebounds per game
APG	Assists per game	SPG	Steals per game	BPG	Blocks per game	PPG	Points per game
TO	Turnovers per game	FG%	Field-goal percentage	3P%	3-point field-goal percentage	FT%	Free-throw percentage
**Bold**	Career best	°	League leader

==== Regular season ====
WNBA regular season statistics
Year	Team	GP	GS	MPG	FG%	3P%	FT%	RPG	APG	SPG	BPG	TO	PPG
2017	San Antonio	27	1	7.8	.271	.000	.727	1.9	.2	.2	.2	.6	1.8
2018	Las Vegas	28	10	13.8	.380	.400	.618	2.4	.6	.3	.2	1.4	5.3
2019	Atlanta	28	6	13.9	.338	.379	.548	2.8	.4	.5	.5	.8	5.0
2020	Phoenix	15	1	15.3	.421	.333	.167	2.5	.8	.3	.3	**.5**	2.7
2021	Los Angeles	32°	17	**25.2**	.421	**.417**	**.778**	3.8	.9	.8	**1.2**	1.4	**8.3**
2022	Atlanta	16	16	21.0	.347	.290	.742	**5.2**	.8	.6	.1	2.2	6.4
2023	Atlanta	31	**31**	21.9	**.432**	.402	.625	4.8	1.5	.5	**1.2**	1.5	6.9
2024	Atlanta	40°	11	13.3	.324	.273	.762	2.4	1.2	.3	.7	1.0	3.3
2025	Atlanta	**44**	2	10.3	.374	.293	.720	2.6	1.0	.2	.4	.7	3.9
2026	Minnesota	**44**°	28	22.3	**.432**	.382	.583	4.2	**1.8**	**.9**	1.0	.7	6.2
**Career**	10 years, 5 teams	305	123	16.4	.386	.359	.660	3.2	1.0	.5	.6	1.0	5.0

==== Playoffs ====
WNBA playoff statistics
Year	Team	GP	GS	MPG	FG%	3P%	FT%	RPG	APG	SPG	BPG	TO	PPG
2024	Atlanta	2	0	11.0	.333	.250	—	**2.0**	**1.0**	.0	.5	.5	3.5
2025	Atlanta	**3**	0	5.3	.200	.000	—	1.0	.0	.0	.0	**.0**	.7
2026	Minnesota	2	0	**21.5**	**.643**	**.556**	**.750**	1.5	**1.0**	**.5**	**1.0**	1.0	**13.0**
**Career**	3 years, 2 teams	7	0	11.6	.464	.429	.750	1.4	.6	.1	.4	.4	5.0

=== College ===
NCAA statistics
Year	Team	GP	Points	FG%	3P%	FT%	RPG	APG	SPG	BPG	PPG
2013-14	Northwestern	32	490	**.464**	.313	.669	8.1	2.1	**1.7**	1.8	15.3
2014–15	Northwestern	32	505	.440	**.328**	.621	8.7	1.7	**1.7**	1.8	15.8
2015–16	Northwestern	**35**	**711**	.432	.314	.625	9.8	2.1	1.1	**2.1**	**20.3**
2016–17	Northwestern	29	581	.429	.280	**.712**	**10.4**	**2.7**	1.2	1.4	20.0
**Career**		128	2287	.440	.307	.659	9.2	2.1	1.4	1.8	17.9
