= Bohdan Bartosiewicz =

Polish basketball and volleyball player

Personal information
- Born: 21 October 1918 Michałowice
- Died: 2 December 2015 (aged 97) Warsaw, Poland

Career information
- Playing career: 1939–1953
- Coaching career: 1951–1976
Medals
Representing Poland
Men's basketball
EuroBasket
Bronze medal – third place	1939 Lithuania	Team Poland

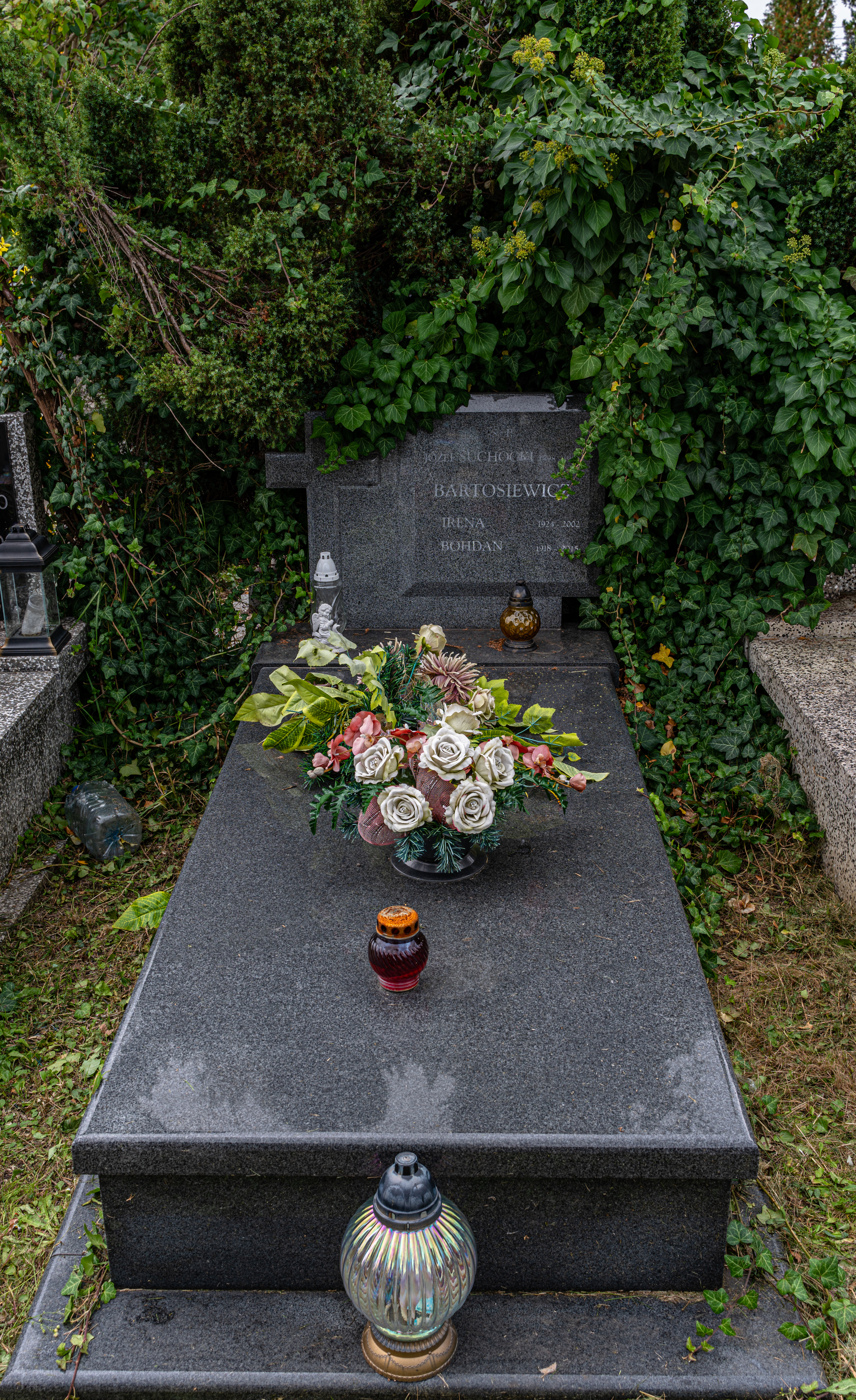

Bohdan Bartosiewicz pseud. "Bartek" (21 October 1918 – 2 December 2015) was a Polish basketball and volleyball player and coach. He was bronze medalist of the European Basketball Championship in 1939.

== Achievements ==
Based on unless otherwise noted.

National team

- bronze medalist of the European Basketball Championship (1939),

Team

- Polish champion and vice-champion in basketball,
- three-time Polish champion and bronze medalist in volleyball.

Individual

- twice participant in the European Basketball Championships,
- representative of Poland in basketball and volleyball,
- special distinction "for the entirety of activities for Warsaw sport" in the plebiscite for the best sportsmen of Warsaw in 2007

Coaching

- vice-championship of Poland and two bronze medals the Polonia Warszawa women's team

== Commemoration ==
Since 2017, Polonia Warsaw organizes women's basketball tournament in memory of Bohdan Bartosiewicz.
