= Ostrovia Ostrów Wielkopolski =

Ostrovia Ostrów Wielkoposki was a Polish multi-sports club which folded in 1996. Since then several sections of the club have remained or were re-formed on historical grounds of the original club.

- TP Ostrovia Ostrów Wielkopolski is a Polish football club.
- TS Ostrovia Ostrów Wielkopolski is a women's basketball team.
- TZ Ostrovia Ostrów Wielkopolski is a motorcycle speedway team, which formed in 2009, on the basis of KM Ostrów Wielkopolski which folded that same year.
- KPR Ostrovia Ostrów Wielkopolski is a men's handball team.

Other former sections included swimming, chess, men's basketball, athletics and gymnastics, all of which had been disbanded.
