= Katarzyna Dulnik =

Polish basketball player

Personal information
- Born: November 28, 1968 (age 57) Warsaw, Poland
- Listed height: 1.78 m (5 ft 10 in)

Career information
- Playing career: 1985–2013
- Position: Shooting guard
- Coaching career: 2012–2017

Career history

Playing
- 1985-1996: Polonia Warsaw
- 1996-1997: Olimpia Poznan
- 1997-1999: Polonia Warsaw
- 1999: Lotos Gdynia
- 1999-2000: Polonia Warsaw
- 2002-2004: Wolomin
- 2004-2006: AZS Jelenia Gora
- 2006-2008: Lider Pruszkow
- 2008-2009: AZS Siedlce
- 2012-2013: Polonia Warsaw

Coaching
- 2012-2016: Polonia Warsaw
- 2016-2017: One Team Ostrów Wielkopolski
Medals
Women's basketball
Representing Poland
European Championships
Gold medal – first place	1999 Poland	Team Poland

Katarzyna Dulnik (born November 28, 1968) is a former Polish female professional basketball player.

== Achievements ==
Based on unless otherwise noted.

Team

- Polish Champion (1999)
- Polish Cup finalist (1991)

Individual

- PLKK regular season MVP (1995)
- Included in the 1st squad of PLKK (2004)
- Leader:
  - PLKK shooters (2004)
  - PLKK in rebounds (2004)

Representation

- European Champion (1999)
- World Cup Bronze +40 (2009)
- Participant:
  - Eurobasket qualifiers (1997)
  - +40 European Championships (2010 – 4th place)

Coaching

- Bronze of the Polish Academic Championships (2015)
