= Edyta Czerwonka =

Polish basketball player

Personal information
- Born: July 23, 1985 (age 41) Częstochowa, Poland
- Listed height: 1.75 m (5 ft 9 in)

Career information
- Playing career: 2000–2014
- Position: Shooting guard

Career history
- 2000-2004: SMS PZKosz Łomianki
- 2004-2005: AZS Uniwersytet Warszawa
- 2005-2006: TS Wisła Can-Pack Kraków
- 2006: AZS KK Jelenia Góra
- 2007: SMS Łomianki
- 2007-2008: RMKS Rybnik
- 2008-2009: TS Wisła Can-Pack Kraków
- 2009-2013: AZS Rzeszow
- 2013-2014: SKK Polonia Warsaw

Edyta Czerwonka (born July 23, 1985) is a Polish female professional basketball player.
