= 2017 WNBA draft =

General information
- Sport: Basketball
- Date: April 13, 2017
- Location: Samsung 837, New York City
- Networks: ESPN2 (first round); ESPNU (Second and Third Rounds)

Overview
- League: WNBA
- First selection: Kelsey Plum; San Antonio Stars

The 2017 WNBA draft was the league's draft for the 2017 WNBA season. On March 30, the WNBA announced that the draft would take place on April 13 in New York at Samsung 837.

== Draft lottery ==
The lottery selection to determine the order of the top four picks in the 2017 draft occurred on September 28, 2016. The winner of the lottery was the San Antonio Stars.

=== Lottery chances ===
All odds out of 1,000 based on percentages (the 11–12–13–14 combination was ignored).

Note: Team selected for the No. 1 pick noted in bold text.

Team	Combined 2015–16 record	Lottery chances	Result
**San Antonio Stars**	**15–53**	**44.2%**	**1st pick**
Dallas Wings	29–39	22.7%	3rd pick
Los Angeles Sparks (via Connecticut)	29–39 (Note: Connecticut's record)	22.7%	4th pick
Washington Mystics	31–37	10.4%	2nd pick

This is the fourth time that the lottery was won by the team that had the highest odds. The lottery odds were based on combined records from the 2015 and 2016 WNBA seasons. The San Antonio Stars, with the worst two-year record, were guaranteed no worse than the third pick.

== Notable prospects ==
On November 29, 2016, the WNBA announced the following notable prospects for the 2017 draft.

- Alaina Coates – South Carolina
- Kelsey Plum – Washington
- Shatori Walker-Kimbrough – Maryland
- Alexis Jones – Baylor
- Nina Davis – Baylor
- Nia Coffey – Northwestern
- Brionna Jones – Maryland

== Draft invitees ==
On April 6, 2017, the WNBA released the names of the players invited to be in attendance at the draft.

- (United States) Brionna Jones, Maryland
- (United States) Alexis Jones, Baylor
- (United States) Allisha Gray, South Carolina
- (United States) Kaela Davis, South Carolina
- (United States) Nia Coffey, Northwestern
- (United States) Alaina Coates, South Carolina
- (United States) Erica McCall, Stanford
- (United States) Kelsey Plum, Washington
- (United States) Shatori Walker-Kimbrough, Maryland
- (United States) Sydney Wiese, Oregon State

== Key ==
!	Denotes player who has been inducted to the Naismith Memorial Basketball Hall of Fame
^	Denotes player who has been inducted to the Women's Basketball Hall of Fame
*	Denotes player who has been selected for at least one All-Star Game and All-WNBA Team
^{+}	Denotes player who has been selected for at least one All-Star Game
^{#}	Denotes player who never played in the WNBA regular season or playoffs
**Bold**	Denotes player who won Rookie of the Year

== Draft ==
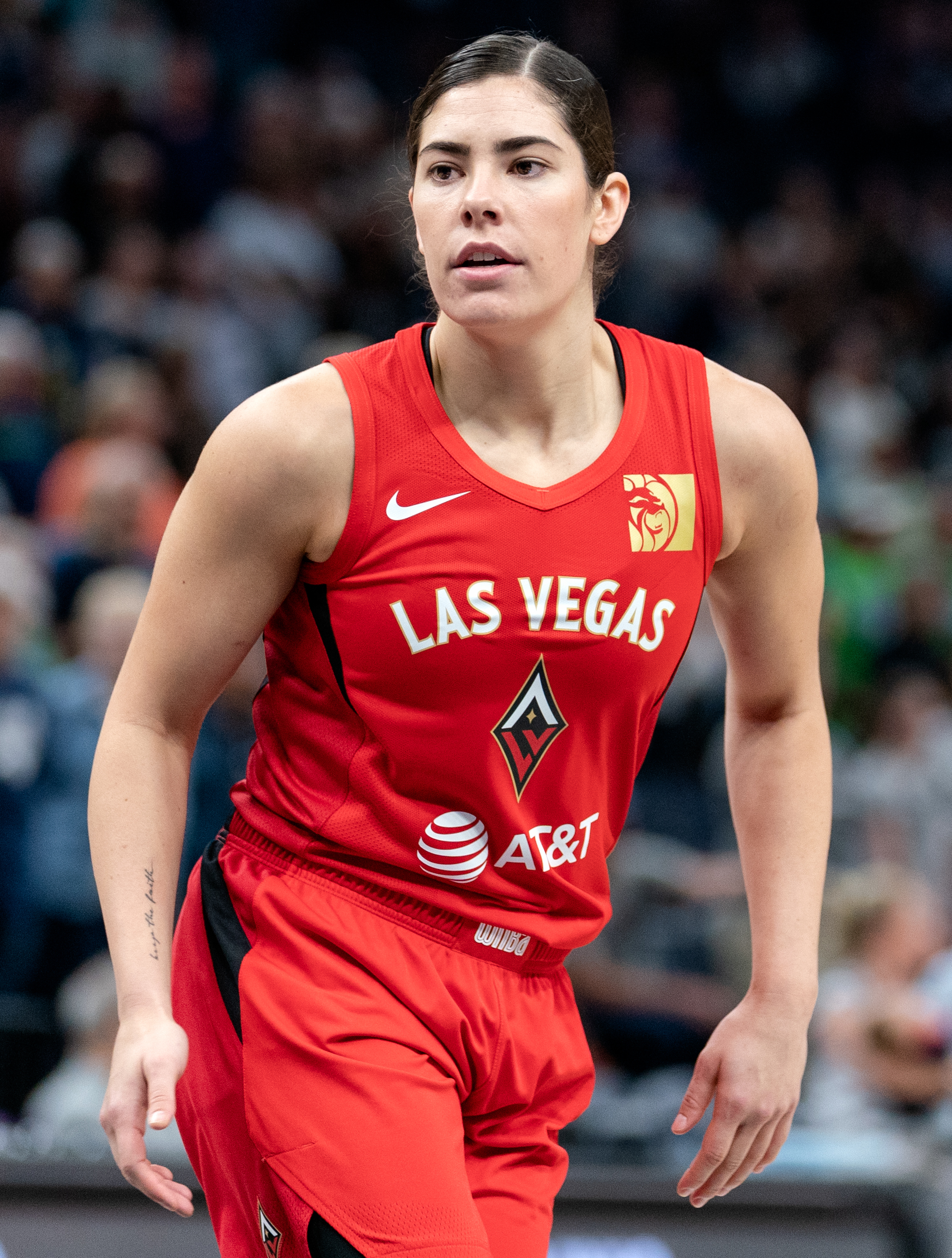
Kelsey Plum was selected 1st overall by the San Antonio Stars.

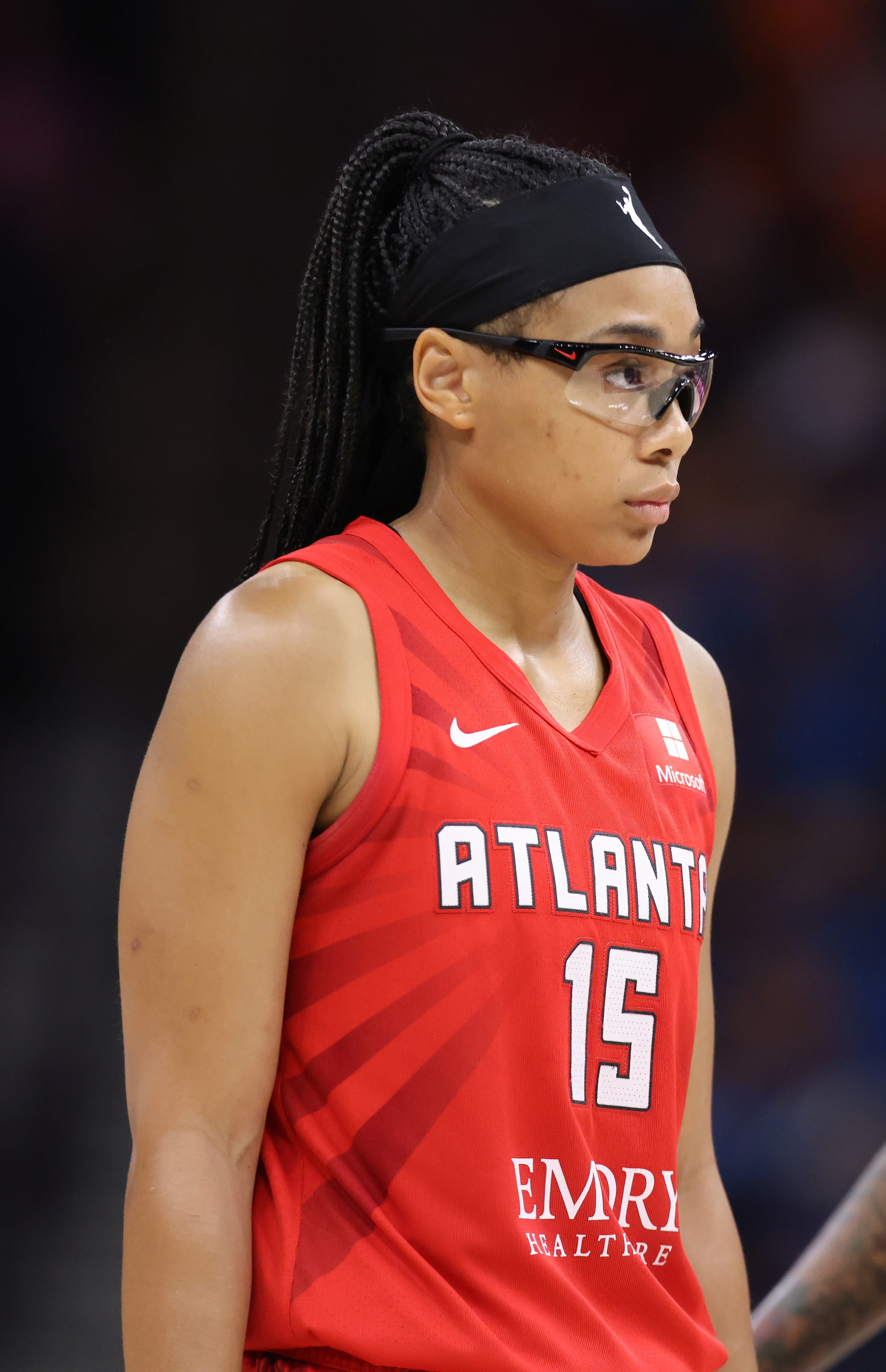
Allisha Gray was selected 4th overall by the Dallas Wings.

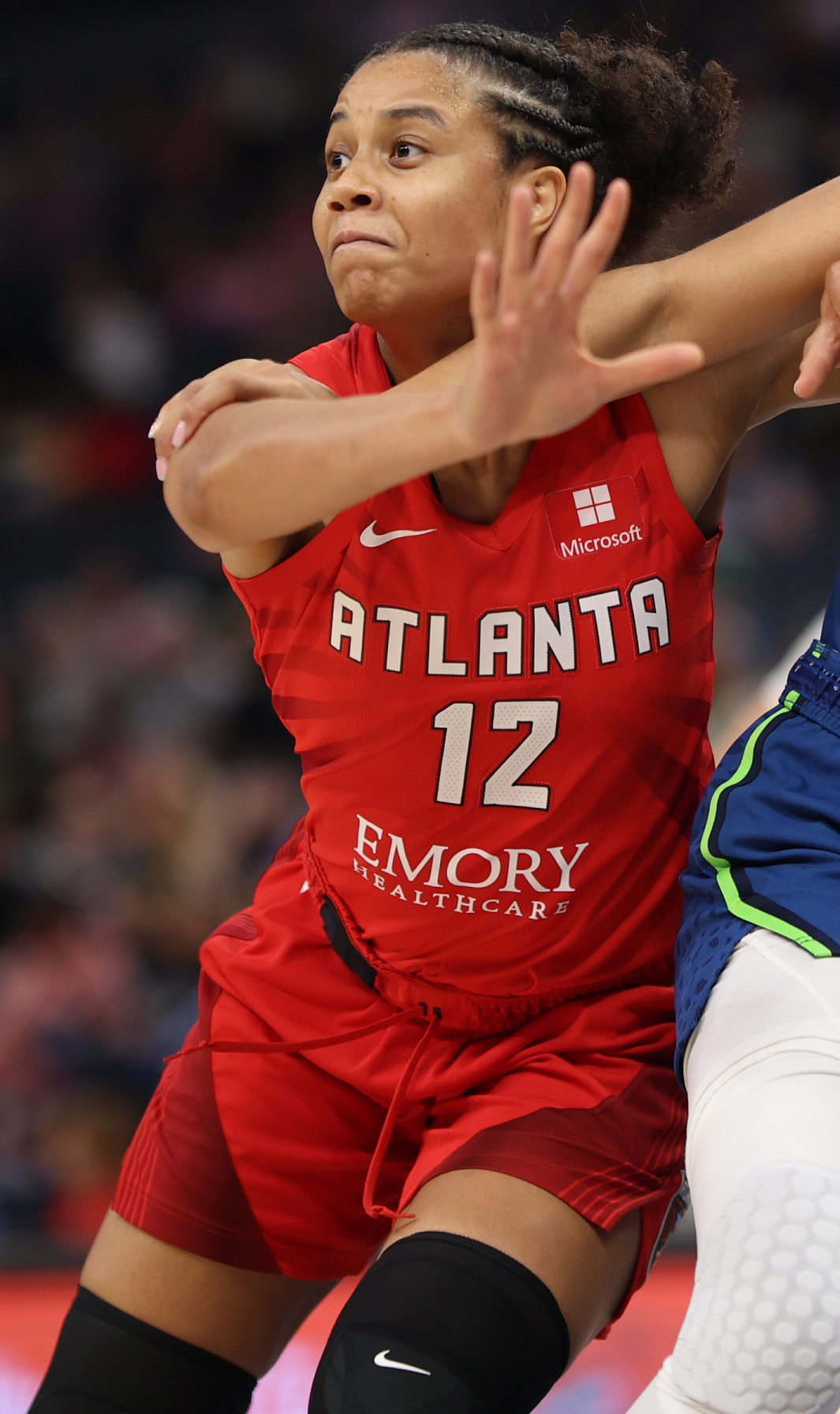
Nia Coffey was selected 5th overall by the San Antonio Stars.

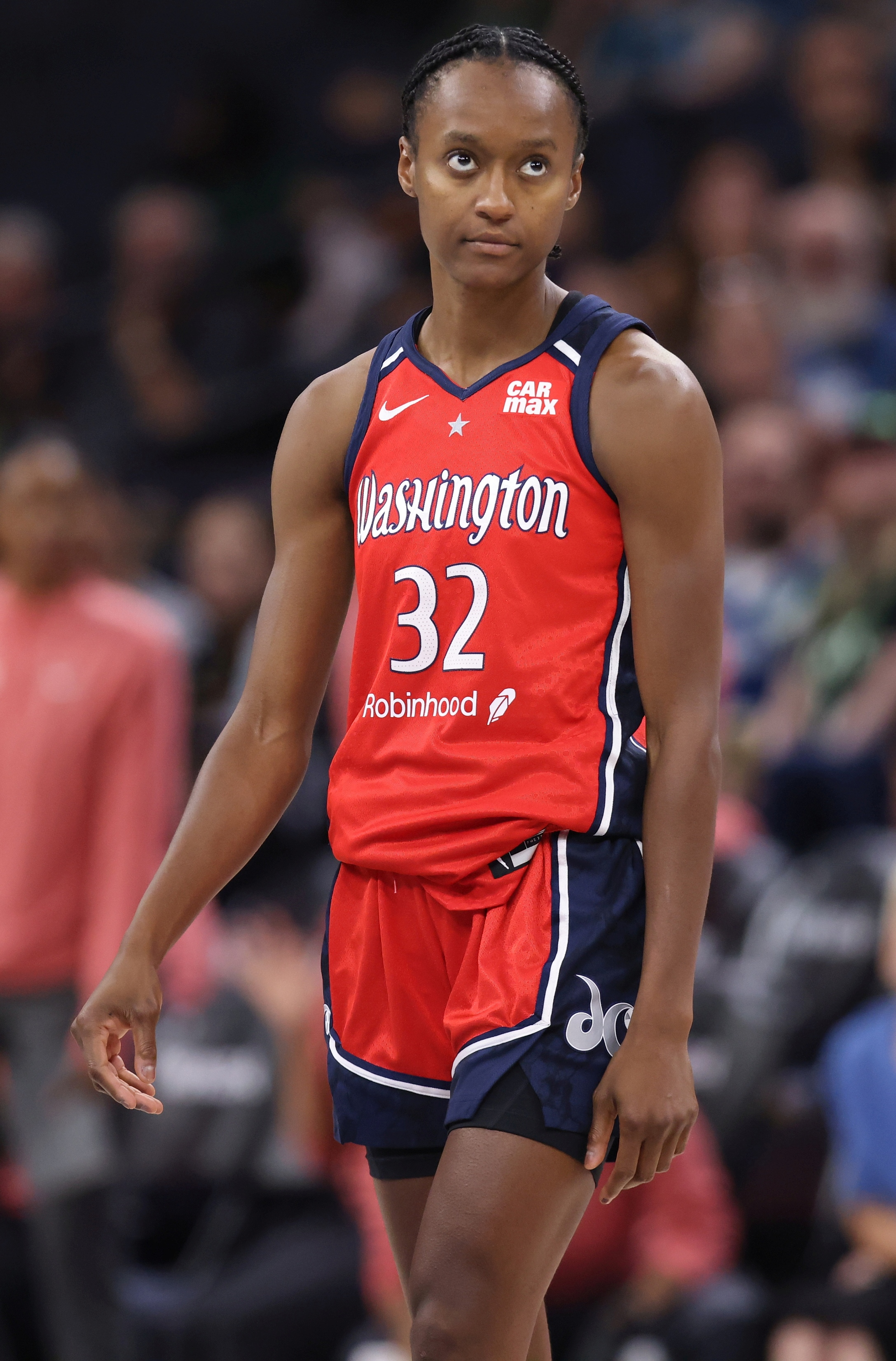
Shatori Walker-Kimbrough was selected 6th overall by the Washington Mystics.

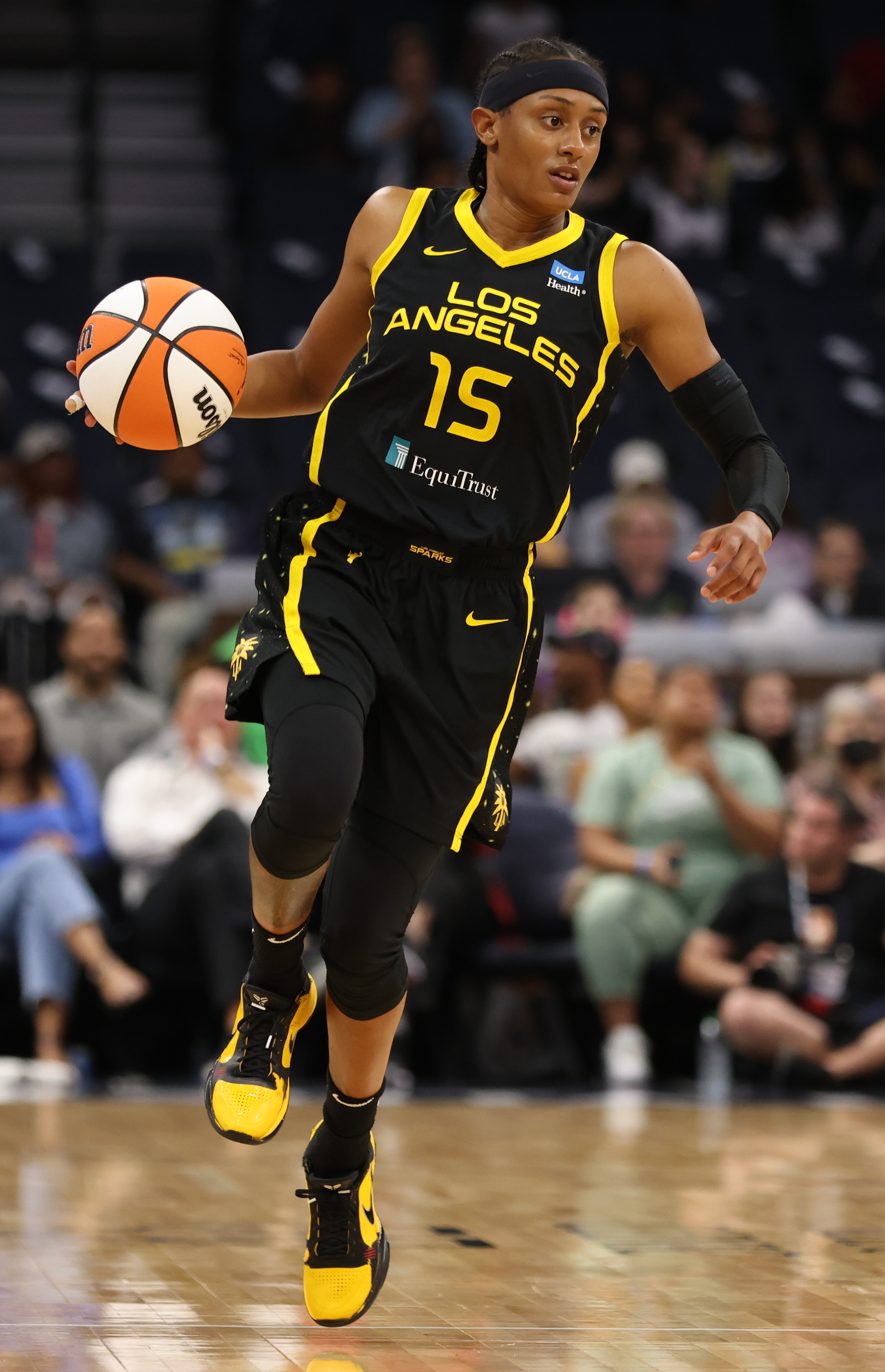
Brittney Sykes was selected 7th overall by the Atlanta Dream.

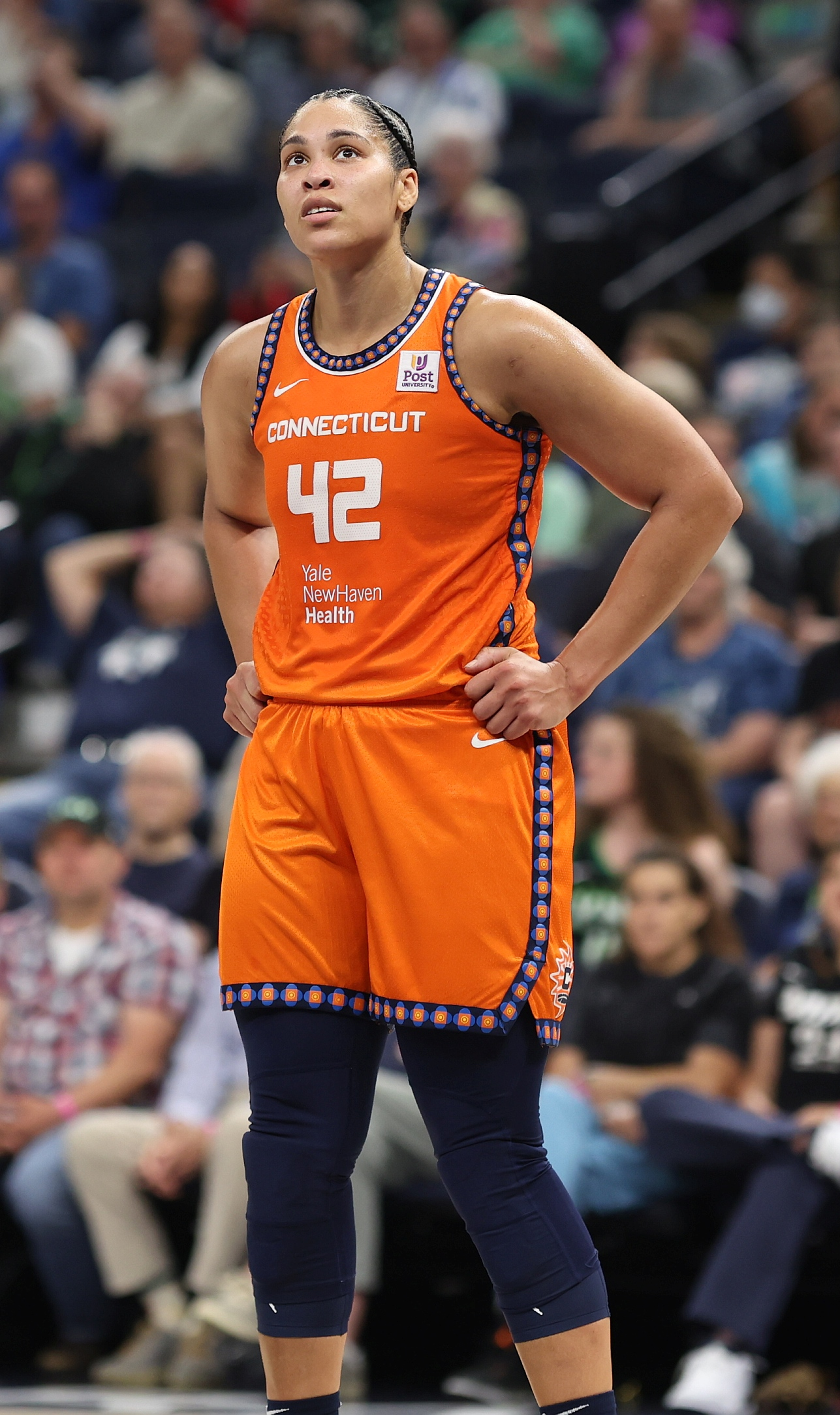
Brionna Jones was selected 8th overall by the Connecticut Sun.

=== Round 1 ===
Pick	Player	Nationality	Team	School / club team
1	Kelsey Plum *	United States	San Antonio Stars	Washington
2	Alaina Coates	United States	Chicago Sky (from Washington) (Note: February 2, 2017: Washington to Chicago: Washington acquired Elena Delle Donne; Chicago acquired 2017 No. 2 pick, Stefanie Dolson, and Kahleah Copper)	South Carolina
3	Evelyn Akhator	Nigeria	Dallas Wings	Kentucky
4	**Allisha Gray** *	United States	Dallas Wings (from Connecticut via Los Angeles) (Note: April 14, 2016: Connecticut to Los Angeles: Connecticut acquired Jonquel Jones and the 17th pick in the 2016 WNBA Draft; Los Angeles acquired Chelsea Gray, the 15th and 23rd picks in the 2016 WNBA Draft and the Suns' first round pick in the 2017 draft) (Note: February 17, 2017: Los Angeles to Dallas: Dallas acquired 2017 No. 4 and No. 23 pick; Los Angeles acquired rights to Odyssey Sims and the 2017 No. 11 pick)	South Carolina
5	Nia Coffey	United States	San Antonio Stars (from Phoenix) (Note: January 31, 2016: Phoenix to San Antonio: Phoenix acquired Danielle Robinson; San Antonio acquired 2017 No. 5 pick and Isabelle Harrison)	Northwestern
6	Shatori Walker-Kimbrough	United States	Washington Mystics (from Seattle) (Note: January 30, 2016: Three-team trade involving New York, Seattle, Washington: New York acquired Kia Vaughn and Bria Hartley (from Washington); Seattle acquired Carolyn Swords (from New York) and 2017 No. 15 pick (from Washington); Washington acquired 2017 No. 6 and No. 18 pick (from Seattle))	Maryland
7	Brittney Sykes ^{+}	United States	Atlanta Dream	Syracuse
8	Brionna Jones ^{+}	United States	Connecticut Sun (from Indiana) (Note: February 21, 2017: Three-team trade involving Connecticut, Indiana, and Phoenix: Connecticut acquired Lynetta Kizer and 2017 No. 8 pick (from Indiana); Indiana acquired Candice Dupree and 2017 No. 17 pick (from Phoenix); Phoenix acquired Camille Little and Jillian Alleyne (from Connecticut))	Maryland
9	Tori Jankoska ^{#}	United States	Chicago Sky	Michigan State
10	Kaela Davis	United States	Dallas Wings (from New York) (Note: May 11, 2016: New York to Dallas: New York acquired Amanda Zahui B and 2017 second round pick; Dallas acquired 2017 No. 10 pick)	South Carolina
11	Sydney Wiese	United States	Los Angeles Sparks (from Los Angeles via Dallas) (Note: March 1, 2016: Dallas to Los Angeles: Dallas acquired Erin Phillips, 2016 No. 5 pick, and 2017 first round pick; Los Angeles acquired Riquna Williams and 2016 No. 6 pick)	Oregon State
12	Alexis Jones	United States	Minnesota Lynx	Baylor

=== Round 2 ===
Pick	Player	Nationality	Team	School / club team
13	Shayla Cooper ^{#}	United States	Connecticut Sun (from San Antonio via Phoenix) (Note: May 6, 2016: San Antonio to Phoenix: San Antonio acquired Monique Currie; Phoenix acquired the 2017 No. 13 pick) (Note: June 25, 2016: Phoenix to Connecticut: Phoenix acquired Kelsey Bone; Connecticut acquired Courtney Williams, rights to Jillian Alleyne, and the 2017 No. 13 pick)	Ohio State
14	Lindsay Allen	United States	New York Liberty (from Dallas)	Notre Dame
15	Alexis Peterson	United States	Seattle Storm (from Washington)	Syracuse
16	Leticia Romero	Spain	Connecticut Sun	Florida State
17	Erica McCall	United States	Indiana Fever (from Phoenix)	Stanford
18	Jennie Simms	United States	Washington Mystics (from Seattle)	Old Dominion
19	Jordan Reynolds ^{#}	United States	Atlanta Dream	Tennessee
20	Feyonda Fitzgerald	United States	Indiana Fever	Temple
21	Chantel Osahor ^{#} (traded to Minnesota) (Note: April 14, 2017: Chicago to Minnesota: Chicago acquired Keisha Hampton; Minnesota acquired the rights to Chantel Osahor)	United States	Chicago Sky	Washington
22	Ronni Williams ^{#}	United States	Indiana Fever (from New York via Atlanta) (Note: May 2, 2016: New York to Atlanta: New York acquired Shoni Schimmel; Atlanta acquired 2017 second round pick) (Note: May 10, 2016: Atlanta to Indiana: Atlanta acquired Layshia Clarendon; Indiana acquired 2017 second round pick)	Florida
23	Breanna Lewis	United States	Dallas Wings (from Los Angeles)	Kansas State
24	Lisa Berkani ^{#}	France	Minnesota Lynx	USO Mondeville (France)

=== Round 3 ===
Pick	Player	Nationality	Team	School / club team
25	Schaquilla Nunn ^{#}	United States	San Antonio Stars	Tennessee
26	Saniya Chong	United States	Dallas Wings	Connecticut
27	Mehryn Kraker ^{#}	United States	Washington Mystics	Green Bay
28	Jessica January ^{#}	United States	Connecticut Sun	DePaul
29	Alexis Prince	United States	Phoenix Mercury	Baylor
30	Lanay Montgomery	United States	Seattle Storm	West Virginia
31	Oderah Chidom ^{#}	United States	Atlanta Dream	Duke
32	Adrienne Motley ^{#}	United States	Indiana Fever	Miami
33	Makayla Epps	United States	Chicago Sky	Kentucky
34	Kai James ^{#}	United States	New York Liberty	Florida State
35	Saicha Grant-Allen ^{#}	Canada	Los Angeles Sparks	Dayton
36	Tahlia Tupaea ^{#}	Australia	Minnesota Lynx	Sydney Uni Flames (Australia)

== See also ==
- List of first overall WNBA draft picks
