= Breanna Lewis =

American basketball player (born 1994)

Personal information
- Born: June 22, 1994 (age 32) Milwaukee, Wisconsin, U.S.
- Listed height: 6 ft 5 in (1.96 m)
- Listed weight: 205 lb (93 kg)

Career information
- High school: Riverside (Milwaukee)
- College: Kansas State
- WNBA draft: 2017: 2nd round, 23rd overall pick
- Drafted by: Dallas Wings
- Playing career: 2017–2018
- Position: Center; forward
- Number: 22

Career history
- 2017–2018: Dallas Wings
- 2017: TS Ostrovia Ostrów Wielkopolski
- 2019: WBC Beroe

Career highlights
- First-team All-Big 12 (2016, 2017)
- Stats at WNBA.com
- Stats at Basketball Reference

Breanna Lewis (born June 22, 1994) is an American former professional basketball player. She played college basketball for the Kansas State Wildcats and was selected by the Dallas Wings of the Women's National Basketball Association (WNBA) in the second round of the 2017 WNBA draft.

== Early life ==
Lewis was born on June 22, 1994 in Milwaukee, Wisconsin. She attended Riverside University High School in Milwaukee. In 2013, she led the school's basketball team to a state championship and earned a WBCA All-State First Team selection after averaging 15.5 points and 12.8 rebounds per game. She was also named to the Associated Press third-team all-state and committed to play college basketball for the Kansas State Wildcats.

== College career ==
In her freshman season at Kansas State, Lewis averaged 5.7 points, 4.6 rebounds, and 1.5 blocks per game in 29 games, recording her first career double-double against the Kansas Jayhawks in the Big 12 tournament.

In her sophomore season, she led Kansas State in points, rebounds, and blocks, with 11.5 points per game, 6.4 rebounds per game, and 2.9 blocks per game, as well as 1.5 steals per game in 33 games. She added four more double-doubles. After the season, Lewis participated in an Athletes in Action international tournament.

In her junior season, Lewis averaged 16.7 points, 7.5 rebounds, 2.6 blocks, and 1.5 steals per game in 32 games. She recorded seven double-doubles and scored double-digit points in 30 games. Lewis was named First-team All-Big 12 and led Kansas State to the 2016 NCAA Division I women's basketball tournament, the Wildcats' first national championship tournament qualification in four years. She scored 13 points in a victory over the George Washington Colonials in the first round of the tournament.

In Lewis's senior season, she averaged 13.9 points, 8.2 rebounds, 1.7 blocks, and 1.0 steals per game in 34 games. She added nine more double-doubles and helped take Kansas State to the 2017 NCAA Division I women's basketball tournament. In a first-round win against the Drake Bulldogs, Lewis scored 23 points and secured 11 rebounds. She was named first-team All-Big 12 for the second time.

Lewis ended her college career as Kansas State's all-time leader in blocks, with 282. The only player in Kansas State program history to be named to the Big 12 All-Defensive team, Lewis earned the honor in 2015, 2016, and 2017. She majored in general human ecology at Kansas State University.

== Professional career ==
Lewis was selected in the second round (23rd overall) of the 2017 WNBA draft by the Dallas Wings.

In 2017, her rookie season, Lewis played in 13 games, averaging 0.5 points and 0.7 rebounds per game. She averaged 1.2 points and 1.2 rebounds per game in 2018 and was waived after 6 games.

In 2017 during the WNBA offseason, Lewis played for TS Ostrovia in Poland. In 2019, she played for Beroe in Bulgaria, leading the team to a WABA championship.

== Career statistics ==
Legend
GP	Games played	GS	Games started	MPG	Minutes per game	RPG	Rebounds per game
APG	Assists per game	SPG	Steals per game	BPG	Blocks per game	PPG	Points per game
TO	Turnovers per game	FG%	Field-goal percentage	3P%	3-point field-goal percentage	FT%	Free-throw percentage
**Bold**	Career best	°	League leader

=== WNBA ===
WNBA regular season statistics
Year	Team	GP	GS	MPG	FG%	3P%	FT%	RPG	APG	SPG	BPG	TO	PPG
2017	Dallas	**13**	0	4.0	.167	—	.750	0.7	**0.2**	0.0	0.0	**0.5**	0.5
2018	Dallas	6	0	**4.3**	**.300**	—	**1.000**	**1.2**	0.0	0.0	**0.2**	**0.5**	**1.2**
**Career**	2 years, 1 team	19	0	4.1	.227	—	.800	0.8	0.1	0.0	0.1	0.5	0.7

== Personal life ==
Lewis has three sisters.
