= European Women's Basketball League =

- Sport: Basketball
- Founded: 2015
- First season: 2015–16
- No. of teams: 16
- Most titles: (Slovakia) Good Angels Košice, (Latvia) TTT Riga (2 titles each)
- Level on pyramid: 1
- Website: ewbl.eu

The European Women's Basketball League, shortly EWBL, formerly known as Eastern European Women's Basketball League or EEWBL, is a top-level basketball league featuring female clubs from EWBL members (including Belarus, Czech Republic, Estonia, Hungary, Kazakhstan, Latvia, Lebanon, Lithuania, Netherlands, Poland, Russia, Slovakia, Sweden, Switzerland, Ukraine, Turkey).

== History ==
The competition was founded in 2015 under the name Eastern European Women's Basketball League (EEWBL), as a women's regional tournament for Eastern European countries. As the competition expanded to countries outside Eastern Europe, it was re-named European Women's Basketball League (EWBL) ahead of the 2018–19 season.

Expansion

Since the inaugural season, the league had the following changes to the number of clubs and countries participating.

- 2015–16: 8 clubs from 6 countries
- 2016–17: 12 clubs from 9 countries
- 2017–18: 16 clubs from 10 countries

== Format ==
The league has a regular season followed by a final four. The regular season is divided in three stages, played at a different location. The best clubs of the regular season qualify for the final four stage.

== Summary ==
Year	Final		
Year	Winner	Score	Runner-up
2015–16	(Latvia); TTT Riga	81–67	(Poland); Lotos Gdynia
2016–17	(Slovakia); Good Angels Košice	67–44	(Latvia); TTT Riga
2017–18	(Slovakia); Good Angels Košice	74–71	(Latvia); TTT Riga
2018–19	(Latvia); TTT Riga	73–63	(Belarus); BC Minsk
2019–20	Playoffs cancelled due to the COVID-19 pandemic.		
2020–21	(Belarus); Horizont Minsk	70–60	(Russia); Nika Syktyvkar
2021–22	(Czech Republic); Žabiny Brno	57–51	(Slovakia); Piešťanské Čajky
2022–23	(Czech Republic); Levhartice Chomutov	77–73	(Lithuania); BC Neptunas Klaipeda
2023–24	(Poland); Polonia Warszawa	66–56	(Ukraine); Frankivsk Prykarpattya
2024–25	(Switzerland); Nyon Basket Feminin	82–80	(Czech Republic); SBŠ Ostrava

== List of champions ==
Club	Champions	Runners-up	Years won	Years runner-up
(Latvia) TTT Riga	2	2	2016, 2019	2017, 2018
(Slovakia) Good Angels Košice	2	–	2017, 2018	–
(Belarus) Horizont Minsk	1	–	2021	–
(Czech Republic) Žabiny Brno	1	–	2022	–
(Czech Republic) Levhartice Chomutov	1	–	2023	–
(Poland) Lotos Gdynia	–	1	–	2016
(Belarus) BC Tsmoki-Minsk	–	1	–	2019
(Russia) Nika Syktyvkar	–	1	–	2021
(Slovakia) Piešťanské Čajky	–	1	–	2022
(Lithuania) BC Neptunas Klaipeda	–	1	–	2023
(Poland) Polonia Warsaw	1	0	2024	–
(Ukraine) Frankivsk Prykarpattya	–	1	–	2024
(Switzerland) Nyon Basket Feminin	1	0	2025	–
(Czech Republic) SBŠ Ostrava	–	1	–	2025

== See also ==
- North European Basketball League
- European North Basketball League
