= Nikola Kováčiková =

Slovak basketball player

SBŠ Ostrava [cs]
- Position: Guard
- League: ŽBL

Personal information
- Born: 6 January 1999 (age 27) Levice, Slovakia
- Listed height: 5 ft 11 in (1.80 m)

Nikola Kováčiková (born January 6, 1999) is a Slovak basketball player for SBŠ Ostrava and the Slovakia national team.

She participated at the EuroBasket Women 2017. After moving to the United States in 2018, she played for Georgetown Hoyas for two years, before moving in 2020 to the Penn Quakers. She transferred in 2022 to play for Cal Poly Mustangs. Ahead of the 2024–25 season, she moved from the Spanish second league to the Czech league, to play for SBŠ Ostrava.
