= Tina Jakovina =

Slovenian basketball player

No. 19 – Crvena zvezda
- Position: Small forward
- League: Basketball League of Serbia

Personal information
- Born: August 11, 1992 (age 34) Postojna, Slovenia
- Listed height: 6 ft 0 in (1.83 m)

Tina Jakovina (born August 11, 1992) is a Slovenian basketball player for Crvena zvezda and the Slovenian national team.

She participated at the EuroBasket Women 2017.
