= Katarzynki Toruń =

- League: Basket Liga Kobiet
- Founded: 2005
- Arena: Hala Sportowo-Widowiskowa Toruń (capacity: 6,192)
- Location: Toruń, Poland
- Team colors: Black and Orange
- President: (Poland) Maciej Krystek
- Head coach: (Bosnia and Herzegovina) Elmedin Omanić

Katarzynki Toruń, known as Energa Katarzynki Toruń for sponsorship reasons, is a Polish professional women's basketball club, founded in 2005 in Toruń. They play in the Basket Liga Kobiet, the highest competition in Poland. In the 2017–18 season, the team also played in the EuroCup Women.

== Honours ==
- Polish Championship:
  - Third place (3): 2010, 2012, 2015
