= Saniya Chong =

American basketball player (born 1994)

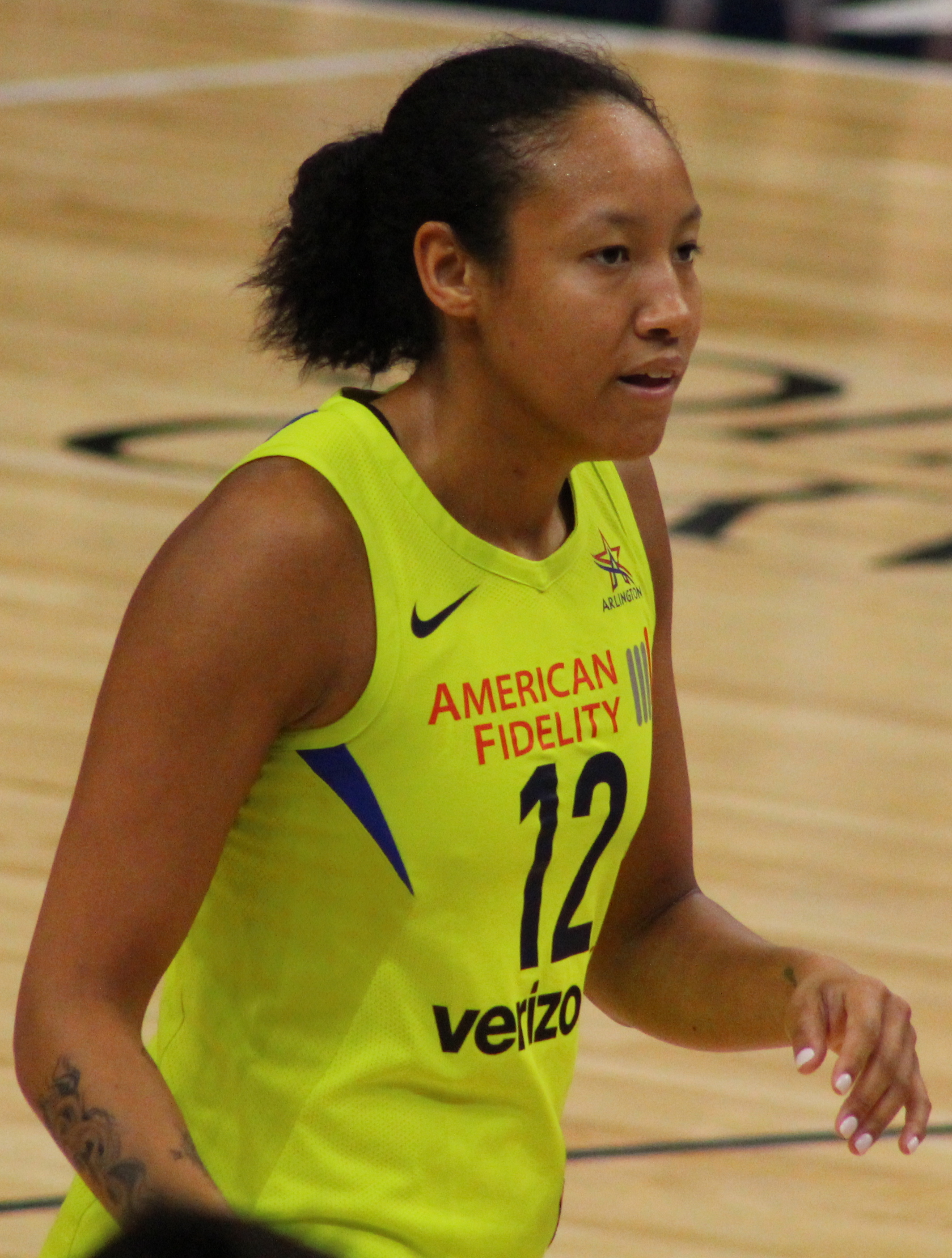

Personal information
- Born: June 27, 1994 (age 32) Ossining, New York, U.S.
- Listed height: 5 ft 8 in (1.73 m)
- Listed weight: 140 lb (64 kg)

Career information
- High school: Ossining (Ossining, New York)
- College: UConn (2013–2017)
- WNBA draft: 2017: 3rd round, 26th overall pick
- Drafted by: Dallas Wings
- Playing career: 2017–2018
- Position: Guard
- Number: 12

Career history
- 2017–2018: Dallas Wings

Career highlights
- 3× NCAA champion (2014–2016); AAC All-Freshman Team (2014); Miss New York Basketball (2013)
- Stats at Basketball Reference

Saniya Lynn Chong (born June 27, 1994) is an American former basketball player. She played her collegiate career for the University of Connecticut, where she won three national championships for the Huskies.

Prior to enrolling at UConn she played for Ossining High School in Ossining, New York.

== Career statistics ==
Legend
GP	Games played	GS	Games started	MPG	Minutes per game	RPG	Rebounds per game
APG	Assists per game	SPG	Steals per game	BPG	Blocks per game	PPG	Points per game
TO	Turnovers per game	FG%	Field-goal percentage	3P%	3-point field-goal percentage	FT%	Free-throw percentage
**Bold**	Career best	°	League leader

=== WNBA ===
==== Regular season ====
Year	Team	GP	GS	MPG	FG%	3P%	FT%	RPG	APG	SPG	BPG	TO	PPG
2017	Dallas	**33**	0	**11.0**	**35.9**	**23.7**	**86.2**	**0.9**	1.0	**0.7**	**0.1**	0.8	**2.7**
2018	Dallas	5	0	8.6	16.7	0.0	66.7	0.8	1.0	0.6	0.0	**0.2**	0.8
Career	2 years, 1 team	38	0	10.7	34.5	23.1	84.4	0.9	1.0	0.7	0.1	0.7	2.5

==== Playoffs ====
Year	Team	GP	GS	MPG	FG%	3P%	FT%	RPG	APG	SPG	BPG	TO	PPG
2017	Dallas	1	0	5.0	0.0	0.0	0.0	0.0	1.0	0.0	1.0	1.0	0.0
Career	1 year, 1 team	1	0	5.0	0.0	0.0	0.0	0.0	1.0	0.0	1.0	1.0	0.0

=== College ===
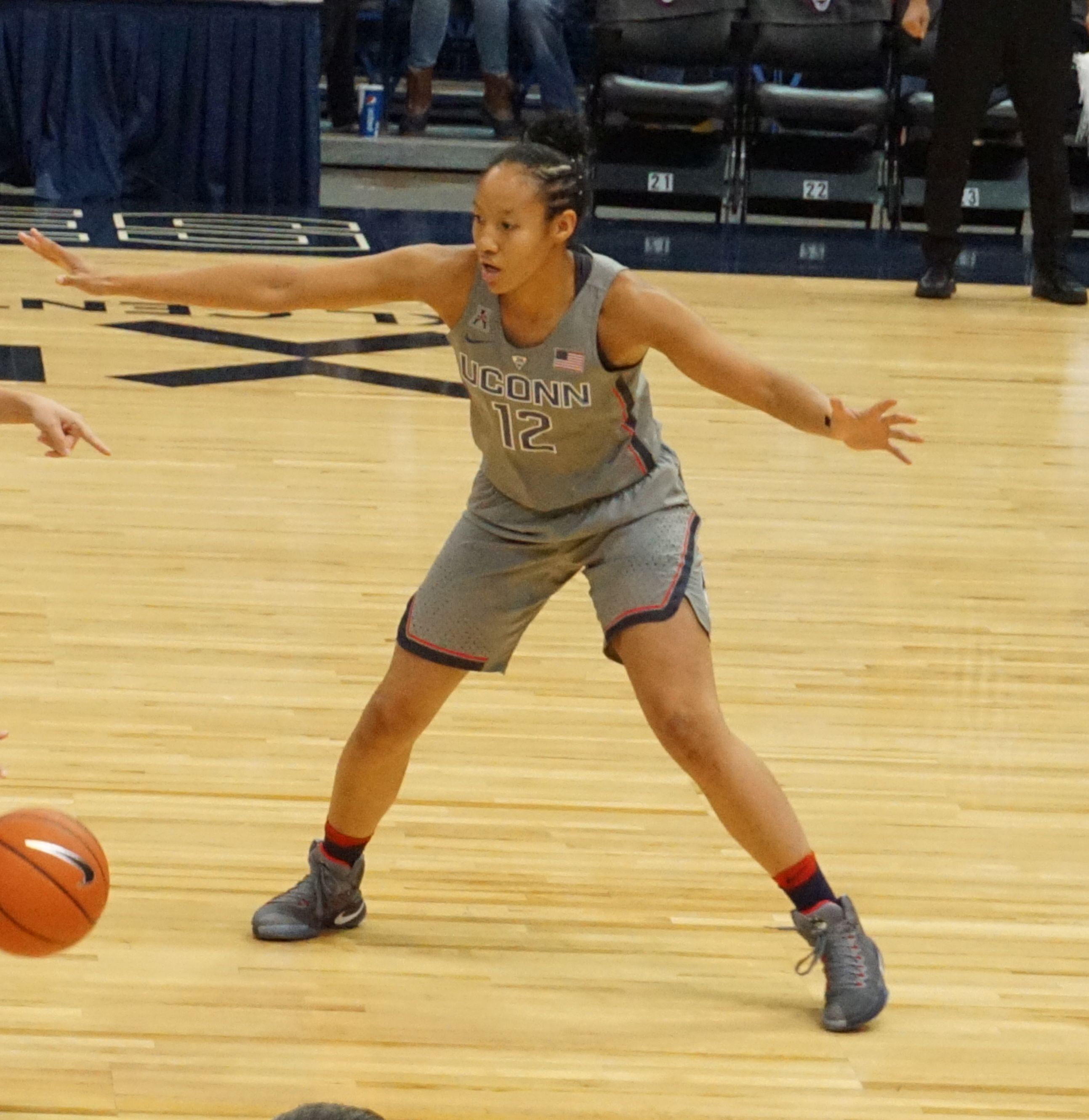
Chong playing for Connecticut in 2016

Legend
GP	Games played	GS	Games started	MPG	Minutes per game	RPG	Rebounds per game
APG	Assists per game	SPG	Steals per game	BPG	Blocks per game	PPG	Points per game
TO	Turnovers per game	FG%	Field-goal percentage	3P%	3-point field-goal percentage	FT%	Free-throw percentage
**Bold**	Career best	°	League leader

=== College ===
†	NCAA championship

Year	Team	GP	GS	Points	FG%	3P%	FT%	RPG	APG	SPG	BPG	PPG
2013–14†	Connecticut	39	4	183	.420	.323	.825	1.8	1.5	0.6	0.2	4.7
2014–15†	Connecticut	38	2	213	.470	.366	.742	1.9	2.0	0.7	0.2	5.6
2015–16†	Connecticut	33	3	123	.424	.368	.857	1.3	1.0	0.6	0.1	3.7
2016–17	Connecticut	34	33	279	.470	.395	.808	3.0	4.0	1.4	0.2	8.2
Career		144	42	798	.451	.365	.808	2.0	2.1	0.8	0.2	5.5
