= TS Ostrovia Ostrów Wielkopolski =

Polish basketball club

- League: Basket Liga Kobiet
- Founded: 1996
- Arena: Hala Sportowa SP 11
- Location: Bydgoszcz, Poland
- Team colors: White and Red
- Head coach: (Poland) Wojciech Szawarski

TS Ostrovia Ostrów Wielkopolski is a Polish professional women's basketball club that was founded in 1996 in the city of Ostrów Wielkopolski.TS Ostrovia Ostrów Wielkopolski plays in the Basket Liga Kobiet, the highest competition in Poland.
