= Jill Barta =

American basketball player and coach

Personal information
- Born: November 16, 1995 (age 30) Fairfield, Montana, U.S.
- Listed height: 6 ft 3 in (1.91 m)

Career information
- High school: Fairfield (Fairfield, Montana)
- College: Gonzaga (2015–2018)
- WNBA draft: 2018: 3rd round, 32nd overall pick
- Drafted by: Las Vegas Aces
- Playing career: 2018–2019

Career history
- 2018–2019: Budućnost Podgorica

Career highlights
- Gatorade Montana Girls Basketball Player of the Year (2014); WCC All-Freshman team (2016); WCC Tournament MVP (2017, 2018); WCC Player of the Year (2018)
- Stats at Basketball Reference

Jilliann Noel Barta (born November 16, 1995) is an American high school basketball coach and former professional basketball player. She played college, WNBA, overseas basketball, and currently coaches at Chinook High School for the lady sugarbeeters basketball team.

== Early life ==
Jill Barta grew up in Fairfield, Montana and attended Fairfield High School from 2010 to 2014 playing basketball for the lady eagles. She and others at the time were breaking state and school records. During her high school career, Barta and her teammates won four consecutive Montana State B Women's Basketball Championships. Additionally, she was part of 104 games of Fairfield's 120 game winning streak, one of the highest in the nation, just graduating a year before the final 16 games. Barta first became successful her freshman year with significant starting time. Later after in her final three years, she grew her playing time substantially, starting for the rest of her high school career. As a junior, Barta averaged 17.5 points, 9.6 rebounds, 3.4 blocks, and 3.8 steals. As a senior, she averaged 24.5 points, 9.5 rebounds, 3.3 blocks, 3.5 steals, and 2.8 assists. She finished her high school career with a total of 589 made field goals (fourth most in history), 57% shooting (tied for second best in history), 462 free-throws made (fourth in history), 73.1% free-throw made (eighth in history), and 163 blocks (eighth in history).

== College career ==
=== Freshman Years ===
Barta began her freshman year from 2014 to 2015 at Gonzaga University pursuing a bachelor's degree in special education and early childhood development. She took a redshirt. As a redshirted freshman in 2015–2016, she began her collegiate career with a game against Loyal Marymount and finished the year with an average of 22.5 minutes per game, 14 points per game (first freshman in program history to do so), 16.3 points per conference game (third in the WCC at the time), shot 44% from the field in league play (ninth in the WCC at the time), 5.8 rebounds per game (third on the team at the time), made a total of 37 three pointers (ranked second on the team at the time), made a total 83% from the free throw line (91% during conference games, third in conference and topped WCC at the time), and a total of 294 points in conference games which is the program's most. She achieved First Team All-West Coast Conference and WCC All-Freshman Team.

=== Sophomore Year ===
As a redshirt sophomore in 2016–2017, she played in all 33 games, starting 32 of them. She led her team with 16.8 points per game (4th in the league), 6 rebounds per game (13th in the WCC), an average of 26.3 minutes per game, shot 84.7% from the foul line (third in WCC, 5th all time at Gonzaga), made 41 three pointers, averaged 1.4 assists per game (4th on the team) and scored a total of 554 points. She achieved an entrance into the 1,000 point club (only the second sophomore to do so), All-WCC First Team, WCC Tournament MVP, WCC-All Tournament, Preason All-WCC, two time WCC Player of the Week, and Paradise Jam All-Tournament.

=== Junior Year ===
Barta played in 32 games her redshirt junior year (2017–2018), starting in 31 of them. In that time, she led her team with 18.8 points per game (2nd in league), averaged 8.3 rebounds per game and set a school record of 22 rebounds during a game against Belmount (led Gonzaga at the time, 5th in the WCC), had 13 double-doubles, shot 48.7% from the field (7th in the league), shot 87.6% from the free-throw line (led the WCC at the time, set a school record, 16th in the country), blocked a total of 30 shots (led team), and achieved a total of 603 points (6th all time at Gonzaga and 53th in the country at the time). She ended her career statistics with an entry into the 600 rebound club with 652 career rebounds (10th all time), a total of 1,620 career points (7th all time) and made a total of 442 career free-throws (3rd all time). She achieved WCC Player of the Year, First Team All-WCC, WCC All-Tournament, WCC Tournament MOP, Preseason All-WCC, Cheryl Miller Award Finalist and WBCA All-Region.

== Professional career ==
Following her junior year, Barta was drafted 32nd overall in the 2018 WNBA draft by the Las Vegas Aces. However, she was traded soon after to the Minnesota Lynx. Barta participated in training camp and played in one preseason game before being waived on May 9, 2018.

In December 2018, Barta signed a contract with the Budućnost Podgorica, a European professional team based out of Podgorica, Montenegro in the Women's Adriatic Basketball Association and Montegrin Prva A league. She debuted in January 2019 against Beroe with 19 points, four rebounds and two blocked shots. She made 10 of 11 attempted shots from the field in a game against Cinkarna Celje, scoring 26 points in 27 minutes. She concluded her season in March 2019 with a double-double and a WABA regular season title. However, she decided not to continue basketball overseas but instead return to Montana.

== Post-playing career ==
Before coaching at Chinook, Barta was an educator at Big Sandy K-12 school. However, she eventually left pursuing a career involving agriculture. She continued that career until accepting a coaching position as the head coach of the Chinook Sugarbeeters Lady Basketball team in July 2025.
