= Polonia Warsaw (women's basketball) =

Polish basketball team

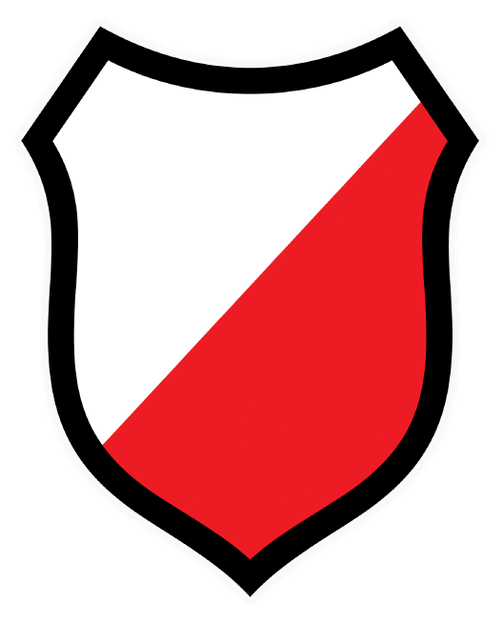
- Leagues: Basket Liga Kobiet
- Founded: 1911; 115 years ago
- History: 26 May 1925 - creation of a basketball team
- Arena: Centrum Sportu Wilanów
- Location: Warsaw, Poland
- Team colors
- President: (Poland) Łukasz Tusiński
- Head coach: (Montenegro) Jelena Škerović
- Championships: 2 Polish Championships: 1934, 1935; 3 Polish Cups: 1934, 1935, 1965; 1 Polish 1 Liga: 2021; 1 EWBL: 2024
- Website: skk.poloniawarszawa.com
Home	Away

SKK (Women's Basketball Section) Polonia Warsaw is a Polish professional women's basketball club based in Warsaw, currently playing in the Polish top division, the Basket Liga Kobiet (PGE BLK).

== History ==
The female sports games section of the Polonia Warsaw club was established in 1925. The first discipline of the section was hazena, and soon the players also started playing basketball and volleyball (usually practicing several sports at the same time). Primary official game in women's basketball was played by Polonia in 1930, against AZS Warsaw.

In the 1930s, Polonia's women basketball players were among the country's top players - they won two Polish championship titles (1934, 1935), twice won the Winter Cup of the Polish Sports Games Association (1934, 1935 - a tournament equivalent to today's Polish Cup), twice won the national vice-championship (1933, 1937) and once took third place (1939).

After World War II, the women's basketball section was revived in mid-1948, and the very next year the basketball players won the Polish vice-championship. In the 1950s, 1960s and 1970s, Polonia finished on the podium of the Polish championship six times. Its greatest successes - including the Polish vice-championship in 1976 - came under coach Bohdan Bartosiewicz, who held that position continuously from 1962 to 1976. In 1976 the Polonia women's basketball represented Poland as Vice-Champions in the Ronchetti Cup.

In 1978, the club was relegated from the highest level of the competition (then the First League) for the first time in its history. In the following years, it repeatedly made his way between the premier league and the second division. Before the 2000–01 season, despite remaining in the first division, the team was withdrawn from the competition for financial reasons, and the section was disbanded.

Reactivation - as SKK Polonia Warsaw - took place in 2011. On 17 April 2021, the club won the 1 Liga and earned the right to play in the Basket Liga Kobiet. In the first season after returning to the top league (2021–22), Polonia advanced to the play-offs, eventually finishing a high 7th in the league. In the 2022–23 season, the club competed in the European Women's Basketball League.

== Honours and titles ==
- Polish Championships:
  - Champions (2): 1934, 1935
  - Runners-up (4): 1933, 1937, 1949, 1975–76
  - Third place (6): 1939, 1950–51, 1955–56, 1964–65, 1966–67, 1974–75
- Polish Cup:
  - Winners (3): 1934, 1935, 1965
  - Runners-up (3): 1953, 1970, 1991
- LOTTO 3×3 Women's League Championship:
  - Champions (2): 2023, 2024
- European Women's Basketball League:
  - Champions (1): 2024
  - Third place (1): 2023
- Polish Junior Championships:
  - Champions (1): 1988
  - Runners-up (2): 1987, 1991
- Polish Championship in basketball 3×3 U23:
  - Champions (1): 2019

== Notable players ==
- (Poland) Edyta Czerwonka
- (Poland) Katarzyna Dulnik
- (Poland) Klaudia Sosnowska
- (Poland) Krystyna Szymańska-Lara
- (United States) Stacie Terry-Hutson

== Players ==
=== Current roster ===
Polonia Warsaw roster
Players
Coaches

Pos.	No.	Nat.	Name	Ht.	Age
PF	0	(United States)	Davenport, Erika	1.86 m (6 ft 1 in)	29 – 4 June 1997
PG	2	(Poland)	Wesołowska, Weronika	1.74 m (5 ft 9 in)	28 – 4 May 1998
PG	5	(United States)	Burse, Martha	1.68 m (5 ft 6 in)	30 – 22 June 1996
C	6	(Czech Republic)	Vitulová, Tereza	1.91 m (6 ft 3 in)	27 – 28 January 1999
SF	13	(Poland)	Sosnowska, Klaudia	1.86 m (6 ft 1 in)	36 – 6 April 1990
SF	42	(Poland)	Masłowska, Marta	1.81 m (5 ft 11 in)	23 – 21 March 2003
SG	90	(Poland)	Kusiak, Maja	1.74 m (5 ft 9 in)	20 – 2 January 2006
SF	91	(Poland)	Barańska, Wiktoria	1.82 m (6 ft 0 in)	22 – 17 April 2004
SF	92	(Poland)	Tomaszkiewicz, Patrycja	1.80 m (5 ft 11 in)	20 – 25 September 2006
C	93	(Poland)	Wiklak, Wiktoria	1.84 m (6 ft 0 in)	20 – 18 June 2006
PF	94	(Poland)	Zielińska, Iga	1.82 m (6 ft 0 in)	18 – 17 March 2008
SG	95	(Poland)	Burzyńska, Aleksandra	1.74 m (5 ft 9 in)	20 – 1 December 2005
PG	96	(Poland)	Feliga, Martyna	1.68 m (5 ft 6 in)	18 – 12 May 2008
PG	97	(Poland)	Stępińska, Martyna	1.68 m (5 ft 6 in)	18 – 30 April 2008
PG	98	(Poland)	Kania, Gabriella	1.70 m (5 ft 7 in)	17 – 17 January 2009

Head coach

- (Montenegro) Jelena Škerović

Legend

- (C) Team captain
- Injured

- Roster
Updated: 2026-09-26
