= Rebeka Abramovič =

Slovenian basketball player

No. 7 – KK Triglav Kranj
- Position: Shooting guard
- League: SKLŽ

Personal information
- Born: 6 November 1993 (age 33) Ljubljana, Slovenia
- Listed height: 5 ft 7 in (1.70 m)

Rebeka Abramovič (born 6 November 1993) is a Slovenian basketball player for KK Triglav Kranj and the Slovenian national team.

She participated at the EuroBasket Women 2017.
