= Snežana Aleksić =

Montenegrin basketball player (born 1989)

Kumanovo-Grizli
- Position: Shooting guard
- League: First League of North Macedonia; Adriatic League

Personal information
- Born: 14 January 1989 (age 37) Titograd, SFR Yugoslavia
- Listed height: 5 ft 8 in (1.73 m)

Career information
- WNBA draft: 2009: undrafted
- Playing career: 2005–present

Career history
- 2005–2009: Budućnost Podgorica
- 2009–2010: Šibenik Jolly JBS
- 2010: Neas Halkidonas
- 2010–2011: Gospić
- 2011–2012: Spartak Noginsk
- 2012–2013: Dynamo Moscow
- 2013–2014: Chevakata Vologda
- 2014: Canik Belediye
- 2015: Orduspor
- 2015–2016: PEAC-Pécs
- 2016: BC Aarau
- 2016–2017: Mann-Filter
- 2017: Quimsa
- 2017–2018: Valencia Basket
- 2018–2019: Beroe
- 2020: SV Halle Lions
- 2020–2021: Montana 2003
- 2021–2023: KAM Basket
- 2023-present: Kumanovo-Grizli
Medals
Women's basketball
Representing Serbia and Montenegro
European U18 Championship
Gold medal – first place	2006 Spain
European U16 Championship
Silver medal – second place	2004 Italy

Snežana Aleksić (born 14 January 1989 in Titograd, SFR Yugoslavia) is a Montenegrin female basketball player who plays as shooting guard. She currently plays for KAM Basket in the First Women's Basketball League of North Macedonia, and for the Montenegro national team.
