= Larisa Ocvirk =

Slovenian basketball player

No. 97 – ŽKK Celje
- Position: Small forward
- League: SKLŽ

Personal information
- Born: May 26, 1997 (age 29) Celje, Slovenia
- Listed height: 6 ft 2 in (1.88 m)

Larisa Ocvirk (born May 26, 1997) is a Slovenian basketball player for ŽKK Celje and the Slovenian national team.

She participated at the EuroBasket Women 2017.
