= Basket Liga Kobiet =

- Founded: 1929; 97 years ago
- First season: 1929
- Country: Poland
- Federation: PZKosz
- Confederation: FIBA Europe
- Number of teams: 10
- Level on pyramid: 1
- Relegation to: I Liga
- Domestic cup: Polish Cup
- Supercup: Polish Supercup
- International cup(s): EuroLeague; EuroCup
- Current champions: AZS UMCS Lublin (2nd title) (2025–26)
- Most championships: Wisła Kraków (25 titles)
- TV partners: emocje.tv
- Website: www.basketligakobiet.pl
- 2025–26 Basket Liga Kobiet

Basket Liga Kobiet (BLK), officially known as the Orlen Basket Liga Kobiet (OBLK) due to its sponsorship by Orlen, is a professional women's club basketball league in Poland. It constitutes the first and highest-tier level of the Polish league pyramid. The winning team of the final round are crowned the Polish Champions of that season.

The BLK, which is played under FIBA rules, currently consists of 10 teams (professional basketball's clubs). A BLK season is split into a league stage and a playoffs stage. At the end of the league stage, the top eight teams qualify for the playoff stage, while the remaining two face each other in a relegation play-out.

== History ==
Founded in 1929, it has been carried out every year since except for 1936 and World War II. Wisła Kraków is the most successful team in the championship with 25 titles, followed by AZS Warsaw, Lotos Gdynia and ŁKS Łódź with fourteen, eleven and nine respectively. Gdynia holds the longest winning streak with eight titles in a row between 1998 and 2005.

== Teams ==
=== 2025–26 teams ===
Team	Location	Arena
1KS Ślęza Wrocław	Wrocław	KGHM Ślęza Arena
Artego Bydgoszcz	Bydgoszcz	Grupa Moderator Arena
Contimax MOSIR Bochnia	Bochnia	Hala Widowiskowo–Sportowa
Enea AZS Politechnika Poznań	Poznań	Centrum Sportu Politechniki Poznańskiej
Energa Toruń	Toruń	Arena Toruń
Isands Wichoś Jelenia Góra	Jelenia Góra	Hala sportowa przy Szkole Podstawowej nr 8
KSSSE Enea AJP Gorzów Wielkopolski	Gorzów Wielkopolski	Arena Gorzów
Lotto AZS UMCS Lublin	Lublin	MOSiR im. Zdzisława Niedzieli
MB Zagłębie Sosnowiec	Sosnowiec	Arena Sosnowiec
SKK Polonia Warsaw	Warsaw	Centrum Sportu Wilanów
VBW Gdynia	Gdynia	Polsat Plus Arena Gdynia
Wisła Kraków	Kraków	Hala Główna TS Wisła

=== 2024–25 teams ===
Team	Location	Arena
Ślęza Wrocław	Wrocław	KGHM Ślęza Arena
Zagłębie Sosnowiec	Sosnowiec	Arena Sosnowiec
KGHM BC Polkowice	Polkowice	Hala Sportowa - Polkowice
KS Basket Bydgoszcz	Bydgoszcz	Artego Arena
Energa Polski Cukier Toruń	Toruń	Arena Toruń
PolskaStrefaInwestycji Enea Gorzów Wielkopolski	Gorzów Wielkopolski	Arena Gorzów
VBW Gdynia	Gdynia	Hala gier GCS
SKK Polonia Warsaw	Warsaw	Centrum Sportu Wilanów
Enea AZS Politechnika Poznań	Poznań	Centrum Sportu Politechniki Poznańskiej
Polski-Cukier AZS UMCS Lublin	Lublin	MOSiR im. Zdzisława Niedzieli

=== 2023–24 teams ===
Team	Location	Arena
Ślęza Wrocław	Wrocław	Hala Sportowa AWF Wrocław
Zagłębie Sosnowiec	Sosnowiec	Hala Widowiskowo-Sportowa
BC Polkowice	Polkowice	Hala Sportowa - Polkowice
Basket 25 Bydgoszcz	Bydgoszcz	Artego Arena
Energa Krajowa Grupa Spożywcza Toruń	Toruń	Hala Sportowo-Widowiskowa Toruń
PolskaStrefaInwestycji Enea Gorzów Wielkopolski	Gorzów Wielkopolski	Hala AJP
VBW Arka Gdynia	Gdynia	Gdynia Arena
SKK Polonia Warsaw	Warsaw	Centrum Sportu Wilanów
MKS Pruszków	Pruszków	Hala Znicz
Enea AZS Poznań	Poznań	Hala Politechniki Poznańskiej
Polski-Cukier AZS UMCS Lublin	Lublin	MOSiR im. Zdzisława Niedzieli

=== 2022–23 & 2023–24 teams ===
Team	Location	Arena
Ślęza Wrocław	Wrocław	Hala Sportowa AWF Wrocław
Zagłębie Sosnowiec	Sosnowiec	Hala Widowiskowo-Sportowa
BC Polkowice	Polkowice	Hala Sportowa - Polkowice
Basket 25 Bydgoszcz	Bydgoszcz	Artego Arena
Energa Krajowa Grupa Spożywcza Toruń	Toruń	Hala Sportowo-Widowiskowa Toruń
PolskaStrefaInwestycji Enea Gorzów Wielkopolski	Gorzów Wielkopolski	Hala AJP
VBW Arka Gdynia	Gdynia	Gdynia Arena
SKK Polonia Warsaw	Warsaw	Centrum Sportu Wilanów
MKS Pruszków	Pruszków	Hala Znicz
Enea AZS Poznań	Poznań	Hala Politechniki Poznańskiej
Polski-Cukier AZS UMCS Lublin	Lublin	MOSiR im. Zdzisława Niedzieli

=== 2020–21 teams ===
Team	Location	Arena
Ślęza Wrocław	Wrocław	Hala Sportowa AWF Wrocław
Zagłębie Sosnowiec	Sosnowiec	Hala Widowiskowo-Sportowa
CCC Polkowice	Polkowice	Hala Sportowa - Polkowice
Basket 25 Bydgoszcz	Bydgoszcz	Artego Arena
MMKS Katarzynki Toruń	Toruń	Hala Sportowo-Widowiskowa Toruń
PolskaStrefaInwestycji Enea Gorzów Wielkopolski	Gorzów Wielkopolski	Hala AJP
VBW Arka Gdynia	Gdynia	Gdynia Arena
GTK Gdynia	Gdynia	Gdynia Arena
AZS Uniwersytet Gdańsk	Gdańsk	MOSiR Gdańsk
AZS Politechnika Gdańsk	Gdańsk	Centrum Sportu Akademickiego Politechniki Gdańskiej
Enea AZS Poznań	Poznań	Hala Politechniki Poznańskiej
Pszczółka Polski-Cukier AZS UMCS Lublin	Lublin	MOSiR im. Zdzisława Niedzieli

== League championships ==
Wins	Team	Year(s) won
25	Wisła Kraków	1963, 1964, 1965, 1966, 1968, 1969, 1970, 1971, 1975, 1976, 1977, 1979, 1980, 1981, 1984, 1985, 1988, 2006, 2007, 2008, 2011, 2012, 2014, 2015, 2016
14	AZS Warsaw	1930, 1931, 1937, 1938, 1947, 1950, 1953, 1954, 1955, 1956, 1958, 1960, 1961, 1962
14	VBW Arka Gdynia	1996, 1998, 1999, 2000, 2001, 2002, 2003, 2004, 2005, 2009, 2010, 2020, 2021, 2025
9	ŁKS Łódź	1967, 1972, 1973, 1974, 1982, 1983, 1986, 1995, 1997
5	BC Polkowice	2013, 2018, 2019, 2022, 2024
4	Włókniarz Pabianice	1989, 1990, 1991, 1992
4	Spójnia Warsaw	1948, 1949, 1951, 1952
3	IKP Łódź	1932, 1933, 1939
2	Ślęza Wrocław	1987, 2017
2	Olimpia Poznań	1993, 1994
2	Polonia Warsaw	1934, 1935
2	AZS UMCS Lublin	2023, 2026
1	AZS Poznań	1978
1	Wawel Kraków	1959
1	Lech Poznań	1957
1	TUR Łódź	1946
1	KS Cracovia	1929

== In 2022–23 European competitions ==
Club	Competition	Progress
BC Polkowice	EuroLeague Women	Regular season
PolskaStrefaInwestycji Enea Gorzów Wielkopolski	EuroCup Women	Regular season
VBW Arka Gdynia	EuroCup Women	Regular season
Polski-Cukier AZS-UMCS Lublin	EuroCup Women	Regular season
Basket 25 Bydgoszcz	EuroCup Women	Regular season
SKK Polonia Warsaw	EWBL	Regular season

== See also ==
- Sports in Poland
- Basketball in Poland
- Polish basketball league system
- Polish Basketball League
