= 2017 WNBA Finals =

Women's basketball championship series

Team	Coach	Wins
Minnesota Lynx	Cheryl Reeve	3
Los Angeles Sparks	Brian Agler	2
- Dates: September 24 – October 4
- MVP: (United States) Sylvia Fowles (Minnesota Lynx)
- Hall of Famers: Lynx: Sylvia Fowles (2025); Maya Moore (2025); Seimone Augustus (2024); Lindsay Whalen (2022); Sparks: Candace Parker (2026)
- Eastern finals: Los Angeles Sparks defeated Phoenix Mercury, 3–0 (Note: the semifinal rounds as of 2016 were not divided by conference)
- Western finals: Minnesota Lynx defeated Washington Mystics, 3–0

The 2017 WNBA Finals, officially the WNBA Finals 2017 presented by Verizon for sponsorship reasons, was the best-of-five championship series for the 2017 season of the Women's National Basketball Association (WNBA), tipping off on September 24. It was a rematch of the previous year's finals matchup. The top-seeded Minnesota Lynx held home court advantage in the Finals, and won three games to two against the second-seeded Los Angeles Sparks. The Sparks won a semifinal series against the Phoenix Mercury to determine one of the Finals berths; the first-seeded Lynx defeated the Washington Mystics to earn the other. Sylvia Fowles was named the 2017 WNBA Finals MVP.

== Road to the Finals ==
=== Standings and playoffs ===
#	Western Conference	W	L	PCT	GB	Home	Road	Conf.
1	Minnesota Lynx - **(1)**	27	7	.794	–	15–2	12–5	13–3
2	Los Angeles Sparks - **(2)**	26	8	.765	1	16–1	10–7	12–4
3	Phoenix Mercury - **(5)**	18	16	.529	9	9–8	9–8	7–9
4	Dallas Wings - **(7)**	16	18	.471	11	10–7	6–11	7–9
5	Seattle Storm - **(8)**	15	19	.441	12	10–7	5–12	8–8
6	San Antonio Stars - **e**	8	26	.235	19	6–11	2–15	1–15

#	Eastern Conference	W	L	PCT	GB	Home	Road	Conf.
1	New York Liberty - **(3)**	22	12	.647	-	13–4	9–8	10–6
2	Connecticut Sun - **(4)**	21	13	.636	1	12–5	9–6	10–6
3	Washington Mystics - **(6)**	18	16	.529	4	11–6	7–10	12-4
4	Chicago Sky - **e**	12	22	.353	10	4–13	8–9	6–10
5	Atlanta Dream - **e**	12	22	.353	10	9–8	3–14	5–11
6	Indiana Fever - **e**	9	25	.265	13	6–11	3–14	4–12

**First round** Single elimination (Sept. 6)
5	**Phoenix Mercury**	**79**
8	Seattle Storm	69
6	**Washington Mystics**	**86**
7	Dallas Wings	76

**Second round** Single elimination (Sept. 10)
4	Connecticut Sun	83
5	**Phoenix Mercury**	**88**
3	New York Liberty	68
6	**Washington Mystics**	**82**

**Semifinals**; Best-of-5 (Sept. 12 – Sept. 17)
2	**Los Angeles Sparks**	**3**
5	Phoenix Mercury	0
1	**Minnesota Lynx**	**3**
6	Washington Mystics	0

**WNBA Finals**; Best-of-5 (Sept. 24 – Oct. 4)
1	**Minnesota Lynx**	**3**
2	Los Angeles Sparks	2

Note: Teams re-seeded after second round and semi-finals.

- **Bold** – Game or series winner
- Italic – Team with home-court advantage

== Series summary ==
All times are in Eastern Daylight Time (UTC−4).

=== Game 1 ===
ABC

September 24
3:30pm ET

Game 1

Los Angeles Sparks 85, Minnesota Lynx 84
Scoring by quarter: 32–11, 11–22, 25–23, 17–28
Pts: Gray 27; Rebs: Parker 12; Asts: Gray 6	Pts: Moore 27; Rebs: Fowles 13; Asts: Whalen 6
Los Angeles leads series, 1-0

Williams Arena, Minneapolis, MN
Attendance: 11,823
Referees: Cheryl Flores, Kurt Walker, Jeff Wooten

=== Game 2 ===
ESPN2

September 26
8:00pm ET

Game 2

Los Angeles Sparks 68, Minnesota Lynx 70
Scoring by quarter: 10–28, 16–17, 24–15, 18–10
Pts: Parker 17; Rebs: Ogwumike 13; Asts: Parker 6	Pts: Whalen 14; Rebs: Fowles 17; Asts: Brunson, Whalen 3
Series tied, 1-1

Williams Arena, Minneapolis, MN
Attendance: 11,434
Referees: Maj Forsberg, Bryon Jarrett, Billy Smith

=== Game 3 ===
ESPN2

September 29
9:00pm ET

Game 3

Minnesota Lynx 64, Los Angeles Sparks 75
Scoring by quarter: 8–17, 18–15, 22–24, 16–19
Pts: Moore 16; Rebs: Fowles 11; Asts: Jones 4	Pts: Ogwumike, Sims 16; Rebs: Ogwumike 10; Asts: Gray 7
Los Angeles leads series, 2-1

Staples Center, Los Angeles, CA
Attendance: 13,500
Referees: Sue Blauch, Eric Brewton, Roy Gulbeyan

=== Game 4 ===
ESPN

October 1
8:30pm ET

Game 4

Minnesota Lynx 80, Los Angeles Sparks 69
Scoring by quarter: 21–16, 22–15, 18–13, 19–25
Pts: Fowles 22; Rebs: Fowles 14; Asts: Whalen 8	Pts: Sims 18; Rebs: Ogwumike, Parker 8 Asts: Gray 9
Series tied, 2-2

Staples Center, Los Angeles, CA
Attendance: 13,500
Referees: Maj Forsberg, Billy Smith, Kurt Walker

=== Game 5 ===
ESPN

October 4
8:00pm ET

Game 5

Los Angeles Sparks 76, Minnesota Lynx 85
Scoring by quarter: 19–21, 16–20, 21–19, 20–25
Pts: Parker 19; Rebs: Parker 15; Asts: Gray 8	Pts: Moore 18; Rebs: Fowles 20; Asts: Whalen 8
Minnesota wins WNBA Finals, 3-2

Williams Arena, Minneapolis, MN
Attendance: 14,632
Referees: Sue Blauch, Roy Gulbeyan, Byron Jarrett
