= 2017 New York Liberty season =

- Head coach: Bill Laimbeer
- Arena: Madison Square Garden

Results
- Record: 22–12 (.647)
- Place: 1st (Eastern)
- Playoff finish: Lost in Second Round to Washington

Media
- Television: MSG Network (MSG), MSG Plus (MSG+)

The 2017 New York Liberty season was the 21st season for the New York Liberty franchise of the WNBA, and their final season under head coach, Bill Laimbeer. The season tipped off on May 13. The Liberty rode an end of season surge to the top of the Eastern Conference and the third overall see in the WNBA playoffs. The Liberty were 12–12 on August 4, but won 10 straight games to finish the season with a 22–12 record. The team lost in the second round of the playoffs to the Washington Mystics after receiving a first round bye.

== Transactions ==
=== WNBA draft ===
Round	Pick	Player	Nationality	School/Team/Country
2	14	Lindsay Allen	United States	Notre Dame
3	34	Kai James	United States	Florida State

== Roster ==
2017 New York Liberty roster
Players
Coaches

Pos.	No.	Nat.	Name	Height	Weight	DOB	From	Yrs
G/F	9	(Australia)	Allen, Rebecca	6' 2" (1.88m)	164 lb (74kg)	1992-11-06	Australia	3
G	15	(United States)	Boyd, Brittany (injured)	5' 9" (1.75m)	156 lb (71kg)	1993-06-11	California	3
F/C	31	(United States)	Charles, Tina	6' 4" (1.93m)	186 lb (84kg)	1988-12-05	Connecticut	8
G	10	(Russia)	Prince, Epiphanny	5' 9" (1.75m)	179 lb (81kg)	1988-01-11	Rutgers	8
G	14	(United States)	Rodgers, Sugar	5' 9" (1.75m)	166 lb (75kg)	1989-12-08	Georgetown	6
C	41	(United States)	Stokes, Kiah	6' 3" (1.91m)	191 lb (87kg)	1993-03-30	Connecticut	3
C	7	(United States)	Vaughn, Kia	6' 4" (1.93m)	198 lb (90kg)	1987-01-24	Rutgers	9
G	8	(United States)	Hartley, Bria	5' 8" (1.73m)	145 lb (66kg)	1992-09-30	Connecticut	4
C	17	(Sweden)	Zahui B., Amanda	6' 5" (1.96m)	250 lb (113kg)	1993-09-08	Minnesota	3
G	1	(United States)	Zellous, Shavonte	5' 10" (1.78m)	188 lb (85kg)	1986-08-28	Pittsburgh	9
F/C	4	(Canada)	Raincock-Ekunwe, Nayo	6' 2" (1.88m)	175 lb (79kg)	1991-08-29	Simon Fraser	R
G	12	(United States)	Allen, Lindsay	5' 8" (1.73m)	144 lb (65kg)	1995-03-20	Notre Dame	R

Head coach
(United States) Bill Laimbeer (Notre Dame)
Assistant coaches
(United States) Katie Smith (Ohio State)
(United States) Herb Williams (Ohio State)
Athletic trainer
(United States) Rosemary Ragle (Troy)
Strength and conditioning coach
(United States) Kevin Duffy (Ohio)

Legend

- (C) Team captain
- (DP) Unsigned draft pick
- (FA) Free agent
- (S) Suspended
- Injured

== Game log ==
=== Preseason ===
2017 pre-season game log
May: 1–2 (Home: 1–2; Road: 0–0)

Game	Date	Team	Score	High points	High rebounds	High assists	Location Attendance	Record
1	May 2	Los Angeles	W 81-65	Vaughn (14)	Vaughn (6)	Boyd (4)	Mohegan Sun Arena; 2,782	1–0
2	May 3	Chicago	L 75-86	Charles (14)	Hartley (6)	Charles (3)	Mohegan Sun Arena; N/A	1-1
3	May 7	Connecticut	L 57-79	Charles (20)	Charles (9)	Zahui B. (3)	Columbia University; 388	1–2

2017 pre-season schedule

=== Regular season ===
2017 game log
Total: 22-12 (Home: 13–4; Road: 9–9)
May: 2–3 (Home: 1–2; Road: 1–1)

Game	Date	Team	Score	High points	High rebounds	High assists	Location Attendance	Record
1	May 13	San Antonio	W 73-64	Charles (12)	Charles (7)	Zellous (4)	Madison Square Garden; 8,207	1–0
2	May 18	Minnesota	L 71-90	Rodgers (20)	Tied (7)	Tied (3)	Madison Square Garden; 7,004	1-1
3	May 23	Phoenix	W 69-67	Prince (24)	Charles (11)	Rodgers (4)	Talking Stick Resort Arena; 7,886	2–1
4	May 26	Seattle	L 81-87	Charles (28)	Tied (9)	Prince (7)	KeyArena; 5,860	2-2
5	May 30	Los Angeles	L 75-90	Charles (25)	Zellous (7)	Tied (5)	Madison Square Garden; 8,108	2–3

June : 5–3 (Home: 4–1; Road: 1–2)

Game	Date	Team	Score	High points	High rebounds	High assists	Location Attendance	Record
6	June 2	Dallas	W 93-89	Charles (36)	Stokes (15)	Rodgers (5)	Madison Square Garden; 7,426	3-3
7	June 4	Phoenix	W 88-72	Stokes (23)	Stokes (14)	Zellous (5)	Madison Square Garden; 7,831	4–3
8	June 7	Atlanta	W 76-61	Charles (18)	Stokes (17)	Allen (4)	Madison Square Garden; 14,816	5–3
9	June 11	Seattle	W 94-86	Tied (21)	Charles (14)	Rodgers (5)	Madison Square Garden; 8,564	6–3
10	June 14	Connecticut	L 76-96	Charles (17)	Tied (5)	Tied (2)	Mohegan Sun Arena; 4,818	6–4
11	June 16	Dallas	W 102-93	Zellous (28)	Charles (10)	Zellous (6)	College Park Center; 3,152	7–4
12	June 23	Connecticut	L 89-94	Charles (20)	Charles (11)	Charles (6)	Madison Square Garden; 10,240	7–5
13	June 29	Washington	L 54-67	Zellous (17)	Vaughn (9)	Prince (3)	Verizon Center; 5,490	7–6

July : 5–4 (Home: 2–1; Road: 3–3)

Game	Date	Team	Score	High points	High rebounds	High assists	Location Attendance	Record
14	July 2	Atlanta	L 72-81	Charles (21)	Zellous (9)	Prince (9)	McCamish Pavilion; 3,521	7-7
15	July 6	Seattle	W 79-70	Charles (29)	Charles (12)	Zellous (5)	KeyArena; 4,397	8–7
16	July 9	Phoenix	L 69-81	Charles (29)	Prince (9)	Prince (4)	Talking Stick Resort Arena; 9,413	8-8
17	July 14	Chicago	L 68-78	Charles (23)	Charles (19)	Prince (4)	Madison Square Garden; 9,341	8–9
18	July 16	Washington	W 85-55	Hartley (15)	Stokes (10)	Rodgers (5)	Madison Square Garden; 10,204	9-9
19	July 19	Connecticut	W 96-80	Charles (28)	Charles (17)	Zellous (6)	Madison Square Garden; 17,443	10–9
20	July 25	Minnesota	L 75-76	Charles (24)	Charles (16)	Allen (5)	Xcel Energy Center; 10,123	10-10
21	July 28	Indiana	W 85-84	Charles (25)	Stokes (10)	Zellous (5)	Bankers Life Fieldhouse; 6,617	11–10
22	July 30	Chicago	W 86-82	Charles (15)	Stokes (16)	Charles (5)	Allstate Arena; 5,834	12–10

August : 8–2 (Home: 5–0; Road: 3–2)

Game	Date	Team	Score	High points	High rebounds	High assists	Location Attendance	Record
23	August 1	San Antonio	L 81-93	Hartley (17)	Charles (8)	Hartley (5)	AT&T Center; 3,430	12–11
24	August 4	Los Angeles	L 74-87	Hartley (16)	Stokes (7)	Tied (4)	Staples Center; 11,617	12-12
25	August 8	Indiana	W 81-76	Charles (26)	Zellous (8)	Charles (4)	Madison Square Garden; 10,068	13–12
26	August 11	Atlanta	W 83-77	Zellous (20)	Charles (8)	Zellous (4)	McCamish Pavilion; 5,158	14–12
27	August 13	Los Angeles	W 83-69	Charles (21)	Tied (7)	Tied (5)	Madison Square Garden; 10,083	15–12
28	August 18	Connecticut	W 82-70	Charles (24)	Tied (7)	Allen (3)	Mohegan Sun Arena; 7,016	16–12
29	August 20	Minnesota	W 70-61	Charles (19)	Charles (9)	Tied (6)	Madison Square Garden; 10,007	17–12
30	August 23	Indiana	W 71-50	Charles (13)	Charles (9)	Charles (3)	Bankers Life Fieldhouse; 7,118	18–12
31	August 25	Washington	W 74-66	Tied (20)	Vaughn (9)	Hartley (3)	Madison Square Garden; 9,340	19–12
32	August 27	Chicago	W 92-62	Charles (22)	Stokes (10)	Rodgers (6)	Madison Square Garden; 9,317	20–12

September : 2–0 (Home: 1–0; Road: 1–0)

Game	Date	Team	Score	High points	High rebounds	High assists	Location Attendance	Record
33	September 1	San Antonio	W 81-69	Tied (16)	Charles (8)	Tied (4)	Madison Square Garden; 10,108	21–12
34	September 3	Dallas	W 82-81	Prince (20)	Charles (18)	Tied (3)	College Park Center; 4,701	22–12

2017 season schedule

=== Playoffs ===
2017 playoff game log
WNBA Second Round: 0–1 (Home: 0–0; Road: 0–1)

Game	Date	Team	Score	High points	High rebounds	High assists	Location Attendance	Series
1	September 10	Washington	L 68-82	Charles (18)	Tied (6)	Hartley (5)	Madison Square Garden; 9,538	0–1

2017 playoff schedule

== Standings ==
#	Eastern Conference	W	L	PCT	GB	Home	Road	Conf.
1	New York Liberty - **(3)**	22	12	.647	-	13–4	9–8	10–6
2	Connecticut Sun - **(4)**	21	13	.636	1	12–5	9–6	10–6
3	Washington Mystics - **(6)**	18	16	.529	4	11–6	7–10	12-4
4	Chicago Sky - **e**	12	22	.353	10	4–13	8–9	6–10
5	Atlanta Dream - **e**	12	22	.353	10	9–8	3–14	5–11
6	Indiana Fever - **e**	9	25	.265	13	6–11	3–14	4–12

=== Playoffs ===
**First round** Single elimination (Sept. 6)
5	**Phoenix Mercury**	**79**
8	Seattle Storm	69
6	**Washington Mystics**	**86**
7	Dallas Wings	76

**Second round** Single elimination (Sept. 10)
4	Connecticut Sun	83
5	**Phoenix Mercury**	**88**
3	New York Liberty	68
6	**Washington Mystics**	**82**

**Semifinals**; Best-of-5 (Sept. 12 – Sept. 17)
2	**Los Angeles Sparks**	**3**
5	Phoenix Mercury	0
1	**Minnesota Lynx**	**3**
6	Washington Mystics	0

**WNBA Finals**; Best-of-5 (Sept. 24 – Oct. 4)
1	**Minnesota Lynx**	**3**
2	Los Angeles Sparks	2

Note: Teams re-seeded after second round and semi-finals.

- **Bold** – Game or series winner
- Italic – Team with home-court advantage

== Statistics ==
Legend
GP	Games played	GS	Games started	MPG	Minutes per game	RPG	Rebounds per game
APG	Assists per game	SPG	Steals per game	BPG	Blocks per game	PPG	Points per game
FG%	Field-goal percentage	3P%	3-point field-goal percentage	FT%	Free-throw percentage	TO	Turnovers per game
PF	Fouls per game		Team leader		League leader

=== Regular season ===
Player	GP	GS	MPG	FG%	3P%	FT%	RPG	APG	SPG	BPG	PPG
Tina Charles	34	34	32.2	44.2%	34.8%	80.4%	9.4	2.6	0.8	0.7	19.7
Brittany Boyd	2	2	16.0	60.0%	0.0%	72.7%	4.0	2.5	1.5	0.0	13.0
Epiphanny Prince	28	25	26.8	40.1%	34.4%	87.8%	3.6	2.9	1.3	0.3	12.0
Shavonte Zellous	34	34	29.1	42.3%	33.3%	82.3%	4.0	2.8	0.9	0.2	11.7
Sugar Rodgers	33	15	25.6	33.9%	34.2%	81.5%	3.8	2.3	0.9	0.5	10.5
Bria Hartley	34	24	21.4	41.6%	34.5%	74.4%	2.1	2.1	0.6	0.4	7.8
Kia Vaughn	28	22	19.6	53.6%	—	58.3%	4.9	0.7	0.4	0.4	5.8
Kiah Stokes	34	12	19.6	53.1%	0.0%	79.6%	6.3	0.9	0.4	1.1	4.8
Nayo Raincock-Ekunwe	32	2	9.2	52.6%	0.0%	59.0%	1.8	0.3	0.2	0.0	3.7
Rebecca Allen	33	0	9.2	37.6%	34.1%	33.3%	2.0	0.5	0.4	0.4	2.8
Cierra Burdick	6	0	6.0	54.5%	100%	—	1.0	0.7	0.2	0.2	2.2
Amanda Zahui B.	29	0	5.3	40.0%	25.0%	75.0%	1.1	0.3	0.2	0.2	2.2
Lindsay Allen	28	0	13.4	37.1%	0.0%	70.0%	1.5	2.2	0.6	0.0	1.9
Ameryst Alston	2	0	1.5	50.0%	—	—	1.0	0.5	0.0	0.0	1.0
Chelsea Hopkins	1	0	1.0	—	—	—	—	—	—	—	—

== Awards and honors ==
Recipient	Award	Date awarded	Ref.
Epiphanny Prince	Player of the Week award	May 29, 2017	
Tina Charles	Player of the Week award	June 4, 2017	
Tina Charles	Player of the Week award	June 11, 2017	
Tina Charles	Player of the Week award	July 23, 2017	
Tina Charles	Player of the Week award	July 30, 2017	
Tina Charles	Player of the Week award	August 21, 2017	
Tina Charles	Player of the Week award	August 28, 2017	
Tina Charles	Player of the Week award	September 5, 2017	
Tina Charles	Player of the Month award	July	
Tina Charles	Player of the Month award	August	
Sugar Rodgers	Sixth Woman of the Year	Season-Long Award	
