= 2017 Los Angeles Sparks season =

- Head coach: Brian Agler
- Arena: Staples Center

Results
- Record: 26–8 (.765)
- Place: 2nd (Western)
- Playoff finish: Lost WNBA Finals 3–2 (Minnesota)

Media
- Television: Spectrum SportsNet; ESPN2, NBATV

The 2017 Los Angeles Sparks season was the 21st season for the Los Angeles Sparks of the Women's National Basketball Association. The Sparks were the defending WNBA champions. The season tipped off on May 13.

The Sparks started the season winning two games, losing two games and then winning two more games. This stretch was followed by a loss to Dallas before the Sparks won eight straight games. Their winning streak was ended as they lost a Finals re-match with Minnesota. They lost the following game to Seattle before winning five of their next six games. They started August slowly, going 2–2 in their first four games of the month, but finished the month on a five game winning streak. The Sparks only had two regular season games in September, and they won them both. They finished the regular season with a 26–8 record, and secured the second seed in the 2017 WNBA Playoffs, finishing one game out of the first seed.

As the second seed in the playoffs, the Sparks earned a bye into the Semifinals. There, they faced-off against the Phoenix Mercury. Los Angeles had won the regular season series between the two teams 3–0 and won the playoff series by the same result. The closest game was Game 3, which Los Angeles won 89–87 to complete the sweep. The victory setup a finals re-match with Minnesota. The Sparks won the first and third games of the finals, but could not finish off the Lynx and lost the Finals 2 games to 3. The closest game was Game 1, which Los Angeles won by a single point. Minnesota won the final two games of the series by eleven points and nine points.

== WNBA draft ==
Round	Pick	Player	Nationality	School/Team/Country
1	11	Sydney Wiese	United States	Oregon State
3	35	Saicha Grant-Allen	Canada	Dayton

== Trades and Roster Changes ==
Date	Transaction
February 8, 2017	Alana Beard resigned with Los Angeles Sparks
July 28, 2017	Signed Sandrine Gruda

== Roster ==
2017 Los Angeles Sparks roster
Players
Coaches

Pos.	No.	Nat.	Name	Height	Weight	DOB	From	Yrs
G/F	0	(United States)	Beard, Alana	5' 11" (1.8m)	160 lb (73kg)	1982-05-14	Duke	11
G	1	(United States)	Sims, Odyssey	5' 8" (1.73m)	160 lb (73kg)	1992-07-13	Baylor	3
G	2	(United States)	Williams, Riquna	5' 7" (1.7m)	154 lb (70kg)	1990-05-28	Miami (FL)	4
F	3	(United States)	Parker, Candace	6' 4" (1.93m)	175 lb (79kg)	1986-04-19	Tennessee	9
C	7	(France)	Gruda, Sandrine	6' 4" (1.93m)	185 lb (84kg)	1987-06-25	France	5
G	12	(United States)	Gray, Chelsea	5' 11" (1.8m)	170 lb (77kg)	1992-10-08	Duke	2
F	17	(United States)	Carson, Essence	6' 0" (1.83m)	163 lb (74kg)	1986-07-28	Rutgers	9
G	24	(United States)	Wiese, Sydney	6' 0" (1.83m)		1995-06-16	Oregon State	R
F/C	26	(Senegal)	Diarra, Maimouna	6' 6" (1.98m)		1991-01-30	Senegal	R
F/C	30	(United States)	Ogwumike, Nneka	6' 2" (1.88m)	174 lb (79kg)	1990-07-02	Stanford	5
F	33	(United States)	Jackson, Tiffany	6' 3" (1.91m)	185 lb (84kg)	1985-04-26	Texas	8
C	42	(United States)	Lavender, Jantel	6' 4" (1.93m)	185 lb (84kg)	1988-11-12	Ohio State	6

Head coach
(United States) Brian Agler (Wittenberg)
Assistant coaches
(United States) Tonya Edwards (Tennessee)
(United States) Bobbie Kelsey (Stanford)
Athletic trainer
(United States) Courtney Watson (California)
Strength and conditioning coach
(United States) Kelly Dormandy (Springfield)

Legend

- (C) Team captain
- (DP) Unsigned draft pick
- (FA) Free agent
- (S) Suspended
- Injured

== Game log ==
=== Preseason ===
2017 pre-season game log
May: 1–2 (Home: 1–0; Road: 0–2)

Game	Date	Team	Score	High points	High rebounds	High assists	Location Attendance	Record
1	May 2	New York	L 65-81	Samuelson (9)	Wiese (6)	Tied (2)	Mohegan Sun Arena; 2,782	0-1
2	May 3	Connecticut	L 62-79	Sims (12)	Warley-Talbert (11)	Sims (5)	Mohegan Sun Arena; 2,809	0-2
3	May 6	San Antonio	W 73-59	Ruef (18)	Ruef (7)	Gray (5)	Pasadena College; 1,000	1-2

2017 pre-season schedule

=== Regular season ===
2017 game log
Total: 26–8 (Home: 16–1; Road: 10–7)
May: 3–2 (Home: 2–0; Road: 1–2)

Game	Date	Team	Score	High points	High rebounds	High assists	Location Attendance	Record
1	May 13	Seattle	W 78-68	Ogwumike (23)	Jackson (8)	Gray (8)	Staples Center; 10,603	1-0
2	May 19	Washington	W 99-89	Ogwumike (23)	Parker (8)	Parker (5)	Staples Center; 12,127	2-0
3	May 24	Indiana	L 90-93	Ogwumike (24)	Parker (12)	Parker (6)	Bankers Life Fieldhouse; 5,875	2-1
4	May 27	Atlanta	L 73-75	Gray (25)	Ogwumike (7)	Parker (6)	McCamish Pavilion; 4,253	2-2
5	May 30	New York	W 90-75	Ogwumike (22)	Parker (11)	Gray (6)	Madison Square Garden; 8,108	3-2

June : 8–1 (Home: 4–0; Road: 4–1)

Game	Date	Team	Score	High points	High rebounds	High assists	Location Attendance	Record
6	June 6	Chicago	W 79-70	Ogwumike (20)	Ogwumike (11)	Gray (5)	Staples Center; 8,523	4-2
7	June 9	Dallas	L 90-96	Ogwumike (28)	Ogwumike (13)	Sims (5)	College Park Center; 3,169	4-3
8	June 10	Phoenix	W 89-87	Gray (24)	Tied (5)	Gray (8)	Talking Stick Resort Arena; 10,223	5-3
9	June 13	Dallas	W 97-87	Gray (24)	Parker (7)	Tied (5)	Staples Center; 7,233	6-3
10	June 15	San Antonio	W 80-75	Parker (20)	Ogwumike (9)	Parker (4)	Staples Center; 9,104	7-3
11	June 18	Phoenix	W 90-57	Ogwumike (18)	Parker (8)	Parker (6)	Staples Center; 9,916	8-3
12	June 24	Indiana	W 84-73	Ogwumike (21)	Parker (13)	Parker (7)	Bankers Life Fieldhouse; 9,241	9-3
13	June 27	Connecticut	W 87-79	Ogwumike (21)	Ogwumike (9)	Gray (5)	Mohegan Sun Arena; 6,899	10-3
14	June 30	Atlanta	W 85-76	Parker (21)	Parker (13)	Parker (5)	McCamish Pavilion; 4,119	11-3

July : 6–3 (Home: 5–1; Road: 1–2)

Game	Date	Team	Score	High points	High rebounds	High assists	Location Attendance	Record
15	July 2	Washington	W 76-69	Tied 17	Parker (11)	Parker (4)	Staples Center; 9,185	12-3
16	July 6	Minnesota	L 77-88	Ogwumike (27)	Ogwumike (14)	Ogwumike (5)	Xcel Energy Center; 9,821	12-4
17	July 8	Seattle	L 69-81	Ogwumike (21)	Ogwumike (9)	Gray (6)	KeyArena; 7,104	1125
18	July 13	Connecticut	W 87-77	Ogwumike (29)	Ogwumike (11)	Parker (6)	Staples Center; 9,918	13-5
19	July 17	Indiana	W 80-62	Gray (16)	Ogwumike (12)	Ogwumike (6)	Staples Center; 11,386	14-5
20	July 20	Chicago	L 80-82	Ogwumike (24)	Ogwumike (10)	Gray (6)	Staples Center; 16,166	14-6
21	July 25	Seattle	W 68-60	Parker (17)	Tied (10)	Gray (5)	Staples Center; 10,012	15-6
22	July 28	San Antonio	W 85-73	Sims (22)	Parker (17)	Parker (11)	AT&T Center; 5,777	16-6
23	July 30	Dallas	W 95-74	Parker (23)	Parker (10)	Tied (8)	Staples Center; 11,053	17-6

August : 4–2 (Home: 1–0; Road: 3–2)

Game	Date	Team	Score	High points	High rebounds	High assists	Location Attendance	Record
24	August 4	New York	W 87-84	Parker (24)	Gray (7)	Parker (6)	Staples Center; 11,617	18-6
25	August 6	Dallas	L 79-85	Tied (21)	Parker (9)	Gray (4)	College Park Center; 3,903	18-7
26	August 11	Minnesota	W 70-64	Gray (23)	Parker (10)	Sims (5)	Xcel Energy Center; 11,533	19-7
27	August 13	New York	L 69-83	Sims (18)	Parker (7)	Sims (5)	Madison Square Garden; 10,083	19-8
28	August 16	Washington	W 95-62	Parker (21)	Parker (7)	Sims (7)	Capital One Arena; 7,279	20-8
29	August 18	Chicago	W 115-106	Ogwumike (32)	Parker (12)	Tied (10)	Allstate Arena; 6,826	21-8
30	August 22	San Antonio	W 75-55	Ogwumike (22)	Ogwumike (14)	Parker (6)	Staples Center; 12,433	22-8
31	August 24	Phoenix	W 82-67	Sims (28)	Ogwumike (10)	Sims (8)	Talking Stick Resort Arena; 9,890	23-8
32	August 27	Minnesota	W 78-67	Parker (24)	Parker (10)	Gray (5)	Staples Center; 19,282	24-8

September : 2–0 (Home: 2–0; Road: 0–0)

Game	Date	Team	Score	High points	High rebounds	High assists	Location Attendance	Record
33	September 1	Atlanta	W 81-56	Parker (18)	Ogwumike (6)	Sims (7)	Staples Center; 12,163	25-8
34	September 3	Connecticut	W 81-70	Ogwumike (21)	Parker (14)	Gray (7)	Staples Center; 12,236	26-8

2017 season schedule

=== Playoffs ===
2017 playoff game log
Total: 5–3 (Home: 3–1; Road: 2–2)
WNBA Semifinals: 3–0 (Home: 2–0; Road: 1–0)

Game	Date	Team	Score	High points	High rebounds	High assists	Location Attendance	Series
1	September 12	Phoenix	W 79–66	Ogwumike (19)	Ogwumike (9)	Gray (6)	Staples Center; 7,963	1–0
2	September 14	Phoenix	W 86–72	Parker (24)	Parker (13)	Tied (6)	Walter Pyramid; 4,023	2–0
3	September 17	Phoenix	W 89–87	Sims (22)	Ogwumike (12)	Parker (11)	Talking Stick Resort Arena; 12,043	3–0

WNBA Finals: 2–3 (Home: 1–1; Road: 1–2)

Game	Date	Team	Score	High points	High rebounds	High assists	Location Attendance	Series
1	September 24	Minnesota	W 85–84	Gray (27)	Parker (11)	Gray (6)	Williams Arena; 11,823	1–0
2	September 26	Minnesota	L 68–70	Parker (17)	Ogwumike (13)	Parker (6)	Williams Arena; 11,434	1–1
3	September 29	Minnesota	W 75–64	Tied (16)	Ogwumike (10)	Gray (7)	Staples Center; 13,500	2–1
4	October 1	Minnesota	L 69–80	Ogwumike (17)	Tied (8)	Gray (9)	Staples Center; 13,500	2–2
5	October 4	Minnesota	L 76-85	Parker (19)	Parker (15)	Gray (8)	Williams Arena; 14,632	2-3

2017 playoff schedule

== Standings ==
#	Western Conference	W	L	PCT	GB	Home	Road	Conf.
1	Minnesota Lynx - **(1)**	27	7	.794	–	15–2	12–5	13–3
2	Los Angeles Sparks - **(2)**	26	8	.765	1	16–1	10–7	12–4
3	Phoenix Mercury - **(5)**	18	16	.529	9	9–8	9–8	7–9
4	Dallas Wings - **(7)**	16	18	.471	11	10–7	6–11	7–9
5	Seattle Storm - **(8)**	15	19	.441	12	10–7	5–12	8–8
6	San Antonio Stars - **e**	8	26	.235	19	6–11	2–15	1–15

=== Playoffs ===
**First round** Single elimination (Sept. 6)
5	**Phoenix Mercury**	**79**
8	Seattle Storm	69
6	**Washington Mystics**	**86**
7	Dallas Wings	76

**Second round** Single elimination (Sept. 10)
4	Connecticut Sun	83
5	**Phoenix Mercury**	**88**
3	New York Liberty	68
6	**Washington Mystics**	**82**

**Semifinals**; Best-of-5 (Sept. 12 – Sept. 17)
2	**Los Angeles Sparks**	**3**
5	Phoenix Mercury	0
1	**Minnesota Lynx**	**3**
6	Washington Mystics	0

**WNBA Finals**; Best-of-5 (Sept. 24 – Oct. 4)
1	**Minnesota Lynx**	**3**
2	Los Angeles Sparks	2

Note: Teams re-seeded after second round and semi-finals.

- **Bold** – Game or series winner
- Italic – Team with home-court advantage

== Statistics ==
Legend
GP	Games played	GS	Games started	MPG	Minutes per game	RPG	Rebounds per game
APG	Assists per game	SPG	Steals per game	BPG	Blocks per game	PPG	Points per game
FG%	Field-goal percentage	3P%	3-point field-goal percentage	FT%	Free-throw percentage	TO	Turnovers per game
PF	Fouls per game		Team leader		League leader

=== Regular season ===
Player	GP	GS	MPG	FG%	3P%	FT%	RPG	APG	SPG	BPG	PPG
Nneka Ogwumike	34	34	30.9	56.1%	34.0%	87.0%	7.7	2.1	1.9	0.5	18.8
Candace Parker	33	33	30.5	47.8%	35.4%	75.6%	8.4	4.3	1.5	1.7	16.9
Chelsea Gray	34	34	33.1	50.7%	48.2%	82.7%	3.3	4.4	1.1	0.2	14.8
Odyssey Sims	31	14	24.3	44.7%	19.0%	88.6%	1.9	3.5	1.5	0.2	9.6
Jantel Lavender	32	0	17.3	48.8%	31.3%	84.6%	3.0	0.9	0.3	0.2	7.3
Alana Beard	34	34	30.8	49.7%	31.6%	80.4%	3.3	2.2	2.1	0.5	6.9
Riquna Williams	23	6	17.7	32.1%	27.0%	86.4%	1.4	0.7	0.8	0.1	6.4
Essence Carson	24	14	19.3	40.4%	25.0%	48.5%	1.7	1.2	0.6	0.3	4.8
Sydney Wiese	28	0	7.9	38.3%	40.0%	50.0%	0.8	0.3	0.2	0.1	2.3
Tiffany Jackson	26	1	5.7	46.2%	0.0%	62.5%	1.2	0.1	0.1	0.1	1.1
Sandrine Gruda	7	0	4.0	36.4%	—	—	0.6	0.0	0.0	0.0	1.1
Ify Ibekwe	6	0	3.8	11.1%	0.0%	66.7%	0.8	0.0	0.2	0.0	1.0
Maimouna Diarra	10	0	2.0	20.0%	—	50.0%	1.1	0.1	0.2	0.0	0.3

== Awards and honors ==
Recipient	Award	Date awarded	Ref.
Candace Parker	Player of the Week	June 19, 2017	
Brian Agler	Coach of the Month - June	July 5, 2017	
Candace Parker	Player of the Week	July 31, 2017	
Candace Parker	Player of the Week	August 28, 2017	
Candace Parker	Player of the Month	August 2017	
Alana Beard	WNBA Defensive Player of the Year Award	September 12, 2017	
