= 2017 Seattle Storm season =

- Head coach: Jenny Boucek (fired); Gary Kloppenburg (interim)
- Arena: KeyArena

Results
- Record: 15–19 (.441)
- Place: 5th (Western)
- Playoff finish: First Round v. Phoenix

The 2017 WNBA season was the 18th season for the Seattle Storm of the Women's National Basketball Association. The season began May 13 and ended September 3.

== Transactions ==
=== WNBA draft ===
Round	Pick	Player	Nationality	School/Team/Country
2	15	Alexis Peterson	United States	Syracuse
3	30	Lanay Montgomery	United States	West Virginia

=== Trades ===
- Carolyn Swords was acquired from the New York Liberty.
- Washington Mystics traded its 2017 2nd round draft pick.

== Roster ==
2017 Seattle Storm roster
Players
Coaches

Pos.	No.	Nat.	Name	Height	Weight	DOB	From	Yrs
G	10	(United States)	Bird, Sue	5' 9" (1.75m)	150 lb (68kg)	1980-10-16	Connecticut	15
C	11	(United States)	Montgomery, Lanay	6' 5" (1.96m)	212 lb (96kg)	1993-09-17	West Virginia	R
F	32	(United States)	Clark, Alysha	5' 11" (1.8m)	167 lb (76kg)	1987-07-07	Middle Tennessee	6
F/C	1	(United States)	Langhorne, Crystal	6' 2" (1.88m)	185 lb (84kg)	1986-10-27	Maryland	10
G	24	(United States)	Loyd, Jewell	5' 10" (1.78m)	148 lb (67kg)	1993-10-05	Notre Dame	3
F	23	(United States)	Mosqueda-Lewis, Kaleena	5' 11" (1.8m)	180 lb (82kg)	1993-11-03	Connecticut	3
G	2	(United States)	Peterson, Alexis	5' 7" (1.7m)	139 lb (63kg)	1995-06-20	Syracuse	r
G	45	(United States)	Quinn, Noelle	6' 0" (1.83m)	178 lb (81kg)	1985-01-03	UCLA	11
F/C	30	(United States)	Stewart, Breanna	6' 4" (1.93m)	170 lb (77kg)	1994-08-27	Connecticut	2
C	8	(United States)	Swords, Carolyn	6' 6" (1.98m)	209 lb (95kg)	1989-07-19	Boston College	6
F	7	(Japan)	Tokashiki, Ramu	6' 4" (1.93m)	176 lb (80kg)	1991-06-11	Japan	1
G	3	(United States)	Whitcomb, Sami	5' 10" (1.78m)	145 lb (66kg)	1988-07-20	Washington	R

Head coach
(United States) Jenny Boucek (Virginia)
Assistant coaches
(United States) Gary Kloppenburg (UC San Diego)
(United States) Ryan Webb (Seattle)
Athletic trainer
(United States) Tom Spencer (Central Washington)
Strength and conditioning coach
(United States) Melissa Hardin (Western Washington)

Legend

- (C) Team captain
- (DP) Unsigned draft pick
- (FA) Free agent
- (S) Suspended
- Injured

== Game log ==
=== Preseason ===
2017 pre-season game log
May: 1–1 (Home: 1–0; Road: 0–1)

Game	Date	Team	Score	High points	High rebounds	High assists	Location Attendance	Record
1	May 3	Phoenix	W 86-64	Loyd (14)	Swords (8)	O'Neill (5)	KeyArena; 4,128	1-0
2	May 7	Phoenix	L 55-72	Loyd (13)	Loyd (5)	O'Hea (4)	Talking Stick Resort Arena; 4,088	1-1

2017 pre-season schedule

=== Regular season ===
2017 game log
Total: 15–19 (Home: 10–7; Road: 5–12)
May: 4–1 (Home: 4–0; Road: 0–1)

Game	Date	Team	Score	High points	High rebounds	High assists	Location Attendance	Record
1	May 13	Los Angeles	L 68-78	Loyd (25)	Langhorne (6)	Quinn (8)	Staples Center; 10,603	0-1
2	May 14	Indiana	W 87-82	Loyd (27)	Tied (7)	Tied (3)	KeyArena; 7,969	1-1
3	May 21	Washington	W 81-71	Loyd (26)	Tied (5)	Bird (10)	KeyArena; 6,088	2-1
4	May 26	New York	W 87-81	Stewart (20)	Stewart (12)	Tied (6)	KeyArena; 5,860	3-1
5	May 28	Indiana	W 94-70	Clark (22)	Stewart (9)	Bird (8)	KeyArena; 4,722	4-1

June : 2–7 (Home: 1–3; Road: 1–4)

Game	Date	Team	Score	High points	High rebounds	High assists	Location Attendance	Record
6	June 3	Minnesota	L 77-100	Tied (16)	Stewart (6)	Bird (8)	KeyArena; 7,576	4-2
7	June 6	San Antonio	W 85-76	Stewart (22)	Stewart (8)	Bird (9)	AT&T Center; 4,260	5-2
8	June 9	Indiana	L 80-83	Loyd (25)	Stewart (9)	Bird (6)	Bankers Life Fieldhouse; 6,166	5-3
9	June 11	New York	L 86-94	Stewart (23)	Stewart (10)	Bird (10)	Madison Square Garden; 8,564	5-4
10	June 13	Atlanta	L 86-91	Loyd (27)	Langhorne (10)	Stewart (6)	KeyArena; 4,352	5-5
11	June 18	San Antonio	W 75-57	Stewart (22)	Stewart (15)	Bird (9)	KeyArena; 9,686	6-5
12	June 23	Phoenix	L 82-85	Stewart (21)	Stewart (8)	Bird (8)	KeyArena; 7,796	6-6
13	June 27	Washington	L 70-100	Langhorne (15)	Stewart (7)	Bird (5)	Verizon Center; 7,337	6-7
14	June 29	Connecticut	L 86-96	Stewart (22)	Stewart (10)	Bird (5)	Mohegan Sun Arena; 8,668	6-8

July : 4–5 (Home: 3–3; Road: 1–2)

Game	Date	Team	Score	High points	High rebounds	High assists	Location Attendance	Record
15	July 1	Dallas	W 89-69	Stewart (30)	Stewart (10)	Bird (8)	College Park Center; 4,038	7-8
16	July 6	New York	L 70-79	Stewart (20)	Stewart (14)	Stewart (5)	KeyArena; 4,397	7-9
17	July 8	Los Angeles	W 81-69	Stewart (26)	Tied (7)	Tied (4)	KeyArena; 7,104	8-9
18	July 12	Connecticut	L 79-83	Stewart (22)	Stewart (8)	Bird (7)	KeyArena; 10,833	8-10
19	July 15	Atlanta	W 90-84	Stewart (24)	Stewart (9)	Bird (7)	KeyArena; 6,993	9-10
20	July 18	Chicago	L 83-94	Stewart (25)	Stewart (11)	Bird (9)	KeyArena; 8,358	9-11
21	July 25	Los Angeles	L 60-68	Stewart (23)	Langhorne (10)	Tied (5)	Staples Center; 10,012	9-12
22	July 28	Dallas	W 109-93	Loyd (27)	Stewart (9)	Bird (6)	KeyArena; 7,797	10-12
23	July 30	Minnesota	L 82-93	Loyd (26)	Langhorne (10)	Tied (6)	Xcel Energy Center; 12,432	10-13

August : 4–4 (Home: 2–0; Road: 2–4)

Game	Date	Team	Score	High points	High rebounds	High assists	Location Attendance	Record
24	August 4	Dallas	L 80-93	Loyd (23)	Tied (5)	Bird (7)	College Park Center; 3,712	10-14
25	August 5	San Antonio	L 80-87 (OT)	Stewart (32)	Tied (8)	Loyd (7)	AT&T Center; 5,869	10-15
26	August 8	Connecticut	L 71-84	Stewart (17)	Clark (10)	Bird (4)	Mohegan Sun Arena; 7,853	10-16
27	August 12	Phoenix	W 98-89	Tied (20)	Stewart (9)	Tied (5)	Talking Stick Resort Arena; 11,797	11-16
28	August 16	Minnesota	W 62-61	Loyd (16)	Stewart (11)	Quinn (5)	KeyArena; 7,876	12-16
29	August 18	San Antonio	W 79-78	Stewart (22)	Stewart (9)	Bird (6)	KeyArena; 9,686	13-16
30	August 20	Chicago	W 103-66	Stewart (19)	Stewart (9)	Bird (8)	Allstate Arena; 6,020	14-16
31	August 23	Atlanta	L 83-89	Stewart (18)	Langhorne (10)	Bird (6)	McCamish Pavilion	14-17
32	August 27	Phoenix	L 71-75	Loyd (33)	Stewart (9)	Stewart (4)	KeyArena; 13,882	14-18

September : 1–1 (Home: 0–0; Road: 1–1)

Game	Date	Team	Score	High points	High rebounds	High assists	Location Attendance	Record
33	September 1	Washington	L 106-110	Clark (20)	Stewart (13)	Bird (6)	Capital One Arena; 11,567	14-19
34	September 3	Chicago	W 85-80	Stewart (29)	Langhorne (12)	Quinn (7)	Allstate Arena; 7,199	15-19

2017 season schedule

=== Playoffs ===
2017 playoff game log
WNBA First Round: 0–1 (Home: 0–0; Road: 0–1)

Game	Date	Team	Score	High points	High rebounds	High assists	Location Attendance	Series
1	September 6	Phoenix	L 69-79	Stewart (23)	Stewart (8)	Bird (5)	Wells Fargo Arena; 5,764	0-1

2017 playoff schedule

== Statistics ==
Legend
GP	Games played	GS	Games started	MPG	Minutes per game	RPG	Rebounds per game
APG	Assists per game	SPG	Steals per game	BPG	Blocks per game	PPG	Points per game
FG%	Field-goal percentage	3P%	3-point field-goal percentage	FT%	Free-throw percentage	TO	Turnovers per game
PF	Fouls per game		Team leader		League leader

=== Regular season ===
Player	GP	GS	MPG	FG%	3P%	FT%	RPG	APG	SPG	BPG	PPG
Breanna Stewart	33	33	32.9	47.5%	37.1%	78.7%	8.7	2.7	1.2	1.6	19.9
Jewell Loyd	34	34	31.1	43.1%	38.6%	86.3%	3.2	3.4	1.3	0.4	17.7
Crystal Langhorne	34	34	28.4	64.7%	50.0%	73.5%	6.1	1.5	0.6	0.4	12.4
Sue Bird	30	30	30.0	42.7%	39.3%	77.4%	2.0	6.6	1.2	0.1	10.6
Alysha Clark	33	33	28.3	52.5%	32.8%	74.5%	4.2	1.6	0.7	0.1	8.2
Kaleena Mosqueda-Lewis	18	1	11.1	45.6%	29.4%	100%	1.2	0.5	0.2	0.1	4.6
Sami Whitcomb	33	0	12.2	36.1%	33.3%	81.0%	1.7	1.0	0.7	0.0	4.5
Ramu Tokashiki	33	1	12.5	44.2%	0.0%	81.5%	1.6	0.6	0.3	0.3	3.2
Noelle Quinn	32	4	15.8	40.3%	38.5%	95.2%	1.6	2.8	0.4	0.2	2.7
Carolyn Swords	30	0	8.7	54.5%	—	77.3%	1.5	0.3	0.2	0.2	2.6
Alexis Peterson	17	0	7.1	29.5%	25.0%	100%	1.2	0.8	0.3	0.0	2.1
Lanay Montgomery	7	0	4.0	42.9%	—	—	0.7	0.0	0.1	0.6	0.9

== Awards and honors ==
Recipient	Award	Date awarded	Ref.
Breanna Stewart	Player of the Week	July 17, 2017	
Breanna Stewart	Player of the Week	August 21, 2017	

== Standings ==
#	Western Conference	W	L	PCT	GB	Home	Road	Conf.
1	Minnesota Lynx - **(1)**	27	7	.794	–	15–2	12–5	13–3
2	Los Angeles Sparks - **(2)**	26	8	.765	1	16–1	10–7	12–4
3	Phoenix Mercury - **(5)**	18	16	.529	9	9–8	9–8	7–9
4	Dallas Wings - **(7)**	16	18	.471	11	10–7	6–11	7–9
5	Seattle Storm - **(8)**	15	19	.441	12	10–7	5–12	8–8
6	San Antonio Stars - **e**	8	26	.235	19	6–11	2–15	1–15

=== Playoffs ===
**First round** Single elimination (Sept. 6)
5	**Phoenix Mercury**	**79**
8	Seattle Storm	69
6	**Washington Mystics**	**86**
7	Dallas Wings	76

**Second round** Single elimination (Sept. 10)
4	Connecticut Sun	83
5	**Phoenix Mercury**	**88**
3	New York Liberty	68
6	**Washington Mystics**	**82**

**Semifinals**; Best-of-5 (Sept. 12 – Sept. 17)
2	**Los Angeles Sparks**	**3**
5	Phoenix Mercury	0
1	**Minnesota Lynx**	**3**
6	Washington Mystics	0

**WNBA Finals**; Best-of-5 (Sept. 24 – Oct. 4)
1	**Minnesota Lynx**	**3**
2	Los Angeles Sparks	2

Note: Teams re-seeded after second round and semi-finals.

- **Bold** – Game or series winner
- Italic – Team with home-court advantage
