= 2017 Phoenix Mercury season =

- Head coach: Sandy Brondello
- Arena: Talking Stick Resort Arena

Results
- Record: 18–16 (.529)
- Place: 3rd (Western)
- Playoff finish: Lost in Semifinals to Los Angeles

Media
- Television: FS Arizona (FS-A)

The 2017 WNBA season was the 21st season for the Phoenix Mercury franchise of the WNBA. The season began on May 14.

== Transactions ==
=== WNBA draft ===
Round	Pick	Player	Nationality	School/Team/Country
3	29	Alexis Prince	United States	Baylor

== Roster ==
2017 Phoenix Mercury roster
Players
Coaches

Pos.	No.	Nat.	Name	Height	Weight	DOB	From	Yrs
C	23	(Australia)	George, Cayla	6' 4" (1.93m)	192 lb (87kg)	1987-04-20	Australia	1
F/C	0	(United States)	Robinson, Angel	6' 6" (1.98m)	193 lb (88kg)	1987-04-20	Georgia	1
C	42	(United States)	Griner, Brittney	6' 9" (2.06m)	205 lb (93kg)	1990-10-18	Baylor	5
F	20	(United States)	Little, Camille	6' 2" (1.88m)	180 lb (82kg)	1985-01-18	North Carolina	11
G	11	(United States)	Robinson, Danielle	5' 9" (1.75m)	125 lb (57kg)	1989-05-10	Oklahoma	7
G	5	(United States)	Mitchell, Leilani	5' 5" (1.65m)	128 lb (58kg)	1985-06-15	Utah	9
G	3	(United States)	Taurasi, Diana	6' 0" (1.83m)	163 lb (74kg)	1982-06-11	Connecticut	13
G	8	(Australia)	Talbot, Stephanie	6' 1" (1.85m)	191 lb (87kg)	1990-12-20	Australia	R
G	6	(United States)	Turner, Yvonne	5' 9" (1.75m)	131 lb (59kg)	1987-10-13	Nebraska	2
F	10	(United States)	Cannon, Emma	6' 2" (1.88m)	190 lb (86kg)	1989-06-01	Central Florida	R
G/F	25	(United States)	Currie, Monique	6' 0" (1.83m)	176 lb (80kg)	1983-02-25	Duke	11

Head coach
(Australia) Sandy Brondello (Western Sydney)
Assistant coaches
(United States) Julie Hairgrove (Arizona)
(United States) Todd Troxel (Doane)
Athletic trainer
(United States) Tamara Poole (Cal State Dominguez Hills)
Strength and conditioning coach
(United States) Kristine Foltz (Iowa State)

Legend

- (C) Team captain
- (DP) Unsigned draft pick
- (FA) Free agent
- (S) Suspended
- Injured

== Game log ==
=== Preseason ===
2017 pre-season game log
May: 1–1 (Home: 1–0; Road: 0–1)

Game	Date	Team	Score	High points	High rebounds	High assists	Location Attendance	Record
1	May 3	Seattle	L 64–86	Prince (12)	Cannon (6)	Spencer (5)	KeyArena; 4,128	0–1
2	May 7	Seattle	W 72–55	2 Tied (16)	George (6)	Mitchell (5)	Talking Stick Resort Arena; 4,088	1–1

2017 pre-season schedule

=== Regular season ===
2017 game log
Total: 18–16 (Home: 9–8; Road: 9–8)
May: 3–2 (Home: 2–2; Road: 1–0)

Game	Date	Team	Score	High points	High rebounds	High assists	Location Attendance	Record
1	May 14	Dallas	L 58–68	Griner (18)	2 Tied (5)	D. Robinson (9)	Talking Stick Resort Arena; 9,640	0–1
2	May 17	Indiana	W 85–62	Griner (32)	Griner (10)	Mitchell (7)	Talking Stick Resort Arena; 8,896	1–1
3	May 19	San Antonio	W 78–72	Griner (20)	Griner (13)	D. Robinson (5)	AT&T Center; 6,400	2–1
4	May 23	New York	L 67–69	Griner (19)	Griner (6)	2 Tied (5)	Talking Stick Resort Arena; 7,886	2–2
5	May 27	Dallas	W 107–65	Taurasi (18)	Cannon (8)	D. Robinson (7)	Talking Stick Resort Arena; 9,245	3–2

June : 4–4 (Home: 1–2; Road: 3–2)

Game	Date	Team	Score	High points	High rebounds	High assists	Location Attendance	Record
6	June 1	Chicago	W 99–91	Taurasi (37)	Griner (13)	D. Robinson (6)	Allstate Arena; 4,634	4–2
7	June 4	New York	L 72–88	Griner (26)	George (5)	Griner (4)	Madison Square Garden; 7,831	4–3
8	June 7	Indiana	W 98–90	Griner (38)	Griner (9)	Mitchell (7)	Bankers Life Fieldhouse; 5,702	5–3
9	June 10	Los Angeles	L 87–89	Taurasi (27)	Griner (9)	Griner (5)	Talking Stick Resort Arena; 10,223	5–4
10	June 16	Chicago	W 86–78	Griner (27)	Griner (9)	Taurasi (5)	Talking Stick Resort Arena; 10,249	6–4
11	June 18	Los Angeles	L 59–90	Taurasi (19)	Mitchell (7)	Mitchell (5)	Staples Center; 9,916	6–5
12	June 23	Seattle	W 85–82	2 Tied (25)	Griner (9)	Taurasi (4)	KeyArena; 7,796	7–5
13	June 30	Minnesota	L 83–91	Little (16)	A. Robinson (8)	D. Robinson (3)	Talking Stick Resort Arena; 11,330	7–6

July : 6–4 (Home: 4–2; Road: 2–2)

Game	Date	Team	Score	High points	High rebounds	High assists	Location Attendance	Record
14	July 5	Washington	W 88–80	Griner (30)	Griner (14)	Taurasi (4)	Talking Stick Resort Arena; 7,440	8–6
15	July 7	San Antonio	W 92–77	Taurasi (17)	Griner (8)	3 Tied (5)	AT&T Center; 8,232	9–6
16	July 9	New York	W 81–69	Griner (31)	Griner (13)	D. Robinson (6)	Talking Stick Resort Arena; 9,413	10–6
17	July 12	Atlanta	W 89–84	Griner (28)	Little (12)	Little (6)	Talking Stick Resort Arena; 9,342	11–6
18	July 14	Minnesota	L 71–88	Griner (15)	Mitchell (5)	Talbot (4)	Talking Stick Resort Arena; 10,493	11–7
19	July 16	Minnesota	L 66–81	Turner (18)	3 Tied (6)	Mitchell (4)	Xcel Energy Center; 10,022	11–8
20	July 19	Indiana	L 77–84	Taurasi (34)	A. Robinson (8)	Little (5)	Talking Stick Resort Arena; 11,371	11–9
21	July 25	Atlanta	L 91–99	Taurasi (31)	A. Robinson (9)	D. Robinson (8)	McCamish Pavilion; 4,053	11–10
22	July 28	Chicago	W 86–80	Little (19)	George (14)	Mitchell (5)	Allstate Arena; 6,088	12–10
23	July 30	San Antonio	W 81–64	Currie (20)	2 Tied (6)	D. Robinson (4)	Talking Stick Resort Arena; 10,108	13–10

August : 3–6 (Home: 0–2; Road: 3–4)

Game	Date	Team	Score	High points	High rebounds	High assists	Location Attendance	Record
24	August 4	Connecticut	L 92–93	Taurasi (33)	3 Tied (5)	Mitchell (8)	Mohegan Sun Arena; 7,331	13–11
25	August 6	Washington	L80–85	Taurasi (16)	Currie (8)	2 Tied (5)	Verizon Center; 7,414	13–12
26	August 10	Dallas	W 101–100	Currie (29)	Cannon (9)	2 Tied (7)	College Park Center; 4,165	14–12
27	August 12	Seattle	L 89–98	Taurasi (20)	Cannon (9)	Taurasi (4)	Talking Stick Resort Arena; 11,797	14–13
28	August 18	Washington	W 89–79	Taurasi (25)	Griner (10)	3 Tied (4)	Capital One Arena; 7,208	15–13
29	August 20	Connecticut	L 66–94	Griner (18)	Griner (6)	Mitchell (3)	Mohegan Sun Arena; 8,353	15–14
30	August 22	Minnesota	L 69–105	Currie (14)	Little (5)	Turner (4)	Xcel Energy Center; 10,723	15–15
31	August 24	Los Angeles	L 67–82	Griner (18)	Griner (6)	Mitchell (6)	Talking Stick Resort Arena; 9,890	15–16
32	August 27	Seattle	W 75–71	Griner (29)	2 Tied (8)	Currie (7)	Key Arena; 13,882	16–16

September : 2–0 (Home: 2–0; Road: 0–0)

Game	Date	Team	Score	High points	High rebounds	High assists	Location Attendance	Record
33	September 1	Connecticut	W 86–66	Griner (31)	2 Tied (8)	Griner (5)	Talking Stick Resort Arena; 9,971	17–16
34	September 3	Atlanta	W 84–70	Griner (30)	Cannon (10)	3 Tied (3)	Talking Stick Resort Arena; 11,222	18–16

2017 season schedule

=== Playoffs ===
2017 playoff game log
Total: 2–3(Home: 1–1; Road: 1–2)
First Round: 1–0 (Home: 1–0; Road: 0–0)

Game	Date	Team	Score	High points	High rebounds	High assists	Location Attendance	Series
1	September 6	Seattle	W 79–69	Griner (23)	Griner (11)	3 Tied (3)	Wells Fargo Arena; 5,764	1–0

Second Round: 1–0 (Home: 0–0; Road: 1–0)

Game	Date	Team	Score	High points	High rebounds	High assists	Location Attendance	Series
1	September 10	Connecticut	W 88–83	Griner (26)	Griner (9)	Mitchell (5)	Mohegan Sun Arena; 8,420	1–0

WNBA Semifinals: 0–3 (Home: 0–1; Road: 0–2)

Game	Date	Team	Score	High points	High rebounds	High assists	Location Attendance	Series
1	September 12	Los Angeles	L 66–79	Mitchell (19)	Little (11)	Mitchell (4)	Staples Center; 7,963	0–1
2	September 14	Los Angeles	L 72–86	Taurasi (32)	Mitchell (6)	Taurasi (4)	Walter Pyramid; 4,023	0–2
3	September 17	Los Angeles	L 87–89	Taurasi (22)	2 Tied (8)	2 Tied (5)	Talking Stick Resort Arena; 12,043	0–3

2017 playoff schedule

== Standings ==
#	Western Conference	W	L	PCT	GB	Home	Road	Conf.
1	Minnesota Lynx - **(1)**	27	7	.794	–	15–2	12–5	13–3
2	Los Angeles Sparks - **(2)**	26	8	.765	1	16–1	10–7	12–4
3	Phoenix Mercury - **(5)**	18	16	.529	9	9–8	9–8	7–9
4	Dallas Wings - **(7)**	16	18	.471	11	10–7	6–11	7–9
5	Seattle Storm - **(8)**	15	19	.441	12	10–7	5–12	8–8
6	San Antonio Stars - **e**	8	26	.235	19	6–11	2–15	1–15

=== Playoffs ===
**First round** Single elimination (Sept. 6)
5	**Phoenix Mercury**	**79**
8	Seattle Storm	69
6	**Washington Mystics**	**86**
7	Dallas Wings	76

**Second round** Single elimination (Sept. 10)
4	Connecticut Sun	83
5	**Phoenix Mercury**	**88**
3	New York Liberty	68
6	**Washington Mystics**	**82**

**Semifinals**; Best-of-5 (Sept. 12 – Sept. 17)
2	**Los Angeles Sparks**	**3**
5	Phoenix Mercury	0
1	**Minnesota Lynx**	**3**
6	Washington Mystics	0

**WNBA Finals**; Best-of-5 (Sept. 24 – Oct. 4)
1	**Minnesota Lynx**	**3**
2	Los Angeles Sparks	2

Note: Teams re-seeded after second round and semi-finals.

- **Bold** – Game or series winner
- Italic – Team with home-court advantage

== Awards and honors ==
Recipient	Award	Date awarded	Ref.
Diana Taurasi	Player of the Week	June 4, 2017	
Brittney Griner	Player of the Week	July 10, 2017	
Brittney Griner	Player of the Week	September 5, 2017	

== Statistics ==
Legend
GP	Games played	GS	Games started	MPG	Minutes per game	RPG	Rebounds per game
APG	Assists per game	SPG	Steals per game	BPG	Blocks per game	PPG	Points per game
FG%	Field-goal percentage	3P%	3-point field-goal percentage	FT%	Free-throw percentage	TO	Turnovers per game
PF	Fouls per game		Team leader		League leader

=== Regular season ===
Player	GP	GS	MPG	FG%	3P%	FT%	RPG	APG	SPG	BPG	PPG
Brittney Griner	26	26	31.5	57.7%	—	81.2%	7.6	1.9	0.7	2.5	21.9
Diana Taurasi	31	31	28.5	40.0%	38.4%	91.2%	3.0	2.7	0.5	0.3	17.9
Monique Currie	22	7	20.9	42.4%	42.4%	82.4%	3.0	2.2	0.8	0.3	10.2
Leilani Mitchell	34	7	21.4	38.9%	36.0%	82.4%	2.4	3.6	0.9	0.3	8.0
Camille Little	34	34	25.4	41.9%	22.4%	60.7%	3.8	1.4	0.9	0.4	7.1
Danielle Robinson	32	29	23.5	43.2%	0.0%	84.6%	2.9	3.4	1.1	0.2	6.9
Yvonne Turner	34	4	12.8	41.0%	24.1%	76.3%	1.0	1.1	0.6	0.0	5.1
Stephanie Talbot	34	24	17.9	41.5%	38.1%	65.2%	2.7	1.6	0.7	0.3	4.4
Emma Cannon	34	0	12.9	49.1%	0.0%	58.7%	3.6	0.3	0.1	0.1	4.4
Angel Robinson	15	8	15.8	56.8%	100%	100%	3.9	0.5	0.1	0.7	3.9
Cayla George	32	0	11.9	37.6%	28.3%	64.3%	2.7	0.5	0.3	0.4	3.3
Shay Murphy	9	0	14.1	33.3%	18.8%	66.7%	2.4	0.8	0.7	0.0	3.2
Alexis Prince	18	0	7.2	34.1%	31.3%	100%	1.0	0.4	0.2	0.2	1.9
Sophie Brunner	3	0	4.3	0.0%	—	—	1.3	0.0	0.0	0.0	0.0
