= 2017 Washington Mystics season =

- Head coach: Mike Thibault
- Arena: Verizon Center

Results
- Record: 18–16 (.529)
- Place: 3rd (Eastern)
- Playoff finish: Semifinals v. Minnesota

Media
- Television: CSN Mid-Atlantic (CSN-MA)

The 2017 WNBA season for the Washington Mystics of the Women's National Basketball Association is scheduled to begin May 13, 2017. The Mystics got off to a strong start, posting a 10–5 record in May and June. After a 4–4 July, the Mystics struggled to finish out the season. A 4–6 finish saw them place third in the Eastern Conference, and earn the 6th overall seed in the playoffs. Strong performances from star players allowed the Mystics to win in the First Round over the Dallas Wings and in the Second Round over the New York Liberty. In the Semifinals, the Mystics were swept by the Minnesota Lynx 0–3.

The Mystics became the first Washington-based professional sports team to reach the semifinal stage of playoffs since they themselves did so in 2002. They and the NHL's Washington Capitals reaching the Finals in 1998 were the only instances of a Washington-based team reaching the semifinals since the Redskins' 1991 Super Bowl.

== Transactions ==
=== WNBA draft ===
Round	Pick	Player	Nationality	School/Team/Country
1	6	Shatori Walker-Kimbrough	United States	Maryland
2	18	Jennie Simms	United States	Old Dominion
3	27	Mehryn Kraker	United States	Green Bay

=== Trades ===
- Elena Delle Donne is acquired from the Chicago Sky in exchange for Stefanie Dolson, Kahleah Copper and Washington’s first-round pick (second overall) in the 2017 WNBA draft.
- Bria Hartley and Kia Vaughn were traded to the New York Liberty.
- The 2nd round draft pick (15th overall) was traded to the Seattle Storm.

== Roster ==
2017 Washington Mystics roster
Players
Coaches

Pos.	No.	Nat.	Name	Height	Weight	DOB	From	Yrs
G	15	(United States)	Cloud, Natasha	6' 0" (1.83m)	160 lb (73kg)	1992-02-22	Saint Joseph's	3
G/F	11	(United States)	Delle Donne, Elena (injured)	6' 5" (1.96m)	188 lb (85kg)	1989-09-05	Delaware	5
G	4	(United States)	Hill, Tayler	5' 9" (1.75m)	145 lb (66kg)	1990-10-23	Ohio State	5
G	20	(United States)	Toliver, Kristi	5' 7" (1.7m)	130 lb (59kg)	1987-01-27	Maryland	9
G	12	(United States)	Latta, Ivory	5' 6" (1.68m)	138 lb (63kg)	1984-09-25	North Carolina	12
C	33	(Belgium)	Meesseman, Emma	6' 4" (1.93m)	182 lb (83kg)	1993-05-13	Belgium	5
G	14	(United States)	Ruffin-Pratt, Tierra	5' 10" (1.78m)	183 lb (83kg)	1991-04-11	North Carolina	5
G	23	(United States)	Hightower, Allison	5' 10" (1.78m)	170 lb (77kg)	1988-04-06	LSU	5
F	31	(United States)	Taylor, Asia	6' 1" (1.85m)	167 lb (76kg)	1991-08-22	Louisville	3
C	34	(United States)	Thomas, Krystal	6' 5" (1.96m)	195 lb (88kg)	1989-06-10	Duke	6
F	21	(United States)	Hawkins, Tianna	6' 3" (1.91m)	191 lb (87kg)	1991-03-02	Maryland	4
G	32	(United States)	Walker-Kimbrough, Shatori	5' 11" (1.8m)	140 lb (64kg)	1995-05-18	Maryland	R

Head coach
(United States) Mike Thibault (Saint Martin's)
Assistant coaches
(United States) Marianne Stanley (Immaculata)
(United States) Eric Thibault (Missouri)
Athletic trainer
(United States) Emily Fortunato (George Washington)
Strength and conditioning coach
(United States) Michael Bugielski (Illinois State)

Legend

- (C) Team captain
- (DP) Unsigned draft pick
- (FA) Free agent
- (S) Suspended
- Injured

== Game log ==
=== Preseason ===
2017 pre-season game log
May: 1–1 (Home: 0–1; Road: 1–0)

Game	Date	Team	Score	High points	High rebounds	High assists	Location Attendance	Record
1	May 2	Indiana	W 87-67	Taylor (13)	Hawkins (7)	Tied (3)	Indiana Farmers Coliseum; 4,336	1-0
2	May 8	Minnesota	L 59-75	Hawkins (14)	Hawkins (7)	Latta (4)	Verizon Center; 1,426	1-1

2017 pre-season schedule

=== Regular season ===
2017 game log
Total: 18–16 (Home: 11–6; Road: 7–10)
May: 4–2 (Home: 3–0; Road: 1–2)

Game	Date	Team	Score	High points	High rebounds	High assists	Location Attendance	Record
1	May 14	San Antonio	W 89-74	Dell Donne (24)	Ruffin-Pratt (9)	Meesseman (8)	Verizon Center; 6,126	1-0
2	May 19	Los Angeles	L 89-99	Dell Donne (27)	Tied (4)	Cloud (8)	Staples Center; 12,127	1-1
3	May 21	Seattle	L 71-81	Dell Donne (14)	Ruffin-Pratt (8)	Toliver (3)	KeyArena; 6,088	1-2
4	May 24	Chicago	W 82-67	Dell Donne (21)	Ruffin-Pratt (10)	Toliver (5)	Allstate Arena; 6,714	2-2
5	May 26	Chicago	W 88-79	Dell Donne (20)	Thomas (10)	Tied (5)	Verizon Center; 6,438	3-2
6	May 31	Connecticut	W 78-76	Hill (18)	Dell Donne (12)	Hill (8)	Verizon Center; 5,393	4-2

June : 6–3 (Home: 3–2; Road: 3–1)

Game	Date	Team	Score	High points	High rebounds	High assists	Location Attendance	Record
7	June 4	Atlanta	W 78-72	Dell Donne (23)	Dell Donne (15)	Tied (4)	Verizon Center; 5,320	5-2
8	June 6	Dallas	W 101-89	Dell Donne (23)	Tied (8)	Cloud (6)	College Park Center; 2,805	6-2
9	June 9	Minnesota	L 73-98	Hill (20)	Taylor (7)	Tied (2)	Verizon Center; 6,518	6-3
10	June 11	Indiana	W 88-70	Dell Donne (25)	Thomas (14)	Toliver (4)	Verizon Center; 6,194	7-3
11	June 18	Dallas	L 83-87	Hill (21)	Hawkins (7)	Tied (4)	Verizon Center; 7,285	7-4
12	June 23	Minnesota	L 76-93	Hill (21)	Dell Donne (8)	Tied (1)	Xcel Energy Center; 9,723	7-5
13	June 25	Chicago	W 97-63	Hill (17)	Thomas (12)	Cloud (6)	Allstate Arena; 5,344	8-5
14	June 27	Seattle	W 100-70	Dell Donne (25)	Tied (12)	Tied (4)	Verizon Center; 7,337	9-5
15	June 29	New York	W 67-54	Tied (15)	Dell Donne (9)	Hill (3)	Verizon Center; 5,490	10-5

July : 4–4 (Home: 1–0; Road: 3–4)

Game	Date	Team	Score	High points	High rebounds	High assists	Location Attendance	Record
16	July 2	Los Angeles	L 69-76	Dell Donne (22)	Thomas (7)	Hill (3)	Staples Center; 9,185	10-6
17	July 5	Phoenix	L 80-88	Dell Donne (15)	Thomas (10)	Tied (3)	Talking Stick Resort Arena; 7,440	10-7
18	July 8	Connecticut	L 92-96	Dell Donne (28)	Tied (6)	Toliver (7)	Mohegan Sun Arena; 6,073	10-8
19	July 14	Indiana	W 72-58	Meesseman (15)	Ruffin-Pratt (11)	Meesseman (3)	Bankers Life Fieldhouse; 8,007	11-8
20	July 16	New York	L 55-85	Meesseman (19)	Thomas (10)	Tied (2)	Madison Square Garden; 10,204	11-9
21	July 19	Atlanta	W 100-96	Toliver (29)	Thomas (17)	Cloud (8)	Verizon Center; 15,597	12-9
22	July 25	San Antonio	W 85-76	Dell Donne (29)	Thomas (13)	Toliver (10)	AT&T Center; 9,244	13-9
23	July 30	Atlanta	W 77-70	Meesseman (30)	Thomas (15)	Tied (3)	McCamish Pavilion; 4,185	14-9

August : 3–5 (Home: 2–3; Road: 1–2)

Game	Date	Team	Score	High points	High rebounds	High assists	Location Attendance	Record
24	August 4	San Antonio	L 74-76	Toliver (18)	Thomas (20)	Tied (6)	AT&T Center; 4,955	14-10
25	August 6	Phoenix	W 85-80	Toliver (20)	Thomas (16)	Tied (3)	Verizon Center; 7,414	15-10
26	August 12	Indiana	W 100-80	Thomas (20)	Thomas (14)	Meesseman (7)	Capital One Arena; 7,337	16-10
27	August 16	Los Angeles	L 62-95	Meesseman (20)	Meesseman (7)	Tied (3)	Capital One Arena; 7,279	16-11
28	August 18	Phoenix	L 79-89	Toliver (21)	Tied (8)	Toliver (4)	Capital One Arena; 7,208	16-12
29	August 20	Indiana	W 87-82	Tied (18)	Thomas (11)	Ruffin-Pratt (4)	Bankers Life Fieldhouse; 7,593	17-12
30	August 25	New York	L 66-74	Thomas (17)	Thomas (9)	Dell Donne (4)	Madison Square Garden; 9,340	17-13
31	August 26	Dallas	L 78-83	Dell Donne (29)	Dell Donne (11)	Toliver (5)	Capital One Arena; 8,656	17-14
32	August 29	Connecticut	L 76-86	Dell Donne (24)	Dell Donne (16)	Toliver (6)	Capital One Arena; 10,953	17-15

September : 1–1 (Home: 1–0; Road: 0–1)

Game	Date	Team	Score	High points	High rebounds	High assists	Location Attendance	Record
33	September 1	Seattle	W 110-106	Dell Donne (37)	Thomas (12)	Toliver (8)	Capital One Arena; 11,567	18-15
34	September 3	Minnesota	L 72-86	Toliver (20)	Thomas (14)	Toliver (3)	Xcel Energy Center; 10,321	18-17

2017 season schedule

=== Playoffs ===
2017 playoff game log
Total: 2–3(Home: 1–1; Road: 1–2)
First Round: 1–0 (Home: 1–0; Road: 0–0)

Game	Date	Team	Score	High points	High rebounds	High assists	Location Attendance	Series
1	September 6	Dallas	W 86–76	Dell Donne (25)	Thomas (17)	Meesseman (5)	Capital One Arena; 6,483	1–0

Second Round: 1–0 (Home: 0–0; Road: 1–0)

Game	Date	Team	Score	High points	High rebounds	High assists	Location Attendance	Series
1	September 10	New York Liberty	W 82–68	Toliver (32)	Dell Donne (10)	Tied (4)	Madison Square Garden; 9,538	1–0

WNBA Semifinals: 0–3 (Home: 0–1; Road: 0–2)

Game	Date	Team	Score	High points	High rebounds	High assists	Location Attendance	Series
1	September 12	Minnesota	L 81–101	Dell Donne (17)	Dell Donne (6)	Toliver (6)	Williams Arena; 7,834	0–1
2	September 14	Minnesota	L 83–93	Tied (25)	Thomas (7)	Toliver (6)	Williams Arena; 9,033	0–2
3	September 17	Minnesota	L 70–81	Dell Donne (15)	Dell Donne (8)	Toliver (5)	Capital One Arena; 7,950	0–3

2017 playoff schedule

== Standings ==
#	Eastern Conference	W	L	PCT	GB	Home	Road	Conf.
1	New York Liberty - **(3)**	22	12	.647	-	13–4	9–8	10–6
2	Connecticut Sun - **(4)**	21	13	.636	1	12–5	9–6	10–6
3	Washington Mystics - **(6)**	18	16	.529	4	11–6	7–10	12-4
4	Chicago Sky - **e**	12	22	.353	10	4–13	8–9	6–10
5	Atlanta Dream - **e**	12	22	.353	10	9–8	3–14	5–11
6	Indiana Fever - **e**	9	25	.265	13	6–11	3–14	4–12

=== Playoffs ===
**First round** Single elimination (Sept. 6)
5	**Phoenix Mercury**	**79**
8	Seattle Storm	69
6	**Washington Mystics**	**86**
7	Dallas Wings	76

**Second round** Single elimination (Sept. 10)
4	Connecticut Sun	83
5	**Phoenix Mercury**	**88**
3	New York Liberty	68
6	**Washington Mystics**	**82**

**Semifinals**; Best-of-5 (Sept. 12 – Sept. 17)
2	**Los Angeles Sparks**	**3**
5	Phoenix Mercury	0
1	**Minnesota Lynx**	**3**
6	Washington Mystics	0

**WNBA Finals**; Best-of-5 (Sept. 24 – Oct. 4)
1	**Minnesota Lynx**	**3**
2	Los Angeles Sparks	2

Note: Teams re-seeded after second round and semi-finals.

- **Bold** – Game or series winner
- Italic – Team with home-court advantage

== Statistics ==
Legend
GP	Games played	GS	Games started	MPG	Minutes per game	RPG	Rebounds per game
APG	Assists per game	SPG	Steals per game	BPG	Blocks per game	PPG	Points per game
FG%	Field-goal percentage	3P%	3-point field-goal percentage	FT%	Free-throw percentage	TO	Turnovers per game
PF	Fouls per game		Team leader		League leader

=== Regular season ===
Player	GP	GS	MPG	FG%	3P%	FT%	RPG	APG	SPG	BPG	PPG
Elena Delle Donne	25	25	30.3	49.4%	38.8%	95.3%	6.8	1.6	0.8	1.4	19.7
Emma Meesseman	23	21	28.4	48.2%	31.8%	87.0%	5.7	2.8	1.0	1.5	14.1
Tayler Hill	18	16	25.7	36.1%	30.3%	93.8%	1.9	2.6	0.9	0.1	13.3
Kristi Toliver	34	34	29.1	40.7%	33.8%	86.7%	2.0	3.4	0.7	0.2	11.9
Ivory Latta	34	1	17.0	34.9%	32.8%	87.1%	0.8	1.7	0.4	0.0	8.0
Tierra Ruffin-Pratt	34	34	24.3	33.7%	0.0%	73.8%	5.3	2.3	1.0	0.5	7.3
Krystal Thomas	34	30	26.1	54.4%	—	60.3%	9.6	1.0	0.5	1.1	7.0
Tianna Hawkins	33	1	16.6	47.1%	26.1%	95.3%	4.2	0.3	0.5	0.2	6.9
Allison Hightower	11	0	13.2	36.2%	20.0%	87.5%	1.3	1.1	0.7	0.0	4.7
Natasha Cloud	24	0	18.7	31.4%	23.5%	74.1%	2.5	2.9	0.7	0.1	4.4
Shatori Walker-Kimbrough	27	8	12.4	37.1%	33.3%	85.4%	1.1	0.4	0.6	0.1	4.4
Asia Taylor	24	0	6.7	32.5%	0.0%	73.1%	1.8	0.4	0.3	0.1	1.9
Jennie Simms	10	0	5.0	16.7%	0.0%	80.0%	1.1	0.6	0.2	0.2	1.2
Haley Peters	2	0	0.0%	0.0%	—	0.5	0.0	0.0	0.0	0.0	0.0

== Awards and honors ==
Recipient	Award	Date awarded	Ref.
Ivory Latta	Dawn Staley Community Leadership Award	August 25, 2017	
