= 2017 Dallas Wings season =

- Head coach: Fred Williams
- Arena: College Park Center

Results
- Record: 16–18 (.471)
- Place: 4th (Western)
- Playoff finish: Lost in First Round to Washington

The 2017 WNBA season will be the 20th season for the Dallas Wings franchise of the WNBA. This will be the franchise's 2nd season in Dallas. The season tips off on May 14. Dallas started the season steadily posting an 8–8 record in May and June. It was a rocky July (3–6) but the team recovered in August by going 5–3. Despite losing their lone September game, the team qualified for the playoffs as the 7th seed with a 16–18 record. Dallas lost in the first round of the playoffs to the Washington Mystics, ending their season.

== Transactions ==
=== WNBA draft ===
Round	Pick	Player	Nationality	School/Team/Country
1	3	Evelyn Akhator	Nigeria	Kentucky
1	4	Allisha Gray	United States	South Carolina
1	10	Kaela Davis	United States	South Carolina
2	23	Breanna Lewis	United States	Kansas State
3	26	Saniya Chong	United States	Connecticut

== Roster ==
2017 Dallas Wings roster
Players
Coaches

Pos.	No.	Nat.	Name	Height	Weight	DOB	From	Yrs
G/F	13	(United States)	Christmas-Kelly, Karima	6' 0" (1.83m)	180 lb (82kg)	1989-09-11	Duke	6
G	4	(United States)	Diggins-Smith, Skylar	5' 9" (1.75m)	145 lb (66kg)	1990-08-02	Notre Dame	4
C	22	(United States)	Lewis, Breanna	6' 5" (1.96m)	205 lb (93kg)	1994-06-22	Kansas State	R
F	6	(United States)	Thornton, Kayla	6' 1" (1.85m)	190 lb (86kg)	1992-10-20	UTEP	2
F	25	(United States)	Johnson, Glory	6' 3" (1.91m)	170 lb (77kg)	1990-07-27	Tennessee	4
C	3	(United States)	Paris, Courtney	6' 4" (1.93m)	250 lb (113kg)	1987-09-21	Oklahoma	7
F	55	(United States)	Plaisance, Theresa	6' 5" (1.96m)	200 lb (91kg)	1992-05-18	LSU	4
F	23	(United States)	Powers, Aerial	6' 0" (1.83m)	157 lb (71kg)	1994-01-17	Michigan State	2
F	9	(Nigeria)	Akhator, Evelyn	6' 3" (1.91m)	180 lb (82kg)	1995-02-03	Kentucky	R
G	12	(United States)	Chong, Saniya	5' 8" (1.73m)	140 lb (64kg)	1994-06-27	Connecticut	R
G	10	(United States)	Davis, Kaela	6' 2" (1.88m)	170 lb (77kg)	1995-03-15	South Carolina	R
G	15	(United States)	Gray, Allisha	6' 1" (1.85m)	167 lb (76kg)	1992-10-20	South Carolina	2

Head coach
(United States) Fred Williams (Boise State)
Assistant coaches
(United States) Bridget Pettis (Florida)
(United States) Taj McWilliams-Franklin (St. Edward's)
Athletic trainer
(United States) Allison Russell (Tulsa)

Legend

- (C) Team captain
- (DP) Unsigned draft pick
- (FA) Free agent
- (S) Suspended
- Injured

== Game log ==
=== Preseason ===
2017 pre-season game log
April: 0–1 (Home: 0–0; Road: 0–1)

Game	Date	Team	Score	High points	High rebounds	High assists	Location Attendance	Record
1	April 29	San Antonio	L 81–87	Davis (13)	3 Tied (6)	Phillips (4)	AT&T Center; 2,834	0–1

May: 1–0 (Home: 1–0; Road: 0–0)

Game	Date	Team	Score	High points	High rebounds	High assists	Location Attendance	Record
2	May 6	Indiana	W 80–75	Davis (14)			College Park Center	1–1

2017 pre-season schedule

=== Regular season ===
2017 game log
Total: 16-18 (Home: 10–7; Road: 6–11)
May: 3–2 (Home: 1–1; Road: 2–1)

Game	Date	Team	Score	High points	High rebounds	High assists	Location Attendance	Record
1	May 14	Phoenix	W 68–58	Davis (20)	Johnson (14)	Davis (4)	Talking Stick Resort Arena; 9,640	1–0
2	May 20	Minnesota	L 87–89	Diggins-Smith (22)	Johnson (7)	Diggins-Smith (8)	College Park Center; 5,169	1–1
3	May 25	San Antonio	W 94–82	Christmas (18)	Johnson (11)	Diggins-Smith (8)	AT&T Center; 9,621	2–1
4	May 27	Phoenix	L 65–107	Johnson (12)	2 Tied (6)	Diggins-Smith (4)	Talking Stick Resort Arena; 9,245	2–2
5	May 30	Indiana	W 89–62	Christmas (27)	Gray (9)	Diggins-Smith (7)	College Park Center; 3,076	3–2

June : 5–6 (Home: 3–4; Road: 2–2)

Game	Date	Team	Score	High points	High rebounds	High assists	Location Attendance	Record
6	June 2	New York	L 89–93	Diggins-Smith (20)	Christmas (9)	2 Tied (3)	Madison Square Garden; 7,426	3–3
7	June 3	Indiana	L 85–91	Johnson (22)	Johnson (13)	Diggins-Smith (5)	Bankers Life Fieldhouse; 6,529	3–4
8	June 6	Washington	L 89–101	Diggins-Smith (23)	2 Tied (8)	Diggins-Smith (7)	College Park Center; 2,805	3–5
9	June 9	Los Angeles	W 96–90	Johnson (24)	Johnson (12)	Diggins-Smith (8)	College Park Center; 3,169	4–5
10	June 11	Minnesota	L 74–91	Christmas (21)	Johnson (8)	Diggins-Smith (4)	College Park Center; 3,998	4–6
11	June 13	Los Angeles	L 87–97	Diggins-Smith (28)	Johnson (10)	Diggins-Smith (7)	Staples Center; 7,233	4–7
12	June 16	New York	L 93–102	Diggins-Smith (23)	Johnson (11)	Johnson (3)	College Park Center; 3,152	4–8
13	June 18	Washington	W 87–83	Johnson (27)	Plaisance (8)	Diggins-Smith (8)	Verizon Center; 7,285	5–8
14	June 21	San Antonio	W 81–78	Johnson (25)	Johnson (10)	Diggins-Smith (6)	College Park Center; 4,617	6–8
15	June 23	San Antonio	W 81–69	Diggins-Smith (30)	Plaisance (8)	2 Tied (5)	AT&T Center; 7,086	7–8
16	June 25	Connecticut	W 96–82	Christmas (24)	Plaisance (9)	Diggins-Smith (9)	College Park Center; 3,408	8–8

July : 3–6 (Home: 3–1; Road: 0–5)

Game	Date	Team	Score	High points	High rebounds	High assists	Location Attendance	Record
17	July 1	Seattle	L 69–89	Johnson (18)	Johnson (10)	Diggins-Smith (4)	College Park Center; 4,038	8–9
18	July 5	Atlanta	W 94–84	Diggins-Smith (21)	Johnson (7)	Diggins-Smith (7)	College Park Center; 3,555	9–9
19	July 9	Atlanta	L 78–98	Diggins-Smith (22)	Johnson (13)	Diggins-Smith (7)	McCamish Pavilion; 4,109	9–10
20	July 12	Chicago	L 84–90	Diggins-Smith (20)	Plaisance (5)	Diggins-Smith (5)	Allstate Arena; 14,102	9–11
21	July 16	Chicago	W 112–106	Diggins-Smith (26)	Johnson (9)	Christmas (3)	College Park Center; 3,693	10–11
22	July 19	Minnesota	L 74–100	Diggins-Smith (23)	Johnson (8)	Diggins-Smith (9)	Xcel Energy Center; 17,834	10–12
23	July 25	Indiana	W 84–82	Diggins-Smith (21)	Paris (10)	Diggins-Smith (4)	College Park Center; 3,701	11–12
24	July 28	Seattle	L 93–109	Diggins-Smith (18)	Johnson (8)	Diggins-Smith (7)	KeyArena; 7,797	11–13
25	July 30	Los Angeles	L 74–95	Powers (23)	Johnson (5)	Diggins-Smith (6)	Staples Center; 11,053	11–14

August : 5–3 (Home: 3–1; Road: 2–2)

Game	Date	Team	Score	High points	High rebounds	High assists	Location Attendance	Record
26	August 4	Seattle	W 93–80	Diggins-Smith (23)	Johnson (16)	Diggins-Smith (7)	College Park Center; 3,712	12–14
27	August 6	Los Angeles	W 85–79	Johnson (23)	Johnson (13)	3 Tied (3)	College Park Center; 3,903	13–14
28	August 10	Phoenix	L 100–101	Johnson (25)	Johnson (15)	Johnson (5)	College Park Center; 4,165	13–15
29	August 12	Connecticut	L 88–96	Gray (21)	Johnson (12)	Diggins-Smith (5)	Mohegan Sun Arena; 6,898	13–16
30	August 19	Atlanta	W 90–86	Johnson (23)	Johnson (13)	Diggins-Smith (11)	College Park Center; 4,962	14–16
31	August 23	Connecticut	L 87–93	Diggins-Smith (19)	Thornton (9)	Diggins-Smith (6)	Mohegan Sun Arena; 6,465	14–17
32	August 26	Washington	W 83–78	Diggins-Smith (20)	Johnson (11)	Diggins-Smith (7)	Capital One Arena; 8,656	15–17
33	August 30	Chicago	W 99–96	Diggins-Smith (28)	2 Tied (9)	Diggins-Smith (8)	Allstate Arena; 5,896	16–17

September : 0–1 (Home: 0–1; Road: 0–0)

Game	Date	Team	Score	High points	High rebounds	High assists	Location Attendance	Record
34	September 3	New York	L 81–82	Johnson (17)	Johnson (8)	2 Tied (4)	College Park Center; 4,701	16–18

2017 season schedule

=== Playoffs ===
2017 playoff game log
WNBA First Round: 0–1 (Home: 0–0; Road: 0–1)

Game	Date	Team	Score	High points	High rebounds	High assists	Location Attendance	Series
1	September 6	Washington	L 86-76	Powers (21)	Johnson (14)	4 Tied (3)	Capital One Arena; 6,483	0–1

2017 playoff schedule

== Standings ==
#	Western Conference	W	L	PCT	GB	Home	Road	Conf.
1	Minnesota Lynx - **(1)**	27	7	.794	–	15–2	12–5	13–3
2	Los Angeles Sparks - **(2)**	26	8	.765	1	16–1	10–7	12–4
3	Phoenix Mercury - **(5)**	18	16	.529	9	9–8	9–8	7–9
4	Dallas Wings - **(7)**	16	18	.471	11	10–7	6–11	7–9
5	Seattle Storm - **(8)**	15	19	.441	12	10–7	5–12	8–8
6	San Antonio Stars - **e**	8	26	.235	19	6–11	2–15	1–15

=== Playoffs ===
**First round** Single elimination (Sept. 6)
5	**Phoenix Mercury**	**79**
8	Seattle Storm	69
6	**Washington Mystics**	**86**
7	Dallas Wings	76

**Second round** Single elimination (Sept. 10)
4	Connecticut Sun	83
5	**Phoenix Mercury**	**88**
3	New York Liberty	68
6	**Washington Mystics**	**82**

**Semifinals**; Best-of-5 (Sept. 12 – Sept. 17)
2	**Los Angeles Sparks**	**3**
5	Phoenix Mercury	0
1	**Minnesota Lynx**	**3**
6	Washington Mystics	0

**WNBA Finals**; Best-of-5 (Sept. 24 – Oct. 4)
1	**Minnesota Lynx**	**3**
2	Los Angeles Sparks	2

Note: Teams re-seeded after second round and semi-finals.

- **Bold** – Game or series winner
- Italic – Team with home-court advantage

== Statistics ==
Legend
GP	Games played	GS	Games started	MPG	Minutes per game	RPG	Rebounds per game
APG	Assists per game	SPG	Steals per game	BPG	Blocks per game	PPG	Points per game
FG%	Field-goal percentage	3P%	3-point field-goal percentage	FT%	Free-throw percentage	TO	Turnovers per game
PF	Fouls per game		Team leader		League leader

=== Regular season ===
Player	GP	GS	MPG	FG%	3P%	FT%	RPG	APG	SPG	BPG	PPG
Skylar Diggins-Smith	34	34	34.2	42.2%	35.0%	89.4%	3.5	5.8	1.3	0.8	18.5
Glory Johnson	33	33	31.0	46.4%	31.3%	76.6%	9.1	1.6	1.2	0.4	14.9
Allisha Gray	34	34	27.2	38.1%	29.9%	80.3%	3.9	1.3	1.5	0.6	13.0
Aerial Powers	12	1	20.3	33.9%	31.0%	81.8%	4.2	1.5	0.4	0.5	10.8
Karima Christmas-Kelly	34	34	29.7	38.0%	29.2%	85.1%	4.2	2.2	1.2	0.2	10.4
Theresa Plaisance	34	25	20.3	38.0%	34.4%	86.2%	4.3	0.9	0.7	0.7	7.7
Kayla Thornton	34	1	17.2	41.2%	27.9%	80.0%	3.3	0.9	0.6	0.2	6.8
Kaela Davis	33	0	15.5	38.9%	42.9%	75.4%	1.4	1.0	0.5	0.1	6.1
Courtney Paris	20	8	13.7	55.9%	—	50.0%	3.7	0.7	0.4	0.6	4.2
Saniya Chong	33	0	11.0	35.9%	23.7%	86.2%	0.9	1.0	0.7	0.1	2.7
Evelyn Akhator	15	0	4.1	25.0%	—	83.3%	0.6	0.0	0.1	0.2	0.9
Breanna Lewis	13	0	4.0	16.7%	—	75.0%	0.7	0.2	0.0	0.0	0.5

== Awards and honors ==
Recipient	Award	Date awarded	Ref.
Allisha Gray	Rookie of the Month Award	June 1, 2017	
Allisha Gray	Rookie of the Month Award	July 5, 2017	
Skylar Diggins-Smith	Player of the Week award	June 26, 2017	
Glory Johnson	Player of the Week award	August 7, 2017	
Allisha Gray	WNBA Rookie of the Year Award	September 19, 2017	
