= 2017 Indiana Fever season =

18th season in the WNBA

- Head coach: Pokey Chatman
- Arena: Bankers Life Fieldhouse

Results
- Record: 9–25 (.265)
- Place: 6th (Eastern)
- Playoff finish: Did not qualify

Media
- Television: FSMW, ESPN2, NBATV

The 2017 Indiana Fever season was the franchise's 18th season in the WNBA and their 1st season under head coach, Pokey Chatman. The Fever began play on May 14, 2017. The Fever started the season strong posting a 7–7 record in May and June. However the second half of the season was not as positive. The team finished 2–18 in the months of July August and September. This brought their final record to 9–25, which was 6th place in the Eastern Conference, and next to last in the league.

== Transactions ==
=== WNBA draft ===
The Fever made two selections in the 2017 WNBA Entry Draft. The draft was held on April 13:

Round	Pick	Player	Nationality	WNBA Team	School/Team/Country
2	17	Erica McCall	United States	Indiana Fever	Stanford
3	32	Adrienne Motley	United States	Indiana Fever	Miami (FL)

=== Trades ===
Date	Trade
February 21, 2017	Candice Dupree is acquired from the Phoenix Mercury in exchange for Camille Little and the draft rights to Jillian Alleyne from Connecticut
February 21, 2017	Phoenix also traded its 2017 first-round draft pick (17th overall) to Indiana
May 9, 2017	Jazmon Gwathmey is acquired from the San Antonio Stars in exchange for the Stars' 2018 third-round draft pick.

=== Personnel changes ===
==== Additions ====
Player	Signed	Former team
Candice Dupree	February 21, 2017	Phoenix Mercury
Erica McCall	April 13, 2017	Draft Pick
Adrienne Motley	April 13, 2017	Draft Pick
Jazmon Gwathmey	May 9, 2017	San Antonio Stars

==== Subtractions ====
Player	Left	New team
Camille Little	February 21, 2017	Phoenix Mercury
Bashaara Graves	May 8, 2017	Waived
Victoria Macaulay	May 8, 2017	Waived

== Roster ==
2017 Indiana Fever roster
Players
Coaches

Pos.	No.	Nat.	Name	Height	Weight	DOB	From	Yrs
C	11	(Canada)	Achonwa, Natalie	6' 4" (1.93m)	183 lb (83kg)	1992-11-22	Notre Dame	3
G/F	25	(United States)	Coleman, Marissa	6' 1" (1.85m)	160 lb (73kg)	1987-01-04	Maryland	9
G	20	(United States)	January, Briann	5' 8" (1.73m)	144 lb (65kg)	1987-01-11	Arizona State	9
G	42	(United States)	Johnson, Shenise	5' 11" (1.8m)	172 lb (78kg)	1990-12-09	Miami (FL)	6
F	2	(United States)	Larkins, Erlana	6' 1" (1.85m)	205 lb (93kg)	1986-04-02	North Carolina	9
F	4	(United States)	Dupree, Candice	6' 2" (1.88m)	178 lb (81kg)	1984-02-25	Temple	12
C	5	(United States)	Hamson, Jennifer	6' 7" (2.01m)	210 lb (95kg)	1992-01-23	BYU	1
G	3	(United States)	Mitchell, Tiffany	5' 9" (1.75m)	152 lb (69kg)	1984-09-23	South Carolina	2
F	14	(United States)	Peters, Devereaux	6' 2" (1.88m)	174 lb (79kg)	1989-10-08	Notre Dame	6
G	17	(United States)	Wheeler, Erica	5' 7" (1.7m)	143 lb (65kg)	1991-05-02	Rutgers	3
G	1	(Puerto Rico)	Gwathmey, Jazmon	6' 2" (1.88m)	143 lb (65kg)	1993-01-24	James Madison	2
G	32	(United States)	Pohlen, Jeanette	6' 0" (1.83m)	171 lb (78kg)	1989-05-02	Stanford	6

Head coach
(United States) Pokey Chatman (LSU)
Assistant coaches
(United States) Steven Key (Boston University)
(United States) Jessica Miller (Illinois–Chicago)
Athletic trainer
(United States) Todd Champlin (Daemen)
Strength and conditioning coach
(United States) David Williams (Central Florida)

Legend

- (C) Team captain
- (DP) Unsigned draft pick
- (FA) Free agent
- (S) Suspended
- Injured

== Schedule ==
=== Game log ===
2017 game log
Total: 9–25 (Home: 6–11 Road: 3–14)
May: 2–4 (Home: 2–0; Road: 0–4)

Game	Date	Team	Score	High points	High rebounds	High assists	Location Attendance	Record
1	May 14, 2017; 7:00 pm	Seattle	L 82–87	Johnson – 24	Johnson – 8	Johnson – 4	KeyArena; 7,969	0–1
2	May 17, 2017; 10:00 pm	Phoenix	L 62–85	Dupree – 14	Dupree – 9	Mitchell – 4	Talking Stick Resort Arena; 8,896	0–2
3	May 20, 2017; 7:00 pm	Connecticut	W 81–79	Dupree – 19	Larkins – 9	January – 4	Bankers Life Fieldhouse; 7,385	1–2
4	May 24, 2017; 7:00 pm	Los Angeles	W 93–90	Coleman – 19	Dupree – 8	January – 6	Bankers Life Fieldhouse; 5,875	2–2
5	May 28, 2017; 7:00 pm	Seattle	L 70–94	Mitchell – 13	Dupree – 5	January – 3	KeyArena; 4,722	2–3
6	May 30, 2017; 8:00 pm	Dallas	L 62–89	Achonwa – 13	Larkins – 6	Dupree – 3	College Park Center; 3,076	2–4

June: 5–3 (Home: 3–2; Road: 2–1)

Game	Date	Team	Score	High points	High rebounds	High assists	Location Attendance	Record
7	June 3, 2017; 7:00 pm	Dallas	W 91–85	Dupree – 18	Achonwa – 7 Larkins – 7	January – 7	Bankers Life Fieldhouse; 6,529	3–4
8	June 7, 2017; 10:00 pm	Phoenix	L 90–98	Wheeler – 24	Larkins – 7	Johnson – 5	Bankers Life Fieldhouse; 5,702	3–5
9	June 9, 2017; 7:00 pm	Seattle	W 83–80	Wheeler – 19	Dupree – 12	Wheeler – 6	Bankers Life Fieldhouse; 6,166	4–5
10	June 11, 2017; 3:00 pm	Washington	L 70–88	Wheeler – 15	Mitchell – 5	Wheeler – 6	Verizon Center; 6,194	4–6
11	June 15, 2017; 7:00 pm	Atlanta	W 85–74	Wheeler – 20	Dupree – 8	Wheeler – 7	Bankers Life Fieldhouse; 5,830	5–6
12	June 18, 2017; 6:00 pm	Chicago	W 91–79	Mitchell – 19	Dupree – 8	January – 7	Allstate Arena; 4,551	6–6
13	June 24, 2017; 7:00 pm	Los Angeles	L 73–84	Dupree – 14	Larkins – 7	Dupree – 3	Bankers Life Fieldhouse; 9,241	6–7
14	June 28, 2017; 12:30 pm	Chicago	W 82–75	Dupree – 17	Mitchell – 7	January – 7	Allstate Arena; 10,197	7–7

July: 1–9 (Home: 0–4; Road: 1–5)

Game	Date	Team	Score	High points	High rebounds	High assists	Location Attendance	Record
15	July 1, 2017; 4:00 pm	Connecticut	L 85–91	Johnson – 22	Dupree – 11	Wheeler – 5	Bankers Life Fieldhouse; 6,473	7–8
16	July 7, 2017; 7:30 pm	Atlanta	L 68–89	Johnson – 15	Dupree – 5	Tied – 3	McCamish Pavilion; 3,359	7–9
17	July 12, 2017; 12:00 pm	San Antonio	L 72–79	Dupree – 14	Tied – 3	January – 6	Bankers Life Fieldhouse; 12,282	7–10
18	July 14, 2017; 7:00 pm	Washington	L 52–78	January – 15	Mitchell – 8	January – 4	Bankers Life Fieldhouse; 8,007	7–11
19	July 17, 2017; 10:30 pm	Los Angeles	L 62–80	January – 12	Achonwa – 8	Dupree – 4	Staples Center; 11,386	7–12
20	July 19, 2017; 3:30 pm	Phoenix	W 84–77	Wheeler – 20	January – 7	Tied – 7	Talking Stick Resort Arena; 11,371	8–12
21	July 20, 2017; 8:00 pm	San Antonio	L 61–85	Mitchell – 13	Dupree – 6	January – 4	AT&T Center; 7,306	8–13
22	July 25, 2017; 8:00 pm	Dallas	L 82–84	January – 16	Dupree – 6	Wheeler – 9	College Park Center; 3,701	8–14
23	July 28, 2017; 7:00 pm	New York	L 84–85	Anchowa – 19	Anchowa – 7	Wheeler – 7	Bankers Life Fieldhouse; 6,617	8–15
24	July 30, 2017; 3:00 pm	Connecticut	L 73–89	Tied – 13	McCall – 9	Tied – 4	Mohegan Sun Arena; 6,145	8–16

August : 1–8 (Home: 1–4; Road: 0–4)

Game	Date	Team	Score	High points	High rebounds	High assists	Location Attendance	Record
25	August 4, 2017; 7:00 pm	Chicago	L 70–81	Dupree – 18	Mitchell – 7	January – 8	Bankers Life Fieldhouse; 8,052	8–17
26	August 6, 2017; 5:00 pm	Minnesota	W 84–82	Dupree – 31	Dupree – 9	Wheeler – 7	Bankers Life Fieldhouse; 8,226	9–17
27	August 8, 2017; 7:00 pm	New York	L 76–81	Wheeler – 33	Gwathmey-7	January – 3	Madison Square Garden; 10,068	9–18
28	August 12, 2017; 7:30 pm	Washington	L 80–100	Dupree – 26	Dupree – 8	Wheeler – 8	Verizon Center; 7,337	9–19
29	August 18, 2017; 8:00 pm	Minnesota	L 52–111	Gwathmey-12	Tied – 4	Tied – 3	Target Center; 9,621	9–20
30	August 20, 2017; 5:00 pm	Washington	L 82–87	Coleman – 20	McCall – 6	Dupree – 7	Bankers Life Fieldhouse; 7,593	9–21
31	August 23, 2017; 7:00 pm	New York	L 50–71	Tied – 10	Dupree – 6	Wheeler – 5	Bankers Life Fieldhouse; 7,118	9–22
32	August 26, 2017; 6:00 pm	Atlanta	L 74–79	Wheeler – 23	Achonwa – 9	Coleman – 4	McCamish Pavilion; 5,029	9–23
33	August 30, 2017; 7:00 pm	Minnesota	L 69–80	Wheeler – 17	Dupree – 10	Wheeler – 7	Bankers Life Fieldhouse; 7,625	9–24

September: 0–1 (Home: 0–1; Road: 0–0)

Game	Date	Team	Score	High points	High rebounds	High assists	Location Attendance	Record
34	September 2, 2017; 7:00 pm	San Antonio	L 71–75	Dupree – 19	Dupree – 13	Wheeler – 6	Bankers Life Fieldhouse; 9,420	9–25

2017 season schedule

=== Standings ===
#	Eastern Conference	W	L	PCT	GB	Home	Road	Conf.
1	New York Liberty - (3)	22	12	.647	-	13–4	9–8	10–6
2	Connecticut Sun - (4)	21	13	.636	1	12–5	9–6	10–6
3	Washington Mystics - (6)	18	16	.529	4	11–6	7–10	12-4
4	Chicago Sky - e	12	22	.353	10	4–13	8–9	6–10
5	Atlanta Dream - e	12	22	.353	10	9–8	3–14	5–11
6	Indiana Fever - e	9	25	.265	13	6–11	3–14	4–12

== Statistics ==
Legend
GP	Games played	GS	Games started	MPG	Minutes per game	RPG	Rebounds per game
APG	Assists per game	SPG	Steals per game	BPG	Blocks per game	PPG	Points per game
FG%	Field-goal percentage	3P%	3-point field-goal percentage	FT%	Free-throw percentage	TO	Turnovers per game
PF	Fouls per game		Team leader		League leader

=== Regular season ===
Player	GP	GS	MPG	FG%	3P%	FT%	RPG	APG	SPG	BPG	PPG
Candice Dupree	33	33	31.8	49.4%	0.0%	88.2%	5.8	1.6	0.9	0.5	15.0
Erica Wheeler	34	26	26.4	40.0%	33.1%	79.2%	2.2	4.1	1.4	0.0	11.8
Shenise Johnson	14	13	24.9	43.3%	33.3%	95.0%	3.4	2.5	1.5	0.3	11.3
Tiffany Mitchell	27	9	24.9	34.9%	24.6%	92.2%	3.2	1.4	1.1	0.2	10.3
Briann January	25	24	26.3	39.5%	31.6%	81.7%	1.5	3.9	0.9	0.2	9.5
Natalie Achonwa	34	17	18.3	55.7%	—	76.3%	3.7	0.7	0.4	0.5	7.1
Jazmon Gwathmey	28	7	17.1	36.0%	23.6%	75.0%	2.0	0.8	0.5	0.8	6.2
Erlana Larkins	34	17	18.8	58.1%	—	91.2%	4.2	1.1	0.5	0.3	4.9
Marissa Coleman	34	23	18.7	32.7%	32.2%	83.3%	2.0	1.0	0.3	0.1	4.9
Jeanette Pohlen-Mavunga	29	0	12.9	40.5%	38.5%	82.6%	1.0	0.7	0.2	0.0	3.4
Erica McCall	30	1	10.7	40.6%	33.3%	68.2%	2.3	0.2	0.1	0.3	3.3
Jennie Simms	4	0	13.5	30.8%	33.3%	50.0%	1.3	0.5	0.5	0.0	2.8
Jennifer Hamson	12	0	7.2	55.6%	—	85.7%	2.1	0.2	0.1	0.9	2.2
Nadia Colhado	5	0	2.6	100%	—	—	0.4	0.0	0.0	0.2	0.4
