= 2017 Chicago Sky season =

- Head coach: Amber Stocks
- Arena: Allstate Arena

Results
- Record: 12–22 (.353)
- Place: 4th (Eastern)
- Playoff finish: Did not qualify

Media
- Television: WMEU-CD; ESPN; ESPN2; NBA TV

The 2017 Chicago Sky season was the franchise's 12th season in the Women's National Basketball Association (WNBA). The Sky started the season slowly, posting a 1–5 record in May. This slow start continued into June where the team only won 2 of 9 games. The team showed improvement in July and August, posting a combined record of 9–8 in those months. An 0–2 September saw the Sky finish with an overall record of 12–22. The Sky finished in 4th place in the Eastern Conference, ahead of the Atlanta Dream via tiebreaker. The team did not qualify for the playoffs.

== Transactions ==
=== WNBA draft ===
The Sky made the following selections in the 2017 WNBA draft:

Round	Pick	Player	Nationality	School/Team/Country
1	2	Alaina Coates	United States	South Carolina
1	9	Tori Jankoska	United States	Michigan State
2	21	Chantel Osahor	United States	Washington
3	33	Makayla Epps	United States	Kentucky

=== Trades and Roster Changes ===
Date	Transaction
February 2, 2017	Elena Delle Donne is traded to the Washington Mystics in exchange for Stefanie Dolson, Kahleah Copper and Washington’s first-round pick (second overall) in the 2017 WNBA draft.
February 27, 2017	Astou Ndour-Fall was acquired from the San Antonio Stars, in exchange for Clarissa Dos Santos.
April 14, 2017	Keisha Hampton was acquired from the Minnesota Lynx. in exchange for Chantel Osahor.

== Roster ==
2017 Chicago Sky roster
Players
Coaches

Pos.	No.	Nat.	Name	Height	Weight	DOB	From	Yrs
F	35	(United States)	Hooper, Jordan	6' 2" (1.88m)	185 lb (84kg)	February 20, 1992	Nebraska	3
F	12	(United States)	Graves, Bashaara	6' 2" (1.88m)	200 lb (91kg)	March 17, 1994	Tennessee	1
F	51	(United States)	Breland, Jessica	6' 3" (1.91m)	170 lb (77kg)	February 23, 1988	North Carolina	5
G/F	2	(United States)	Copper, Kahleah	6' 1" (1.85m)	155 lb (70kg)	August 28, 1994	Rutgers	1
C	31	(United States)	Dolson, Stefanie	6' 5" (1.96m)	214 lb (97kg)	January 8, 1992	Connecticut	3
G	25	(United States)	Epps, Makayla	5' 10" (1.78m)			Kentucky	R
C	3	(Kenya)	Bulgak, Adut	6' 4" (1.93m)	156 lb (71kg)	December 20, 1992	Florida State	1
F	11	(United States)	Harris, Amber	6' 5" (1.96m)	193 lb (88kg)	January 16, 1988	Xavier	3
F	24	(United States)	Hampton, Keisha	6' 2" (1.88m)	171 lb (78kg)	February 22, 1990	DePaul
F	32	(United States)	Parker, Cheyenne	6' 4" (1.93m)	190 lb (86kg)	August 22, 1992	Middle Tennessee	2
G	23	(United States)	Pondexter, Cappie	5' 9" (1.75m)	160 lb (73kg)	January 7, 1983	Rutgers	11
G	14	(United States)	Quigley, Allie	5' 10" (1.78m)	140 lb (64kg)	June 20, 1986	DePaul	8
G	22	(United States)	Vandersloot, Courtney	5' 8" (1.73m)	145 lb (66kg)	February 8, 1989	Gonzaga	6

Head coach
(United States) Amber Stocks (Cincinnati)
Assistant coaches
(United States) Carlene Mitchell (Kansas State)
(United States) Carla Morrow (Tulsa)
Athletic trainer
(United States) Heidi Wlezien
Strength and conditioning coach
(United States) Ann Crosby (Western Michigan)

Legend

- (C) Team captain
- (DP) Unsigned draft pick
- (FA) Free agent
- (S) Suspended
- Injured

== Preseason ==
2017 pre-season game log
May: 1–1 (Home: 0–0; Road: 1–1)

Game	Date	Team	Score	High points	High rebounds	High assists	Location Attendance	Record
1	May 2; 6:00 PM (Note: All times are specified as Central Time.)	Connecticut	L 72-81	Hampton/Young (11)	Breland (8)	Epps (5)	Mohegan Sun Arena; 2782	0-1
2	May 3; 4:00 PM	New York	W 86-75	Pondexter (15)	Parker (6)	Breland (3)	Mohegan Sun Arena	1-1

2017 pre-season schedule

== Regular season ==
=== Game log ===
2017 game log
Total: 12-22 (Home: 4-13; Road: 8-9)
May: 1–5 (Home: 0–3; Road: 1–2)

Game	Date	Team	Score	High points	High rebounds	High assists	Location Attendance	Record
1	May 14; 6:00 PM	Minnesota	L 61–70	Sylvia Fowles (26)	Sylvia Fowles (10)	Augustus, Whalen (5)	Xcel Energy Center; 9,234	0–1
2	May 19; 7:30 PM	Atlanta	L 83–91	Cappie Pondexter (22)	Jessica Breland (7)	Cappie Pondexter (7)	Allstate Arena; 6,631	0–2
3	May 21; 2:00 PM	Atlanta	W 75–71	Stefanie Dolson (23)	Jessica Breland (12)	Cappie Pondexter (11)	McCamish Pavilion; 4,859	1–2
4	May 24; 11:30 AM	Washington	L 82-67	Cappie Pondexter (17)	Stefanie Dolson (11)	Cappie Pondexter (10)	Allstate Arena; 6,714	1-3
5	May 26; 6:00 PM	Washington	L 88-79	Quigley (17)	Pondexter (6), Breland (6)	Pondexter (8)	Verizon Center; 6,438	1-4
6	May 28; 5:00 PM	Connecticut	L 97-79	Young (17)	Breland (11)	Pondexter (9)	Allstate Arena; 4,498	1-5

June : 2–7 (Home: 0–4; Road: 2–3)

Game	Date	Team	Score	High points	High rebounds	High assists	Location Attendance	Record
7	June 1; 7:00 PM	Phoenix	L 99-91	Dolson (21)	Boyette (9)	Pondexter (8)	Allstate Arena; 4,634	1-6
8	June 6; 9:30 PM	Los Angeles	L 79-70	Vandersloot (13)	Boyette (9)	Vandersloot; Quigley (5)	Staples Center; 8,523	1-7
9	June 10; 7:00 PM	San Antonio	W 85-81 (OT)	Dolson (25)	Dolson (9)	Pondexter (6)	AT&T Center; 6,191	2-7
10	June 16; 9:00 PM	Phoenix	L 86-78	Quigley (19)	Bpyette (10)	Quigley (6)	Talking Stick Resort Arena; 10,249	2-8
11	June 18; 5:00 PM	Indiana	L 91-79	Quigley (18)	Boyette (10)	Quigley (6)	Allstate Arena; 4,551	2-9
12	June 23; 6:30 PM	Atlanta	W 82-78	Quigley (22)	Dolson (8)	Pondexter (9)	McCamish Pavilion; 4,237	3-9
13	June 25; 5:00 PM	Washington	L 97-63	Quigley (18)	Young (5)	Vandersloot; Young (3)	Allstate Arena; 5,344	3-10
14	June 28; 11:30 AM	Indiana	L 82-75	Breland (22)	Boyette (10)	Vandersloot (8)	Allstate Arena; 10,197	3-11
15	June 30; 7:00 PM	San Antonio	L 89-82	Quigley (27)	Vandersloot; Boyette (4)	Vandersloot (9)	AT&T Center; 4,942	3-12

July : 5–4 (Home: 2–2; Road: 3–2)

Game	Date	Team	Score	High points	High rebounds	High assists	Location Attendance	Record
16	July 8; 7:00 PM	Minnesota	W 100-76	Vandersloot (26)	Vandersloot (7)	Vandersloot (13)	Allstate Arena; 6,942	4-12
17	July 12; 11:30 AM	Dallas	W 90-84	Quigley (22)	Breland (12)	Vandersloot (12)	Allstate Arena; 14,102	5-12
18	July 14; 6:30 PM	New York	W 78-68	Dolson (23)	Young (7)	Vandersloot (9)	Madison Square Garden; 9,341	6-12
19	July 16; 3:30 PM	Dallas	L 112-106 (2OT)	Dolson (26)	Dolson (10)	Vandersloot (10)	College Park Center; 3,693	6-13
20	July 18; 8:00 PM	Seattle	W 94-83	Quigley (25)	Dolson (8)	Vandersloot (6)	KeyArena; 8,358	7-13
21	July 20	Los Angeles	W 82-80	Dolson (15)	Young; Breland (7)	Vandersloot (14)	Staples Center; 16,166	8-13
22	July 25	Connecticut	L 93-72	Quigley (20)	Dolson (7)	Young; Vandersloot (5)	Mohegan Sun Arena; 5,631	8-14
23	July 28	Phoenix	L 86-80	Dolson (29)	Breland (12)	Vandersloot (10)	Allstate Arena; 6,088	8-15
24	July 30	New York	L 82-86	Quigley (22)	Breland (10)	Vandersloot (10)	Allstate Arena; 5,834	8-16 (Note: Televised on ESPN 2.)

August : 4–4 (Home: 2–3; Road: 2–1)

Game	Date	Team	Score	High points	High rebounds	High assists	Location Attendance	Record
25	August 4	Indiana	W 81-70	Vandersloot (5)	Breland (8)	Vandersloot (10)	Bankers Life Fieldhouse; 8,052	9-16
26	August 5	Atlanta	W 91-86	Vandersloot (26)	Vandersloot (7)	Vandersloot (10)	Allstate Arena; 5,757	10-16
27	August 10	San Antonio	W 94-74	Vandersloot (21)	Breland (7)	Vandersloot (10)	Allstate Arena; 4,686	11-16
28	August 18	Los Angeles	L 106-115	Quigley (26)	Dolson (10)	Vandersloot (12)	Allstate Arena; 6,826	11-17
29	August 20	Seattle	L 66-103	Dolson (10)	Breland (9)	Vandersloot (6)	Allstate Arena; 6,020	11-18
30	August 25	Connecticut	W 96-83	Breland (15)	Dolson (9)	Vandersloot (12)	Mohegan Sun Arena; 7,761	12-18
31	August 27	New York	L 62-92	Dolson (22)	Bulgak (5)	Pondexter (6)	Madison Square Garden; 9,317	12-19
32	August 30	Dallas	L 96-99	Quigley (25)	Breland (8)	Vandersloot (12)	Allstate Arena; 5,896	12-20

September : 0–2 (Home: 0–1; Road: 0–1)

Game	Date	Team	Score	High points	High rebounds	High assists	Location Attendance	Record
33	September 1	Minnesota	L 87-110	Copper (21)	Dolson (10)	Vandersloot (9)	Xcel Energy Center; 9,709	12-21
34	September 3	Seattle	L 80-85	Copper (18)	Dolson (8)	Vandersloot (8)	Allstate Arena; 7,199	12-22

2017 season schedule

=== Standings ===
#	Eastern Conference	W	L	PCT	GB	Home	Road	Conf.
1	New York Liberty - (3)	22	12	.647	-	13–4	9–8	10–6
2	Connecticut Sun - (4)	21	13	.636	1	12–5	9–6	10–6
3	Washington Mystics - (6)	18	16	.529	4	11–6	7–10	12-4
4	Chicago Sky - e	12	22	.353	10	4–13	8–9	6–10
5	Atlanta Dream - e	12	22	.353	10	9–8	3–14	5–11
6	Indiana Fever - e	9	25	.265	13	6–11	3–14	4–12

Notes

(#) – Conference Standing
Playoff Seeds shown next to team name
e – Eliminated from playoffs

== Statistics ==
Legend
GP	Games played	GS	Games started	MPG	Minutes per game	RPG	Rebounds per game
APG	Assists per game	SPG	Steals per game	BPG	Blocks per game	PPG	Points per game
FG%	Field-goal percentage	3P%	3-point field-goal percentage	FT%	Free-throw percentage	TO	Turnovers per game
PF	Fouls per game		Team leader		League leader

=== Regular season ===
Player	GP	GS	MPG	FG%	3P%	FT%	RPG	APG	SPG	BPG	PPG
Allie Quigley	31	31	32.3	50.5%	43.0%	89.3%	3.3	3.6	0.8	0.5	16.4
Courtney Vandersloot	27	22	30.3	51.6%	38.2%	86.1%	3.7	8.1	1.2	0.2	11.5
Stefanie Dolson	33	33	29.3	56.1%	43.7%	87.0%	5.8	2.6	0.5	1.3	14.5
Tamera Young	24	21	29.0	36.5%	34.4%	69.0%	3.8	2.5	1.4	0.4	10.2
Cappie Pondexter	29	15	27.2	36.7%	25.7%	79.5%	2.9	4.3	0.7	0.2	9.6
Jessica Breland	34	33	24.5	47.6%	38.1%	78.7%	6.3	1.6	0.6	1.7	9.5
Jordan Hooper	10	0	18.6	36.8%	37.0%	50.0%	2.2	0.6	0.5	0.1	6.0
Imani McGee-Stafford	22	4	15.5	44.4%	33.3%	70.6%	4.4	0.5	0.4	0.8	4.6
Kahleah Copper	34	10	14.3	46.5%	29.4%	83.0%	1.9	0.4	0.3	0.1	6.7
Cheyenne Parker	23	0	12.4	46.4%	0.0%	63.9%	3.4	0.6	0.3	0.7	3.8
Adut Bulgak	5	0	12.2	40.9%	33.3%	60.0%	4.0	0.0	1.0	0.4	4.4
Bashaara Graves	10	0	9.2	50.0%	—	57.1%	2.3	0.5	0.2	0.1	2.6
Keisha Hampton	19	1	7.8	41.4%	41.7%	100%	0.6	0.3	0.3	0.2	3.6
Amber Harris	27	0	5.9	39.6%	0.0%	62.5%	1.6	0.2	0.1	0.3	1.6
Makayla Epps	17	0	3.8	16.7%	0.0%	55.6%	0.2	0.4	0.1	0.0	0.6

== Awards and honors ==
Recipient	Award	Date awarded	Ref.
Stefanie Dolson	Player of the Week	July 16, 2017	
Courtney Vandersloot	Player of the Week	August 7, 2017	
