= 2017 San Antonio Stars season =

- Head coach: Vickie Johnson
- Arena: AT&T Center

Results
- Record: 8–26 (.235)
- Place: 6th (Western)
- Playoff finish: Did not qualify

The 2017 WNBA season was the 21st season for the San Antonio Stars franchise of the WNBA. It was also their 15th and last in San Antonio, as they moved to Las Vegas and became the Aces the following season.

The season started in a difficult fashion, as the team lost all six of its games in May. The closest loss was a six-point loss at home to Phoenix. The team would go on to lose the first eight games in May, extending their losing streak to fourteen straight games. During that streak, there was an overtime loss to Chicago and a four-point loss at Dallas. The Stars won their first game of the season on June 30, in a rematch with Chicago. The team went on to win two out of its nine games in July, defeating Indiana at home and on the road. Six of their seven losses in the month were by double-digits. The remainder of the season showed a marked improvement for the team, as they won four of their first five games in August. Their only loss game in Chicago. However, they lost four straight games before winning the final game of the season, at Indiana. Their 5–5 finish to the season saw them finish with a final mark of 8–26. They were the only team from the Western Conference to not qualify for the playoffs.

== Transactions ==
=== WNBA draft ===
Round	Pick	Player	Nationality	School/Team/Country
1	1	Kelsey Plum	United States	Washington
1	5	Nia Coffey	United States	Northwestern
3	25	Schaquilla Nunn	United States	Tennessee

=== Transactions ===
Date	Details
January 31, 2017	Danielle Robinson was traded to the Phoenix Mercury in exchange for Isabelle Harrison and the 5th pick in the 2017 WNBA draft.
February 7, 2017	Erika de Souza was acquired from the Chicago Sky.
February 27, 2017	Astou Ndour was traded to the Chicago Sky in exchange for Clarissa Dos Santos .
May 9, 2017	Jazmon Gwathmey was traded to the Indiana Fever in exchange for the Fever;s third round pick in the 2018 WNBA draft.
June 28, 2017	Monique Currie was traded to the Phoenix Mercury, in exchange for Shay Murphy, Sophie Brunner, and the Mercury's third round pick in the 2018 draft.

== Roster ==
2017 San Antonio Stars roster
Players
Coaches

Pos.	No.	Nat.	Name	Height	Weight	DOB	From	Yrs
C	40	(Canada)	Alexander, Kayla	6' 4" (1.93m)	195 lb (88kg)	1991-01-05	Arizona State	4
G	17	(United States)	Holmes, Sequoia	6' 1" (1.85m)	155 lb (70kg)	1986-06-13	UNLV	2
F	12	(United States)	Coffey, Nia	6' 1" (1.85m)	170 lb (77kg)	1995-05-21	Northwestern	R
G	51	(United States)	Colson, Sydney	5' 8" (1.73m)	140 lb (64kg)	1989-08-06	Texas A&M	3
G	14	(United States)	Murphy, Shay	5' 11" (1.8m)	164 lb (74kg)	1985-04-15	USC	9
F	5	(United States)	Hamby, Dearica	6' 3" (1.91m)	189 lb (86kg)	1993-11-06	Wake Forest	2
G	4	(United States)	Jefferson, Moriah	5' 6" (1.68m)	122 lb (55kg)	1994-03-08	Connecticut	1
G/F	21	(United States)	McBride, Kayla	5' 11" (1.8m)	174 lb (79kg)	1992-06-25	Notre Dame	3
G/F	6	(United States)	Montgomery, Alex	6' 1" (1.85m)	185 lb (84kg)	1988-11-12	Georgia Tech	6
C	20	(United States)	Harrison, Isabelle	6' 3" (1.91m)	183 lb (83kg)	1993-09-27	Kentucky	3
F	21	(United States)	Burdick, Cierra	6' 2" (1.88m)	172 lb (78kg)	1993-09-30	Tennessee	13
C	11	(Brazil)	dos Santos, Clarissa (injured) (S)	6' 1" (1.85m)	196 lb (89kg)	1988-03-10	Brazil	4
G	10	(United States)	Plum, Kelsey	5' 8" (1.73m)	145 lb (66kg)	1994-08-24	Washington	R

Head coach
(United States) Vickie Johnson (Louisiana Tech)
Athletic trainer
(United States) Tonya Holley (St. Andrews Presbyterian)
Strength and conditioning coach
(United States) Chrissy Stragisher (Muskingum)

Legend

- (C) Team captain
- (DP) Unsigned draft pick
- (FA) Free agent
- (S) Suspended
- Injured

== Game log ==
=== Preseason ===
2017 pre-season game log
April: 1–0 (Home: 1–0; Road: 0–0)

Game	Date	Team	Score	High points	High rebounds	High assists	Location Attendance	Record
1	April 29	Los Angeles	L 59–73	Plum (19)	2 Tied (7)	2 Tied (5)	AT&T Center; 2,834	1–0

May: 0–1 (Home: 0–0; Road: 0–1)

Game	Date	Team	Score	High points	High rebounds	High assists	Location Attendance	Record
2	May 6	Los Angeles	L 59–73	Harrison (22)	Harrison (5)	Currie (3)	Pasadena College; 1,000	1–1

2017 pre-season schedule

=== Regular season ===
2017 game log
Total: 8-26 (Home: 6–11; Road: 2–15)
May: 0–6 (Home: 0–2; Road: 0–4)

Game	Date	Team	Score	High points	High rebounds	High assists	Location Attendance	Record
1	May 13	@ New York	L 64–73	Currie (23)	Montgomery (11)	Colson (2)	Madison Square Garden; 8,207	0–1
2	May 14	@ Washington	L 74–89	Currie (31)	Currie (6)	Montgomery (5)	Capital One Arena; 6,126	0–2
3	May 19	Phoenix	L 72–78	Harrison (16)	Montgomery (12)	Currie (4)	AT&T Center; 6,400	0–3
4	May 25	Dallas	L 82–94	McBride (18)	Harrison (12)	Currie (4)	AT&T Center; 9,621	0–5
5	May 28	@ Minnesota	L 66–80	McBride (18)	Currie (9)	Jefferson (8)	Xcel Energy Center; 9,034	0–5
6	May 31	@ Atlanta	L 70–77	Currie (14)	2 Tied (8)	Currie (4)	McCamish Pavilion; 3,813	0–6

June : 1–8 (Home: 1–4; Road: 0–4)

Game	Date	Team	Score	High points	High rebounds	High assists	Location Attendance	Record
7	June 3	Connecticut	L 77–85	McBride (27)	Montgomery (7)	Plum (7)	AT&T Center; 7,128	0–7
8	June 6	Seattle	L 76–85	McBride (21)	Alexander (7)	2 Tied (5)	AT&T Center; 4,260	0–8
9	June 10	Chicago	L 81–85 (OT)	Jefferson (18)	Montgomery (7)	2 Tied (4)	AT&T Center; 6,191	0–9
10	June 15	@ Los Angeles	L 75–80	Jefferson (24)	Harrison (8)	McBride (5)	Staples Center; 9,104	0–10
11	June 18	@ Seattle	L 57–75	McBride (11)	2 Tied (9)	2 Tied (2)	KeyArena; 9,686	0–11
12	June 21	@ Dallas	L 78–81	Currie (29)	Harrison (6)	Jefferson (6)	College Park Center; 4,617	0–12
13	June 23	Dallas	L 69–81	McBride (19)	2 Tied (6)	Currie (6)	AT&T Center; 7,086	0–13
14	June 25	@ Minnesota	L 78–87	Jefferson (19)	Harrison (9)	Jefferson (8)	Xcel Energy Center; 9,013	0–14
15	June 30	Chicago	W 89–82	Harrison (19)	2 Tied (10)	Jefferson (8)	AT&T Center; 4,942	1–14

July : 2–7 (Home: 1–4; Road: 1–3)

Game	Date	Team	Score	High points	High rebounds	High assists	Location Attendance	Record
16	July 5	Connecticut	L 56–89	McBride (12)	2 Tied (6)	Colson (3)	AT&T Center; 3,210	1–15
17	July 7	Phoenix	L 77–92	McBride (22)	2 Tied (5)	Plum (6)	AT&T Center; 8,232	1–16
18	July 12	@ Indiana	W 79–72	McBride (18)	de Souza (7)	McBride (6)	Bankers Life Fieldhouse; 12,282	2–16
19	July 16	@ Connecticut	L 75–89	Harrison (17)	Hamby (10)	Jefferson (3)	Mohegan Sun Arena; 6,355	2–17
20	July 18	@ Atlanta	L 75–88	Harrison (22)	Harrison (9)	Jefferson (5)	McCamish Pavilion; 7,413	2–18
21	July 20	Indiana	W 85–61	Harrison (18)	Harrison (9)	Jefferson (8)	AT&T Center; 7,306	3–18
22	July 25	Washington	L 76–85	2 Tied (15)	Montgomery (11)	2 Tied (3)	AT&T Center; 9,244	3–19
23	July 28	Los Angeles	L 73–85	McBride (20)	Harrison (6)	Jefferson (6)	AT&T Center; 5,777	3–20
24	July 30	@ Phoenix	L 64–81	Murphy (14)	Harrison (13)	McBride (2)	Talking Stick Resort Arena; 10,108	3–21

August : 4–4 (Home: 4–1; Road: 0–3)

Game	Date	Team	Score	High points	High rebounds	High assists	Location Attendance	Record
25	August 1	New York	W 93–81	McBride (31)	Harrison (8)	Jefferson (5)	AT&T Center; 3,430	4–21
26	August 4	Washington	W 76–74	Harrison (20)	Harrison (10)	Plum (12)	AT&T Center; 4,955	5–21
27	August 5	Seattle	W 87–80 (OT)	Plum (23)	Harrison (13)	Montgomery (5)	AT&T Center; 5,869	6–21
28	August 10	@ Chicago	L 74–94	Hamby (17)	Harrison (9)	Plum (8)	Allstate Arena; 4,686	6–22
29	August 12	Atlanta	W 84–68	Harrison (23)	Hamby (8)	Plum (6)	AT&T Center; 6,953	7–22
30	August 18	@ Seattle	L 78–79	Hamby (19)	Harrison (12)	Plum (5)	KeyArena; 9,686	7–23
31	August 22	@ Los Angeles	L 55–75	Montgomery (12)	Montgomery (7)	Colson (2)	Staples Center; 12,433	7–24
32	August 25	Minnesota	L 70–89	2 Tied (15)	Montgomery (10)	Plum (5)	AT&T Center; 7,950	7–25

September : 1–1 (Home: 0–0; Road: 1–1)

Game	Date	Team	Score	High points	High rebounds	High assists	Location Attendance	Record
33	September 1	@ New York	L 69–81	Plum (18)	Montgomery (10)	McBride (8)	Madison Square Garden; 10,108	7–26
34	September 2	@ Indiana	W 75–71	McBride (28)	McBride (11)	McBride (6)	Bankers Life Fieldhouse; 9,420	8–26

2017 season schedule

== Standings ==
#	Western Conference	W	L	PCT	GB	Home	Road	Conf.
1	Minnesota Lynx - (1)	27	7	.794	–	15–2	12–5	13–3
2	Los Angeles Sparks - (2)	26	8	.765	1	16–1	10–7	12–4
3	Phoenix Mercury - (5)	18	16	.529	9	9–8	9–8	7–9
4	Dallas Wings - (7)	16	18	.471	11	10–7	6–11	7–9
5	Seattle Storm - (8)	15	19	.441	12	10–7	5–12	8–8
6	San Antonio Stars - e	8	26	.235	19	6–11	2–15	1–15

== Statistics ==
Legend
GP	Games played	GS	Games started	MPG	Minutes per game	RPG	Rebounds per game
APG	Assists per game	SPG	Steals per game	BPG	Blocks per game	PPG	Points per game
FG%	Field-goal percentage	3P%	3-point field-goal percentage	FT%	Free-throw percentage	TO	Turnovers per game
PF	Fouls per game		Team leader		League leader

=== Regular season ===
Player	GP	GS	MPG	FG%	3P%	FT%	RPG	APG	SPG	BPG	PPG
Kayla McBride	30	29	33.2	38.1	31.0	92.5	4.1	2.6	1.1	0.2	15.4
Isabelle Harrison	34	33	26.6	50.0	50.0	63.5	6.4	1.4	0.8	0.7	11.4
Moriah Jefferson	21	9	24.5	52.3	45.0	74.1	1.8	4.4	1.6	0.1	9.1
Alex Montgomery	34	31	23.5	37.0	30.7	82.6	5.7	2.1	0.6	0.3	6.0
Monique Currie	14	3	23.1	43.4	35.9	82.5	4.8	2.1	0.6	0.4	11.8
Kelsey Plum	31	23	22.9	34.6	36.5	87.0	1.9	3.4	0.5	0.1	8.5
Dearica Hamby	34	3	20.2	45.7	37.5	60.8	4.2	1.0	0.9	0.3	7.8
Haley Peters	2	0	17.5	37.5	60.0	—	1.0	0.5	0.0	0.0	4.5
Kayla Alexander	34	10	15.4	58.2	—	90.9	3.1	0.5	0.4	0.5	6.2
Cierra Burdick	4	0	12.5	81.8	0.0	—	1.5	1.3	0.3	0.0	4.5
Erika de Souza	27	21	12.5	47.9	—	100	2.6	0.7	0.3	0.4	3.6
Sydney Colson	28	4	11.6	33.0	20.0	68.8	0.5	2.0	0.5	0.1	2.9
Sequoia Holmes	27	3	11.3	34.4	29.2	61.5	0.9	0.9	0.5	0.2	3.3
Nia Coffey	27	1	7.8	27.1	0.0	72.7	1.9	0.2	0.2	0.2	1.8
Shay Murphy	17	0	7.4	40.0	45.0	66.7	0.9	0.6	0.2	0.1	2.2
Sophie Brunner	1	0	2.0	—	—	—	0.0	0.0	0.0	0.0	0.0
