= 2017 Atlanta Dream season =

- Head coach: Michael Cooper
- Arena: McCamish Pavilion

Results
- Record: 12–22 (.353)
- Place: 5th (Eastern)
- Playoff finish: Did not qualify

Media
- Television: FS South (FS-S), SportSouth (SSO)

The 2017 WNBA season was the 10th season for the Atlanta Dream of the Women's National Basketball Association. The team began its season on May 21, 2017 against the Chicago Sky, in its new interim home of McCamish Pavilion on the Georgia Tech campus. The Dream had a strong start to the season posting a 4–1 record in May. However, the team finished 1–6 in June, falling under .500. The team couldn't recover its form for the rest of the season finishing a combined 7–15 in the last three months of the season. Their final record of 12–22 placed them 5th in the Eastern Conference, and failed to qualify the team for the playoffs.

== Transactions ==
=== WNBA draft ===
| Round | Pick | Player | Nationality | School/team/country |
|---|---|---|---|---|
| 1 | 7 | Brittney Sykes | United States | Syracuse |
| 2 | 19 | Jordan Reynolds | United States | Tennessee |
| 3 | 31 | Oderah Chidom | United States | Duke |

=== Trades and Roster Changes ===
| Date | Transaction |
|---|---|
| January 3, 2017 | Cored Angel McCoughtry |
| January 3, 2017 | Extended Qualifying Offers to Layshia Clarendon and Meighan Simmons |
| January 4, 2017 | Angel McCoughtry announced that she will miss the 2017 season due to Rest |
| January 24, 2017 | Waived Carla Cortijo |
| January 26, 2017 | Traded Reshanda Gray to the Connecticut Sun in exchange for Aneika Henry-Morello |
| February 1, 2017 | Signed Layshia Clarendon and Brianna Kiesel |
| February 1, 2017 | Signed Meighan Simmons and Nirra Fields to training-camp contracts |
| February 7, 2017 | Signed Markeisha Gatling to a training-camp contract |
| February 9, 2017 | Signed Whitney Knight to a training-camp contract |
| February 22, 2017 | Signed Rachel Jarry to a training-camp contract |
| March 17, 2017 | Signed Darxia Morris to a training-camp contract |
| April 11, 2017 | Signed Sarah Imovbioh to a training-camp contract |
| April 17, 2017 | Signed Jordan Reynolds to a rookie-scale contract |
| April 17, 2017 | Signed Peyton Little to a training-camp contract |
| April 19, 2017 | Signed Brittney Sykes to a Rookie Scale Contract |
| April 20, 2017 | Signed Oderah Chidom to a rookie-scale contract |
| April 28, 2017 | Waived Peyton Little and Nirra Fields |
| May 3, 2017 | Waived Markeisha Gatling and Jordan Reynolds |
| May 6, 2017 | Waived Sarah Imovbioh, Rachel Jarry, Whitney Knight, and Oderah Chidom |
| May 6, 2017 | Signed Tyaunna Marshall |
| May 11, 2017 | Waived Darxia Morris and Tyaunna Marshall |
| June 7, 2017 | Temporarily Suspend Sancho Lyttle due to Overseas Commitments |
| June 8, 2017 | Traded a 2nd round pick in the 2018 WNBA draft to the Connecticut Sun in exchange for Jordan Hooper |
| June 25, 2017 | Waived Brianna Kiesel and Rachel Hollivay |
| June 26, 2017 | Activated Sancho Lyttle from the Temporary Suspension List |
| June 26, 2017 | Signed Darxia Morris |
| July 6, 2017 | Waived Meighan Simmons |
| July 17, 2017 | Waived Darxia Morris |
| July 17, 2017 | Signed Chelsea Hopkins to a 7-day contract |
| July 24, 2017 | Signed Chelsea Hopkins to a 2nd 7-day contract |
| July 31, 2017 | Traded Jordan Hooper and a 1st round pick in the 2018 WNBA draft to the Chicago Sky in exchange for Imani McGee-Stafford, Tamera Young, and a 2nd round pick in the 2018 WNBA draft |

== Roster ==
2017 Atlanta Dream roster
Players
Coaches

| Pos. | No. | Nat. | Name | Height | Weight | DOB | From | Yrs |
|---|---|---|---|---|---|---|---|---|
| G | 10 | (United States) | Ajavon, Matee | 5' 8" (1.73m) | 160 lb (73kg) | 1986-05-07 | Syracuse | R |
| G | 7 | (United States) | Sykes, Brittney | 5' 9" (1.75m) | 146 lb (66kg) | 1994-02-07 | Rutgers | 10 |
| G | 23 | (United States) | Clarendon, Layshia | 5' 9" (1.75m) | 140 lb (64kg) | 1991-05-02 | California | 5 |
| C | 12 | (Brazil) | Dantas, Damiris | 6' 3" (1.91m) | 196 lb (89kg) | 1992-11-17 | Brazil | 4 |
| F/C | 13 | (Jamaica) | Henry, Aneika | 6' 4" (1.93m) | 192 lb (87kg) | 1986-02-13 | Florida | 6 |
| G | 15 | (United States) | Hayes, Tiffany | 5' 10" (1.78m) | 155 lb (70kg) | 1989-09-20 | Connecticut | 6 |
| C | 34 | (United States) | Boyette, Imani | 6' 7" (2.01m) | 195 lb (88kg) | 1992-10-11 | Texas | 1 |
| G | 32 | (United States) | Holmes, Bria | 6' 1" (1.85m) | 170 lb (77kg) | 1994-04-19 | West Virginia | R |
| F | 20 | (Spain) | Lyttle, Sancho | 6' 4" (1.93m) | 175 lb (79kg) | 1983-09-20 | Houston | 13 |
| G/F | 11 | (United States) | Young, Tamera | 6' 2" (1.88m) | 170 lb (77kg) | 1986-10-30 | Tennessee | 9 |
| F/C | 52 | (United States) | Williams, Elizabeth | 6' 3" (1.91m) | 192 lb (87kg) | 1993-06-23 | Duke | 3 |

Head coach
(United States) Michael Cooper (New Mexico)
Assistant coaches
(United States) Miles Cooper (USC)
(United States) Karleen Thompson (USC)
Athletic trainer
(United States) Michael Douglas (Morehouse)

Legend

- (C) Team captain
- (DP) Unsigned draft pick
- (FA) Free agent
- (S) Suspended
- Injured

=== Depth ===
| Pos. | Starter | Bench |
|---|---|---|
| C | Elizabeth Williams | Imani Boyette |
| PF | Sancho Lyttle | Damiris Dantas; Aneika Henry-Morello |
| SF | Brittney Sykes | Bria Holmes |
| SG | Tiffany Hayes | Tamera Young |
| PG | Layshia Clarendon | Matee Ajavon |

== Schedule ==
=== Preseason ===
2018 Schedule: Preseason
Total: 0–1 (Home: 0–0; Road: 0–1)

| Game | Date | Opponent | Score | High points | High rebounds | High assists | Location/Attendance | Record |
|---|---|---|---|---|---|---|---|---|
| 1 | May 5 | Minnesota | L 67-113 | Holmes (13) | Tied (5) | Sykes (4) | Xcel Energy Center; 5,132 | 0-1 |

2017 pre-season schedule

=== Regular season ===
2017 Regular Season
Total: 12–22 (Home: 9–8; Road: 3–14)
May: 4–1 (Home: 2–1; Road: 2–0)

| Game | Date | Opponent | Score | High points | High rebounds | High assists | Location/Attendance | Record |
|---|---|---|---|---|---|---|---|---|
| 1 | May 13 | Connecticut | W 81–74 | Hayes (19) | Williams (9) | Tied (3) | Mohegan Sun Arena; 6,444 | 1-0 |
| 2 | May 19 | Chicago | W 91-83 | Hayes (23) | Williams (11) | Clarendon (11) | Allstate Arena; 6,631 | 2-0 |
| 3 | May 21 | Chicago | L 75-71 | Tied (17) | Williams (13) | Clarendon (9) | McCamish Pavilion; 4,859 | 2-1 |
| 4 | May 27 | Los Angeles | W 75-73 | Hayes (24) | Williams (9) | Clarendon (12) | McCamish Pavilion; 4,253 | 3-1 |
| 5 | May 31 | San Antonio | W 77-70 | Hayes (16) | Williams (9) | Clarendon (8) | McCamish Pavilion; 3,813 | 4-1 |

June: 1–6 (Home: 0–2; Road: 1–4)

| Game | Date | Opponent | Score | High points | High rebounds | High assists | Location/Attendance | Record |
|---|---|---|---|---|---|---|---|---|
| 6 | June 4 | Washington | L 72–78 | Hayes (24) | Williams (9) | Tied (9) | Verizon Center; 5,320 | 4-2 |
| 7 | June 7 | New York | L 61-76 | Tied (14) | Lyttle (12) | Tied (3) | Madison Square Garden; 14,816 | 4-3 |
| 8 | June 10 | Connecticut | L 71-104 | Dantas (16) | Williams (9) | Clarendon (4) | Mohegan Sun Arena; 5,327 | 4-4 |
| 9 | June 13 | Seattle | W 91-86 | Dantas (22) | Clarendon (8) | Clarendon (6) | KeyArena; 4,352 | 5-4 |
| 10 | June 15 | Indiana | L 74-85 | Tied (17) | Dantas (8) | Clarendon (8) | Bankers Life Fieldhouse; 5,830 | 5-5 |
| 11 | June 23 | Chicago | L 78-82 | Williams (20) | Williams (10) | Clarendon (5) | McCamish Pavilion; 4,237 | 5-6 |
| 12 | June 30 | Los Angeles | L 76-85 | Hayes (18) | Tied (5) | Tied 6 | McCamish Pavilion; 4,119 | 5-6 |

July: 5–6 (Home: 5–2; Road: 0–4)

| Game | Date | Opponent | Score | High points | High rebounds | High assists | Location/Attendance | Record |
|---|---|---|---|---|---|---|---|---|
| 13 | July 2 | New York | W 81-72 | Sykes (19) | Sykes (9) | Clarendon (9) | McCamish Pavilion; 3,521 | 6-7 |
| 14 | July 5 | Dallas | L 84-94 | Hayes (16) | Dantas (9) | Clarendon (8) | College Park Center; 3,555 | 6-8 |
| 15 | July 7 | Indiana | W 89-68 | Clarendon (27) | Clarendon (8) | Clarendon (6) | McCamish Pavilion; 3,359 | 7-8 |
| 16 | July 9 | Dallas | W 98-78 | Hayes (19) | Sykes (8) | Clarendon (8) | McCamish Pavilion; 4,019 | 8-8 |
| 17 | July 12 | Phoenix | L 84-89 | Clarendon (21) | Williams (10) | Clarendon (10) | Talking Stick Resort Arena; 9,342 | 8-9 |
| 18 | July 15 | Seattle | L 84-90 | Hayes (19) | Dantas (9) | Clarendon (8) | KeyArena; 6,993 | 8-10 |
| 19 | July 18 | San Antonio | W 88-75 | Hayes (25) | Lyttle (10) | Clarendon (7) | McCamish Pavilion; 7,413 | 9-10 |
| 20 | July 19 | Washington | L 96-100 | Sykes (27) | Lyttle (11) | Clarendon (8) | Verizon Center; 15,597 | 9-11 |
| 21 | July 25 | Phoenix | W 99-91 | Sykes (20) | Sykes (13) | Clarendon (9) | McCamish Pavilion; 4,053 | 10-11 |
| 22 | July 28 | Minnesota | L 80-90 | Hayes (25) | Lyttle (6) | Clarendon (8) | McCamish Pavilion; 4,197 | 10-12 |
| 23 | July 30 | Washington | L 70-77 | Williams (18) | Lyttle (9) | Clarendon (10) | McCamish Pavilion; 4,185 | 10-13 |

August: 2–7 (Home: 2–3; Road: 0–4)

| Game | Date | Opponent | Score | High points | High rebounds | High assists | Location/Attendance | Record |
|---|---|---|---|---|---|---|---|---|
| 24 | August 3 | Minnesota | L 54-69 | Clarendon (18) | Lyttle (11) | Clarendon (5) | Xcel Energy Center; 9,622 | 10-14 |
| 25 | August 5 | Chicago | L 86-91 | Tied (13) | Williams (12) | Clarendon (5) | Allstate Arena; 5,757 | 10-15 |
| 26 | August 8 | Minnesota | L 72-81 | Williams (16) | Tied (11) | Holmes (5) | McCamish Pavilion; 4,006 | 10-16 |
| 27 | August 11 | New York | L 77-83 | Sykes (16) | Williams (6) | Clarendon (8) | McCamish Pavilion; 5,158 | 10-17 |
| 28 | August 12 | San Antonio | L 66-84 | Sykes (28) | Young (6) | Clarendon (5) | AT&T Center; 6,953 | 10-18 |
| 29 | August 15 | Connecticut | L 75-96 | Sykes (23) | Lyttle (9) | Clarendon (11) | McCamish Pavilion; 4,585 | 10-19 |
| 30 | August 19 | Dallas | L 86-90 | Hayes (22) | Tied (7) | Ajavon (4) | College Park Center; 4,962 | 10-20 |
| 31 | August 23 | Seattle | W 89-83 | Lyttle (18) | Lyttle (8) | Clarendon (14) | McCamish Pavilion; 4,878 | 11-20 |
| 32 | August 26 | Indiana | W 79-74 | Hayes (24) | Williams (15) | Tied (4) | McCamish Pavilion; 5,029 | 12-20 |

September: 0–2 (Home: 0–0; Road: 0–2)

| Game | Date | Opponent | Score | High points | High rebounds | High assists | Location/Attendance | Record |
|---|---|---|---|---|---|---|---|---|
| 33 | September 1 | Los Angeles | L 56-81 | Hayes (19) | Williams (6) | Clarendon (2) | Staples Center; 12,163 | 12-21 |
| 34 | September 3 | Phoenix | L 70-84 | Sykes (33) | Tied (5) | Tied (2) | Talking Stick Resort Arena; 11,222 | 12-22 |

2017 season schedule

== Standings ==
| # | Eastern Conference | W | L | PCT | GB | Home | Road | Conf. |
|---|---|---|---|---|---|---|---|---|
| 1 | New York Liberty - (3) | 22 | 12 | .647 | - | 13–4 | 9–8 | 10–6 |
| 2 | Connecticut Sun - (4) | 21 | 13 | .636 | 1 | 12–5 | 9–6 | 10–6 |
| 3 | Washington Mystics - (6) | 18 | 16 | .529 | 4 | 11–6 | 7–10 | 12-4 |
| 4 | Chicago Sky - e | 12 | 22 | .353 | 10 | 4–13 | 8–9 | 6–10 |
| 5 | Atlanta Dream - e | 12 | 22 | .353 | 10 | 9–8 | 3–14 | 5–11 |
| 6 | Indiana Fever - e | 9 | 25 | .265 | 13 | 6–11 | 3–14 | 4–12 |

Notes

(#) – Conference Standing
Playoff Seeds shown next to team name
e – Eliminated from playoffs

== Statistics ==
Legend
| GP | Games played | GS | Games started | MPG | Minutes per game | RPG | Rebounds per game |
| APG | Assists per game | SPG | Steals per game | BPG | Blocks per game | PPG | Points per game |
| FG% | Field-goal percentage | 3P% | 3-point field-goal percentage | FT% | Free-throw percentage | TO | Turnovers per game |
| PF | Fouls per game | | Team leader | | League leader |

=== Regular season ===
| Player | GP | GS | MPG | FG% | 3P% | FT% | RPG | APG | SPG | BPG | PPG |
|---|---|---|---|---|---|---|---|---|---|---|---|
| Tiffany Hayes | 33 | 33 | 30.0 | 43.6 | 37.2 | 85.4 | 3.8 | 2.4 | 1.2 | 0.2 | 16.3 |
| Brittney Sykes | 34 | 23 | 25.4 | 40.8 | 33.6 | 72.9 | 4.1 | 1.9 | 0.6 | 0.5 | 13.9 |
| Layshia Clarendon | 34 | 33 | 29.9 | 40.8 | 33.6 | 87.9 | 3.8 | 6.6 | 0.9 | 0.1 | 10.7 |
| Elizabeth Williams | 34 | 34 | 31.4 | 48.7 | 0.0 | 65.9 | 7.2 | 1.4 | 1.1 | 2.0 | 10.4 |
| Bria Holmes | 32 | 13 | 22.2 | 37.8 | 18.9 | 64.0 | 2.9 | 1.8 | 0.7 | 0.2 | 7.8 |
| Damiris Dantas | 34 | 2 | 18.1 | 39.2 | 26.5 | 76.7 | 3.6 | 0.7 | 0.5 | 0.6 | 7.7 |
| Sancho Lyttle | 29 | 28 | 28.3 | 43.5 | 25.0 | 75.9 | 7.1 | 1.6 | 1.6 | 0.6 | 6.4 |
| Tamera Young | 11 | 1 | 15.2 | 31.0 | 33.3 | 61.5 | 2.3 | 0.7 | 0.3 | 0.5 | 4.3 |
| Jordan Hooper | 15 | 0 | 6.8 | 40.0 | 42.9 | 75.0 | 0.9 | 0.2 | 0.3 | 0.0 | 3.1 |
| Imani Boyette | 10 | 0 | 9.0 | 54.2 | 0.0 | 50.0 | 2.9 | 0.2 | 0.1 | 0.7 | 2.9 |
| Matee Ajavon | 31 | 2 | 8.1 | 28.9 | 0.0 | 79.5 | 1.2 | 1.0 | 0.4 | 0.0 | 2.4 |
| Aneika Henry-Morello | 6 | 0 | 5.2 | 85.7 | 0.0 | 0.0 | 1.0 | 0.3 | 0.3 | 0.0 | 2.0 |
| Meighan Simmons | 11 | 0 | 3.8 | 25.0 | 14.3 | 71.4 | 0.5 | 0.1 | 0.0 | 0.1 | 1.7 |
| Brianna Kiesel | 9 | 0 | 8.3 | 20.0 | 11.1 | 70.0 | 0.4 | 0.1 | 0.3 | 0.1 | 1.6 |
| Rachel Hollivay | 7 | 1 | 4.9 | 66.7 | 0.0 | 50.0 | 1.3 | 0.0 | 0.0 | 0.3 | 1.3 |
| Darxis Morris | 5 | 0 | 4.2 | 33.3 | 100.0 | 0.0 | 0.6 | 0.2 | 0.0 | 0.0 | 1.0 |
| Chelsea Hopkins | 2 | 0 | 4.0 | 0.0 | 0.0 | 0.0 | 0.0 | 0.0 | 0.0 | 0.0 | 0.0 |

== Awards and honors ==
| Recipient | Award | Date awarded | Ref. |
|---|---|---|---|
| Layshia Clarendon | Eastern Conference Player of the Week | May 22 | |
| Tiffany Hayes | Eastern Conference Player of the Week | June 2 | |
| Brittney Sykes | Rookie of the Month Award - July | August 1 | |
| Brittney Sykes | Rookie of the Month Award - August | September 5 | |
