= Camille Little =

American basketball player (born 1985)

Camille Smith
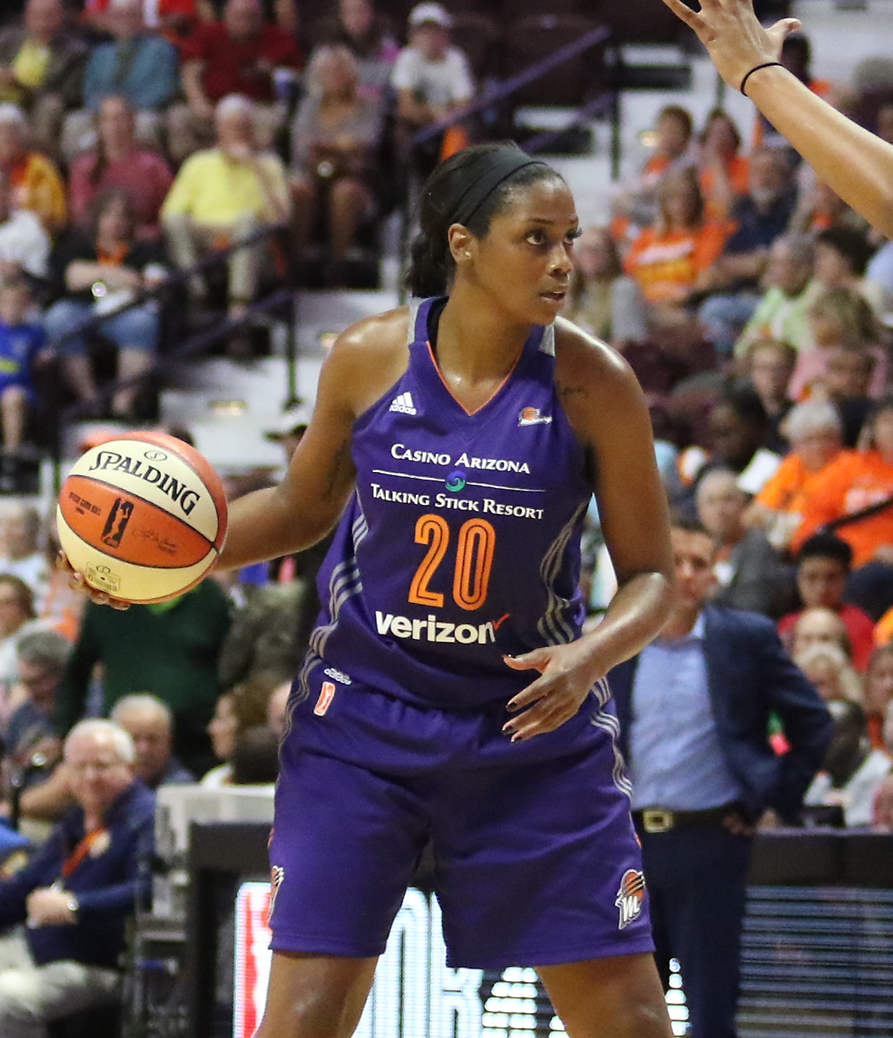

Dallas Wings
- Title: Assistant coach
- League: WNBA

Personal information
- Born: January 18, 1985 (age 41) Winston-Salem, North Carolina, U.S.
- Listed height: 6 ft 2 in (1.88 m)
- Listed weight: 180 lb (82 kg)

Career information
- High school: Carver (Winston-Salem, North Carolina)
- College: North Carolina (2003–2007)
- WNBA draft: 2007: 2nd round, 17th overall pick
- Drafted by: San Antonio Silver Stars
- Playing career: 2007–2019
- Position: Power forward
- Number: 2, 20
- Coaching career: 2020–present

Career history

Playing
- 2007: San Antonio Silver Stars
- 2008: Atlanta Dream
- 2008–2014: Seattle Storm
- 2015–2016: Connecticut Sun
- 2017–2019: Phoenix Mercury

Coaching
- 2020: Dallas Wings (Player development)
- 2022–present: Paul Quinn College
- 2024: Los Angeles Sparks (assistant)
- 2025–present: Dallas Wings (assistant)

Career highlights
- WNBA champion (2010); WNBA All-Rookie Team (2007); ACC All-Defensive team (2007); First-team All-ACC (2004); ACC Rookie of the Year (2004); ACC All-Freshman Team (2004); McDonald's All-American (2003); North Carolina Miss Basketball (2003)
- Stats at WNBA.com
- Stats at Basketball Reference

Camille Smith (née Little; born January 18, 1985) is an American professional basketball coach and former player. She is currently an assistant coach for the Dallas Wings of the Women's National Basketball Association (WNBA) and the head coach for the Paul Quinn College women’s basketball program. She played college basketball for the North Carolina Tar Heels. Smith was selected 17th overall by the San Antonio Silver Stars in the 2007 WNBA draft and played in the league for 13 seasons with the Silver Stars, Atlanta Dream, Seattle Storm, Connecticut Sun, and Phoenix Mercury.

Smith started her coaching career in 2020 as a player development coach for the Dallas Wings in the WNBA. In 2022, she became the head coach of the Paul Quinn College women’s basketball program. She has combined that role with assistant coach duties with the Los Angeles Sparks and, currently, the Dallas Wings again.

== Early life ==
Born in Winston-Salem, North Carolina, Smith played for Carver High School. While at Carver, she helped the women's basketball team win the 2001 NCHSAA 3A state championship, finishing that season with a 30–0 record. She was also named a WBCA All-American. In the 2003 WBCA High School All-America Game, she scored ten points.

== College career ==
Known for her offensive skills and defensive game, Smith and fellow All-American Ivory Latta led the North Carolina Tar Heels to two Final Four appearances in her four years at North Carolina. Smith was voted the 2004 ACC Freshman of The Year and was named to the 2007 ACC All-Defensive Team. In her career at UNC, she has scored 1,773 points and averaged 12.8 points per game with 5.9 rebounds per game. Smith was a McDonald's All-American in high school (2003).

=== College statistics ===
Legend
GP	Games played	GS	Games started	MPG	Minutes per game
FG%	Field goal percentage	3P%	3-point field goal percentage	FT%	Free throw percentage
RPG	Rebounds per game	APG	Assists per game	SPG	Steals per game
BPG	Blocks per game	PPG	Points per game	**Bold**	Career high

Year	Team	GP	Points	FG%	3P%	FT%	RPG	APG	SPG	BPG	PPG
2003–04	North Carolina	31	442	**51.2**	32.7	**74.0**	**7.9**	1.1	1.3	0.4	**14.3**
2004–05	North Carolina	34	401	44.9	**43.3**	68.2	5.9	1.6	2.1	**0.5**	11.8
2005–06	North Carolina	35	408	45.4	38.0	66.1	5.5	2.1	1.9	0.4	11.7
2006–07	North Carolina	**38**	**522**	48.3	31.0	69.0	5.9	**2.7**	**2.6**	0.3	13.7
Career	North Carolina	138	1773	47.5	36.0	69.4	6.3	1.9	2.0	0.4	12.8

== Professional career ==
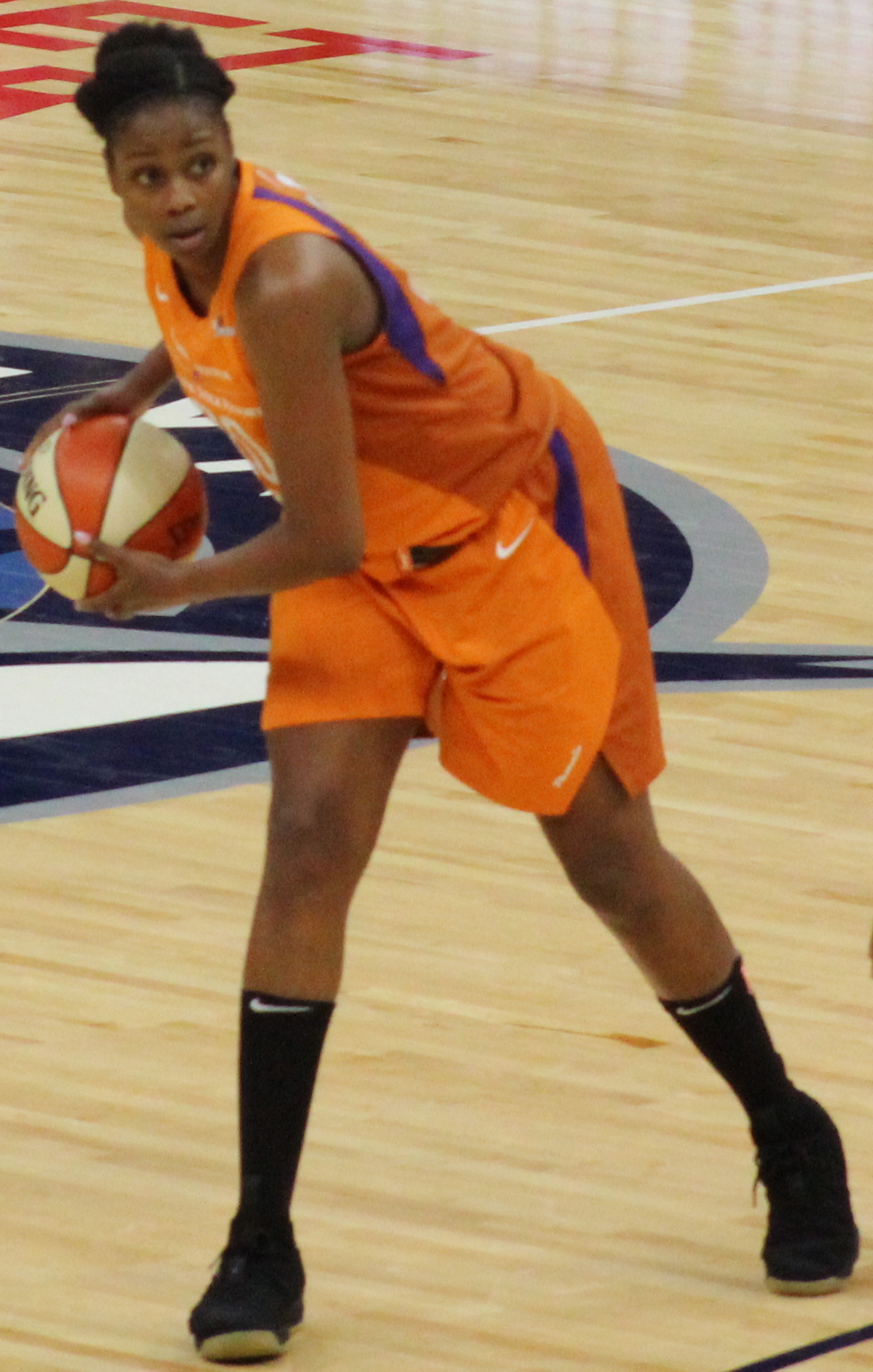
Smith in 2018

Smith was selected 17th overall by the San Antonio Silver Stars in the 2007 WNBA draft. Dan Hughes, the Silver Stars' coach and general manager, was surprised she was still available: "No mock-draft scenario we put together had us able to get Camille in the second round."

On April 9, 2008 Smith was traded along with Chioma Nnamaka and the first round pick of the 2009 WNBA draft to the Atlanta Dream for Ann Wauters, Morenike Atunrase, and the second round pick of the 2009 WNBA draft. On June 22, 2008 Smith was traded to the Seattle Storm for a second round pick of the 2009 WNBA Draft. Smith helped the Storm win their second championship in 2010.

On January 28, 2015 Smith was traded along with Shekinna Stricklen to the Connecticut Sun for Renee Montgomery, and the third and fifteen overall pick of the 2015 WNBA draft.

In 2017, Smith was traded to the Phoenix Mercury along with teammate Jillian Alleyne in a three-team deal that sent Candice Dupree to the Indiana Fever along with the Mercury's 2017 first round pick and the Connecticut Sun receiving the 8th overall pick in the 2017 WNBA draft along with Lynetta Kizer from the Fever.

Smith retired from the WNBA after the 2019 season.

== Coaching career ==
In November 2019, Smith became the Player Development Coach for the Dallas Wings.

In March 2022, Smith was announced as the head coach of the Paul Quinn College women’s basketball program.

In March 2024, Smith was announced as an assistant coach for the Los Angeles Sparks, under head coach Curt Miller.

In January 2025, Smith returned to the Dallas Wings as an assistant coach under head coach Chris Koclanes.

== WNBA career statistics ==
Legend
GP	Games played	GS	Games started	MPG	Minutes per game	RPG	Rebounds per game
APG	Assists per game	SPG	Steals per game	BPG	Blocks per game	PPG	Points per game
TO	Turnovers per game	FG%	Field-goal percentage	3P%	3-point field-goal percentage	FT%	Free-throw percentage
**Bold**	Career best	°	League leader

=== Regular season ===
Year	Team	GP	GS	MPG	FG%	3P%	FT%	RPG	APG	SPG	BPG	TO	PPG
2007	San Antonio	**34**	7	20.9	.412	.273	.525	4.5	0.7	0.9	0.3	1.2	3.9
2008	Atlanta	13	2	17.0	.420	**.400**	.593	3.1	0.7	0.8	0.5	1.4	4.8
2008	Seattle	19	13	23.3	**.532**	.333	.667	4.4	1.4	0.9	0.3	2.2	9.7
2009	Seattle	**34**	**34**	30.7	.471	.259	.683	**6.5**	1.0	1.1	0.4	2.0	10.0
2010	Seattle	**34**	**34**	24.6	.500	.348	.711	5.2	1.4	**1.6**	0.6	1.8	10.1
2011	Seattle	33	33	26.9	.464	.227	.663	5.2	1.6	1.4	**0.7**	2.3	9.6
2012	Seattle	**34**	**34**	27.9	.474	.333	.739	5.1	1.9	0.7	0.5	2.7	11.3
2013	Seattle	**34**	**34**	30.3	.437	.283	.803	4.7	1.4	1.2	0.3	2.4	10.9
2014	Seattle	33	33	**30.8**	.448	.338	.797	4.3	1.6	1.0	0.4	2.4	**12.9**
2015	Connecticut	**34**	**34**	27.0	.406	**.345**	.879	3.6	1.6	1.2	0.2	1.7	8.2
2016	Connecticut	33	29	24.6	.384	.322	.632	3.0	**2.0**	1.2	0.3	1.7	7.8
2017	Phoenix	**34**	**34**	25.4	.419	.224	.607	3.8	1.4	0.9	0.4	1.6	7.1
2018	Phoenix	33	7	16.2	.330	.258	.774	1.8	1.2	0.5	0.3	**0.9**	3.0
2019	Phoenix	29	0	14.7	.435	.333	.806	2.4	0.8	0.4	0.3	**0.9**	3.9
Career	13 years, 5 teams	431	328	24.8	.444	.309	.719	4.2	1.4	1.0	0.4	1.8	8.2

=== Postseason ===
Year	Team	GP	GS	MPG	FG%	3P%	FT%	RPG	APG	SPG	BPG	TO	PPG
2007	San Antonio	5	0	17.4	.429	.000	.500	2.2	0.8	0.4	**1.2**	0.8	3.6
2008	Seattle	3	3	**35.0**	.333	**.500**	.833	3.3	0.3	1.0	0.0	3.3	11.7
2009	Seattle	3	3	34.0	.400	.167	**1.000**	3.3	1.0	0.7	0.7	1.3	7.7
2010	Seattle	**7**	**7**	28.7	.508	.200	.667	**6.9**	1.4	1.1	0.3	1.9	11.3
2011	Seattle	3	3	23.3	.458	.000	.842	6.0	2.3	0.7	0.0	3.3	**12.7**
2012	Seattle	3	3	26.7	.500	**.500**	.563	4.3	1.3	1.7	0.0	2.3	12.0
2013	Seattle	2	2	34.0	.368	.400	.818	3.5	1.0	**2.0**	0.5	3.0	12.5
2017	Phoenix	5	5	31.6	**.571**	**.500**	.800	6.8	1.4	0.6	0.4	1.8	6.0
2018	Phoenix	5	0	12.4	.300	.000	.500	2.8	0.6	0.2	0.0	**0.4**	1.4
2019	Phoenix	1	0	22.0	.400	.000	**1.000**	5.0	**3.0**	1.0	0.0	1.0	10.0
Career	10 years, 3 teams	37	26	25.8	.447	.310	.719	4.6	1.2	0.8	0.4	1.8	8.1

== Personal life ==
Smith is married to Jeremis Smith, a construction business owner and former professional basketball player, who played for the Georgia Tech Yellow Jackets and later internationally.

Smith is a Christian. She has spoken about her faith saying, "It’s not about the talent I have but about the gifts God has given me to use for His glory. Basketball accomplishments are great, but they can’t compare to my relationship with God."

According to ESPN The Magazine, Smith enjoys the television show SpongeBob SquarePants.
