= Courtney Williams =

American basketball player (born 1994)

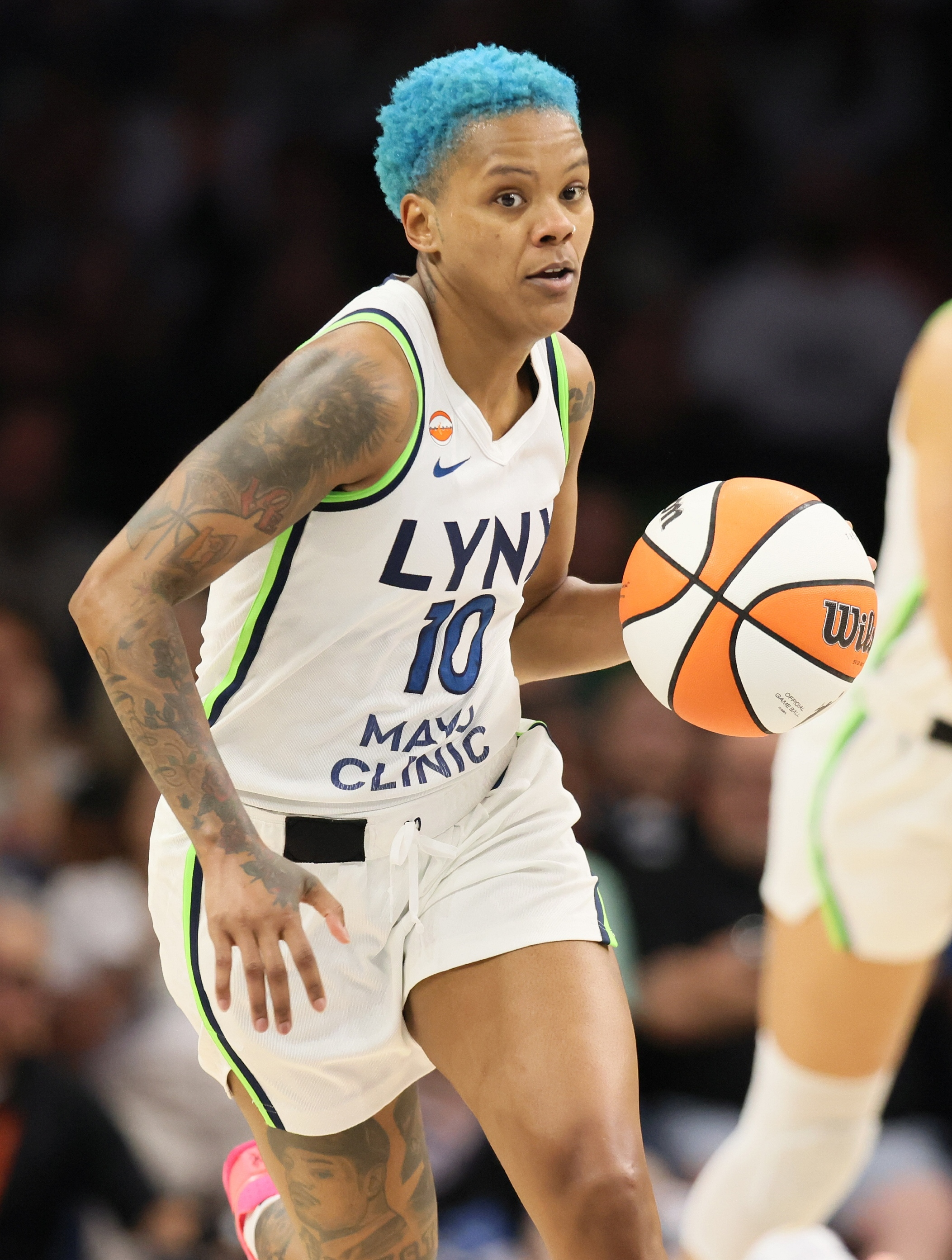
- Williams with the Minnesota Lynx in 2026

No. 10 – Minnesota Lynx
- Position: Shooting guard
- League: WNBA

Personal information
- Born: May 11, 1994 (age 32) Folkston, Georgia, U.S.
- Listed height: 5 ft 8 in (1.73 m)
- Listed weight: 147 lb (67 kg)

Career information
- High school: Charlton County (Folkston, Georgia)
- College: South Florida (2012–2016)
- WNBA draft: 2016: 1st round, 8th overall pick
- Drafted by: Phoenix Mercury
- Playing career: 2016–present

Career history
- 2016: Phoenix Mercury
- 2016–2019: Connecticut Sun
- 2017–2018: Perth Lynx
- 2020–2021: Atlanta Dream
- 2021: Elitzur Ramla
- 2022: Connecticut Sun
- 2023: Chicago Sky
- 2023: Shaanxi Red Wolves
- 2024–present: Minnesota Lynx
- 2025: Lunar Owls BC
- 2026–present: Vinyl BC

Career highlights
- WNBA Commissioner's Cup Champion (2024); 3× WNBA All-Star (2021, 2025, 2026); WBCA Coaches' All-American (2016); McDonalds All-American (2012)
- Stats at Basketball Reference
Medals
Women’s basketball
Representing United States
2015 Summer Universiade
Gold medal – first place	2015 Gwangju	Team
Pan American Games
Silver medal – second place	2015 Toronto	Team

Courtney Monae Williams (born May 11, 1994) is an American professional basketball player for the Minnesota Lynx of the Women's National Basketball Association (WNBA) and for the Vinyl of Unrivaled. Williams completed her high school basketball career at Charlton County High School. She signed with the University of South Florida and enrolled at the school in the fall of 2012.

== Early life ==
Williams grew up in Folkston, Georgia, a town with under 5,000 people. In her childhood she slept with a basketball and said she wanted to play in the WNBA. Her father said that she "didn’t play with dolls or any of that growing up. She was jumping on my dirt bike, riding four-wheelers. Mostly, though, she was hanging with the fellas out there on the court banging and balling.”

She played basketball for the Maidens at Charlton County High School. Her mother Michelle Williams (then Michelle Granger) also played basketball for the same high school 22 years earlier. Michelle set the single-game scoring record when she scored 40 points. In her junior season, Williams took over the record by scoring 42 points in a game. She later broke her own record by scoring 44 points in a game. Williams credits her father, Donald Williams, with challenging her athletically too. Her father advised her to develop her midrange because of her smaller size in high school. "My daddy told me to get a little middy so I wouldn’t get hurt,” [Williams] said with a laugh. “It kind of became my identity.” Her father also wouldn't let her play basketball for her high school during her sophomore year as punishment for sneaking out of the house to spend time with someone he thought was trouble. Her mother let her continue to play AAU basketball that year. In her senior year, she led her team to the state semifinals. In the quarterfinals she scored 47 points. She was named to the first team for all state in Georgia but was left off the senior all-star game.

== College career ==
Williams was a solid role player coming off the bench in her first season with the South Florida Bulls. She appeared in every game and started in 3. She averaged 7.4 points, 3.4 rebounds and .88 assists over 33 games.

In William's sophomore year she averaged 30.4 minutes a game compared to her 15.3 coming off the bench the season before. She finished the year with 16.3 points a game along with 7.5 rebounds and 2.4 assists. She was named All-Conference First team and was an Honorable Mention for the All-American team.

She was a starter in every game her junior season and averaged 20.3 points per game which led the AAC. Overall she was the ninth leading scorer in the country with 20 or more points in 20 different games. During one stretch of 10 game she scored over 20 points in each game which is the longest streak in the nation at the time.

In her senior year Williams hit 308 field goals which was second in the nation among all Division I teams. She scored 763 points which was eighth best among all Division I players.

Williams was inducted into the University of South Florida Athletic Hall of Fame in 2019 and her number 10 jersey is retired by the team. University of Connecticut head coach Geno Auriemma said of Williams, "She was just a really difficult match up for anybody and I don’t think there’s anybody in college who really had an answer for her on a regular basis."

== Professional career ==
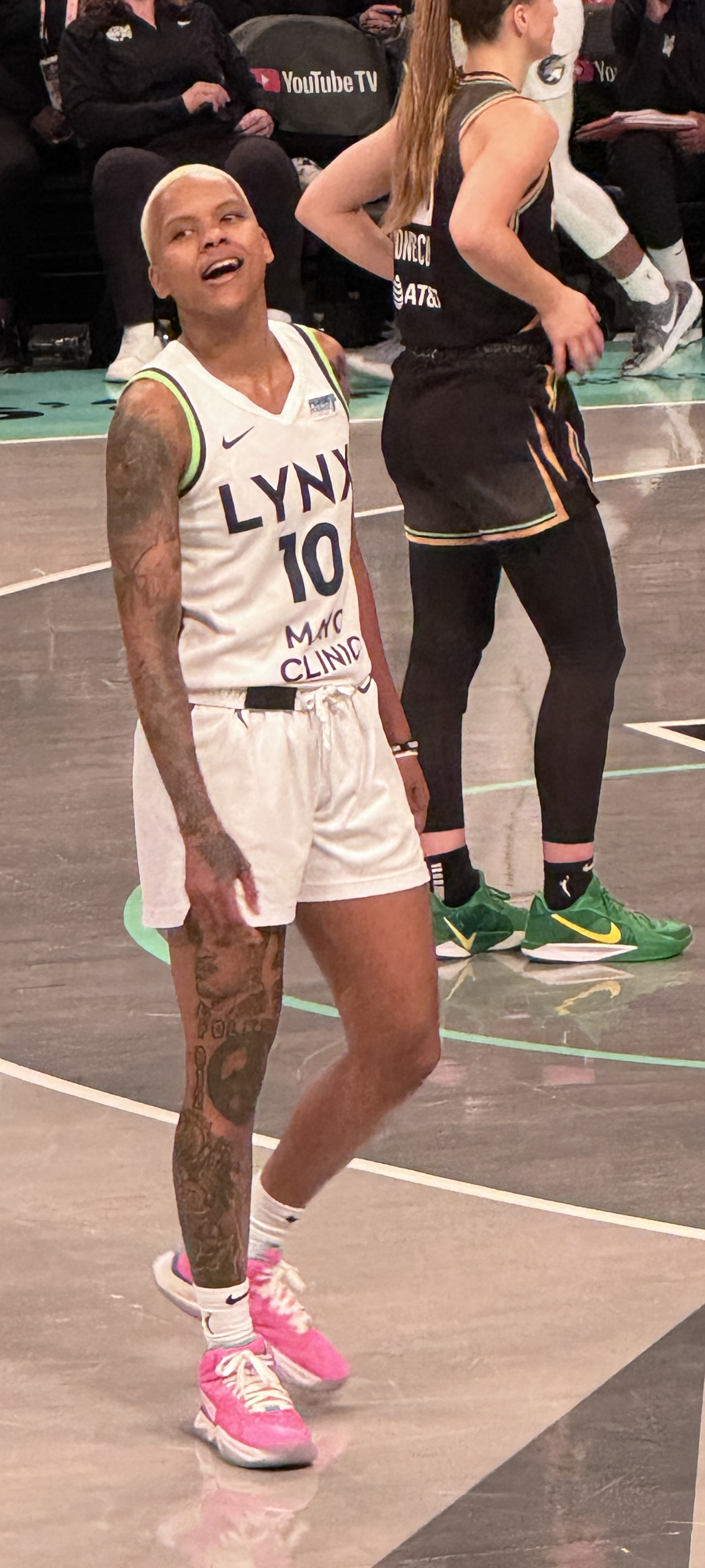
Williams playing for the Minnesota Lynx during the 2024 WNBA Finals

=== WNBA ===
==== Phoenix Mercury ====
Williams was selected as the eighth overall pick by the Phoenix Mercury in the 2016 WNBA draft. She was surprised by the selection since she didn't have many pre draft discussions with the Mercury. Williams has identified Diana Taurasi as a player who “I look up to and who I compare my mentality to”, and now she will be playing on the same team as Taurasi. After appearing in a handful of games for the Mercury, Williams was traded to the Connecticut Sun on June 26, 2016.

==== Connecticut Sun (2016–2019) ====
Geno Auriemma encouraged the Sun coach Curt Miller to give Williams a chance as a player who could go out and get points; "There’s nobody that I know that can stop her from doing that.’” Williams helped the Sun reach the WNBA Finals during the 2019 season, before they ultimately lost to the Washington Mystics. During the 2019 season, Williams was also honored by the league with a Player of the Week nod.

==== Atlanta Dream (2020–2021) ====
On February 19, 2020, Williams was traded to the Atlanta Dream as part of a three-team trade. Williams went on to earn her first All-Star appearance with the Dream in 2021.

In October 2021, Williams (along with teammate Crystal Bradford) was released from her contract after a video of them circulated through various media outlets of their involvement in a fight outside of an Atlanta area food truck.

==== Connecticut Sun (2022) ====
The Connecticut Sun re-signed Williams for the 2022 WNBA season.

==== Chicago Sky (2023) ====
On February 4, 2023, the Chicago Sky announced the signing of Williams. The terms of the agreement were not disclosed, per team policy. The Sky asked Williams to switch to playing point guard. Although she was reluctant to begin with, she finished the season fourth in the league in assists per game. Williams said the position switch "felt like a whole new world opened up for me."

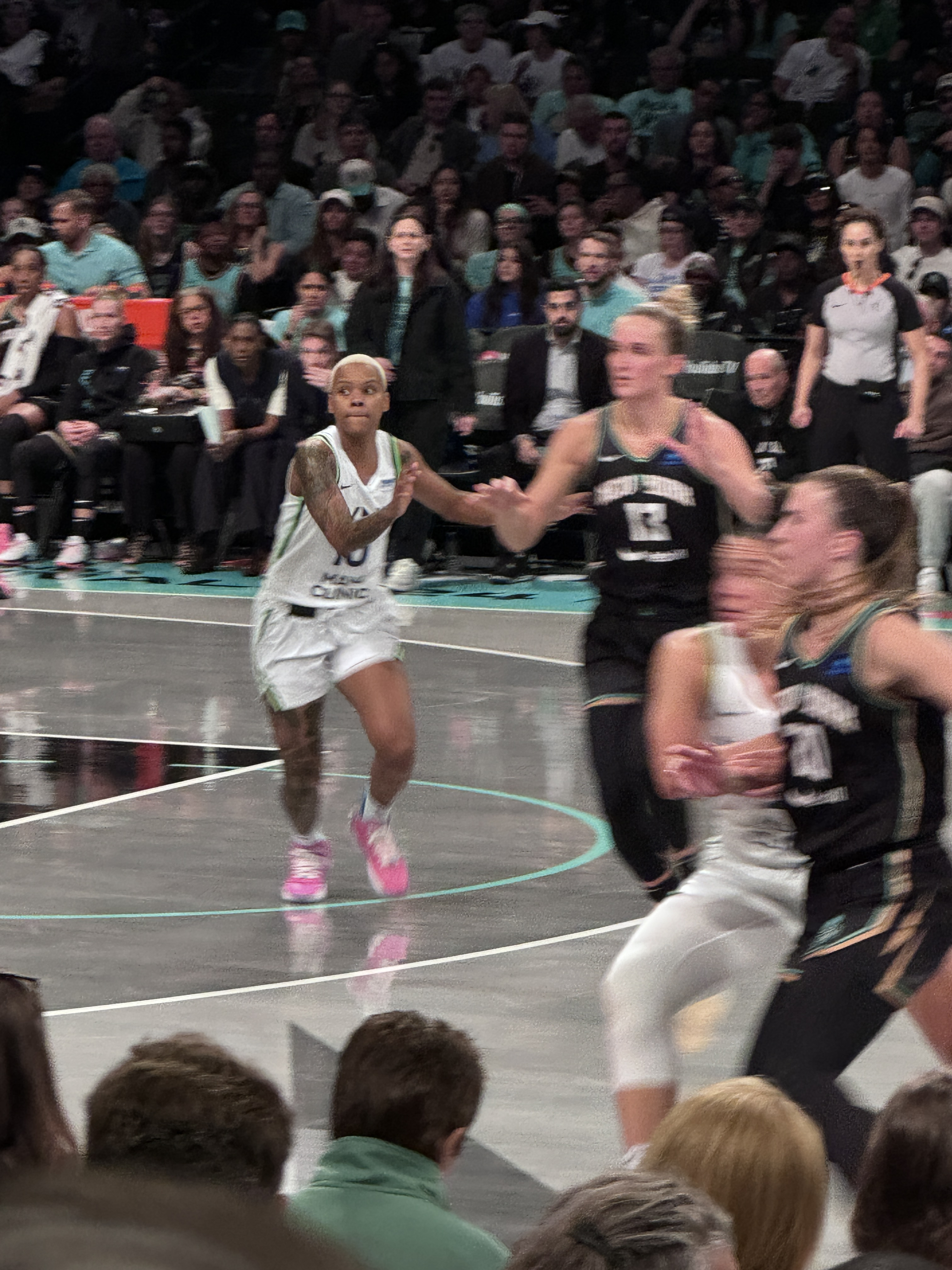
Williams guards Leonie Fiebich during game 2 of the 2024 WNBA finals

==== Minnesota Lynx (2024–present) ====
On January 31, 2024, Williams signed a two-year guaranteed deal with the Minnesota Lynx. In free agency she expressed a desire for stability in playing for a team longer term. Williams ruptured a right thumb ligament in training camp and played through it until the Olympic break allowed enough healing time. In the June 14, 2024, Lynx home game against the Sparks, Williams became only the 4th WNBA player to have 15+ points, 10+ assists, 8+ rebounds, and 4+ steals. After the October 4, 2024, semifinals Lynx win over the Connecticut Sun, Cheryl Reeve said that Williams's "way with this team is exactly what was missing from our team last year. The toughness, the swag, the dog, and all of those things, the belief. But not just in her ability to score the ball, but also her ability to play make to make our team better." Reeve has had Williams playing the point guard position, a new role for Williams that started with her play for the Chicago Sky. Williams' trash talk was noted in the semifinals against the Sun, but she says her style is to remain light. Williams is known for her midrange shooting; she leads the WNBA in midrange attempts with 6.9 per game, while shooting 46.2%. In the 2024 season, 57.5% of her points were made in the midrange. In the October 8, 2024, game 5 semifinals Lynx win against the Connecticut Sun, Williams "had her most points in a playoff game since 2019" with 24 points; she also had seven assists, five rebounds, and two steals.

Williams's four-point play with 5.5 seconds remaining

In Game 1 of the finals against the New York Liberty on October 10, 2024, Williams became only the second in Lynx franchise history to have 20+ points, 5+ rebounds, and 5+ assists in back-to-back playoffs games. Maya Moore had been the only Lynx player to do that before Williams. Williams played a clutch role for the team in their historic comeback win by scoring 8 of the last 10 points in regulation and 5 of the last 7 in overtime. Her four-point play with 5.5 seconds left in the game gave the Lynx their first lead.

=== International play ===
On August 10, 2017, Williams signed with the Perth Lynx for the 2017–18 WNBL season. Williams was named to the WNBL Team of the Week on 14 November 2017, after a 26-point performance against the University of Canberra Capitals. The following week, Williams was named WNBL Player of the Week, after tallying 37 points, 15 rebounds and 13 assists across a pair of victories. Williams was a key contributor in the Perth Lynx's historic 14 game winning streak, resulting in the team finishing the regular season on top of the ladder. Williams finished the WNBL regular season averaging 21.7 PPG, 6.5 RPG, 4.1 APG, 2.25 STPG and 0.9 BLKPG.

=== Athletes Unlimited ===
Williams played for Athletes Unlimited in the 2022 season.

=== Unrivaled ===
On October 9, 2024, Unrivaled announced that Williams would play in the inaugural 2025 season for the new league. She was selected for Lunar Owls.

On November 5, 2025, it was announced that Williams had been drafted by Vinyl BC for the 2026 Unrivaled season.

== National team career ==
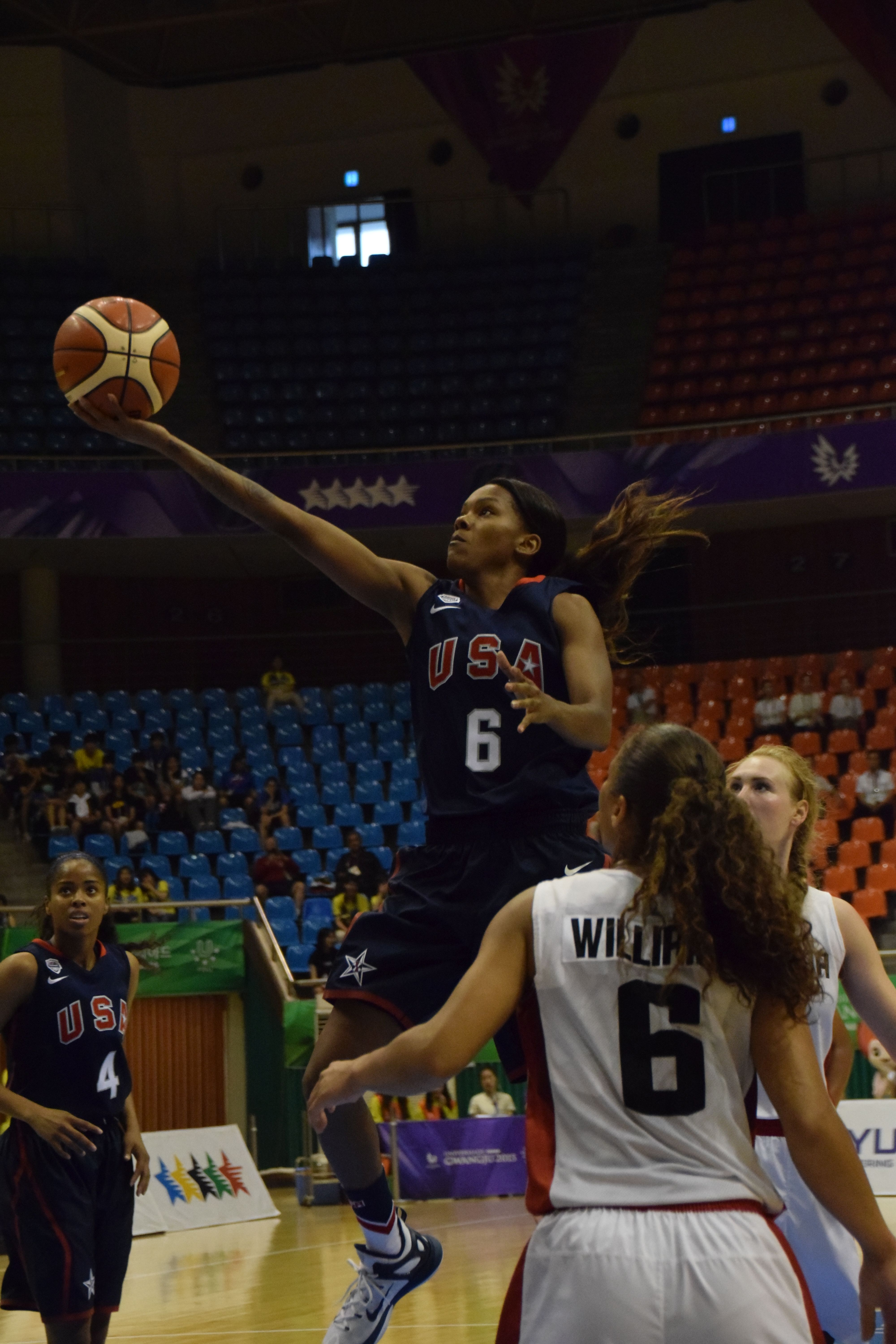
Williams in the World University gold medal game against Canada

Williams was selected as one of 12 players to play for the US at the 2015 World University games, held in Gwangju, South Korea in July 2015. The USA team opened with a win over Italy. In the second game against China, Williams was the leading scorer with 18 points. The USA team won the next two points to earn a berth in the semifinal against Japan. The USA team was down by 15 points, but came back to tie the game up and send the game into overtime. The teams matched scores in the first overtime and went into double overtime for the first time in World University Games history. With 10 seconds left in the second overtime, Japan cut the lead to two points but Williams hit two free throws to secure the victory. Williams recorded a double double, scoring 17 points and securing 10 rebounds. The gold-medal game was against Canada. The USA won the gold-medal 82–63 with Williams again contributing a double double, with 15 points and 10 rebounds.

Williams was selected for the 2017–2020 USA Women's Basketball National Team pool and participated in National Team training camp in 2022 as well.

== Career statistics ==
Legend
GP	Games played	GS	Games started	MPG	Minutes per game	RPG	Rebounds per game
APG	Assists per game	SPG	Steals per game	BPG	Blocks per game	PPG	Points per game
TO	Turnovers per game	FG%	Field-goal percentage	3P%	3-point field-goal percentage	FT%	Free-throw percentage
**Bold**	Career best	°	League leader

=== WNBA ===
==== Regular season ====
Stats current as of game on July 12, 2025

WNBA regular season statistics
Year	Team	GP	GS	MPG	FG%	3P%	FT%	RPG	APG	SPG	BPG	TO	PPG
2016	Phoenix	6	0	4.2	.111	.000	.500	1.2	0.3	0.0	0.0	**0.3**	0.5
2016	Connecticut	19	0	17.2	.427	.308	.579	3.6	1.5	0.6	0.2	1.0	8.1
2017	Connecticut	34	28	26.0	**.473**	.324	**.878**	4.2	2.1	0.5	0.2	1.4	12.3
2018	Connecticut	30	29	27.1	.456	.377	.680	5.9	3.0	0.8	0.1	1.8	12.6
2019	Connecticut	34	34	29.1	.435	**.457**	.800	5.6	3.8	**1.4**	0.4	1.6	13.2
2020	Atlanta	20	14	30.8	.436	.235	.696	**7.2**	3.2	0.7	0.1	2.7	14.6
2021	Atlanta	32	32	**34.4**	.418	.382	.642	6.8	4.0	1.1	**0.5**	1.8	**16.5**
2022	Connecticut	34	34	27.9	.426	.338	.750	4.6	3.3	1.0	0.4	1.7	11.1
2023	Chicago	**40**	**40**	30.1	.437	.443	.600	6.0	**6.3**	1.0	0.3	2.5	10.4
2024	Minnesota	**40**	**40**	26.5	.443	.333	.810	4.7	5.5	0.9	0.4	2.5	11.1
2025	Minnesota	22	22	28.1	.427	.376	.821	5.0	6.0	1.5	0.2	2.5	14.0
**Career**	10 years, 5 teams	311	273	27.6	.437	.370	.743	5.3	3.9	0.9	0.3	1.9	12.1
**Career**	All-Star	2	0	17.8	.706	.750	.500	1.5	3.5	0.5	0.5	0.5	14.0

==== Playoffs ====
WNBA playoff statistics
Year	Team	GP	GS	MPG	FG%	3P%	FT%	RPG	APG	SPG	BPG	TO	PPG
2017	Connecticut	1	1	31.0	.455	.000	.000	6.0	2.0	1.0	**1.0**	3.0	10.0
2018	Connecticut	1	1	33.0	**.478**	**.800**	.333	**8.0**	3.0	0.0	0.0	**1.0**	**27.0**
2019	Connecticut	8	8	**34.4**	.428	.414	**.813**	5.8	4.4	0.9	0.1	1.8	17.9
2022	Connecticut	**12**	**12**	27.1	.415	.318	.667	3.9	2.3	0.6	0.5	1.4	10.3
2023	Chicago	2	2	32.5	.316	.286	.000	**8.0**	4.0	0.5	**1.0**	3.5	7.0
2024	Minnesota	**12**	**12**	29.4	.415	.444	.913	4.1	5.9	1.2	0.3	3.1	13.8
2025	Minnesota	6	6	32.5	.442	.273	.800	5.3	**6.0**	**2.7**	0.2	2.8	15.7
**Career**	7 years, 3 teams	42	42	30.4	.422	.381	.811	4.9	4.4	1.1	0.3	2.3	13.7

=== College ===
Year	Team	GP	Points	FG%	3P%	FT%	RPG	APG	SPG	BPG	PPG
2012–13	South Florida	33	245	41.9	32.4	72.5	3.4	0.9	0.8	0.4	7.4
2013–14	South Florida	**36**	586	**43.8**	27.4	76.7	7.5	2.4	1.0	0.5	16.3
2014–15	South Florida	35	710	42.0	36.9	**78.9**	7.5	**3.3**	**1.6**	0.9	20.3
2015–16	South Florida	34	**763**	42.6	**38.2**	69.7	**8.4**	2.6	1.3	0.9	**22.4**
Career	South Florida	138	2304	42.6	35.3	74.6	6.7	2.3	1.2	0.7	16.7

== Personal life ==
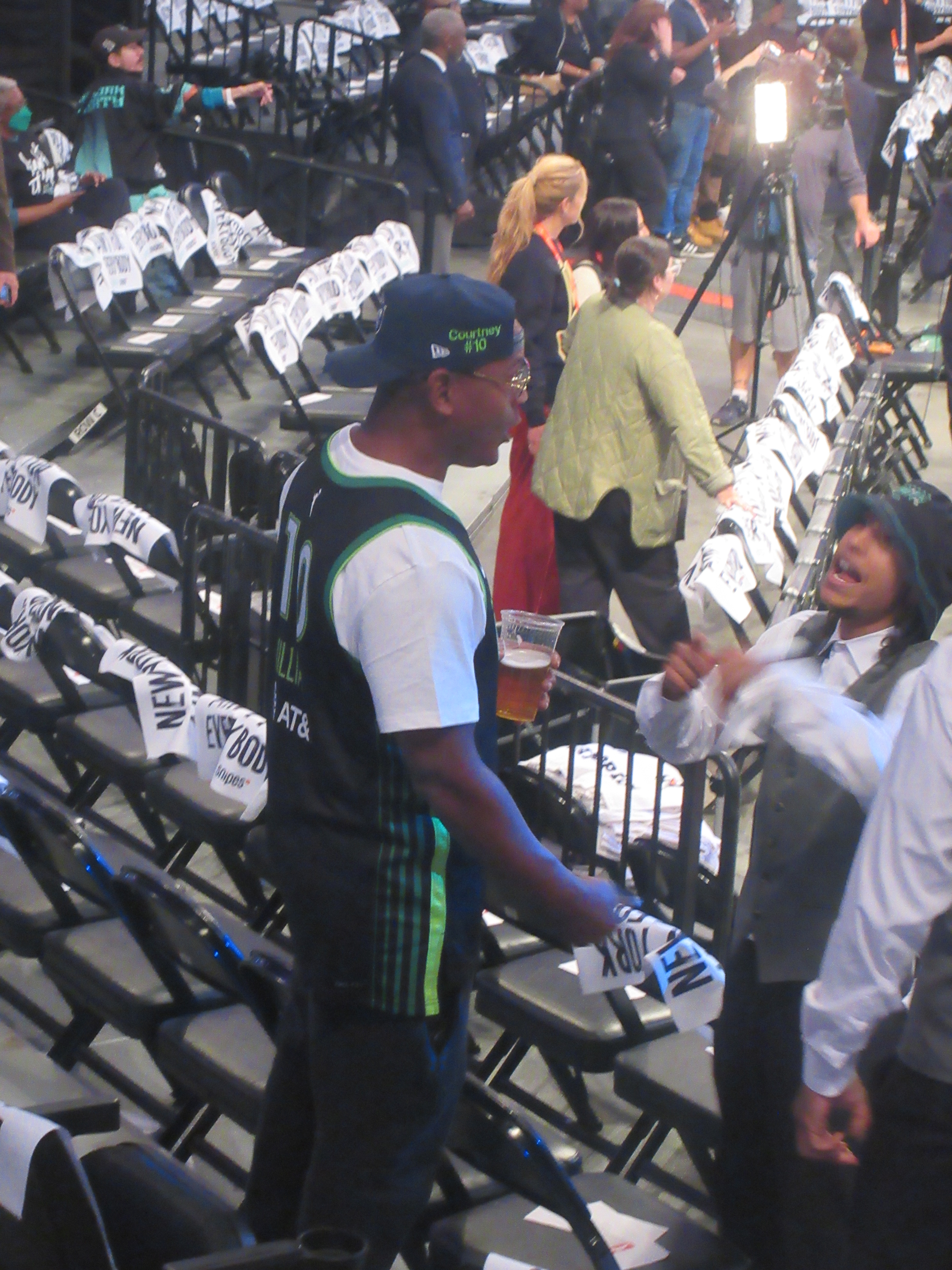
Courtney's father Donald at Game 1 of the 2024 WNBA Finals

Williams is the daughter of Michele and Donald Williams, and has one sister, Doniece. Her father is a visible supporter when in attendance at her games, dancing, cheering, and high fiving fans. He describes watching his daughter play well in the postseason as "euphoria," and Williams credits her father with "always instilling confidence in me. ... I try to put on a show for him."

Outside of playing basketball, she does day and night trading. She has an American bulldog.

Williams is openly lesbian, and her relationship with real estate broker N'Shya was featured in a video in the WNBA Pride is Love series in 2024.

Williams co-hosts a Twitch channel, StudBudz, with her Lynx teammate Natisha Hiedeman.

== Awards and honors ==
- 2014—AAC First team
- 2014–15 added to watchlist for the Wooden Award, Dawn Staley award, the Naismith Trophy, and the Wade Trophy
- 2015—AP All-America honorable mention
- 2016—AAC First team (unanimous)
- 2016—AAC Scholar-Athlete

== See also ==
- List of WNBA career assists leaders
- List of WNBA career scoring leaders
