= Shekinna Stricklen =

American basketball player (born 1990)

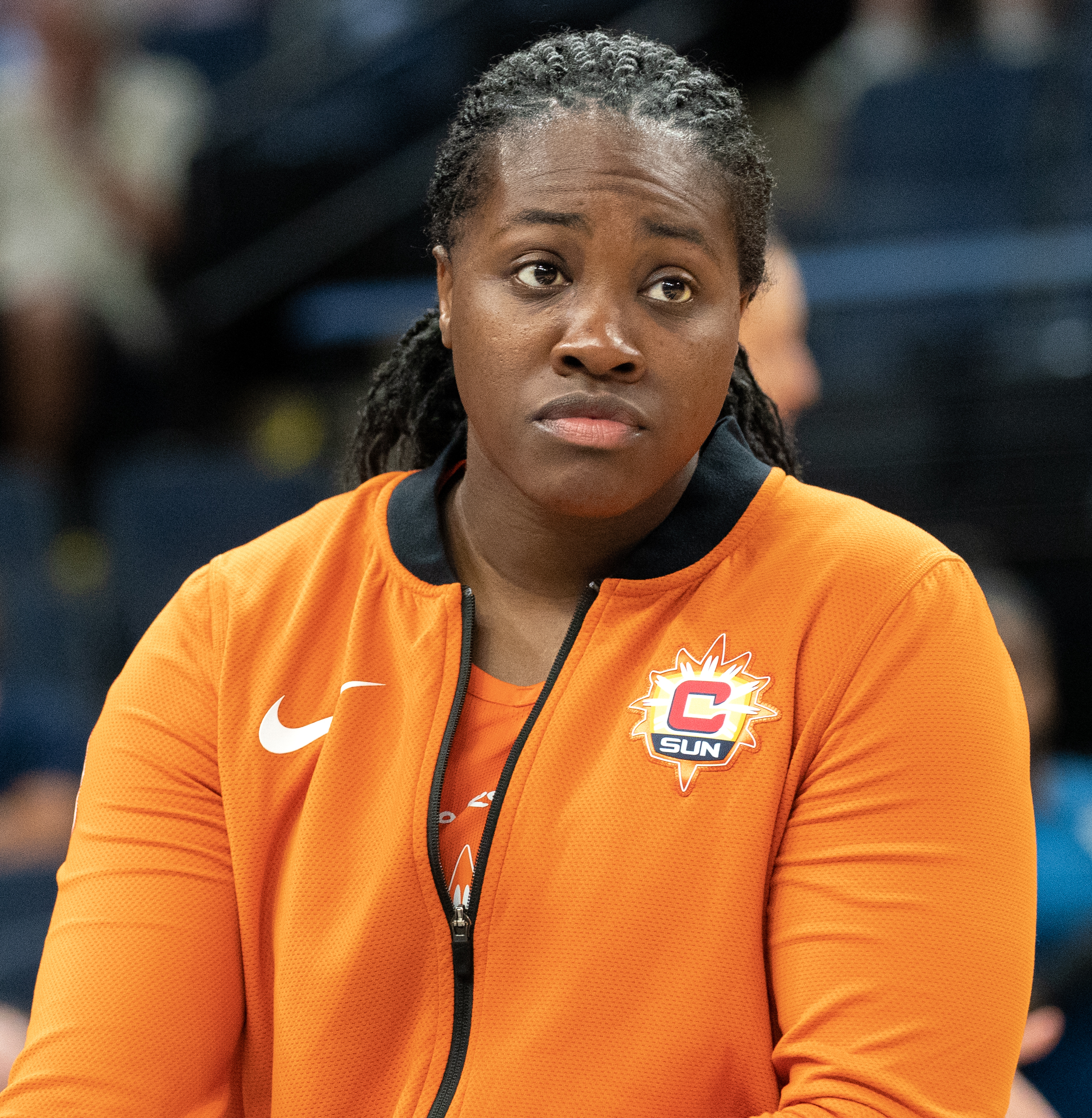
- Stricklen in 2019

Personal information
- Born: July 30, 1990 (age 36) Conway, Arkansas, U.S.
- Listed height: 6 ft 2 in (1.88 m)
- Listed weight: 230 lb (104 kg)

Career information
- High school: Morrilton (Morrilton, Arkansas)
- College: Tennessee (2008–2012)
- WNBA draft: 2012: 1st round, 2nd overall pick
- Drafted by: Seattle Storm
- Playing career: 2012–2021
- Position: Forward
- Number: 40

Career history
- 2012–2014: Seattle Storm
- 2015–2019: Connecticut Sun
- 2016–2017: Fenerbahçe Istanbul
- 2020–2021: Atlanta Dream

Career highlights
- WNBA Three-Point Shootout champion (2019); All-American – USBWA (2011); State Farm Coaches' All-American (2011); SEC Tournament MVP (2011); SEC Player of the Year (2011); 2x Third-team All-American - AP (2011, 2012); 2x First-team All-SEC (2011, 2012); USBWA National Freshman of the Year (2009); SEC All-Freshman Team (2009); McDonald's All-American (2008)
- Stats at WNBA.com
- Stats at Basketball Reference
Medals
Representing United States
World University Games
Gold medal – first place	2011 Shenzhen	Team
FIBA Under-18 Americas Championship
Gold medal – first place	2008 Argentina	Team

Shekinna Stricklen (born July 30, 1990) is an American former basketball forward. Born in Conway, Arkansas, she went to Morrilton High School, which she helped lead to a state championship in 2006, and played collegiately for the Tennessee Lady Vols. She was selected Freshman of the Year by the USBWA.

== USA Basketball ==
Stricklen was a member of the USA Women's U18 team which won the gold medal at the FIBA Americas Championship in Buenos Aires, Argentina. The event was held in July 2008, when the USA team defeated host Argentina to win the championship. Stricklen helped the team win all five games, scoring 8.0 points per game. She was also the second leading rebounder with 7.6 per game.

Stricklen played on the team presenting the US at the 2011 World University Games held in Shenzhen, China. The team, coached by Bill Fennelly, won all six games to earn the gold medal. Stricklen averaged 5.3 points per game.

== Professional career ==
She was selected in the first round of the 2012 WNBA draft (2nd overall) by the Seattle Storm.

On January 28, 2015, Stricklen was traded along with Camille Little to the Connecticut Sun for Renee Montgomery, and the third and fifteen overall picks of the 2015 WNBA draft.

In 2016, Fenerbahçe Istanbul announced her transfer to the club.

Stricklen won the 2019 WNBA Three Point Contest the day before the 2019 WNBA All-Star Game.

Stricklen signed a two-year contract with the Atlanta Dream on February 16, 2020.

== Career statistics ==
Legend
GP	Games played	GS	Games started	MPG	Minutes per game	RPG	Rebounds per game
APG	Assists per game	SPG	Steals per game	BPG	Blocks per game	PPG	Points per game
TO	Turnovers per game	FG%	Field-goal percentage	3P%	3-point field-goal percentage	FT%	Free-throw percentage
**Bold**	Career best	°	League leader

=== WNBA ===
==== Regular season ====
WNBA regular season statistics
Year	Team	GP	GS	MPG	FG%	3P%	FT%	RPG	APG	SPG	BPG	TO	PPG
2012	Seattle	**34**	3	23.1	39.5	31.6	69.2	**4.3**	**1.2**	0.7	0.2	1.0	8.0
2013	Seattle	**34**	21	23.4	41.1	34.4	64.1	2.8	0.8	0.7	**0.4**	1.2	**10.0**
2014	Seattle	33	10	17.5	**43.0**	38.5	73.1	2.1	0.7	0.6	0.1	0.8	7.2
2015	Connecticut	**34**	0	17.6	41.1	35.9	78.6	1.9	0.6	0.6	0.2	0.6	7.7
2016	Connecticut	28	0	10.9	36.5	35.1	64.3	1.4	0.5	0.4	0.1	**0.1**	4.0
2017	Connecticut	**34**	29	**27.2**	41.1	41.0	86.5	3.1	1.1	**1.2**	0.1	0.9	8.6
2018	Connecticut	**34**	30	18.8	**43.0**	**43.0**	85.7	2.3	0.5	0.6	0.1	0.6	6.6
2019	Connecticut	**34**	**34**	23.6	40.8	38.2	81.5	1.9	1.1	1.0	0.2	0.8	9.0
2020	Atlanta	22	15	21.9	34.1	33.3	**100.0**	1.9	0.6	0.3	0.0	0.7	6.1
2021	Atlanta	24	0	9.8	25.9	21.2	40.0	0.9	0.3	0.4	0.2	**0.1**	2.5
**Career**	9 years, 3 teams	311	142	19.8	39.8	36.4	74.8	2.3	0.8	0.7	0.2	0.7	7.2

==== Playoffs ====
WNBA playoff statistics
Year	Team	GP	GS	MPG	FG%	3P%	FT%	RPG	APG	SPG	BPG	TO	PPG
2012	Seattle	3	0	19.0	**53.3**	14.3	60.0	**4.3**	1.7	**1.3**	0.3	0.7	6.7
2013	Seattle	2	2	17.5	20.0	20.0	0.0	2.5	**2.5**	0.5	**1.0**	**0.5**	2.5
2017	Connecticut	1	1	25.0	28.6	20.0	0.0	3.0	0.0	1.0	0.0	1.0	5.0
2018	Connecticut	1	1	23.0	40.0	**40.0**	0.0	1.0	2.0	0.0	0.0	1.0	6.0
2019	Connecticut	**8**	**8**	**27.8**	41.0	34.3	**88.9**	3.1	0.6	0.5	0.0	1.0	**8.8**
**Career**	5 years, 2 teams	15	12	24.1	39.8	29.8	61.1	3.1	1.1	0.7	0.2	0.9	7.1

=== College ===
NCAA statistics
Year	Team	GP	Points	FG%	3P%	FT%	RPG	APG	SPG	BPG	PPG
2008–09	Tennessee	32	424	39.0	29.1	76.1	5.9	3.0	**1.8**	0.7	13.3
2009–10	Tennessee	35	445	44.0	32.0	**82.4**	6.1	**3.9**	1.2	0.7	12.7
2010–11	Tennessee	**37**	474	**48.9**	**38.5**	75.7	**7.3**	2.0	1.2	0.5	12.8
2011–12	Tennessee	35	**539**	43.4	35.2	73.7	6.6	1.9	1.3	0.7	**15.4**
**Career**		139	1882	43.7	33.9	76.8	6.5	2.7	1.4	0.6	13.5
