= List of Seattle Storm seasons =

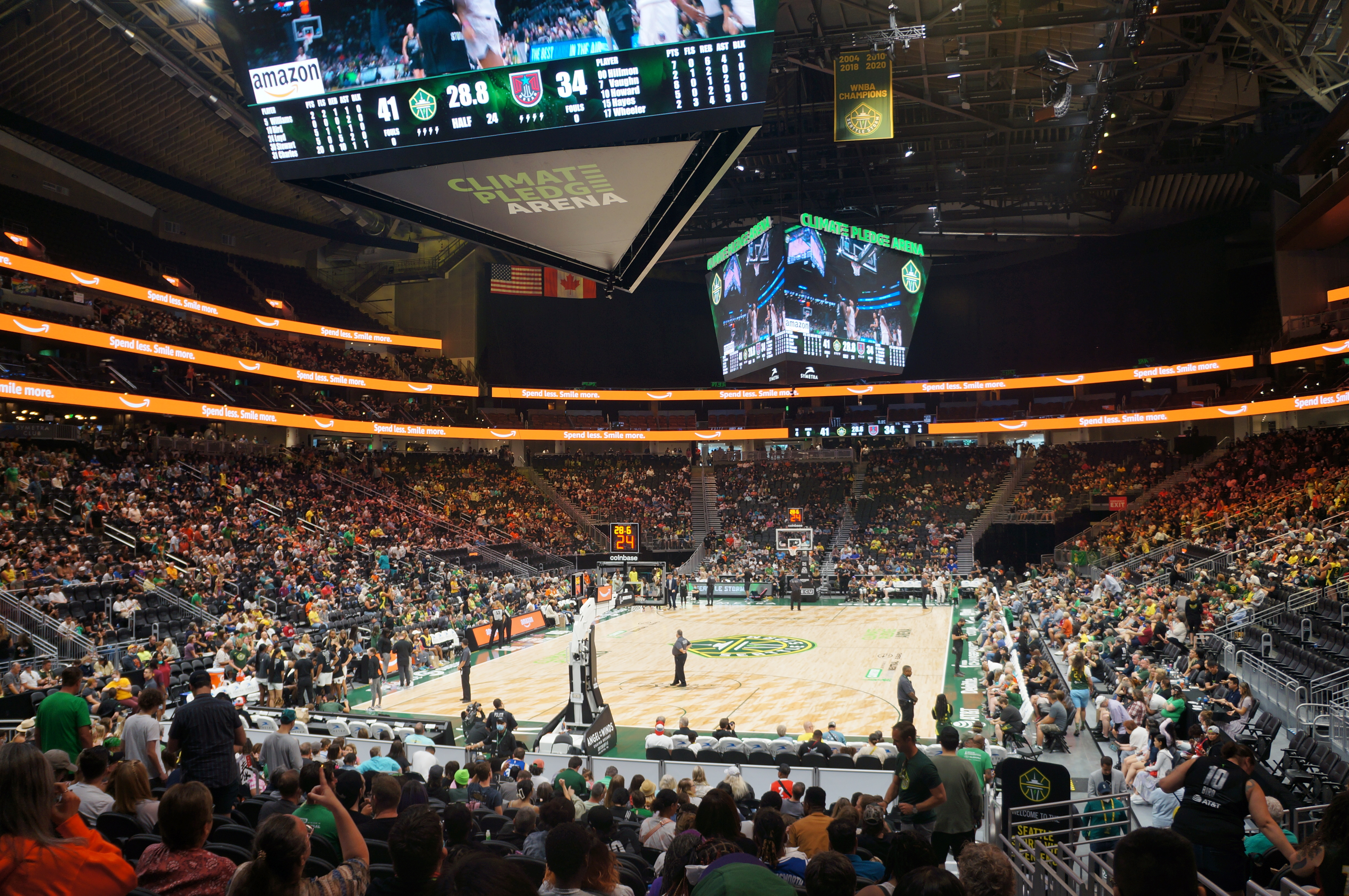
A regular season game between the Seattle Storm and Atlanta Dream at Climate Pledge Arena in 2022

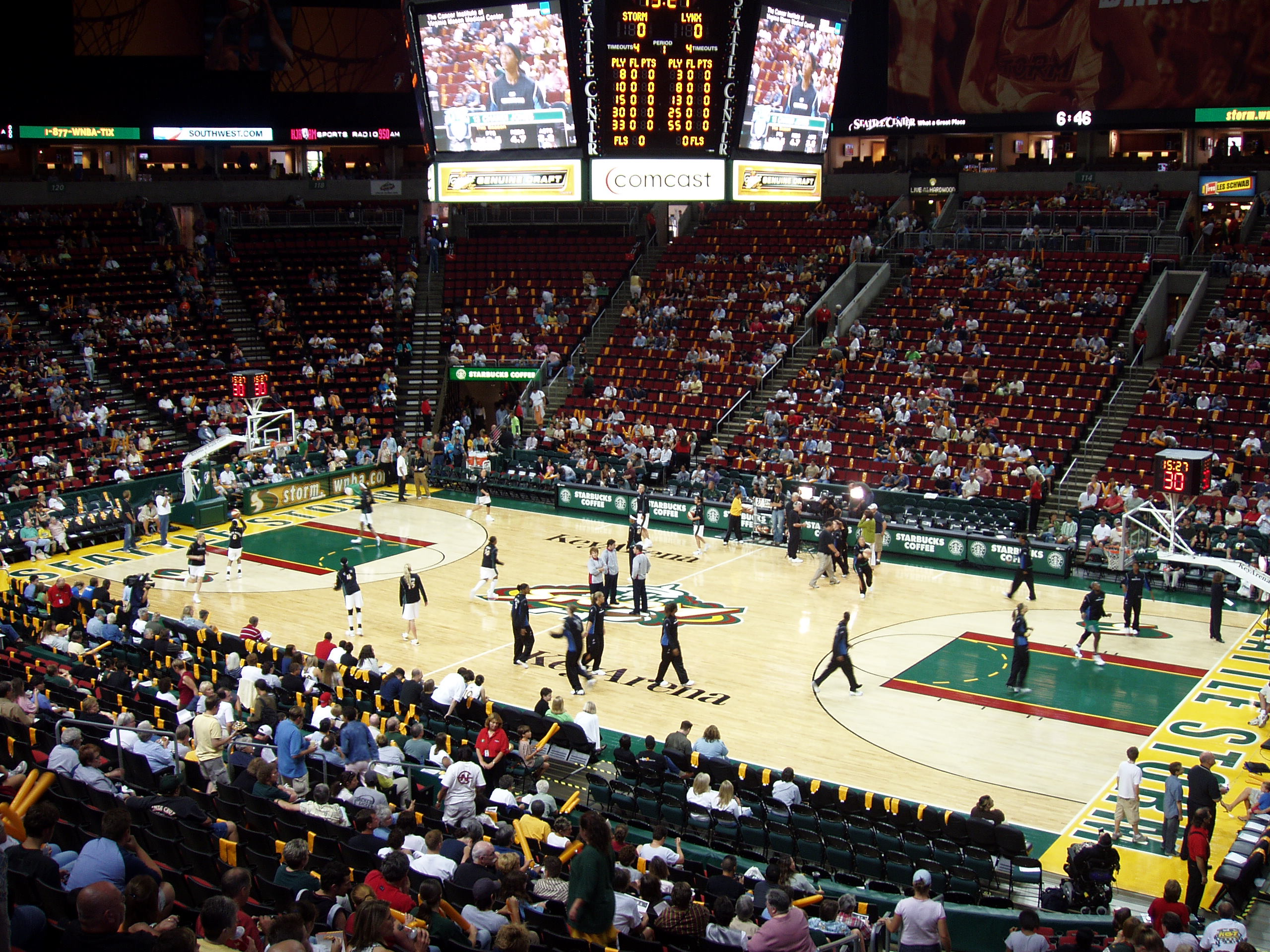
A regular season game at KeyArena in 2007

The Seattle Storm are a professional American women's basketball team based in Seattle, Washington, that competes in the Women's National Basketball Association (WNBA). They are a member of the Western Conference and joined the league in the 2000 season as one of four expansion franchises that year. The Storm initially shared ownership with the Seattle SuperSonics of the National Basketball Association (NBA) and played at the same home venue, KeyArena on the Seattle Center campus. During the relocation of the SuperSonics, the Storm were sold to a new ownership group and remained at KeyArena until it closed after the 2018 season for major renovations. The team temporarily relocated to the Hec Edmundson Pavilion on the University of Washington campus during the 2019 season and Angel of the Winds Arena in Everett during the 2019 and 2021 seasons; the shortened 2020 season was played entirely behind closed doors at an isolated site in Bradenton, Florida, due to the COVID-19 pandemic. Since 2022, the Storm have played at Climate Pledge Arena, a new facility built on the site of KeyArena that has a capacity of 13,500 seats for most WNBA games.

In their 27 seasons, the Storm have an all-time regular season record of 475 wins and 457 losses, the sixth-best among active WNBA teams. The team qualified for the WNBA Playoffs in 20 seasons and have an all-time record of 36 wins and 33 losses. During those playoff runs, the Storm appeared in four WNBA Finals and won the league championship in all four finals. The team also won the inaugural edition of the WNBA Commissioner's Cup, an in-season tournament that debuted in 2021 after a one-year delay due to the COVID-19 pandemic. The team's players include three-time WNBA Most Valuable Player (MVP) winner Lauren Jackson, one-time MVP winner Breanna Stewart, and three-time Sportsmanship Award winner Sue Bird. The trio were among eight Storm players named to The W25, a selection of the 25 best players in WNBA history selected for the league's 25th anniversary in 2021.

The Storm made their debut on May 31, 2000, and finished their first season with a 6–26 win–loss record, the worst in the league that year. The team selected Sue Bird with the first pick of the 2002 WNBA draft and finished their third season with a 17–15 record and their first playoff berth, which ended in a loss in the Western Conference Semifinals. The Storm won their first WNBA championship in the 2004 Finals, where they defeated the Connecticut Sun with two wins in three games; it was the first professional sports championship for Seattle since the SuperSonics won the 1979 NBA Finals. The season also marked the start of a ten-year streak of playoff appearances—the longest in WNBA history at the time—but the team were eliminated in the Western Conference Semifinals for five consecutive years from 2005 to 2009. The Storm finished the 2010 regular season as the top seed in the WNBA and tied the league record for most wins in the regular season with a 28–6 record; they won their second championship that year and became the second WNBA team to win a title without a single loss in the playoffs, which culminated in a three-game sweep of the Atlanta Dream.

Despite limited appearances for injured star players Lauren Jackson and Sue Bird, the team qualified for the playoffs in the following three seasons but never advanced beyond the first round. The Storm failed to qualify for the playoffs in the 2014 and 2015 seasons, but earned the top pick in the subsequent WNBA draft for two consecutive years; Breanna Stewart and Jewell Loyd were chosen in those drafts and both won the Rookie of the Year Award in their debut seasons. The team returned to the playoffs in subsequent years but were again eliminated in the first round; under new head coach Dan Hughes, the Storm won their third championship in 2018 with a three-game shutout of the Washington Mystics. After a second-round exit in the 2019 playoffs—attributed to the absence of Bird and Stewart—the team won their fourth championship against the Las Vegas Aces in the pandemic-shortened 2020 season. The Storm were eliminated from the 2021 playoffs after one game and the 2022 playoffs in the second round; the team did not qualify for the playoffs in the 2023 season but returned in the 2024 season, where they lost to the Las Vegas Aces in the first round.

== Key ==
Key to colors

†	WNBA champions
*	Conference champions (regular season)
¤	Playoff berth
^	WNBA Commissioner's Cup champions

Key to abbreviations

- DNQ – Did not qualify
- Conf. Semis – Conference Semifinals
- Conf. Finals – Conference Finals
- TBD – To be determined

Key to awards

- COY – Coach of the Year
- DPOY – Defensive Player of the Year
- FMVP – Finals Most Valuable Player
- MIP – Most Improved Player
- MVP – Most Valuable Player
- ROY – Rookie of the Year
- SIX – Sixth Player of the Year
- SPOR – Kim Perrot Sportsmanship Award

== Seasons ==
Seattle Storm record by season
Year	Season	Conference	Regular season				Playoff results	Commissioner's Cup results	Awards	Head coach
Year	Season	Conference	W	L	Pct	Finish	Playoff results	Commissioner's Cup results	Awards	Head coach
2000	2000	Western	6	26	.188	8th	DNQ	Established in 2020	—	Lin Dunn
2001	2001	Western	10	22	.313	8th	DNQ	Established in 2020	—	Lin Dunn
2002	2002	Western	17	15	.531	4th ¤	Lost Conf. Semis vs. Los Angeles, 0–2	Established in 2020	—	Lin Dunn
2003	2003	Western	18	16	.529	4th	DNQ	Established in 2020	Lauren Jackson (MVP)	Anne Donovan
2004	2004 †	Western	20	14	.588	2nd ¤	Won Conf. Semis vs. Minnesota, 2–0; Won Conf. Finals vs. Sacramento, 2–1; Won WNBA Finals vs. Connecticut, 2–1 †	Established in 2020	Betty Lennox (FMVP)	Anne Donovan
2005	2005	Western	20	14	.588	2nd ¤	Lost Conf. Semis vs. Houston, 1–2	Established in 2020	—	Anne Donovan
2006	2006	Western	18	16	.529	3rd ¤	Lost Conf. Semis vs. Los Angeles, 1–2	Established in 2020	—	Anne Donovan
2007	2007	Western	17	17	.500	4th ¤	Lost Conf. Semis vs. Phoenix, 0–2	Established in 2020	Lauren Jackson (MVP, DPOY)	Anne Donovan
2008	2008	Western	22	12	.647	2nd ¤	Lost Conf. Semis vs. Los Angeles, 1–2	Established in 2020	—	Brian Agler
2009	2009	Western	20	14	.588	2nd ¤	Lost Conf. Semis vs. Los Angeles, 1–2	Established in 2020	—	Brian Agler
2010	2010 †	Western *	28	6	.824	1st *	Won Conf. Semis vs. Los Angeles, 2–0; Won Conf. Finals vs. Phoenix, 2–0; Won WNBA Finals vs. Atlanta, 3–0 †	Established in 2020	Brian Agler (COY) Lauren Jackson (MVP, FMVP)	Brian Agler
2011	2011	Western	21	13	.618	2nd ¤	Lost Conf. Semis vs. Phoenix, 1–2	Established in 2020	Sue Bird (SPOR)	Brian Agler
2012	2012	Western	16	18	.471	4th ¤	Lost Conf. Semis vs. Minnesota, 1–2	Established in 2020	—	Brian Agler
2013	2013	Western	17	17	.500	4th ¤	Lost Conf. Semis vs. Minnesota, 0–2	Established in 2020	—	Brian Agler
2014	2014	Western	12	22	.353	5th	DNQ	Established in 2020	—	Brian Agler
2015	2015	Western	10	24	.294	5th	DNQ	Established in 2020	Jewell Loyd (ROY)	Jenny Boucek
2016	2016	Western	16	18	.471	3rd ¤	Lost First round vs. Atlanta, 0–1	Established in 2020	Breanna Stewart (ROY)	Jenny Boucek
2017	2017	Western	15	19	.441	5th ¤	Lost First round vs. Phoenix, 0–1	Established in 2020	Sue Bird (SPOR)	Jenny Boucek (10–16) Gary Kloppenburg (5–3)
2018	2018 †	Western *	26	8	.765	1st *	Won Semifinals vs. Phoenix, 3–2; Won WNBA Finals vs. Washington, 3–0 †	Established in 2020	Breanna Stewart (MVP, FMVP) Natasha Howard (MIP) Sue Bird (SPOR)	Dan Hughes
2019	2019	Western	18	16	.529	3rd ¤	Won First round vs. Minnesota, 1–0; Lost Second round vs. Los Angeles, 0–1	Established in 2020	Natasha Howard (DPOY)	Dan Hughes
2020	2020 †	Western	18	4	.818	2nd ¤ (Note: The Seattle Storm had an identical 18–4 record with the Las Vegas Aces, but lost the top seed in the Western Conference on a head-to-head tiebreaker.)	Won Semifinals vs. Minnesota, 3–0; Won WNBA Finals vs. Las Vegas, 3–0 †	Not held	Breanna Stewart (FMVP)	Gary Kloppenburg
2021	2021 ^	Western	21	11	.656	3rd ¤	Lost Second round vs. Phoenix, 0–1	Won Commissioner's Cup vs. Connecticut ^	—	Dan Hughes (5–1) Noelle Quinn (16–10)
2022	2022	Western	22	14	.611	2nd ¤	Won First round vs. Washington, 2–0; Lost Second round vs. Las Vegas, 1–3	DNQ	—	Noelle Quinn
2023	2023	Western	11	29	.275	5th	DNQ	DNQ	—	Noelle Quinn
2024	2024	Western	25	15	.625	3rd ¤	Lost First round vs. Las Vegas, 0–2	DNQ	—	Noelle Quinn
2025	2025	Western	23	21	.523	4th ¤ (Note: The Seattle Storm had an identical 23–21 record with the Golden State Valkyries and each won twice in their head-to-head series. The second tiebreaker, record against teams with a winning percentage above .500, was won by the Storm.)	Lost First round vs. Las Vegas, 1–2	Eliminated in first round (4–2)	—	Noelle Quinn
2026	2026	Western	8	36	.275	8th	DNQ	Eliminated in first round (0–7)	—	Sonia Raman
Totals (27 seasons)			475	457	.510	All-time regular season record (2000–2026)				
Totals (27 seasons)			36	33	.522	All-time playoffs record (2000–2026)				
Totals (27 seasons)			511	490	.510	All-time overall record (2000–2026)				
