= 2017 Connecticut Sun season =

- Head coach: Curt Miller
- Arena: Mohegan Sun Arena

Results
- Record: 21–13 (.618)
- Place: 2nd (Eastern)
- Playoff finish: Lost in Second Round to Phoenix

Media
- Television: NBC Sports Boston and WCCT-TV

The 2017 WNBA season was the 19th season for the Connecticut Sun franchise of the WNBA. It was the 15th season for the franchise in Connecticut. The season tipped off on May 13. The Sun started the season slowly, posting a 1–5 record in May. However, they quickly turned this around going a combined 13–4 in June and July. A 7–2 record in August saw the Sun near the top of the Eastern Conference standings. The Sun finished in second place in the East, just one game back of the New York Liberty after going 0–2 in their final games in September. The Sun earned the 4th seed in the WNBA Playoffs, and a bye into the second round. In the Second Round, they lost to the Phoenix Mercury.

== Transactions ==
=== WNBA draft ===
Round	Pick	Player	Nationality	School/Team/Country
1	8	Brionna Jones	United States	Maryland
2	13	Shayla Cooper	United States	Maryland
2	16	Leticia Romero	Spain	Florida State
3	28	Jessica January	United States	DePaul

== Roster ==
2017 Connecticut Sun roster
Players
Coaches

Pos.	No.	Nat.	Name	Height	Weight	DOB	From	Yrs
F/C	11	(United States)	Adams, Danielle	6' 1" (1.85m)	239 lb (108kg)	1989-02-19	Texas A&M	5
G	1	(United States)	Banham, Rachel	5' 9" (1.75m)	168 lb (76kg)	1993-07-15	Minnesota	2
G	20	(United States)	Bentley, Alex	5' 7" (1.7m)	152 lb (69kg)	1990-10-27	Penn State	4
F/C	35	(The Bahamas)	Jones, Jonquel	6' 6" (1.98m)	190 lb (86kg)	1994-01-05	George Washington	1
F	42	(United States)	Jones, Brionna	6' 3" (1.91m)	230 lb (104kg)	1995-12-18	Maryland	R
C	12	(United States)	Kizer, Lynetta	6' 4" (1.93m)	230 lb (104kg)	1990-04-04	Maryland	5
F	13	(United States)	Ogwumike, Chiney (injured)	6' 3" (1.91m)	174 lb (79kg)	1992-03-22	Stanford	2
F	7	(United States)	Pedersen, Kayla	6' 4" (1.93m)	190 lb (86kg)	1989-04-14	Stanford	5
G/F	40	(United States)	Stricklen, Shekinna	6' 2" (1.88m)	178 lb (81kg)	1990-07-30	Tennessee	5
F	25	(United States)	Thomas, Alyssa	6' 2" (1.88m)	185 lb (84kg)	1992-04-12	Maryland	3
G	5	(United States)	Thomas, Jasmine	5' 9" (1.75m)	145 lb (66kg)	1989-09-30	Duke	6
F	33	(United States)	Tuck, Morgan	6' 2" (1.88m)	200 lb (91kg)	1994-04-30	Connecticut	1
G	10	(United States)	Williams, Courtney	5' 8" (1.73m)	136 lb (62kg)	1994-05-11	South Florida	1

Head coach
(United States) Curt Miller (Baldwin Wallace)
Assistant coaches
(United States) Nicki Collen (Marquette)
(United States) Steve Smith
Athletic trainer
(United States) Jeremy Norman (Keene State)
Strength and conditioning coach
(United States) Tim Yuhas (Connecticut)

Legend

- (C) Team captain
- (DP) Unsigned draft pick
- (FA) Free agent
- (S) Suspended
- Injured

== Game log ==
=== Preseason ===
2017 pre-season game log
May: 3–0 (Home: 2–0; Road: 1–0)

Game	Date	Team	Score	High points	High rebounds	High assists	Location Attendance	Record
1	May 2	Chicago	W 81–72	Adams (12)	Jones (7)	Hightower (3)	Mohegan Sun Arena; 2,782	1–0
2	May 3	Los Angeles	W 79–62	Thomas (10)	Gray (6)	Banham (4)	Mohegan Sun Arena; 2,809	2–0
3	May 7	New York Liberty	W 79–57	Tuck (20)	Jones (6)	Thomas (4)	Columbia University; 388	3–0

2017 pre-season schedule

=== Regular season ===
2017 game log
Total: 18-16 (Home: 12–5; Road: 9–6)
May: 1–5 (Home: 0–2; Road: 1–3)

Game	Date	Team	Score	High points	High rebounds	High assists	Location Attendance	Record
1	May 13	Atlanta	L 74–81	Tuck (21)	Jones (20)	2 Tied (3)	Mohegan Sun Arena; 6,444	0–1
2	May 20	Indiana	L 79–81	Jones (19)	Jones (12)	Jones (4)	Bankers Life Fieldhouse; 7,385	0–2
3	May 23	Minnesota	L 78–80	Thomas (18)	Tuck (10)	2 Tied (6)	Xcel Energy Center; 8,033	0–3
4	May 26	Minnesota	L 68–82	Kizer (12)	2 Tied (5)	Thomas (3)	Mohegan Sun Arena; 6,333	0–4
5	May 28	Chicago	W 97–79	Jones (23)	Jones (21)	Thomas (5)	Allstate Arena; 4,498	1–4
6	May 31	Washington	L 76–78	Stricklen (20)	Jones (13)	Thomas (6)	Verizon Center; 5,393	1–5

June : 6–2 (Home: 3–1; Road: 3–1)

Game	Date	Team	Score	High points	High rebounds	High assists	Location Attendance	Record
7	June 3	San Antonio	W 85–77	Williams (23)	Jones (14)	Thomas (7)	AT&T Center; 7,128	2–5
8	June 10	Atlanta	W 104–71	Jones (20)	Jones (15)	Thomas (11)	Mohegan Sun Arena; 5,327	3–5
9	June 14	New York	W 96–76	Williams (22)	Jones (12)	Thomas (8)	Mohegan Sun Arena; 4,818	4–5
10	June 17	Minnesota	W 98–93	2 Tied (20)	2 Tied (8)	Thomas (8)	Xcel Energy Center; 10,121	5–5
11	June 23	New York	W 94–89	Thomas (23)	Thomas (8)	Thomas (8)	Madison Square Garden; 10,240	6–5
12	June 25	Dallas	L 82–96	Thomas (19)	Jones (12)	Thomas (6)	College Park Center; 3,408	6–6
13	June 27	Los Angeles	L 79–87	Thomas (19)	Jones (17)	3 Tied (3)	Mohegan Sun Arena; 6,899	6–7
14	June 29	Seattle	W 96–89	Thomas (29)	Jones (10)	Thomas (9)	Mohegan Sun Arena; 8,668	7–7

July : 7–2 (Home: 4–0; Road: 3–2)

Game	Date	Team	Score	High points	High rebounds	High assists	Location Attendance	Record
15	July 1	Indiana	W 91–85	Jones (29)	Jones (15)	Thomas (8)	Bankers Life Fieldhouse; 6,473	8–7
16	July 5	San Antonio	W 89–56	Williams (17)	2 Tied (8)	Thomas (8)	AT&T Center; 3,210	9–7
17	July 8	Washington	W 96–92	Jones (22)	Jones (9)	Thomas (5)	Mohegan Sun Arena; 6,073	10–7
18	July 12	Seattle	W 83–79	Stricklen (21)	Jones (12)	Thomas (6)	KeyArena; 10,833	11–7
19	July 13	Los Angeles	L 77–87	Jones (20)	Jones (9)	Thomas (6)	Staples Center; 9,918	11–8
20	July 16	San Antonio	W 89–75	Williams (15)	Thomas (9)	Bentley (7)	Mohegan Sun Arena; 6,355	12–8
21	July 19	New York	L 80–96	Jones (14)	Jones (10)	Williams (4)	Madison Square Garden; 17,443	12–9
22	July 25	Chicago	W 93–72	Thomas (20)	Jones (10)	Thomas (8)	Mohegan Sun Arena; 5,631	13–9
23	July 30	Indiana	W 89–73	Thomas (15)	Jones (13)	Thomas (8)	Mohegan Sun Arena; 6,145	14–9

August : 7–2 (Home: 5–2; Road: 2–0)

Game	Date	Team	Score	High points	High rebounds	High assists	Location Attendance	Record
24	August 4	Phoenix	W 93–92	Jones (19)	Jones (15)	3 Tied (4)	Mohegan Sun Arena; 7,331	15–9
25	August 8	Seattle	W 84–71	Jones (20)	Jones (14)	2 Tied (3)	Mohegan Sun Arena; 7,853	16–9
26	August 12	2017 Dallas Wings season	W 96–88	Thomas (21)	Jones (16)	Bentley (5)	Mohegan Sun Arena; 6,898	17–9
27	August 15	Atlanta	W 96–75	Jones (20)	Jones (13)	Thomas (6)	McCamish Pavilion; 4,585	18–9
28	August 18	New York	L 70–82	Thomas (15)	Jones (9)	Thomas (5)	Mohegan Sun Arena; 7,016	18–10
29	August 20	Phoenix	W 94–66	Jones (20)	Thomas (12)	Thomas (5)	Mohegan Sun Arena; 8,353	19–10
30	August 23	Dallas	W 93–87	Thomas (23)	Jones (17)	2 Tied (5)	Mohegan Sun Arena; 6,465	20–10
31	August 25	Chicago	L 83–96	Thomas (14)	Jones (11)	Thomas (3)	Mohegan Sun Arena; 7,761	20–11
32	August 29	Washington	W 86–76	Thomas (26)	Jones (22)	Jones (6)	Capital One Arena; 10,953	21–11

September : 0–2 (Home: 0–0; Road: 0–2)

Game	Date	Team	Score	High points	High rebounds	High assists	Location Attendance	Record
33	September 1	Phoenix	L 66–86	Thomas (19)	Jones (9)	Thomas (5)	Talking Stick Resort Arena; 9,971	21–12
34	September 3	Los Angeles	L 70–81	Williams (19)	Jones (10)	2 Tied (4)	Staples Center; 12,236	21–13

2017 season schedule

=== Playoffs ===
2017 playoff game log
WNBA Second Round: 0–1 (Home: 0–1; Road: 0–0)

Game	Date	Team	Score	High points	High rebounds	High assists	Location Attendance	Series
1	September 10	Phoenix	L 83-88	Thomas (20)	Jones (15)	Thomas (4)	Mohegan Sun Arena; 8,420	0-1

2017 playoff schedule

== Standings ==
#	Eastern Conference	W	L	PCT	GB	Home	Road	Conf.
1	New York Liberty - **(3)**	22	12	.647	-	13–4	9–8	10–6
2	Connecticut Sun - **(4)**	21	13	.636	1	12–5	9–6	10–6
3	Washington Mystics - **(6)**	18	16	.529	4	11–6	7–10	12-4
4	Chicago Sky - **e**	12	22	.353	10	4–13	8–9	6–10
5	Atlanta Dream - **e**	12	22	.353	10	9–8	3–14	5–11
6	Indiana Fever - **e**	9	25	.265	13	6–11	3–14	4–12

=== Playoffs ===
**First round** Single elimination (Sept. 6)
5	**Phoenix Mercury**	**79**
8	Seattle Storm	69
6	**Washington Mystics**	**86**
7	Dallas Wings	76

**Second round** Single elimination (Sept. 10)
4	Connecticut Sun	83
5	**Phoenix Mercury**	**88**
3	New York Liberty	68
6	**Washington Mystics**	**82**

**Semifinals**; Best-of-5 (Sept. 12 – Sept. 17)
2	**Los Angeles Sparks**	**3**
5	Phoenix Mercury	0
1	**Minnesota Lynx**	**3**
6	Washington Mystics	0

**WNBA Finals**; Best-of-5 (Sept. 24 – Oct. 4)
1	**Minnesota Lynx**	**3**
2	Los Angeles Sparks	2

Note: Teams re-seeded after second round and semi-finals.

- **Bold** – Game or series winner
- Italic – Team with home-court advantage

== Awards and honors ==
Recipient	Award	Date awarded	Ref.
Jonquel Jones	Player of the Week award	June 18, 2017	
Alyssa Thomas	Player of the Week award	June 25, 2017	
Jasmine Thomas	Player of the Week award	July 2, 2017	
Alyssa Thomas	Player of the Week award	July 10, 2017	
Jonquel Jones	Player of the Week award	August 14, 2017	
Jonquel Jones	Player of the Month award	June 2017	
Curt Miller	Coach of the Month award	July 2017	
Curt Miller	Executive of the Year	September 10, 2017	
Curt Miller	Coach of the Year	September 10, 2017	
Jonquel Jones	Most Improved Player	September 10, 2017	

== Statistics ==
Legend
GP	Games played	GS	Games started	MPG	Minutes per game	RPG	Rebounds per game
APG	Assists per game	SPG	Steals per game	BPG	Blocks per game	PPG	Points per game
FG%	Field-goal percentage	3P%	3-point field-goal percentage	FT%	Free-throw percentage	TO	Turnovers per game
PF	Fouls per game		Team leader		League leader

=== Regular season ===
Player	GP	GS	MPG	FG%	3P%	FT%	RPG	APG	SPG	BPG	PPG
Jonquel Jones	34	34	28.5	53.4%	44.6%	81.8%	11.9	1.5	0.9	1.5	15.4
Alyssa Thomas	33	33	29.8	50.9%	0.0%	56.7%	6.8	4.5	1.6	0.4	14.8
Jasmine Thomas	32	31	28.2	42.1%	40.3%	78.1%	2.3	4.3	1.6	0.1	14.2
Courtney Williams	34	28	26.0	47.3%	32.4%	87.8%	4.2	2.1	0.5	0.2	12.3
Shekinna Stricklen	34	29	27.2	41.1%	41.0%	86.5%	3.1	1.1	1.2	0.1	8.6
Alex Bentley	31	9	23.7	38.0%	27.8%	80.9%	1.5	2.9	0.8	0.1	8.4
Lynetta Kizer	20	1	11.9	48.0%	0.0%	76.7%	2.9	0.3	0.6	0.4	6.0
Morgan Tuck	22	5	16.6	35.4%	28.9%	81.0%	2.2	0.9	0.4	0.0	5.4
Rachel Banham	30	0	9.4	32.7%	28.1%	80.0%	1.1	0.7	0.1	0.0	3.3
Brionna Jones	23	0	6.4	57.5%	—	83.3%	1.7	0.1	0.4	0.1	2.9
Danielle Adams	19	0	4.4	35.6%	38.7%	100%	0.6	0.2	0.2	0.2	2.6
Kayla Pedersen	26	0	10.2	37.1%	0.0%	70.6%	2.3	0.6	0.3	0.1	1.5
Feyonda Fitzgerald	2	0	4.0	0.0%	—	—	2.0	0.5	0.0	0.0	0.0
Jordan Hooper	3	0	3.7	0.0%	0.0%	—	0.3	0.0	0.0	0.0	0.0
