= StudBudz =

Social media influencer duo

StudBudz is the name of both a Twitch livestream and the backcourt duo of former Minnesota Lynx teammates Courtney Williams and Natisha Hiedeman. The pair gained widespread attention in 2025 through their unscripted streaming content and high-profile presence at the WNBA All-Star Game in Indianapolis, Indiana.

== History ==
Williams and Hiedeman met during Hiedeman's rookie season with the Connecticut Sun when Williams was in her fourth season there. They play the same position on the team (guard), and Williams became a mentor for Hiedeman. The pair often affectionately refer to themselves as "twins" to acknowledge their deep friendship but also as a nod to the twin cities Minneapolis–Saint Paul, and also the Minnesota Twins baseball team.

In June 2025, Williams and Hiedeman launched an Instagram account and a Twitch channel to document their adventures playing on the road and chatting about everyday things. Hiedeman suggested the name "StudBudz," which alludes to their identities as "studs," a term used within the African-American LGBTQ community to describe more masculine-presenting women as opposed to those who present as "femme."

StudBudz became popular quickly due to their unscripted everyday content, such as travel diaries, team practices, hotel routines, hair-dye experiments, game reactions to other teams, and informal interviews with teammates and competitors. By August, the Twitch channel reached over 78,000 followers; and the Instagram account had over 110,000 followers.

=== 2025 WNBA All-Star game ===
The 2025 WNBA All-Star Weekend in Indianapolis marked a turning point for StudBudz. Prior to the event, Williams and Hiedeman promised that if one of them was selected as an All-Star, they would commit to a continuous 72-hour livestream. When Williams earned an All-Star selection, the duo followed through on the pledge with Hiedeman recording video from behind the player's bench while Williams played in the Sunday All-Star game.

Off the court, the uninterrupted broadcast streamed even while they slept in the team hotel, capturing behind-the-scenes aspects of the weekend, including parties and glimpses of players before a collective bargaining meeting. Guests such as WNBA Commissioner Cathy Engelbert, Indiana Pacers guard Tyrese Haliburton, Indiana Fever guard Caitlin Clark, and many others made spontaneous appearances.

The stream drew over 300,000 views across the weekend and further boosted the StudBudz's visibility. One video even surpassed 500,000 views.

== Cultural impact ==
StudBudz has been credited with reshaping narratives around WNBA culture, by embracing Williams' and Hiedeman's LGBTQ+ identities, which marks a shift in the league. Minnesota Lynx head coach Cheryl Reeve, who also is gay, has openly supported Williams' and Hiedeman's efforts, often noting that the WNBA once suppressed that representation. Further, commentators have pointed to StudBudz as an example of how authentic player-driven media, like those found on Instagram, can amplify diverse stories within women's sports.

As of September 2025, the StudBudz have sponsorships, brand deals, or merchandise partnerships with TOGETHXR, Playa Society, DoorDash, and the Knickerbocker Hotel in New York City.

Their signature matching pink hair, adopted during the summer of 2025, also became a recognizable symbol of the brand.

In August 2025, the StudBudz appeared on the cover of SLAM magazine.
