= 2019 WNBA playoffs =

Professional women's basketball tournament

- Dates: September 11 – October 10, 2019

Final positions
- Champions: Washington Mystics
- Runners-up: Connecticut Sun

Tournament statistics
- Attendance: 97,322
- Scoring leader (s): Emma Meesseman (Washington) (19.3 PPG)

Awards
- MVP: Emma Meesseman (Washington)

The 2019 WNBA playoffs were the postseason tournament of the WNBA's 2019 season. The Washington Mystics won the team's first WNBA title in their 22-year franchise history.

== Format ==
Following the WNBA regular season, the top eight teams in the overall league standings, without regard to conference alignment, qualified for the playoffs and were seeded from one to eight. Seedings were based strictly on regular-season record. The team with the best record received the #1 seed, the team with the next best record received the #2 seed, and so on. The top two seeds earned double byes (i.e., advanced directly to the semifinals), while the next two seeds received first-round byes.

These seedings were used to create a bracket that determines the matchups throughout the playoffs. The first round of the playoffs consisted of two matchups based on the seedings (5-8 and 6-7). The two winners advanced to the second round with a matchup between the number three seed and the lower of the advancing seeds and another matchup between the number four seed and the other first round winner. The winners of the first two rounds advanced to the semifinals, where the lower-ranked seed of the winners faces the number one seed, with the other remaining team facing the number two seed.

The first two rounds were single-elimination games played on the higher ranking seed's home court. The semifinals and WNBA Finals are best-of-five series played in a 2-2-1 format, meaning the team with home-court advantage (better record) hosts games 1, 2, and 5 while their opponent hosts games 3 and 4.

=== Tiebreak procedures ===
1. Better winning percentage among all head-to-head games involving tied teams.
2. Better winning percentage against all teams with .500 or better record at the end of the season.
3. Better point differential in games net result of total points scored less total points allowed head-to-head.
4. Better point differential net result of total points scored less total points allowed against all opponents.
5. Coin toss (or draw of lots, if at least three teams are still tied after the first four tiebreakers fail).

== Playoff qualifying ==
Seed	Team	Record	Clinched		
Seed	Team	Record	Playoff berth	Bye to Semis	Top Record
1	Washington Mystics	26–8	August 16	August 31	September 6
2	Connecticut Sun	23–11	August 18	September 4	No
3	Los Angeles Sparks	22–12	August 22	No	No
4	Las Vegas Aces	21–13	August 18	No	No
5	Chicago Sky	20–14	August 23	No	No
6	Seattle Storm*^{[note 1]}	18–16	August 25	No	No
7	Minnesota Lynx*^{[note 1]}	18–16	August 27	No	No
8	Phoenix Mercury	15–19	August 29	No	No

^note 1Seattle earned the sixth seed via the first tie-breaker of head-to-head record versus the Lynx in the regular season. Seattle won the regular season series 3–0.

For the third straight year, five teams from the Western Conference qualified for the playoffs, while only three from the Eastern Conference qualified.

== Bracket ==
**First round** Single elimination (Sept. 11)
5	**Chicago Sky**	**105**
8	Phoenix Mercury	76
6	**Seattle Storm**	**84**
7	Minnesota Lynx	74

**Second round** Single elimination (Sept. 15)
4	**Las Vegas Aces**	**93**
5	Chicago Sky	92
3	**Los Angeles Sparks**	**92**
6	Seattle Storm	69

**Semifinals**; Best-of-5 (Sept. 17 – 24)
1	**Washington Mystics**	**3**
4	Las Vegas Aces	1
2	**Connecticut Sun**	**3**
3	Los Angeles Sparks	0

**WNBA Finals**; Best-of-5 (Sept. 29 – Oct. 10)
1	**Washington Mystics**	**3**
2	Connecticut Sun	2

Note: Teams re-seeded after each round.

- **Bold** – Game or series winner
- Italic – Team with home-court advantage

== First round ==
=== Sky vs. Mercury ===
In 2019's first playoff game the #5 Chicago Sky hosted the #8 seed Phoenix Mercury. During the regular season, Chicago posted a solid 12–5 home record while Phoenix had a 6–11 road record. Phoenix also limped into the playoffs, losing its last four games, including a 105–78 loss to Chicago on September 1. Chicago came into the game having won just two of their last five games.

The first quarter of the game was a close affair, with the score being 44–41 going into halftime. However, with 8:18 left in the second quarter, the Mercury lost Brittney Griner to a left knee injury. She played sparingly in the third quarter, but would go on to miss the rest of the game. The Sky broke away during the third quarter, and took a 13-point lead into the final period. The Sky continued to dominated and ended up winning the game by 29 points. The final score was just two points different from the September 1 meeting between the teams. The Sky were led by Diamond DeShields who scored 25 points. Astou Ndour and Stefanie Dolson also added 16 points each. Additionally, Allie Quigley and Cheyenne Parker scored in double figures.

ESPN2, SN1

September 11
8:00pm ET

Box Score

**#5 Chicago Sky** **105**, #8 Phoenix Mercury 76
Scoring by quarter: **20**–16, 24–**25**, **29**–19, **32**–16
Pts: Diamond DeShields (25); Rebs: Astou Ndour (9); Asts: Courtney Vandersloot (11)	Pts: DeWanna Bonner (21); Rebs: DeWanna Bonner (6); Asts: Leilani Mitchell, Yvonne Turner, Camille Little (3)

Wintrust Arena
Attendance: 6,042
Referees: Maj Forsberg
Byron Jarrett
Tim Greene
Fatou Cissoko-Stephens

=== Storm vs. Lynx ===
In the second first-round game, the #6 Seattle Storm hosted the #7 Minnesota Lynx. The Storm endured a difficult season in which their two stars, Breanna Stewart and Sue Bird missed the whole season. The two were key contributors on last season's championship team. The Storm finished the regular season with an 11–6 home record, despite having to play in a temporary home. The Lynx finished 7–10 on the road in a season where they also dealt with the absence of star Maya Moore. The teams finished with identical 18–16 regular season records. Seattle was selected as the host via the tie-breaker of winning the regular season series 3–1. Both teams had won four of their last five games heading into the matchup.

The second game of the evening proved to be a closer affair than the first. Ultimately, Seattle proved to be in control for most of the game, advancing to the second round with a ten-point win. Minnesota scored with 5:52 remaining in the game to draw within four points, but could not gain the lead from there. Jordin Canada scored a career high 26 points, and Jewell Loyd scored 22 points to lead the Storm. Minnesota had three players score in double-digits, but the rest of the team only scored 21 points combined. Napheesa Collier became the first rookie since Candace Parker to score a double-double in her playoff debut.

ESPN2, TSN2

September 11
10:00pm ET

Box Score

**#6 Seattle Storm** **84**, #7 Minnesota Lynx 74
Scoring by quarter: **29**–21, 18–**20**, 17–**18**, **20**–15
Pts: Jordin Canada (26); Rebs: Mercedes Russell (9); Asts: Natasha Howard (6)	Pts: Damiris Dantas (20); Rebs: Sylvia Fowles (11); Asts: Odyssey Sims (5)

Angel of the Winds Arena
Attendance: 5,011
Referees: Roy Gulbeyan
Billy Smith
Cheryl Flores
Isaac Barnett

== Second round ==
=== Sparks vs. Storm ===
The first game of the second round will had the #3 seed Los Angeles Sparks host the #6 seed Seattle Storm. The Sparks earned a first round bye, finishing with a 22–12 record, including a 15–2 home record, which was tied for the league best. Their last home loss was on June 18. The Sparks also won four of their last five regular season games. The Storm advanced to the second round by defeating the Minnesota Lynx in the first round. The Storm had a 7–10 road record in the regular season. The Sparks won the regular season series 2–1, with both wins coming at home.

The Storm got out to a quick start, leading 23–22 after the first quarter. However, their lead quickly faded, and they trialed 43–36 by halftime. Los Angeles closed with a strong fourth quarter to win by 23 and advance to the Semifinals. Four of the five Spark's starters ended the game with double-digit points scored. First-year head coach Derek Fisher lead the Sparks to the victory in his first playoff game in the WNBA. Three key contributors in the game for the Sparks missed a combined total of 73 games during the regular season (Parker, Williams, and Vadeeva). The Storm also had four of five starters in double figures, but their bench was outscored 27–13. The Storm could not defend their title from last season.

ESPN2, SN1

September 15
3:00pm ET

Box Score

#3 **Los Angeles Sparks** **92**, #6 Seattle Storm 69
Scoring by quarter: 22–**23**, **21**–13, **24**–22, **25**–11
Pts: Chelsea Gray (21); Rebs: Candace Parker (10); Asts: Chelsea Gray (8)	Pts: Natasha Howard (20); Rebs: Natasha Howard (11); Asts: Jordin Canada (7)

Staples Center
Attendance: 9,081
Referees: Roy Gulbeyan
Michael Price
Tiffany Bird
Isaac Barnett

=== Aces vs. Sky ===
The second game of the second round saw the Las Vegas Aces host the Chicago Sky. The Aces were returning to the playoffs for the first time since 2014, when they were based in San Antonio. The Aces finished the regular season with a 21–13 record, including a 13–4 home record. The Sky come into the game on the back of a first round win against the Phoenix Mercury. Chicago finished with an 8–9 road record during the regular season. The Aces won the regular season series 2–1.

The game was close throughout, with the Sky leading by six points at the half. The Aces came out with a strong third quarter and went into the fourth with a one-point lead. The Sky were up by one with fifteen seconds to play. The Sky in-bounded to Courtney Vandersloot who had 300 assists and 96 turnovers during the regular season. Under pressure from two Aces defenders, she threw an errant pass that was intercepted by Dearica Hamby. Hamby dribbled past half-court and heaved a shot with just under seven seconds remaining. The shot fell and gave the Aces the 93–92 win. Both Liz Cambage and A'ja Wilson recorded double-doubles for the Aces. With the Aces' win, 2019 became the first playoff year to have all four home teams win since the WNBA switched to the current playoff format in 2016.

ESPN2, TSN2

September 15
5:00pm ET

Box Score

#4 **Las Vegas Aces** **93**, #5 Chicago Sky 92
Scoring by quarter: 21–**29**, **24**–22, **31**–24, 17–17
Pts: Liz Cambage (23); Rebs: Liz Cambage (17); Asts: Kelsey Plum (6)	Pts: Diamond DeShields (23); Rebs: Astou Ndour (8); Asts: Courtney Vandersloot (12)

Thomas & Mack Center
Attendance: 7,981
Referees: Eric Brewton
Jeff Wooten
Tiara Cruse
Randy Richardson

== Semifinals ==
=== Mystics vs. Aces ===
The Aces won their second-round game to earn a spot in the Semifinals versus the Mystics. The Mystics have home court advantage thanks to their WNBA best 26–8 regular season record. The Mystics won the regular season series 2–1, with the road team winning each game. The Mystics finished the season strong, winning their last six games, and 12 of their last 14 games. The Mystics come into the series having won ten straight home games.

Game 1

The first quarter was a close affair, with the Aces shooting 73.3% but still trailing. They carried that momentum into a seven-point halftime lead. However, the Mystics came back in the third quarter, winning the quarter by ten points and carrying a three-point lead into the final period. The Mystics managed to hold off an Aces comeback and win by two points. The Mystics led by as many as thirteen in the fourth quarter, and the Aces never managed to pull ahead, always trailing by at least two points. Emma Meesseman scored a career playoff high twenty seven points. A'ja Wilson scored twenty three points to lead the Aces.

ESPN2, TSN4/5

September 17
8:30pm ET

Box Score

#1 **Washington Mystics** **97**, #4 Las Vegas Aces 95
Scoring by quarter: **30**–27, 20–**30**, **26**–16, 21–**22**
Pts: Emma Meesseman (27); Rebs: Emma Meesseman (10); Asts: Elena Delle Donne (6)	Pts: A'ja Wilson (23); Rebs: Liz Cambage (12); Asts: Kelsey Plum (9)

Entertainment and Sports Arena
Attendance: 3,968
Referees: Roy Gulbeyan
Tim Greene
Billy Smith
Tiara Cruse

Game 2

Game two proved to be a tight affair in the first half, with the Mystics taking a one-point lead into halftime. The Aces briefly lead in the third quarter, but the Mystics won the quarter by ten points, and the game by twelve. The Mystics have now won four of the last five games between the two teams, including the regular season. Emma Meesseman lead the Mystics in scoring for the second straight game. Meesseman did not play with the team last year, and has proved to be a difference maker in the first two games of the series. Four players scored doubles-doubles in the game. Elena Delle Donne and Liz Cambage achieved a double-double with points and rebounds, while Natasha Cloud and Kelsey Plum reached theirs via points and assists.

ESPN2, TSN3

September 19
8:30pm ET

Box Score

#1 **Washington Mystics** **103**, #4 Las Vegas Aces 91
Scoring by quarter: **30**–26, 20–**23**, **30**–20, **23**–22
Pts: Emma Meesseman (30); Rebs: Elena Delle Donne (10); Asts: Natasha Cloud (11)	Pts: Liz Cambage (23); Rebs: Liz Cambage (10); Asts: Kelsey Plum (10)

Entertainment and Sports Arena
Attendance: 4,200
Referees: Michael Price
Maj Forsberg
Tim Greene
Isaac Barnett

Game 3

Facing elimination, the Las Vegas Aces used a strong second and third quarter to win their first game in the series. Stars A'ja Wilson and Liz Cambage combined for 49 points and 14 rebounds to lead the Aces. The Aces also out-rebounded the Mystics 40–28. The Aces also improved on their defense, holding the Mystics to only one starter who scored in double-digits, Elena Delle Donne. The Aces players also credited the home crowd with some help in the improved effort.

ESPN2, TSN5

September 22
5:00pm ET

Box Score

#4 **Las Vegas Aces** **92**, #1 Washington Mystics 75
Scoring by quarter: 23–**24**, **24**–13, **32**–25, 13–13
Pts: Liz Cambage (28); Rebs: A'ja Wilson (8); Asts: Kelsey Plum (9)	Pts: Elena Delle Donne (22); Rebs: Emma Meesseman (8); Asts: Natasha Cloud (6)

Mandalay Bay Events Center
Attendance: 6,175
Referees: Cheryl Flores
Eric Brewton
Jeff Wooten

Game 4

The Aces looked to keep their momentum from their previous win going in their second and final home game of the series. They got out to a quick start, winning the first quarter by nine points. However, the Mystics won the second quarter by eleven points to take a two-point lead into halftime. The Aces won the third quarter by three points to take a lead into the fourth. The Mystics were able to close out the win and advance to the finals. Elena Delle Donne, Emma Meesseman, and Kristi Toliver all score twenty plus points for the Mystics, while only Liz Cambage scored over twenty for the Aces.

ESPN2, TSN5

September 24
9:00pm ET

Box Score

#4 Las Vegas Aces 90, #1 **Washington Mystics** **94**
Scoring by quarter: **26**–17, 17–**28**, **25**–22, 22–**27**
Pts: Liz Cambage (25); Rebs: Liz Cambage (12); Asts: Dearica Hamby (7)	Pts: Elena Delle Donne (25); Rebs: LaToya Sanders/Natasha Cloud (6); Asts: Kristi Toliver/Natasha Cloud (9)

Mandalay Bay Events Center
Attendance: 5,465
Referees: Michael Price
Maj Forsberg
Byron Jarrett
Jeff Wooten

=== Sun vs. Sparks ===
The Los Angeles Sparks dominated their Second round matchup to earn a spot in the Semifinals versus the Connecticut Sun. Connecticut had the WNBA's second best regular season record at 23–11. However, the Sun finished the regular season 3–3, including losses in their last two games. The Sun had a 15–2 home record, which was tied for the WNBA's best with the Sparks. The Sparks won the regular season series 2–1, with the home team winning each matchup.

Game 1

The first two quarters were a back and forth affair, with the Sun winning the first quarter by seven points and the Sparks winning the second quarter by ten points. However, the Sun scored the first nine points after halftime and never looked back. The Sun won their first playoff game since 2012 behind four double-digit scorers. The Sparks had two players score twenty or more points, but no other players scored in double-digits. The Sun held the Sparks starting back court to 3–17 shooting and force seventeen turnovers. This was Chiney Ogwumike's first playoff game in Connecticut since the former Sun star was granted a trade to LA in the offseason. She was booed when the lineups were announced and each time she touched the ball.

ESPN2, SN1

September 17
6:30pm ET

Box Score

#2 **Connecticut Sun** **84**, #3 Los Angeles Sparks 75
Scoring by quarter: **21**–14, 16–**26**, **22**–18, **25**–17
Pts: Alyssa Thomas (22); Rebs: Alyssa Thomas (10); Asts: Jasmine Thomas (8)	Pts: Candace Parker (24); Rebs: Candace Parker/Nneka Ogwumike (10); Asts: Chelsea Gray (4)

Mohegan Sun Arena
Attendance: 7,102
Referees: Michael Price
Cheryl Flores
Isaac Barnett

Game 2

The first half of game two was a story of two quarters, with the Sparks winning the first quarter by seven points, but the Sun winning the second by eight points. The Sun took a one-point lead into halftime. The Sun won the third quarter by twelve points, propelled by Courtney Williams, who scored thirteen of her twenty five points in the quarter. The Sun also won the fourth quarter by thirteen points, to wrap up a twenty-six point win. The Sun out rebounded the Sparks 46–24 and set a WNBA Playoff record for rebounds in a half with their 29 in the first half. Both teams had four players score in double-digits, but the Sun had two twenty point scorers, while the Sparks had zero.

ESPN2, TSN3

September 19
6:30pm ET

Box Score

#2 **Connecticut Sun** **94**, #3 Los Angeles Sparks 68
Scoring by quarter: 15–**22**, **26**–18, **29**–17, **24**–11
Pts: Jonquel Jones (27); Rebs: Jonquel Jones/Alyssa Thomas (13); Asts: Jasmine Thomas (7)	Pts: Nneka Ogwumike (18); Rebs: Nneka Ogwumike (7); Asts: Chelsea Gray (5)

Mohegan Sun Arena
Attendance: 8,051
Referees: Roy Gulbeyan
Eric Brewton
Tiffany Bird

Game 3

The Sun won every quarter, including the third by eleven points on their way to a twenty-two point win, and a series sweep. The game was played at the Walter Pyramid because the Spark's usual home, the Staples Center, was hosting the Emmy Awards. Jasmine Thomas and Courtney Williams combined for forty-six points and were the only Sun players to score in double-digits. However, only Nneka Ogwumike scored in double digits for the Sparks in the low-scoring affair. Williams completed a double-double with thirteen rebounds. The Sun return to the WNBA Finals for the first time since 2005.

ESPN2, SN1

September 22
7:00pm ET

Box Score

#3 Los Angeles Sparks 56, #2 **Connecticut Sun** **78**
Scoring by quarter: 11–**14**, 21–**26**, 12–**23**, 12–**15**
Pts: Nneka Ogwumike (17); Rebs: Nneka Ogwumike/Kalani Brown (6); Asts: Alyssa Thomas (6)	Pts: Jasmine Thomas (29); Rebs: Courtney Williams (13); Asts: Chelsea Gray (4)

Walter Pyramid
Attendance: 4,000
Referees: Billy Smith
Maj Forsberg
Byron Jarrett

== WNBA Finals ==
Game 1

ESPN, TSN5

September 29
3:00pm ET

Box Score

Connecticut Sun 86, **Washington Mystics** **95**
Scoring by quarter: 17–**30**, **29**–25, 20–**21**, **20**–19
Pts: Courtney Williams (26); Rebs: Alyssa Thomas / Jonquel Jones (6); Asts: Alyssa Thomas (6)	Pts: Elena Delle Donne (22); Rebs: Elena Delle Donne (10); Asts: Natasha Cloud (7)

St. Elizabeth's East Arena
Attendance: 4,200
Referees: Roy Gulbeyan
Byron Jarrett
Tim Greene
Cheryl Flores

Game 2

ESPN, TSN2

October 1
8:00pm ET

Box Score

**Connecticut Sun** **99**, Washington Mystics 87
Scoring by quarter: **29**–17, 27–**29**, 17–**23**, **26**–18
Pts: Jonquel Jones (32); Rebs: Jonquel Jones (18); Asts: Alyssa Thomas / Courtney Williams (6)	Pts: Emma Meesseman (23); Rebs: Emma Meesseman (8); Asts: Kristi Toliver (7)

St. Elizabeth's East Arena
Attendance: 4,200
Referees: Michael Price
Maj Forsberg
Tim Greene
Billy Smith

Game 3

ABC, SN360

October 6
3:30pm ET

Box Score

**Washington Mystics** **94**, Connecticut Sun 81
Scoring by quarter: **32**-17, 11-**22**, **25**-18, **26**-24
Pts: Emma Meesseman (21); Rebs: Aerial Powers (8); Asts: Kristi Toliver (10)	Pts: Shekinna Stricklen / Jasmine Thomas (16); Rebs: Jonquel Jones (9); Asts: Alyssa Thomas (9)

Mohegan Sun Arena
Attendance: 9,170
Referees: Eric Brewton
Roy Gulbeyan
Tiffany Bird

Game 4

ESPN2, TSN4/5

October 8
8:00pm ET

Box Score

Washington Mystics 86, **Connecticut Sun** **90**
Scoring by quarter: 17–**32**, 23–**24**, **28**–12, 18–**22**
Pts: Aerial Powers (15); Rebs: Natasha Cloud (7); Asts: Natasha Cloud (9)	Pts: Jonquel Jones (18); Rebs: Jonquel Jones (13); Asts: Alyssa Thomas (11)

Mohegan Sun Arena
Attendance: 8,458
Referees: Michael Price
Maj Forsberg
Byron Jarrett

Game 5

ESPN2, TSN4

October 10
8:00pm ET

Box Score

Connecticut Sun 78, **Washington Mystics** **89**
Scoring by quarter: 20–**23**, **23**–19, **21**–20, 14–**27**
Pts: Jonquel Jones (25); Rebs: Alyssa Thomas (12); Asts: Alyssa Thomas / Jasmine Thomas (6)	Pts: Emma Meesseman (22); Rebs: Elena Delle Donne (9); Asts: Kristi Toliver (4)

St. Elizabeth's East Arena
Attendance: 4,200
Referees: Eric Brewton
Roy Gulbeyan
Maj Forsberg
