= 2012 Seattle Storm season =

- Head coach: Brian Agler
- Arena: KeyArena

Results
- Record: 16–18 (.471)
- Place: 4th (Western)
- Playoff finish: Lost in Conference Semifinals (2-1) to Minnesota Lynx

Media
- Television: KONG; ESPN2, NBATV
- Radio: KPTK

The 2012 WNBA season was the 13th season for the Seattle Storm of the Women's National Basketball Association.

== Transactions ==
=== WNBA draft ===
The following are the Storm's selections in the 2012 WNBA draft.

Round	Pick	Player	Nationality	School/team/country
1	2 (from Chi.)	Shekinna Stricklen	United States	Tennessee
2	22	Keisha Hampton	United States	DePaul

=== Transaction log ===
- April 11, 2011: The Storm acquired a second-round pick in the 2012 Draft from the Indiana Fever as part of the Katie Smith trade. In addition, the Storm traded a third-round pick to Indiana and a first-round pick to the Washington Mystics.
- January 2: The Storm acquired the second overall pick in the 2012 Draft from the Chicago Sky as part of the Swin Cash trade. The storm sent the 23rd overall pick to Chicago.
- January 31: The Storm re-signed Allie Quigley.
- February 6: The Storm signed Ann Wauters.
- February 9: The Storm re-signed Sue Bird and Tanisha Wright.
- February 14: The Storm traded Ashley Robinson to the Washington Mystics in exchange for Victoria Dunlap.
- February 15: The Storm re-signed Ewelina Kobryn and Katie Smith.
- February 27: The Seattle Storm signed Tina Thompson.
- March 9: The Storm signed Rachel Allison and Alysha Clark.
- April 6: The Storm signed Silvia Dominguez.
- April 12: The Storm signed Lindsay Taylor.
- April 26: The Storm signed Jacqua Williams, Ashley Corral, Dellena Criner, Ashley Gayle, and draft pick Shekinna Stricklen.
- May 1: The Storm waived Rachel Allison, Dellena Criner, and Jacqua Williams.
- May 14: The Storm waived Ashley Gayle and Lindsay Taylor.
- May 16: The Storm waived Ashley Corral and Allie Quigley.
- June 26: The Storm waived Victoria Dunlap.
- June 29: The Storm signed Svetlana Abrosimova.

=== Trades ===
Date	Trade	
January 2, 2012	To Seattle Storm	To Chicago Sky
January 2, 2012	Second pick in 2012 Draft	Swin Cash, Le'coe Willingham, and 23rd pick in 2012 Draft
February 14, 2012	To Seattle Storm	To Washington Mystics
February 14, 2012	Victoria Dunlap	Ashley Robinson

=== Personnel changes ===
==== Additions ====
Player	Signed	Former team
Ann Wauters	February 6, 2012	free agent
Tina Thompson	February 22, 2012	Los Angeles Sparks
Alysha Clark	March 9, 2012	free agent
Shekinna Stricklen	April 16, 2012	draft pick
Svetlana Abrosimova	June 29, 2012	free agent

==== Subtractions ====
Player	Left	New team
Belinda Snell	2012	free agent
Swin Cash	January 2, 2012	Chicago Sky
Le'coe Willingham	January 2, 2012	Chicago Sky
Ashley Robinson	February 14, 2012	Washington Mystics
Allie Quigley	May 16, 2012	free agent

== Roster ==
2012 Seattle Storm roster
Players
Coaches

Pos.	No.	Nat.	Name	Height	Weight	DOB	From	Yrs
F	25	(Russia)	Abrosimova, Svetlana	6' 2" (1.88m)	169 lb (77kg)	1980-07-09	Connecticut	9
G	10	(United States)	Bird, Sue	5' 9" (1.75m)	150 lb (68kg)	1980-10-16	Connecticut	10
F	32	(United States)	Clark, Alysha	5' 10" (1.78m)	167 lb (76kg)	1987-07-07	Middle Tennessee	R
F/C	15	(Australia)	Jackson, Lauren	6' 5" (1.96m)	187 lb (85kg)	1981-05-11	Australia	11
F/C	11	(Poland)	Kobryn, Ewelina	6' 3" (1.91m)	210 lb (95kg)	1982-05-07	Poland	1
F	20	(United States)	Little, Camille	6' 2" (1.88m)	180 lb (82kg)	1985-01-18	North Carolina	5
G	14	(United States)	Smith, Katie	5' 11" (1.8m)	175 lb (79kg)	1974-06-04	Ohio State	13
G/F	40	(United States)	Stricklen, Shekinna	6' 2" (1.88m)	178 lb (81kg)	1990-07-30	Tennessee	R
F	7	(United States)	Thompson, Tina	6' 2" (1.88m)	178 lb (81kg)	1975-02-10	USC	15
C	12	(Belgium)	Wauters, Ann	6' 4" (1.93m)	193 lb (88kg)	1980-10-12	Belgium	7
G	30	(United States)	Wright, Tanisha	5' 11" (1.8m)	165 lb (75kg)	1983-11-29	Penn State	7

Head coach
(United States) Brian Agler (Wittenberg)
Assistant coaches
(United States) Jenny Boucek (Virginia)
(United States) Nancy Darsch (Springfield)
Athletic trainer
(United States) Tom Spencer (Central Washington)
Strength and conditioning coach
(United States) Melissa Hardin (Western Washington)

Legend

- (C) Team captain
- (DP) Unsigned draft pick
- (FA) Free agent
- (S) Suspended
- Injured

=== Depth ===
Pos.	Starter	Bench
C	Ann Wauters	Ewelina Kobryn; Lauren Jackson
PF	Camille Little	Tina Thompson
SF	Katie Smith	Shekinna Stricklen; Svetlana Abrosimova
SG	Tanisha Wright	Alysha Clark
PG	Sue Bird

== Season standings ==
Western Conference	W	L	PCT	GB	Home	Road	Conf.
Minnesota Lynx ^{z}	27	7	.794	–	16–1	11–6	17–5
Los Angeles Sparks ^{x}	24	10	.706	3.0	16–1	8–9	15–7
San Antonio Silver Stars ^{x}	21	13	.618	6.0	12–5	9–8	14–8
Seattle Storm ^{x}	16	18	.471	11.0	10–7	6–11	11–11
Tulsa Shock ^{o}	9	25	.265	18.0	6–11	3–14	5–17
Phoenix Mercury ^{o}	7	27	.206	20.0	3–14	4–13	4–18

== Schedule ==
=== Preseason ===
2012 Game Log: Preseason (May)

Game	Date	Time (ET)	Opponent	TV	Score	High points	High rebounds	High assists	Location/Attendance	Record
1	Fri 11	12:30	@ Tulsa		60-86	Dunlap (13)	Thompson (6)	Smith (3)	BOK Center; 5,297	0-1
2	Sun 13	5:00	Los Angeles		61-60	Stricklen (15)	Thompson (5)	Wright (8)	KeyArena; 4,628	1-1

=== Regular season ===
2012 Game Log: Regular Season
May (0–3)

Game	Date	Time (ET)	Opponent	TV	Score	High points	High rebounds	High assists	Location/Attendance	Record
1	Fri 18	10:00	Los Angeles	NBATV; KONG; KDOC	66-72	Wauters (17)	Thompson (8)	Bird (6)	KeyArena; 9,686	0-1
2	Tue 22	10:30	@ Los Angeles	KONG; KDOC	61-74	Wauters (15)	Wauters (8)	Bird (5)	Staples Center; 9,238	0-2
3	Sun 27	7:00	@ Minnesota		71-84	Wauters (13)	Wauters (9)	Bird (9)	Target Center; 7,832	0-3

June (6–5)

Game	Date	Time (ET)	Opponent	TV	Score	High points	High rebounds	High assists	Location/Attendance	Record
4	Fri 1	10:00	Tulsa		76-58	Bird (27)	Little (9)	Wright (4)	KeyArena; 7,489	1-3
5	Sun 3	8:30	@ Los Angeles	KONG; KDOC	65-67	Smith (19)	Wauters (7)	Bird (6)	Staples Center; 12,639	1-4
6	Wed 6	8:00	@ Minnesota		55-79	Wright (14)	Dunlap; Wauters (5)	Bird; Wright (3)	Target Center; 8,263	1-5
7	Sat 9	8:00	@ San Antonio	FS-SW	67-80	Stricklen (14)	Little; Stricklen; Wauters (8)	Wright (6)	AT&T Center; 8,187	1-6
8	Wed 13	8:00	@ Chicago	CN100	58-74	Thompson (13)	Wauters (8)	Bird (10)	Allstate Arena; 4,681	1-7
9	Fri 15	8:00	@ Tulsa		86-73	Bird (21)	Bird (7)	Wright (7)	BOK Center; 5,100	2-7
10	Sun 17	9:00	Minnesota		65-62	Bird (21)	Smith; Thompson (5)	Wright (8)	KeyArena; 8,349	3-7
11	Fri 22	10:00	San Antonio		82-76	Wright (20)	Thompson (9)	Wright (7)	KeyArena; 6,849	4-7
12	Sun 24	7:00	Washington		72-55	Bird; Wauters (14)	Wauters (7)	Bird; Wright (5)	KeyArena; 6,979	5-7
13	Tue 26	7:00	@ Washington	ESPN2	79-71	Bird (25)	Wauters (7)	Bird; Little (3)	Verizon Center; 6,645	6-7
14	Sat 30	4:00	@ New York	NBATV	59-77	Thompson; Wauters (10)	Little (7)	Bird (4)	Prudential Center; 6,724	6-8

July (3–2)

Game	Date	Time (ET)	Opponent	TV	Score	High points	High rebounds	High assists	Location/Attendance	Record
15	Sun 1	5:00	@ Connecticut	CPTV-S	89-83 (OT)	Little (27)	Little (9)	Bird (8)	Mohegan Sun Arena; 9,201	7-8
16	Sat 7	10:00	@ Los Angeles	ESPN2	59-83	Little (12)	Thompson (7)	Wright (8)	Staples Center; 12,229	7-9
17	Sun 8	9:00	Phoenix		83-68	Bird (31)	Little (9)	Wright (5)	KeyArena; 8,639	8-9
18	Wed 11	3:00	Atlanta		59-70	Stricklen (16)	Stricklen (9)	Bird (8)	KeyArena; 9,686	8-10
19	Fri 13	10:00	@ Phoenix		83-64	Smith (19)	Stricklen (11)	Bird (9)	US Airways Center; 7,647	9-10
Summer Olympic break

August (2–4)

Game	Date	Time (ET)	Opponent	TV	Score	High points	High rebounds	High assists	Location/Attendance	Record
Summer Olympic break
20	Thu 16	10:00	Phoenix	KONG	72-58	Little (17)	Little (6)	Wright (8)	KeyArena; 6,987	10-10
21	Sat 18	10:00	Los Angeles	NBATV; KDOC	71-82	Wright (21)	Clark (6)	Wright (4)	KeyArena; 9,127	10-11
22	Tue 21	10:00	Minnesota	ESPN2	73-86	Little (20)	Little; Stricklen (5)	Bird (4)	KeyArena; 6,169	10-12
23	Thu 23	10:00	Indiana		66-68	Little (15)	Little (8)	Wright (5)	KeyArena; 5,819	10-13
24	Sun 26	9:00	New York		84-66	Bird (18)	Little (8)	Bird (10)	KeyArena; 6,459	11-13
25	Thu 30	10:00	Phoenix	KONG	68-75	Little (11)	Wright (8)	Bird (8)	KeyArena; 6,379	11-14

September (5–4)

Game	Date	Time (ET)	Opponent	TV	Score	High points	High rebounds	High assists	Location/Attendance	Record
26	Thu 6	10:00	Tulsa		101-74	Jackson (23)	Stricklen (8)	Wright (8)	KeyArena; 5,948	12-14
27	Sat 8	8:00	@ Tulsa		89-66	Little (28)	Little (9)	Wright (7)	BOK Center; 7,415	13-14
28	Tue 11	7:00	@ Atlanta	NBATV; FS-S	61-77	Jackson (14)	Jackson (9)	Bird (6)	Philips Arena; 5,558	13-15
29	Wed 12	7:00	@ Indiana	NBATV	48-72	Abrosimova (11)	Jackson (10)	Smith (3)	Bankers Life Fieldhouse; 6,337	13-16
30	Fri 14	8:00	@ San Antonio	NBATV	66-90	Thompson; Wauters (12)	Wauters (9)	4 players (4)	AT&T Center; 7,109	13-17
31	Sun 16	9:00	Connecticut	KONG; CPTV-S	58-60	Stricklen (12)	Smith (8)	Wright (8)	KeyArena; 7,748	13-18
32	Tue 18	10:00	Chicago		75-60	Wauters (16)	Wauters; Stricklen (8)	Bird (8)	KeyArena; 6,459	14-18
33	Fri 21	10:00	San Antonio		84-75	Smith (16)	Wauters (13)	Smith (6)	KeyArena; 8,494	15-18
34	Sun 23	3:00	@ Phoenix	ESPN2	71-57	Little (14)	Little (8)	Smith (5)	US Airways Center; 7,576	16-18

All games are viewable on WNBA LiveAccess or ESPN3.com

=== Postseason ===
2012 Game Log: Postseason
Western Conference Semifinals

Game	Date	Time (ET)	Opponent	TV	Score	High points	High rebounds	High assists	Location/Attendance	Series
1	September 28	9:00	@ Minnesota	ESPN2	70-78	Stricklen (13)	Stricklen; Thompson (7)	Wright (7)	Target Center; 9,213	0-1
2	September 30	9:00	Minnesota	ESPN	86-79 (2OT)	Bird (22)	Jackson (14)	Bird; Wright (7)	KeyArena; 8,479	1-1
3	October 2	9:00	@ Minnesota	ESPN2	72-73	Bird (19)	Jackson (6)	Bird (11)	Target Center; 8,023	1-2
