= Curt Miller =

American basketball executive and coach (born 1968)

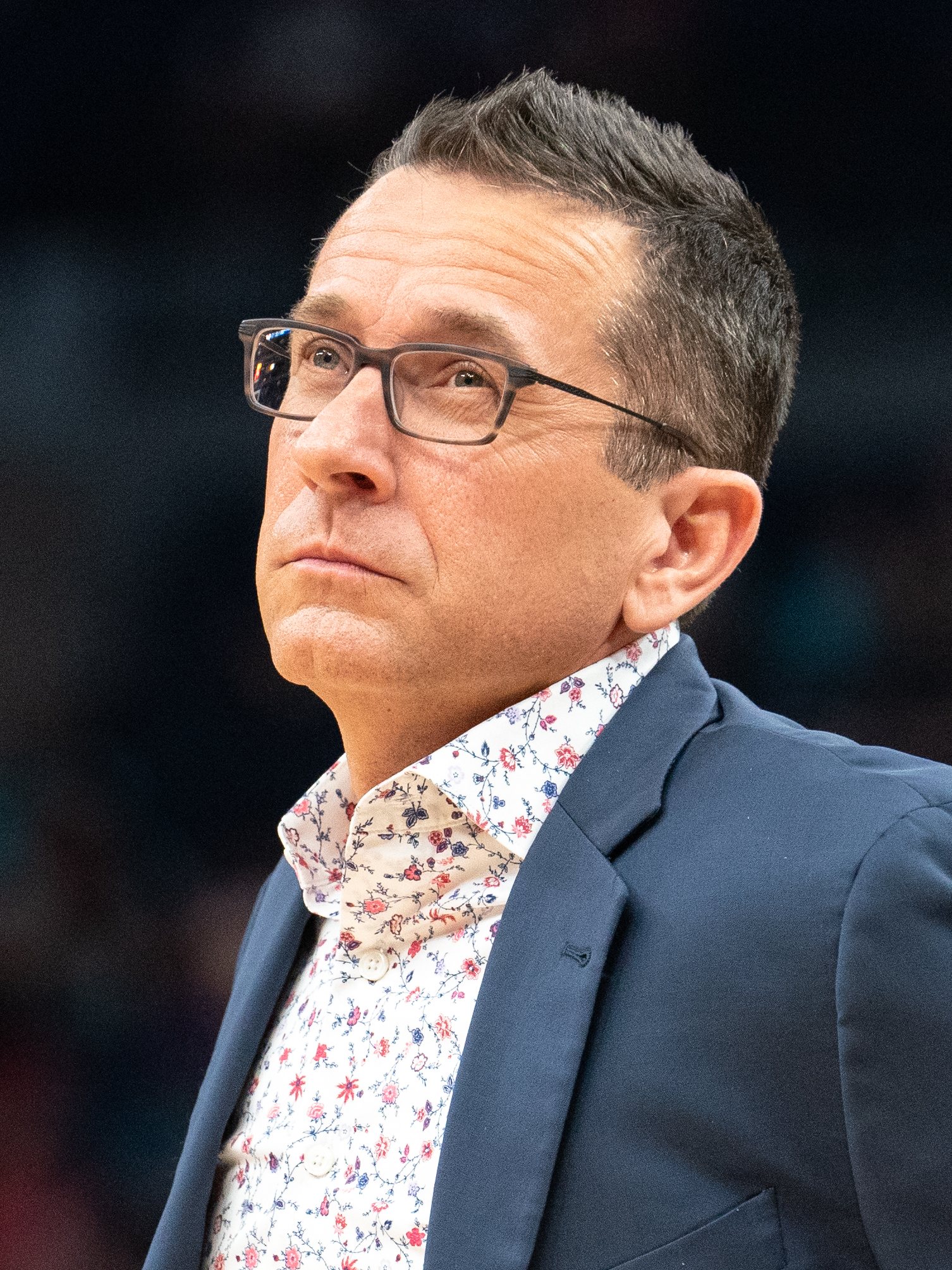
- Miller in 2019

Dallas Wings
- Positions: Executive vice president and general manager
- League: WNBA

Personal information
- Born: October 5, 1968 (age 58) Girard, Pennsylvania, U.S.

Career information
- College: Baldwin Wallace
- Coaching career: 1991–2024

Career history

Coaching
- 1991–1994: Cleveland State (assistant)
- 1994–1998: Syracuse (assistant)
- 1998–2001: Colorado State (assistant)
- 2001–2012: Bowling Green
- 2012–2014: Indiana
- 2015: Los Angeles Sparks (assistant)
- 2016–2022: Connecticut Sun
- 2023–2024: Los Angeles Sparks

Career highlights
- WNBA Basketball Executive of the Year (2017); 2× WNBA Coach of the Year (2017, 2021); 5× MAC regular season championships (2005, 2006, 2009, 2010, 2012); 5× MAC tournament championships (2005, 2006, 2009, 2010, 2012)

Curt Miller (born October 6, 1968) is an American basketball executive and coach who is the executive vice-president and general manager of the Dallas Wings of the WNBA. He most recently served as the head coach of the Los Angeles Sparks from 2023–2024. Other previous head coaching positions include the Connecticut Sun (2016–2022), Bowling Green State University (2001–2012), and Indiana University (2012–2014). Miller also served as an assistant coach to Brian Agler with the Los Angeles Sparks in 2015.

== Assistant coaching career ==
Miller served as an assistant coach at Colorado State. He also served as an assistant at Cleveland State and Syracuse.

On March 31, 2015, the Los Angeles Sparks hired Miller as an assistant coach.

== Head coaching career ==
=== Bowling Green ===
During his tenure at Bowling Green he compiled a 258–92 record including 135–41 in the Mid-American Conference. He was named MAC Coach of the Year 6 times, and won the conference regular season title 8 straight times between 2005–2012. His best season came in 2006 when he led the Falcons to a 31–4 mark, including a sweet sixteen appearance in the NCAA tournament.

=== Indiana University ===
After an opening for head coach of the women's basketball team occurred at Indiana University in 2012, he got the position. Miller resigned on July 25, 2014 citing health and family reasons.

=== Connecticut Sun ===
After one season as an assistant with the Los Angeles Sparks, Miller returned to the head coaching ranks. He was announced as the new head coach of the Connecticut Sun on December 17, 2015. On September 2, 2016, Sun announced that Miller would also assume the role of general manager. In his second season with the Sun in 2017 he was named WNBA Coach of the Year and the inaugural WNBA Basketball Executive of the Year. His 2019 team made the WNBA finals but lost to the Washington Mystics in five games. The Sun were knocked out in the Semifinals in 2020. His 2021 team finished the regular season in first place with a 26–6 record, but were upset in the Semifinals by the Chicago Sky. He was named WNBA Coach of the Year for the second time in 2021. His 2022 team made the WNBA finals once again, but lost to the Las Vegas Aces in four games.

=== Los Angeles Sparks ===
On October 17, 2022, Miller was announced as the new head coach of the Los Angeles Sparks.

On September 24, 2024, Miller parted ways with the Los Angeles Sparks after an 8–32 record on the 2024 season and a 25–55 record over two seasons, with the team missing the WNBA Playoffs both years.

== Executive career ==
On November 8, 2024, the Dallas Wings had hired Miller to be their executive vice-president and general manager.

== Head coaching record ==
=== NCAA ===
Record table
Season	Team	Overall	Conference	Standing	Postseason
Bowling Green Falcons (Mid-American Conference) (2001–2012)
2001–02	Bowling Green	9–19	6–10	4th (East)	
2002–03	Bowling Green	12–16	5–11	T-6th (West)	
2003–04	Bowling Green	21–10	11–5	T-2nd (West)	
2004–05	Bowling Green	23–8	11–5	1st (West)	NCAA 1st Round
2005–06	Bowling Green	28–3	16–0	1st (East)	NCAA 1st Round
2006–07	Bowling Green	31–4	16–1	1st (East)	NCAA Sweet Sixteen
2007–08	Bowling Green	26–8	13–3	1st (East)	WNIT Second Round
2008–09	Bowling Green	29–5	15–1	1st (East)	WNIT Third Round
2009–10	Bowling Green	27–7	14–2	1st (East)	NCAA 1st Round
2010–11	Bowling Green	28–5	13–3	1st (East)	NCAA 1st Round
2011–12	Bowling Green	24–7	14–2	1st (East)	WNIT First Round
Bowling Green:		258–92 (.737)	135–41 (.767)		
Indiana Hoosiers (Big Ten Conference) (2012–2014)
2012–13	Indiana	11–19	2–14	12th	
2013–14	Indiana	21–13	5–11	T-8th	WNIT Quarterfinals
Indiana:		32–32 (.500)	7–25 (.219)		
Total:		290–124 (.700)			
National champion Postseason invitational champion Conference regular season champion Conference regular season and conference tournament champion Division regular season champion Division regular season and conference tournament champion Conference tournament champion

=== WNBA ===
Legend
Regular season	G	Games coached	W	Games won	L	Games lost	W–L %	Win–loss %
Playoffs	PG	Playoff games	PW	Playoff wins	PL	Playoff losses	PW–L %	Playoff win–loss %

Team	Year	G	W	L	W–L%	Finish	PG	PW	PL	PW–L%	Result
Connecticut Sun	2016	34	14	20	.412	5th in East	—	—	—	—	Missed Playoffs
Connecticut Sun	2017	34	21	13	.618	2nd in East	1	0	1	.000	Lost in Eastern Conference Semi-Finals
Connecticut Sun	2018	34	21	13	.618	3rd in East	1	0	1	.000	Lost in Eastern Conference Semi-Finals
Connecticut Sun	2019	34	23	11	.676	2nd in East	8	5	3	.625	Lost in WNBA Finals
Connecticut Sun	2020	22	10	12	.455	2nd in East	7	4	3	.571	Lost in Semifinals
Connecticut Sun	2021	32	26	6	.813	1st in East	4	1	3	.250	Lost in Semifinals
Connecticut Sun	2022	36	25	11	.694	2nd in East	12	6	6	.500	Lost in WNBA Finals
Los Angeles Sparks	2023	40	17	23	.425	4th in West	—	—	—	—	Missed Playoffs
Los Angeles Sparks	2024	40	8	32	.200	5th in West	—	—	—	—	Missed Playoffs
Career		302	161	141	.533		33	16	17	.485	
