= 2017 WNBA season =

- League: Women's National Basketball Association
- Sport: Basketball
- Duration: May 3 – September 17, 2017
- Games: 34
- Teams: 12
- Total attendance: 1,574,078
- Average attendance: 7,716
- TV partner(s): ABC, ESPN, ESPN2, NBA TV

Draft
- Top draft pick: (United States) Kelsey Plum
- Picked by: San Antonio Stars

Regular season
- Top seed: Minnesota Lynx
- Season MVP: (United States) Sylvia Fowles (Minnesota)
- Top scorer: (United States) Brittney Griner (Phoenix)

Playoffs
- Finals champions: Minnesota Lynx
- Runners-up: Los Angeles Sparks
- Finals MVP: (United States) Sylvia Fowles (Minnesota)

WNBA seasons
- ← 2016 2018 →

The 2017 WNBA season was the 21st season of the Women's National Basketball Association (WNBA). Its regular season began on May 13 with three games, highlighted by the defending WNBA champion Los Angeles Sparks hosting the Seattle Storm. It concluded on September 3. The playoffs began on September 6, and concluded on October 4, with the Minnesota Lynx defeating the Sparks in five games to win their fourth WNBA title.

It was the final season for the San Antonio Stars in the city that they had called home since 2003. After the season, parent company Spurs Sports & Entertainment sold the team to MGM Resorts International, which moved the team to Las Vegas. The former Stars now play as the Las Vegas Aces.

== Draft ==
The San Antonio Stars selected Kelsey Plum first in the 2017 WNBA Draft. The draft was televised nationally on the ESPN networks (Round 1 on ESPN2, Rounds 2 and 3 on ESPNU).

== Arena changes ==
Two teams announced temporary arena changes for the 2017 season, both due to their regular arenas undergoing renovations during the WNBA season.

- The Atlanta Dream announced that they would move from Philips Arena to McCamish Pavilion on the campus of the Georgia Institute of Technology for the 2017 and 2018 seasons.
- The Minnesota Lynx announced that they would move from Target Center to the Xcel Energy Center in St. Paul for the 2017 season.

== Regular season ==
=== Standings ===
#	Eastern Conference	W	L	PCT	GB	Home	Road	Conf.
1	New York Liberty - (3)	22	12	.647	-	13–4	9–8	10–6
2	Connecticut Sun - (4)	21	13	.636	1	12–5	9–6	10–6
3	Washington Mystics - (6)	18	16	.529	4	11–6	7–10	12-4
4	Chicago Sky - e	12	22	.353	10	4–13	8–9	6–10
5	Atlanta Dream - e	12	22	.353	10	9–8	3–14	5–11
6	Indiana Fever - e	9	25	.265	13	6–11	3–14	4–12

#	Western Conference	W	L	PCT	GB	Home	Road	Conf.
1	Minnesota Lynx - (1)	27	7	.794	–	15–2	12–5	13–3
2	Los Angeles Sparks - (2)	26	8	.765	1	16–1	10–7	12–4
3	Phoenix Mercury - (5)	18	16	.529	9	9–8	9–8	7–9
4	Dallas Wings - (7)	16	18	.471	11	10–7	6–11	7–9
5	Seattle Storm - (8)	15	19	.441	12	10–7	5–12	8–8
6	San Antonio Stars - e	8	26	.235	19	6–11	2–15	1–15

Notes

(#) – Conference Standing
Playoff Seeds shown next to team name
e – Eliminated from playoffs

== Playoffs ==
**First round** Single elimination (Sept. 6)
5	**Phoenix Mercury**	**79**
8	Seattle Storm	69
6	**Washington Mystics**	**86**
7	Dallas Wings	76

**Second round** Single elimination (Sept. 10)
4	Connecticut Sun	83
5	**Phoenix Mercury**	**88**
3	New York Liberty	68
6	**Washington Mystics**	**82**

**Semifinals**; Best-of-5 (Sept. 12 – Sept. 17)
2	**Los Angeles Sparks**	**3**
5	Phoenix Mercury	0
1	**Minnesota Lynx**	**3**
6	Washington Mystics	0

**WNBA Finals**; Best-of-5 (Sept. 24 – Oct. 4)
1	**Minnesota Lynx**	**3**
2	Los Angeles Sparks	2

Note: Teams re-seeded after second round and semi-finals.

- **Bold** – Game or series winner
- Italic – Team with home-court advantage

== Individual statistic leaders ==
=== Regular season ===
Category	Player	Team	Statistic
Points per game	Brittney Griner	Phoenix Mercury	21.9 PPG
Rebounds per game	Jonquel Jones	Connecticut Sun	11.9 RPG
Assists per game	Courtney Vandersloot	Chicago Sky	8.1 APG
Steals per game	Alana Beard	Los Angeles Sparks	2.1 SPG
Blocks per game	Brittney Griner	Phoenix Mercury	2.5 BPG
Field goal percentage	Sylvia Fowles	Minnesota Lynx	65.5%
Three point percentage	Chelsea Gray	Los Angeles Sparks	48.2%
Free throw percentage	Elena Delle Donne	Washington Mystics	95.3%

=== Playoffs ===
Category	Player	Team	Statistic
Points per game	Breanna Stewart	Seattle Storm	23.0 PPG
Rebounds per game	Jonquel Jones	Connecticut Sun	15.0 RPG
Assists per game	Chelsea Gray	Los Angeles Sparks	6.7 APG
Steals per game	Jewell Loyd	Seattle Storm	3.0 SPG
Blocks per game	Courtney Paris; Candace Parker; Breanna Stewart	Dallas Wings; Los Angeles Sparks; Seattle Storm	2.0 BPG
Field goal percentage	8 Tied	Various	100%
Three point percentage	Rebecca Allen; Rachel Banham	New York Liberty; Connecticut Sun	100%
Free throw percentage	18 Tied	Various	100%

== Awards ==
=== Individual ===
Award		Winner	Team	Position	Votes/Statistic
Most Valuable Player (MVP)		Sylvia Fowles	Minnesota Lynx	Center	35 of 40
Finals MVP		Sylvia Fowles	Minnesota Lynx	Center	
Rookie of the Year		Allisha Gray	Dallas Wings	Guard	30 of 40
Most Improved Player		Jonquel Jones	Connecticut Sun	Forward/Center	32 of 40
Defensive Player of the Year		Alana Beard	Los Angeles Sparks	Guard	28 of 40
Sixth Woman of the Year		Sugar Rodgers	New York Liberty	Guard	15 of 40
Kim Perrot Sportsmanship Award		Sue Bird	Seattle Storm	Guard	20 of 40
Peak Performers	**Scoring**	Brittney Griner	Phoenix Mercury	Center	21.9 PPG
Peak Performers	**Rebounding**	Jonquel Jones	Connecticut Sun	Center	11.9 RPG
Peak Performers	**Assists**	Courtney Vandersloot	Chicago Sky	Guard	8.1 APG
Coach of the Year		Curt Miller	Connecticut Sun	Coach	36 of 40
Basketball Executive of the Year		Curt Miller	Connecticut Sun	General manager	6 of 12

=== Team ===
Award		Guard	Guard	Forward	Forward	Center
**All-WNBA**	**First Team**	Skylar Diggins-Smith	Maya Moore	Candace Parker	Tina Charles	Sylvia Fowles
**All-WNBA**	**Second Team**	Chelsea Gray	Diana Taurasi	Nneka Ogwumike	Jonquel Jones	Brittney Griner
**All-Defensive**	**First Team**	Jasmine Thomas	Alana Beard	Nneka Ogwumike	Tina Charles	Sylvia Fowles
**All-Defensive**	**Second Team**	Briann January	Maya Moore	Alyssa Thomas	Rebekkah Brunson	Brittney Griner
**All-Rookie Team**		Allisha Gray	Brittney Sykes	Kelsey Plum	Kaela Davis	Shatori Walker-Kimbrough

=== Players of the Week ===
Week ending	Eastern Conference		Western Conference	
Week ending	Player	Team	Player	Team
May 22	Layshia Clarendon	Atlanta Dream	Sylvia Fowles (2)	Minnesota Lynx
May 29	Epiphanny Prince	New York Liberty	Sylvia Fowles (2)	Minnesota Lynx
June 4	Tina Charles (2)	New York Liberty	Diana Taurasi	Phoenix Mercury
June 11	Tina Charles (2)	New York Liberty	Sylvia Fowles (3)	Minnesota Lynx
June 18	Jonquel Jones	Connecticut Sun	Candace Parker	Los Angeles Sparks
June 25	Alyssa Thomas	Connecticut Sun	Skylar Diggins-Smith	Dallas Wings
July 2	Jasmine Thomas	Connecticut Sun	Candace Parker (2)	Los Angeles Sparks
July 9	Alyssa Thomas (2)	Connecticut Sun	Brittney Griner	Phoenix Mercury
July 16	Stefanie Dolson	Chicago Sky	Breanna Stewart	Seattle Storm
July 23	Tina Charles (4)	New York Liberty	Sylvia Fowles (4)	Minnesota Lynx
July 30	Tina Charles (4)	New York Liberty	Candace Parker (3)	Los Angeles Sparks
August 7	Courtney Vandersloot	Chicago Sky	Glory Johnson	Dallas Wings
August 14	Jonquel Jones (2)	Connecticut Sun	Sylvia Fowles (5)	Minnesota Lynx
August 21	Tina Charles (7)	New York Liberty	Breanna Stewart (2)	Seattle Storm
August 28	Tina Charles (7)	New York Liberty	Candace Parker (4)	Los Angeles Sparks
September 5	Tina Charles (7)	New York Liberty	Brittney Griner (2)	Phoenix Mercury

=== Players of the Month ===
Month	Eastern Conference		Western Conference	
Month	Player	Team	Player	Team
May	Tiffany Hayes	Atlanta Dream	Sylvia Fowles (3)	Minnesota Lynx
June	Jonquel Jones	Connecticut Sun	Sylvia Fowles (3)	Minnesota Lynx
July	Tina Charles (2)	New York Liberty	Sylvia Fowles (3)	Minnesota Lynx
August	Tina Charles (2)	New York Liberty	Candace Parker	Los Angeles Sparks

=== Rookies of the Month ===
Month	Player	Team
May	Allisha Gray (2)	Dallas Wings
June	Allisha Gray (2)	Dallas Wings
July	Brittney Sykes (2)	Atlanta Dream
August	Brittney Sykes (2)	Atlanta Dream

=== Coaches of the Month ===
Month	Coach	Team
May	Cheryl Reeve	Minnesota Lynx
June	Brian Agler	Los Angeles Sparks
July	Curt Miller	Connecticut Sun
August	Bill Laimbeer	New York Liberty

== Coaches ==
=== Eastern Conference ===
Team	Head coach	Previous job	Years with team	Record with team	Playoff appearances	Finals Appearances	WNBA Championships
Atlanta Dream	Michael Cooper	USC	3	51–51	1	0	0
Chicago Sky	Amber Stocks	Los Angeles Sparks (assistant)	0	0–0	0	0	0
Connecticut Sun	Curt Miller	Los Angeles Sparks (assistant)	1	14–20	0	0	0
Indiana Fever	Pokey Chatman	Chicago Sky	0	0–0	0	0	0
New York Liberty	Bill Laimbeer	Minnesota Timberwolves (assistant)	4	70–66	3	0	0
Washington Mystics	Mike Thibault	Connecticut Sun	4	64–72	3	0	0

=== Western Conference ===
Team	Head coach	Previous job	Years with team	Record with team	Playoff appearances	Finals Appearances	WNBA Championships
Dallas Wings	Fred Williams	Atlanta Dream	3	41–61	1	0	0
Los Angeles Sparks	Brian Agler	Seattle Storm	2	40–28	2	1	1
Minnesota Lynx	Cheryl Reeve	Detroit Shock (assistant)	7	168–70	6	5	3
Phoenix Mercury	Sandy Brondello	Los Angeles Sparks (assistant)	3	65–37	3	1	1
San Antonio Stars	Vickie Johnson	San Antonio Stars (assistant)	0	0–0	0	0	0
Seattle Storm	Jenny Boucek	Seattle Storm (assistant)	10	26–42	1	0	0

Notes:

- Year with team does not include 2017 season.
- Records are from time at current team and are through the end the 2016 season.
- Playoff appearances are from time at current team only.
- WNBA Finals and Championships do not include time with other teams.
- Coaches shown are the coaches who began the 2017 season as head coach of each team.
