= Minnesota Lynx accomplishments and records =

This page details the all-time statistics, records, and other achievements pertaining to the Minnesota Lynx.

== Franchise Leaders ==
(As of the end of the 2025 season)

Bold denotes still active with team.

Italic denotes still active, but not with team.

=== Games Played ===
Most Games Played
Player	Games
Seimone Augustus	370
Lindsay Whalen	283
Maya Moore	271
Rebekkah Brunson	261
Sylvia Fowles	222
**Bridget Carleton**	215
Katie Smith	205
Svetlana Abrosimova	204
**Napheesa Collier**	193
Tamika Williams	185

=== Points ===
Most Points
Player	Points
Seimone Augustus	5,881
Maya Moore	4,984
Katie Smith	3,605
**Napheesa Collier**	3,542
Sylvia Fowles	3,488
Lindsay Whalen	3,233
**Kayla McBride**	2,531
Rebekkah Brunson	2,463
Svetlana Abrosimova	2,036
Nicole Ohlde	1,695

=== Minutes Played ===
Most Minutes Played
Player	Minutes
Seimone Augustus	10,918
Maya Moore	8,466
Lindsay Whalen	7,799
Katie Smith	7,287
Rebekkah Brunson	7,213
Sylvia Fowles	6,561
**Napheesa Collier**	6,461
**Kayla McBride**	5,598
Svetlana Abrosimova	5,245
**Bridget Carleton**	4,767

=== Rebounds ===
Most Rebounds
Player	Rebounds
Sylvia Fowles	2,175
Rebekkah Brunson	2,158
Maya Moore	1,589
**Napheesa Collier**	1,510
Seimone Augustus	1,191
Tamika Williams	1,028
Lindsay Whalen	982
Svetlana Abrosimova	898
Nicole Ohlde	898
**Jessica Shepard**	813

=== Assists ===
Most Assists
Player	Assists
Lindsay Whalen	1,381
Maya Moore	895
Seimone Augustus	886
**Napheesa Collier**	570
Katie Smith	496
**Courtney Williams**	492
**Kayla McBride**	484
Svetlana Abrosimova	439
Rebekkah Brunson	391
**Bridget Carleton**	351

=== Steals ===
Most Steals
Player	Steals
Maya Moore	451
**Napheesa Collier**	325
Svetlana Abrosimova	284
Sylvia Fowles	281
Seimone Augustus	269
Rebekkah Brunson	266
Lindsay Whalen	225
Nicky Anosike	218
**Kayla McBride**	203
Katie Smith	191

=== Blocks ===
Most Blocks
Player	Blocks
Sylvia Fowles	345
**Napheesa Collier**	239
Maya Moore	176
Rebekkah Brunson	176
Vanessa Hayden	155
**Alanna Smith**	137
Nicole Ohlde	134
Seimone Augustus	130
Devereaux Peters	114
Nicky Anosike	103

=== Field Goals ===
Field Goals Made
Player	Field Goals
Seimone Augustus	2,401
Maya Moore	1,782
Sylvia Fowles	1,404
**Napheesa Collier**	1,329
Lindsay Whalen	1,217
Katie Smith	1,127
Rebekkah Brunson	941
**Kayla McBride**	819
Svetlana Abrosimova	735
Nicole Ohlde	590

=== 3-Pointers Made ===
Most 3-Pointers Made
Player	3-Pointers Made
Maya Moore	530
Katie Smith	460
**Kayla McBride**	399
Seimone Augustus	281
**Bridget Carleton**	262
Candice Wiggins	207
**Napheesa Collier**	188
Svetlana Abrosimova	187
Rachel Banham	153
Damiris Dantas	132

=== Free Throws ===
Most Free Throws Made
Player	Free Throws
Katie Smith	891
Maya Moore	890
Seimone Augustus	798
Lindsay Whalen	716
**Napheesa Collier**	696
Sylvia Fowles	680
Rebekkah Brunson	538
Nicole Ohlde	515
**Kayla McBride**	494
Svetlana Abrosimova	379

== Individual awards ==
WNBA MVP

- Maya Moore – 2014
- Sylvia Fowles – 2017

WNBA Rookie of the Year

- Betty Lennox – 2000
- Seimone Augustus – 2006
- Maya Moore – 2011
- Napheesa Collier – 2019
- Crystal Dangerfield – 2020

WNBA Defensive Player of the Year

- Sylvia Fowles – 2016, 2021
- Napheesa Collier - 2024

Sixth Woman of the Year

- Candice Wiggins – 2008

Coach of the Year

- Suzie McConnell-Serio – 2004
- Cheryl Reeve – 2011, 2016, 2020, 2024

Dawn Staley Community Leadership Award

- Charde Houston – 2011

All-WNBA First Team

- Katie Smith – 2001, 2003
- Lindsay Whalen – 2011, 2013 (Note: Whalen and Augustus both named to 2011 All-WNBA Teams: Lindsay Whalen - 1st Team; Seimone Augustus - 2nd Team) (Note: Whalen, Moore, and Augustus both named to 2013 All-WNBA Teams: Maya Moore and Lindsay Whalen - 1st Team; Seimone Augustus - 2nd Team)
- Seimone Augustus – 2012 (Note: Augustus, Whalen, Moore all named to 2012 All-WNBA Team: Seimone Augustus - 1st Team; Maya Moore and Lindsay Whalen - 2nd Team)
- Maya Moore – 2013, 2014, 2015, 2016, 2017 (Note: Moore, Whalen, and Augustus all named to 2014 All-WNBA Team: Maya Moore - 1st Team; Lindsay Whalen and Seimone Augustus - 2nd Team) (Note: Moore and Fowles all named to 2016 All-WNBA Team: Maya Moore - 1st Team; Sylvia Fowles - 2nd Team) (Note: Fowles and Moore both named to 2017 All-WNBA Team: Sylvia Fowles and Maya Moore - 1st Team)
- Sylvia Fowles – 2017
- Napheesa Collier – 2023

All-WNBA Second Team

- Betty Lennox – 2000 (Note: Lennox and Smith both named to 2000 All-WNBA Team: Betty Lennox and Katie Smith - 2nd Team)
- Katie Smith – 2000, 2002
- Seimone Augustus – 2006, 2007, 2011, 2013, 2014
- Lindsay Whalen – 2012, 2014
- Maya Moore – 2012, 2018
- Sylvia Fowles – 2016, 2021, 2022
- Odyssey Sims – 2019
- Napheesa Collier – 2020

WNBA All-Defensive First Team

- Nicky Anosike – 2009
- Rebekkah Brunson – 2011
- Sylvia Fowles – 2016, 2017, 2021, 2022 (Note: Fowles, Brunson, and Moore all named to 2017 All-Defensive Team: Sylvia Fowles - 1st Team; Rebekkah Brunson and Maya Moore - 2nd Team)
- Napheesa Collier – 2024

WNBA All-Defensive Second Team

- Rebekkah Brunson – 2010, 2013, 2017, 2018 (Note: Brunson and Fowles both named to 2018 All-Defensive Team: Rebekkah Brunson and Sylvia Fowles - 2nd Team)
- Maya Moore – 2014, 2017
- Sylvia Fowles — 2018
- Napheesa Collier – 2020, 2023
- Alanna Smith – 2024

WNBA All-Rookie Team

- Seimone Augustus – 2006
- Lindsey Harding – 2007
- Nicky Anosike – 2008 (Note: Wiggins and Anosike Named to the 2008 All-Rookie Team: Nicky Anosike and Candice Wiggins Name 2008 Rookie Team)
- Candice Wiggins – 2008
- Renee Montgomery – 2009
- Monica Wright – 2010
- Maya Moore – 2011
- Napheesa Collier - 2019
- Crystal Dangerfield – 2020
- Diamond Miller – 2023
- Dorka Juhász – 2023

Finals MVP

- Seimone Augustus – 2011
- Maya Moore – 2013
- Sylvia Fowles - 2015, 2017

=== WNBA All-Star ===
WNBA All-Star Selections

- Tonya Edwards – 1999
- Betty Lennox – 2000
- Katie Smith – 2000, 2001, 2002, 2003, 2004, 2005
- Seimone Augustus – 2006, 2007, 2011, 2013, 2014, 2015, 2017, 2018
- Nicky Anosike – 2009
- Charde Houston – 2009
- Rebekkah Brunson – 2010, 2011, 2013, 2017, 2018
- Lindsay Whalen - 2010, 2011, 2013, 2014, 2015
- Maya Moore – 2011, 2013, 2014, 2015, 2017, 2018
- Sylvia Fowles – 2017, 2018, 2019, 2021
- Napheesa Collier – 2019, 2021, 2023, 2024, 2025
- Odyssey Sims – 2019
- Kayla McBride - 2024, 2025
- Courtney Williams – 2025

WNBA All-Star Game Head Coach

- Cheryl Reeve – 2013, 2014, 2017, 2024, 2025

WNBA All-Star Game MVP

- Maya Moore – 2015, 2017, 2018

=== WNBA Career Awards ===
WNBA All-Decade Team

- Katie Smith

Top 15@15

- Katie Smith

WNBA Top 20@20

- Katie Smith
- Seimone Augustus
- Maya Moore
- Lindsay Whalen

Top 25

- Katie Smith
- Seimone Augustus
- Maya Moore
- Lindsay Whalen
- Sylvia Fowles

== Retired Numbers ==
Minnesota Lynx retired numbers
No.	Player	Position	Tenure	Date
13	Lindsay Whalen	G	2010–2018	June 8, 2019
23	Maya Moore	SF	2011–2018	August 24, 2024
32	Rebekkah Brunson	PF	2010–2018	July 3, 2022
33	Seimone Augustus	G	2006–2019	May 29, 2022
34	Sylvia Fowles	C	2015–2022	June 11, 2023

== Franchise Record for Championships ==
Championships
Championships	Seasons
WNBA Championships
4	2011, 2013, 2015, 2017
Conference Championships
6	2011, 2012, 2013, 2015, 2016, 2017
