= Alexis Jones (basketball) =

American basketball player (born 1994)

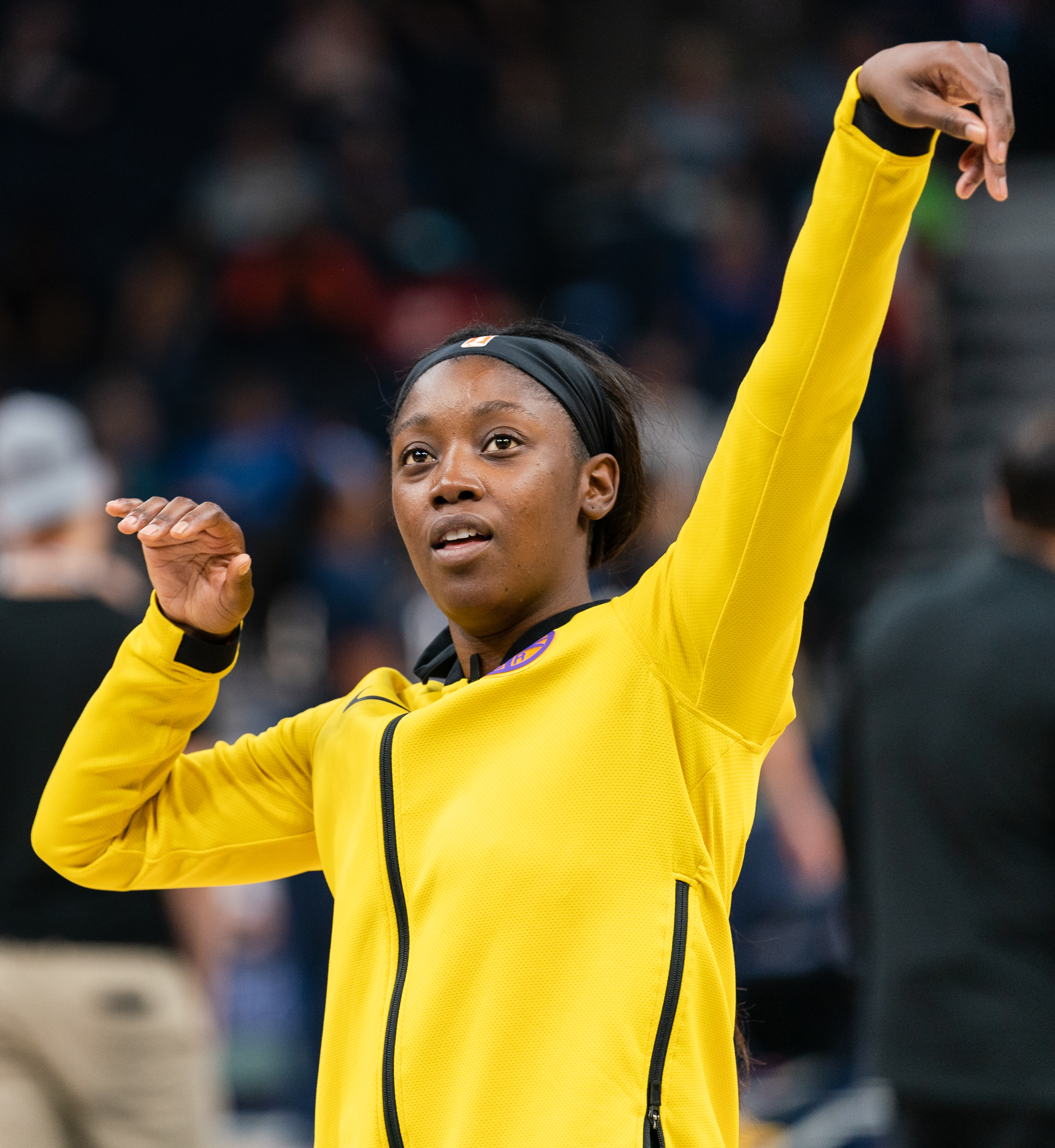
- Jones in 2019

Charlotte Crown
- Position: Guard
- League: UpShot League

Personal information
- Born: May 8, 1994 (age 32) Midland, Texas, U.S.
- Listed height: 5 ft 8 in (1.73 m)
- Listed weight: 173 lb (78 kg)

Career information
- High school: MacArthur (Irving, Texas)
- College: Duke (2012–2014); Baylor (2014–2017)
- WNBA draft: 2017: 1st round, 12th overall pick
- Drafted by: Minnesota Lynx
- Playing career: 2017–2020

Career history
- 2017–2019: Minnesota Lynx
- 2019–2020: Los Angeles Sparks
- 2020: Atlanta Dream
- 2020: Al-Qazeres Extremadura
- 2021–: Sparta&K
- 2026–present: Charlotte Crown

Career highlights
- WNBA champion (2017); 2× First-team All-Big 12 (2016, 2017); Big 12 Newcomer of the Year (2016); Big 12 Championship MOP (2016); ACC tournament MVP (2013); ACC All-Freshman Team (2013); McDonald's All-American (2012); 2× Texas Gatorade Player of the Year (2011, 2012); 2× Texas Miss Basketball (2011, 2012)
- Stats at WNBA.com
- Stats at Basketball Reference
Medals
Representing United States
Women's basketball
FIBA Under-19 World Cup
Gold medal – first place	2013 Lithuania	Team
Gold medal – first place	2011 Chile	Team
FIBA Under-18 Americas Championship
Gold medal – first place	2010 United States	Team

Alexis Jones (born May 8, 1994) is an American professional basketball player who played for the Charlotte Crown in the UpShot League. She was drafted in 2017 by the Lynx. Born in Midland, Texas, she played college basketball for Duke University, before she transferred to Baylor University.

== College career ==
=== Duke University ===
Coming out of high school, Jones was ranked the No. 3 overall recruit by ESPN and signed with Duke. During her freshman season, she started for the Blue Devils at the shooting guard position. When teammate and point guard, Chelsea Gray, went down with an injury, Jones moved over to the point guard position. Following her freshman season, Jones was named to the All-ACC Freshman of the Year, All-Freshman Team, the Norfolk All-Regional Team, and the ACC Tournament MVP. Jones became just the third freshman in ACC history to be named ACC Tournament MVP.

During her sophomore season, Jones started 28 games before tearing her ACL during a game versus Notre Dame. During a game versus Florida State, Jones tied the school record for assists in a single game with 15. She also received Second Team All-ACC status from the coaches for averaging 13.1 ppg, 5.3 apg, and 4.1 rpg, before her injury.

Following her sophomore campaign, Jones announced that she intended to transfer from Duke to be closer to home. Ultimately, Jones decided to transfer to Baylor University.

=== Baylor University ===
Due to the NCAA Transfer Rules, Jones sat out the 2014–2015 season for the Baylor Bears. This gave her time to recover from her ACL surgery that she had from her sophomore season.

During her junior season, Jones made her Baylor debut against UT-Arlington, where she recorded 15 points, 5 rebounds, 4 assists, and 2 steals. Her impact was felt right away at Baylor. She started in 34 of 38 games, was one of the three team MVPS, was named the Big 12 Newcomer of the Year, First Team All-Big 12, and was the Most Outstanding Player of the Big 12 Championship Tournament.

During her senior season, Jones once again made an impact on the Baylor season. She finished second in scoring and assists. But once again she had to sit out part of the season due to injury. Jones had gotten a bruised knee that caused her to miss time towards the end of the season. She was able to make it back in time for the NCAA Tournament. Despite the injury, Jones was named to the First Team All-Big 12 Team, which she received unanimously.

== Professional career ==
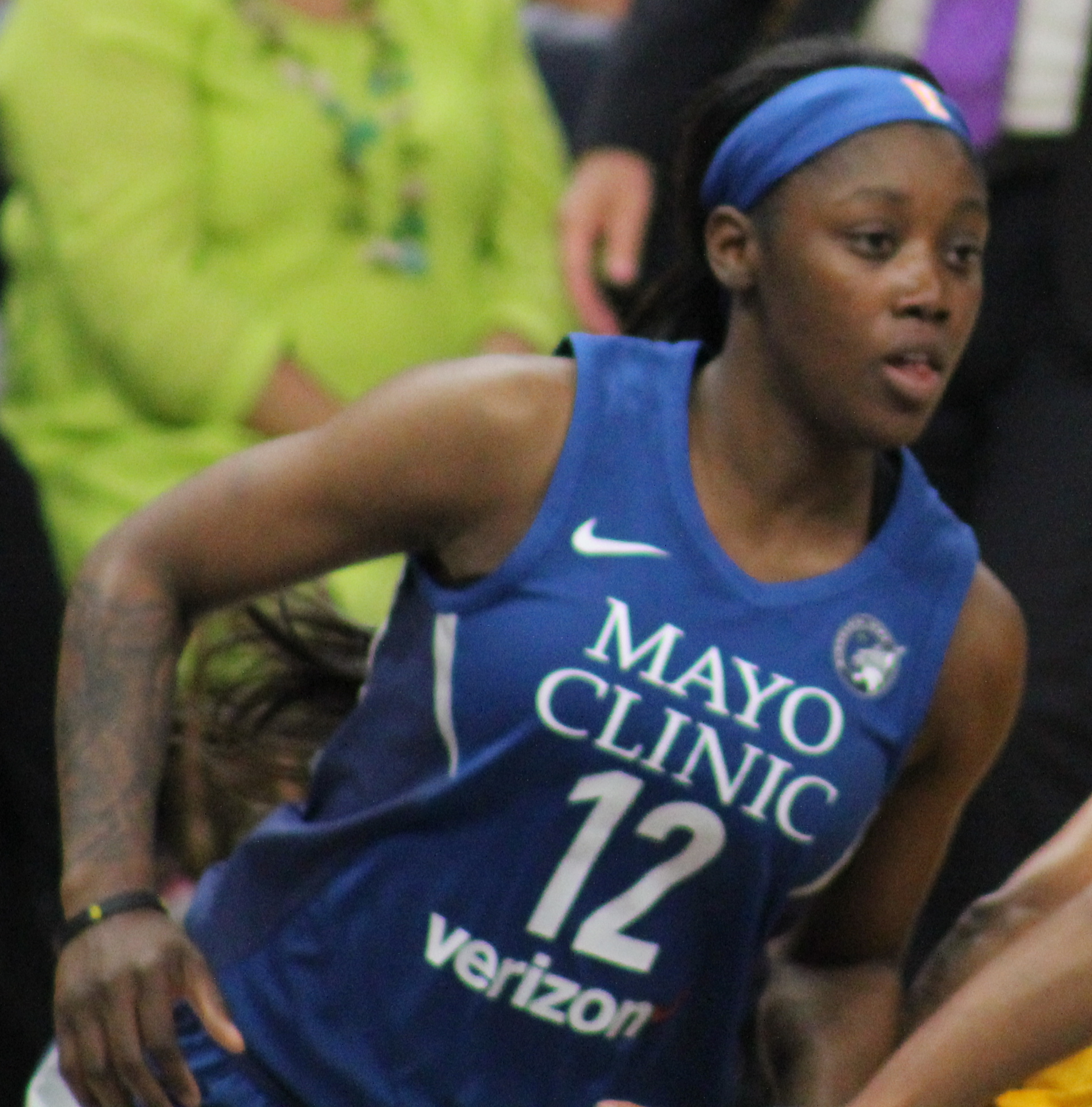
Jones in 2018

=== WNBA ===
==== Minnesota Lynx ====
Jones was selected 12th overall in the 2017 WNBA draft by the Minnesota Lynx. During Jones's rookie season with the Lynx, she saw limited action playing behind Lindsay Whalen and Renee Montgomery. She began playing more when Whalen went down with a hand injury. She finished the season averaging 2.6 points, 0.8 assists, and 0.8 rebounds per game. She was a member of the 2017 WNBA Championship team.

==== Los Angeles Sparks ====
On April 22, 2019, Jones was traded from the Lynx to the Los Angeles Sparks.

== Career statistics ==
Legend
GP	Games played	GS	Games started	MPG	Minutes per game	RPG	Rebounds per game
APG	Assists per game	SPG	Steals per game	BPG	Blocks per game	PPG	Points per game
TO	Turnovers per game	FG%	Field-goal percentage	3P%	3-point field-goal percentage	FT%	Free-throw percentage
**Bold**	Career best	°	League leader

†	Denotes seasons in which Jones won a WNBA championship

=== College ===
Year	Team	GP	Points	FG%	3P%	FT%	RPG	APG	SPG	BPG	PPG
2012-13	Duke	36	342	42.8	34.2	**79.5**	4.4	4.0	1.8	**0.3**	9.5
2013-14	Duke	28	366	**47.2**	38.8	78.8	4.1	**5.3**	**2.1**	0.1	13.1
2015-16	Baylor	38	**570**	43.5	**41.2**	76.4	4.2	4.4	2.0	0.0	**15.0**
2016-17	Baylor	30	397	41.6	41.1	72.2	**4.7**	4.8	1.2	0.3	13.2
Career	Duke	64	708	45.0	36.9	79.2	4.3	4.6	1.9	0.2	11.1
Career	Baylor	68	967	42.6	41.1	75.1	4.4	4.6	1.2	0.1	14.2

=== WNBA ===
==== Regular season ====
Year	Team	GP	GS	MPG	FG%	3P%	FT%	RPG	APG	SPG	BPG	TO	PPG
2017^{†}	Minnesota	**29**	0	7.3	.342	**.379**	**.857**	0.8	0.8	0.3	0.0	**0.7**	2.6
2018	Minnesota	26	0	8.8	.352	.320	.750	0.9	0.7	0.1	0.1	**0.7**	3.3
2019	Los Angeles	20	**1**	**12.2**	**.400**	.333	.800	**1.1**	**1.8**	0.3	**0.2**	1.4	**4.0**
2020	Atlanta	6	0	8.8	.381	.368	.500	0.0	0.8	**0.5**	0.0	1.0	**4.0**
Career	4 years, 3 teams	81	1	9.1	.364	.344	.795	0.8	1.0	0.2	0.1	0.9	3.3

==== Postseason ====
Year	Team	GP	GS	MPG	FG%	3P%	FT%	RPG	APG	SPG	BPG	TO	PPG
2017^{†}	Minnesota	**5**	0	6.0	.333	**.667**	.000	0.8	**1.4**	0.0	0.0	**0.4**	2.4
2018	Minnesota	1	0	0.0	–	–	–	0.0	0.0	0.0	0.0	1.0	0.0
2019	Los Angeles	3	0	**9.3**	**.375**	.333	**.750**	**1.0**	0.7	**0.3**	0.0	1.0	**3.3**
Career	3 years, 2 teams	9	0	6.4	.350	.556	.500	0.8	1.0	0.1	0.0	0.7	2.4

== Personal life ==
Jones' father, David, is paralyzed from the waist down due to a car accident in 2007 that resulting in their car being flipped three times and Alexis and her brother being thrown from the car. Alexis suffered a broken wrist in the accident.

Her younger brother, Andrew, played as a guard on the Texas Longhorns men's basketball team.
