= 2017 WNBA playoffs =

Professional women's basketball tournament

- Dates: September 6 – October 4, 2017

Final positions
- Champions: Minnesota Lynx
- Runners-up: Los Angeles Sparks

Tournament statistics
- Scoring leader (s): Sylvia Fowles (Minnesota) (18.6 PPG)

Awards
- MVP: Sylvia Fowles (Minnesota)

The 2017 WNBA playoffs was the postseason tournament of the WNBA's 2017 season.

== Format ==
Following the WNBA regular season, eight teams in the entire league qualified for the playoffs and were seeded one to eight. Regular season records determined the seedings of the teams. The team with the best record received seed one, the team with the next best record received seed two, and so on. The top two seeds get double byes, while the next two seeds get first-round byes.

These seedings were used to create a bracket that determines the match-ups throughout the playoffs. The first round of the playoffs consisted of two match-ups based on the seedings (5-8 and 6-7). The two winners advanced to the second round with a match-up between the number 3 seed and the lower of the advancing seeds and another match-up between the number 4 seed and the other first round winner. The winners of the first two rounds advanced to the semifinals, where the lower ranked seed of the winners faced the number 1 seed, while the other remaining team faced the number 2 seed.

The first two rounds are single elimination games played on the higher ranking seed's home court. The semifinals and WNBA Finals are best-of-five series played in a 2-2-1 format, meaning the team with home-court advantage (better record) hosts games 1, 2, and 5 while their opponent hosts games 3 and 4.

=== Tiebreak procedures ===
1. Better winning percentage among all head-to-head games involving tied teams.
2. Better winning percentage against teams within conference (for Finals only: better record against teams in # the opposite conference).
3. Better winning percentage against all teams with a .500 or better record at the end of the season.
4. Better point differential in games involving tied teams.
5. Coin toss (or draw of lots, if at least 3 teams are still tied after the first 4 tiebreakers fail).

== Playoff qualifying ==
Seed	Team	Record	Clinched		
Seed	Team	Record	Playoff berth	Bye to Semis	Top Record
1	Minnesota Lynx	27–7	Yes	Yes	Yes
2	Los Angeles Sparks	26–8	Yes	Yes	No
3	New York Liberty	22–12	Yes	No	No
4	Connecticut Sun	21–13	Yes	No	No
5	Phoenix Mercury	18–16	Yes	No	No
6	Washington Mystics	18–16	Yes	No	No
7	Dallas Wings	16–18	Yes	No	No
8	Seattle Storm	15–19	Yes	No	No

== Bracket ==
**First round** Single elimination (Sept. 6)
5	**Phoenix Mercury**	**79**
8	Seattle Storm	69
6	**Washington Mystics**	**86**
7	Dallas Wings	76

**Second round** Single elimination (Sept. 10)
4	Connecticut Sun	83
5	**Phoenix Mercury**	**88**
3	New York Liberty	68
6	**Washington Mystics**	**82**

**Semifinals**; Best-of-5 (Sept. 12 – Sept. 17)
2	**Los Angeles Sparks**	**3**
5	Phoenix Mercury	0
1	**Minnesota Lynx**	**3**
6	Washington Mystics	0

**WNBA Finals**; Best-of-5 (Sept. 24 – Oct. 4)
1	**Minnesota Lynx**	**3**
2	Los Angeles Sparks	2

Note: Teams re-seeded after second round and semi-finals.

- **Bold** – Game or series winner
- Italic – Team with home-court advantage

== First round ==
All times are in Eastern Daylight Time (UTC−4)

=== (6) Washington Mystics vs. (7) Dallas Wings ===
ESPN2

September 6
8:00 PM

Game 1

Dallas Wings 76, **Washington Mystics** **86**
Scoring by quarter: 12-**18**, **22**-16, 16-**25**, 26-**27**
Pts: Powers 21; Rebs: Johnson 14; Asts: four tied 3	Pts: Delle Donne 25; Rebs: Thomas 17; Asts: Meesseman 5
**Washington wins series 1-0**

Capital One Arena, Washington, D.C.
Attendance: 6,483
Referees: Tiara Cruse, Tim Greene, Tom Nunez

Regular-season series
Dallas won 2–1 in the regular-season series

June 6, 2017

Report

**Washington Mystics** **101**, Dallas Wings 89

College Park Center, Arlington, TX

June 18, 2017

Report

**Dallas Wings** **87**, Washington Mystics 83

Capital One Arena, Washington, D.C.

August 26, 2017

Report

**Dallas Wings** **83**, Washington Mystics 78

Capital One Arena, Washington, D.C.

=== (5) Phoenix Mercury vs. (8) Seattle Storm ===
ESPN2

September 6
10:00 PM

Game 1

Seattle Storm 69, **Phoenix Mercury** **79**
Scoring by quarter: **17**–16, 14–**16**, 15–**24**, 23-23
Pts: Stewart 23; Rebs: Stewart 8 Asts: Bird 5	Pts: Griner 23; Rebs: Griner 11; Asts: three tied 3
**Phoenix wins series 1-0**

Wells Fargo Arena, Temple, AZ
Attendance: 5,764
Referees: Tiffany Bird, Eric Brewton, Cheryl Flores, Kurt Walker

Regular-season series
Phoenix won 2–1 in the regular-season series

June 23, 2017

Report

**Phoenix Mercury** **85**, Seattle Storm 82

KeyArena, Seattle, WA

August 12, 2017

Report

**Seattle Storm** **98**, Phoenix Mercury 89

Talking Stick Resort Arena, Phoenix, AZ

August 27, 2017

Report

'Phoenix Mercury '**75**, Seattle Storm 71

KeyArena, Seattle, WA

== Second round ==
All times are in Eastern Daylight Time (UTC−4)

=== (4) Connecticut Sun vs. (5) Phoenix Mercury ===
ESPN2

September 10
3:00 PM

Game 1

**Phoenix Mercury** **88**, Connecticut Sun 83
Scoring by quarter: 18-**29**, **25**–21, **25**–18, **20**-15
Pts: Griner 26; Rebs: Griner 9 Asts: Mitchell 5	Pts: A. Thomas 20; Rebs: Jones 15; Asts: J. Thomas 4
**Phoenix wins series 1-0**

Mohegan Sun Arena, Uncasville, CT
Attendance: 8,420
Referees: Maj Forsberg, Roy Gulbeyan, Byron Jarrett

Regular-season series
Connecticut won 2–1 in the regular-season series

August 4, 2017

Report

Phoenix Mercury 92, **Connecticut Sun** **93**

Mohegan Sun Arena, Uncasville, CT

August 20, 2017

Report

Phoenix Mercury 66, **Connecticut Sun** **94**

Mohegan Sun Arena, Uncasville, CT

September 1, 2017

Report

Connecticut Sun 66, **Phoenix Mercury** **86**

Talking Stick Resort Arena, Phoenix, AZ

=== (3) New York Liberty vs. (6) Washington Mystics ===
ESPN2

September 10
5:00 PM

Game 1

**Washington Mystics** **82**, New York Liberty 68
Scoring by quarter: 10-**21**, **25**–20, **25**–10, **22**-17
Pts: Toliver 32; Rebs: Delle Donne 10; Asts: Ruffin-Pratt & Toliver 4	Pts: Charles 18; Rebs: Charles & Zellous 6 Asts: Hartley 5
**Washington wins series 1-0**

Madison Square Garden New York, New York
Attendance: 9,538
Referees: Sue Blauch, Billy Smith, Jeff Wooten

Regular-season series
New York won 2–1 in the regular-season series

June 29, 2017

Report

New York Liberty 54, **Washington Mystics** **67**

Capital One Arena, Washington, D.C.

July 16, 2017

Report

Washington Mystics 55, **New York Liberty** **85**

Madison Square Garden, New York, NY

August 25, 2017

Report

Washington Mystics 66, **New York Liberty** **74**

Madison Square Garden, New York, NY

== Semifinals ==
All times are in Eastern Daylight Time (UTC−4)

=== (1) Minnesota Lynx vs. (6) Washington Mystics ===
ESPN2

September 12
8:00 PM

Game 1

Washington Mystics 81, **Minnesota Lynx** **101**
Scoring by quarter: 18–**26**, 20-**27**, 18-**31**, **25**–17
Pts: Delle Donne 17; Rebs: Delle Donne 6 Asts: Toliver 6	Pts: Augustus 24; Rebs: Fowles 7 Asts: Moore 4

Williams Arena, Minneapolis, MN
Attendance: 7,834
Referees: JB DeRosa, Maj Forsberg, Billy Smith

ESPN2

September 14
8:00 PM

Game 2

Washington Mystics 83, **Minnesota Lynx** **93**
Scoring by quarter: **29**–19, 18-**26**, 17–**24**, 19–**24**
Pts: Delle Donne & Toliver 25; Rebs: Thomas 7 Asts: Toliver 6	Pts: Fowles 25; Rebs: Brunson 10; Asts: Whalen 7

Williams Arena, Minneapolis, MN
Attendance: 9,033
Referees: Sue Blauch, Roy Gulbeyan, Vladimir Voyard-Tadal

ESPN

September 17
3:00 PM

Game 3

**Minnesota Lynx** **81**, Washington Mystics 70
Scoring by quarter: **18**–16, 20–**23**, **21**–14, **22**–17
Pts: Moore 21; Rebs: Fowles 14; Asts: Moore & Whalen 5	Pts: Delle Donne 15; Rebs: Delle Donne 8 Asts: Toliver 5
**Minnesota wins series 3-0**

Capital One Arena, Washington, D.C.
Attendance: 7,950
Referees: Cheryl Flores, Kurt Walker, Jeff Wooten

Regular-season series
Minnesota won 3–0 in the regular-season series

June 9, 2017

Report

**Minnesota Lynx** **98**, Washington Mystics 73

Capital One Arena, Washington, D.C.

June 23, 2016

Report

Washington Mystics 76, **Minnesota Lynx** **93**

Xcel Energy Center, Saint Paul, MN

September 3, 2017

Report

Washington Mystics 72, **Minnesota Lynx** **86**

Xcel Energy Center, Saint Paul, MN

=== (2) Los Angeles Sparks vs. (5) Phoenix Mercury ===
ESPN2

September 12
10:00 PM

Game 1

Phoenix Mercury 66, **Los Angeles Sparks** **79**
Scoring by quarter: **23**–19, 19-**23**, 6-**14**, 18-**23**
Pts: Mitchell 19; Rebs: Little 11; Asts: Mitchell 4	Pts: Ogwumike 19; Rebs: Ogwumike 9 Asts: Gray 6

Staples Center, Los Angeles, CA
Attendance: 7,963
Referees: Tiffany Bird, Jeff Smith, Kurt Walker

ESPN2

September 14
10:00 PM

Game 2

Phoenix Mercury 72, **Los Angeles Sparks** **86**
Scoring by quarter: 19–**22**, 16-**21**, **20**-18, 17–**25**
Pts: Taurasi 21; Rebs: Mitchell 6 Asts: Taurasi 4	Pts: Parker 24; Rebs: Parker 13; Asts: Gray & Parker 6

Walter Pyramid, Long Beach, CA
Attendance: 4,023
Referees: Maj Forsberg, Byron Jarrett, Thomas Nunez

ESPN

September 17
5:00 PM

Game 3

**Los Angeles Sparks** **89**, Phoenix Mercury 87
Scoring by quarter: 21–**25**, **24**–13, 18–**24**, **26**–25
Pts: Sims 22; Rebs: Ogwumike 12; Asts: Parker 11	Pts: Taurasi 22; Rebs: Griner & Little 8 Asts: Mitchell & Taurasi 5
**Los Angeles wins series 3-0**

Talking Stick Resort Arena Phoenix, AZ
Attendance: 12,043
Referees: Sue Blauch, Eric Brewton, Billy Smith

Regular-season series
Los Angeles won 3–0 in the regular-season series

June 10, 2017

Report

**Los Angeles Sparks** **89**, Phoenix Mercury 87

Talking Stick Resort Arena, Phoenix, AZ

June 18, 2017

Report

Phoenix Mercury 59, **Los Angeles Sparks** **90**

Staples Center, Los Angeles, CA

August 24, 2017

Report

**Los Angeles Sparks** **82**, Phoenix Mercury 67

Talking Stick Resort Arena, Phoenix, AZ

== WNBA Finals ==
All times are in Eastern Daylight Time (UTC−4)

=== (1) Minnesota Lynx vs. (2) Los Angeles Sparks ===
ABC

September 24
3:30pm ET

Game 1

**Los Angeles Sparks** **85**, Minnesota Lynx 84
Scoring by quarter: **32**–11, 11–**22**, **25**–23, 17–**28**
Pts: Gray 27; Rebs: Parker 12; Asts: Gray 6	Pts: Moore 27; Rebs: Fowles 13; Asts: Whalen 6

Williams Arena, Minneapolis, MN
Attendance: 11,823
Referees: Cheryl Flores, Kurt Walker, Jeff Wooten

ESPN2

September 26
8:00pm ET

Game 2

Los Angeles Sparks 68, **Minnesota Lynx** **70**
Scoring by quarter: 10–**28**, 16–**17**, **24**–15, **18**–10
Pts: Parker 17; Rebs: Ogwumike 13; Asts: Parker 6	Pts: Whalen 14; Rebs: Fowles 17; Asts: Brunson, Whalen 3

Williams Arena, Minneapolis, MN
Attendance: 11,434
Referees: Maj Forsberg, Bryon Jarrett, Billy Smith

ESPN2

September 29
9:00pm ET

Game 3

Minnesota Lynx 64, **Los Angeles Sparks** **75**
Scoring by quarter: 8–**17**, **18**–15, 22–**24**, 16–**19**
Pts: Moore 16; Rebs: Fowles 11; Asts: Jones 4	Pts: Ogwumike, Sims 16; Rebs: Ogwumike 10; Asts: Gray 7

Staples Center, Los Angeles, CA
Attendance: 13,500
Referees: Sue Blauch, Eric Brewton, Roy Gulbeyan

ESPN

October 1
8:30pm ET

Game 4

**Minnesota Lynx** **80**, Los Angeles Sparks 69
Scoring by quarter: **21**–16, **22**–15, **18**–13, 19–**25**
Pts: Fowles 22; Rebs: Fowles 14; Asts: Whalen 8	Pts: Sims 18; Rebs: Ogwumike, Parker 8 Asts: Gray 9

Staples Center, Los Angeles, CA
Attendance: 13,500
Referees: Maj Forsberg, Billy Smith, Kurt Walker

ESPN

October 4
8:00pm ET

Game 5

Los Angeles Sparks 76, **Minnesota Lynx** **85**
Scoring by quarter: 19–**21**, 16–**20**, **21**–19, 20–**25**
Pts: Parker 19; Rebs: Parker 15; Asts: Gray 8	Pts: Moore 18; Rebs: Fowles 20; Asts: Whalen 8
**Minnesota wins series 3-2**

Williams Arena, Minneapolis, MN
Attendance: 14,632
Referees: Sue Blauch, Roy Gulbeyan, Byron Jarrett

Regular-season series
Los Angeles won 2–1 in the regular-season series

July 6, 2017

Report

Los Angeles Sparks 77, **Minnesota Lynx** **88**

Xcel Energy Center, Saint Paul, MN

August 11, 2016

Report

**Los Angeles Sparks** **70**, Minnesota Lynx 64

Xcel Energy Center, Saint Paul, MN

August 27, 2017

Report

Minnesota Lynx 67, **Los Angeles Sparks** **78**

Staples Center, Los Angeles, CA
