= 2017 Minnesota Lynx season =

- WNBA champions
- Head coach: Cheryl Reeve
- Arena: Xcel Energy Center (Regular Season); Williams Arena (Playoffs)

Results
- Record: 27–7 (.794)
- Place: 1st (Western)
- Playoff finish: WNBA Champions

Media
- Television: Fox Sports North, ESPN, NBATV

The 2017 Minnesota Lynx season was the 19th season for the Minnesota Lynx of the Women's National Basketball Association, and the 8th season under head coach Cheryl Reeve.

The Lynx finished the season with a record of 28–6, finishing first in the Western Conference (and the league as a whole) and qualifying for the playoffs, before ultimately beating Los Angeles in the WNBA Finals to win their league-tying best fourth championship.

The Lynx moved from their normal home, Target Center in Minneapolis, to the Xcel Energy Center in St. Paul for the 2017 season due to the renovation that would be taking place at Target Center. Due to the Minnesota Wild season beginning, the Lynx announced that the entirety of their playoff run would be played at the University of Minnesota's Williams Arena.

The Lynx opened the season on May 14 with a 70–61 victory over the Chicago Sky. Sylvia Fowles led the way with 26 points and 10 rebounds. During the May 20 game versus the Dallas Wings, Rebekkah Brunson recorded her 3,000th career rebound, becoming the fifth player in league history to do so. Cheryl Reeve was named the inaugural WNBA Coach of the Month for the month of May. Lindsay Whalen became the all-time winningest player in WNBA history with 295 wins, with a June 9 victory over the Washington Mystics. The win broke the tie with Swin Cash, giving Whalen first place in that category all by herself.

With the win against the San Antonio Stars on June 25, Seimone Augustus, Rebekkah Brunson, Maya Moore, and Lindsay Whalen became the winningest quartet in WNBA History with 122 wins, passing the Los Angeles Sparks quartet of Tamecka Dixon, Lisa Leslie, Mwadi Mabika, and Delisha Milton-Jones who recorded 121 from 1999 to 2004. During the July 6 victory over the Sparks, Maya Moore scored her 4,000th career point.

Four Lynx players were named to the West All-Star Team - Maya Moore, Sylvia Fowles, Seimone Augustus, Rebekkah Brunson. Moore and Fowles were named starters, while Augustus and Brunson were named reserves. Brunson was selected as a replacement player for the injured Brittney Griner. During the July 16 game versus the Phoenix Mercury, Sylvia Fowles scored her 4,000th career point. Sylvia Fowles recorded her 500th career block during the July 25 game versus the New York Liberty, becoming the seventh person in league history to do so. Fowles grabbed her 2,500th career rebound during the August 8 game versus the Atlanta Dream. She became the 10th player in league history to reach that milestone.

The Lynx unveiled their new logo, which will be used in the 2018 season, at the halftime of the August 11 game versus the Los Angeles Sparks.

The team made WNBA history with the 111–52 victory over the Indiana Fever, breaking the WNBA record for margin of victory (59), largest run (37-0), and largest halftime lead (45). They also broke Lynx franchise records for most points in a half (68) and most field goals in any half (27), while tying a record for most points in any quarter (37). During the same game, Jia Perkins passed Katie Douglas on the WNBA all-time steals list to move into fifth place. After beating the San Antonio Stars on August 25 to begin a 3-game road trip, the Lynx clinched a spot in the WNBA semifinals.

With their August 30 victory over the Indiana Fever, the Lynx recorded their 25th win of the season, which they have now done for six seasons in team history, tying a WNBA record. During the September 1 game versus the Chicago Sky, Maya Moore passed Katie Smith for the franchise record for career 3-pointers. On September 2, the WNBA and the Lynx announced that Minnesota would be the host of the 2018 WNBA All-Star Game. This would be the first time that the Lynx have hosted the All-Star Game. Following their regular season finale victory over the Washington Mystics, the Lynx clinched the overall top seed in the 2017 WNBA Playoffs.

By earning the top seed in the playoffs, the Lynx advanced to the semifinal round and faced the Washington Mystics. The Lynx swept the Mystics 3–0 to advance to the WNBA Finals. It is the Lynx's sixth time in seven years advancing to the Finals. The Lynx defeated the Los Angeles Sparks in 5 games to win their fourth WNBA championship in seven years, tying the now-defunct Houston Comets for most championship titles.

== Transactions ==
=== WNBA draft ===
| Round | Pick | Player | Nationality | School/team/country |
|---|---|---|---|---|
| 1 | 12 | Alexis Jones | United States | Baylor |
| 2 | 24 | Lisa Berkani | France | USO Mondeville (France) |
| 3 | 36 | Tahlia Tupaea | Australia | Sydney Uni Flames (Australia) |

=== Trades and roster changes ===
| Date | Trade |
|---|---|
| February 1, 2017 | Signed F Plenette Pierson |
| April 14, 2017 | Acquired the draft rights to F/C Chantel Oshaor from Chicago in exchange for Keisha Hampton |
| April 18, 2017 | Signed F Shao Ting |
| April 19, 2017 | Signed F Keyona Hayes |
| April 20, 2017 | Signed 1st Round Pick, G Alexis Jones |
| April 21, 2017 | Signed F/C Chantel Osahor, F Breanna Richardson, and G Moriah Mack |
| April 26, 2017 | Signed 2nd Round Pick, G Lisa Berkani |
| April 28, 2017 | Waived F Keyona Hayes |
| May 9, 2017 | Waived F/C Chantel Oshaor, F Breanna Richardson, and G Moriah Mack |
| May 12, 2017 | Waived F Shao Ting and Suspend G Lisa Berkani |
| August 28, 2017 | Signed F Cecilia Zandalasini |
| September 1, 2017 | Signed C Sylvia Fowles to a Multi-Year Extension |

== Roster ==
2017 Minnesota Lynx roster
Players
Coaches

| Pos. | No. | Nat. | Name | Height | Weight | DOB | From | Yrs |
|---|---|---|---|---|---|---|---|---|
| G/F | 33 | (United States) | Augustus, Seimone | 6' 0" (1.83m) | 170 lb (77kg) | 1984-04-30 | LSU | 12 |
| F | 32 | (United States) | Brunson, Rebekkah | 6' 2" (1.88m) | 185 lb (84kg) | 1981-12-11 | Georgetown | 14 |
| C | 34 | (United States) | Fowles, Sylvia | 6' 6" (1.98m) | 212 lb (96kg) | 1985-10-06 | LSU | 10 |
| F | 3 | (United States) | Howard, Natasha | 6' 2" (1.88m) | 165 lb (75kg) | 1991-09-02 | Florida State | 4 |
| G | 21 | (United States) | Montgomery, Renee | 5' 7" (1.7m) | 139 lb (63kg) | 1986-12-02 | Connecticut | 9 |
| F | 23 | (United States) | Moore, Maya | 6' 0" (1.83m) | 177 lb (80kg) | 1989-06-11 | Connecticut | 7 |
| G | 7 | (United States) | Perkins, Jia | 5' 8" (1.73m) | 165 lb (75kg) | 1982-02-23 | Texas Tech | 14 |
| G | 13 | (United States) | Whalen, Lindsay | 5' 9" (1.75m) | 173 lb (78kg) | 1982-05-09 | Minnesota | 14 |
| F/C | 22 | (United States) | Pierson, Plenette | 6' 2" (1.88m) | 195 lb (88kg) | 1981-08-31 | Texas Tech | 15 |
| G | 12 | (United States) | Jones, Alexis | 5' 9" (1.75m) | 173 lb (78kg) | 1994-05-08 | Baylor | R |
| C | 14 | (United Kingdom) | Fagbenle, Temi | 6' 4" (1.93m) | 197 lb (89kg) | 1992-09-08 | USC | R |
| F | 9 | (Italy) | Zandalasini, Cecilia | 6' 1" (1.85m) | 160 lb (73kg) | 1996-03-16 | Italy | R |

Head coach
(United States) Cheryl Reeve (La Salle)
Assistant coaches
(United States) Shelley Patterson (Washington State)
(United States) James Wade (Kennesaw State)
Athletic trainer
(United States) Chuck Barta (UW–La Crosse)
Assistant trainer
(United States) Kate Taber (Iowa)

Legend

- (C) Team captain
- (DP) Unsigned draft pick
- (FA) Free agent
- (S) Suspended
- Injured

=== Depth chart ===
| Pos. | Starter | Bench |
|---|---|---|
| C | Sylvia Fowles | Plenette Pierson; Temi Fagbenle |
| PF | Rebekkah Brunson | Natasha Howard |
| SF | Maya Moore | Cecilia Zandalasini |
| SG | Seimone Augustus | Jia Perkins |
| PG | Lindsay Whalen | Renee Montgomery; Alexis Jones |

== Schedule ==
=== Preseason ===
2017 pre-season game log
Total: 2–0 (Home: 1–0; Road: 1–0)
pre-season: 2–0 (Home: 1–0; Road: 1–0)

| Game | Date | Team | Score | High points | High rebounds | High assists | Location Attendance | Record |
|---|---|---|---|---|---|---|---|---|
| 1 | May 5 | Atlanta | W 113–67 | Natasha Howard (19) | Chantel Osahor (6) | Chantel Osahor; Alexis Jones (5) | Xcel Energy Center; 5,132 | 1–0 |
| 2 | May 8 | @ Washington | W 74–59 | Rebekkah Brunson (14) | Rebekkah Brunson (7) | Lindsay Whalen (5) | Verizon Center; 1,426 | 2–0 |

2017 season schedule

=== Regular season ===
2017 game log
Total: 27–7 (Home: 15–2; Road: 12–5)
May: 6–0 (Home: 3–0; Road: 3–0)

| Game | Date | Team | Score | High points | High rebounds | High assists | Location Attendance | Record |
|---|---|---|---|---|---|---|---|---|
| 1 | May 14 | Chicago | W 70–61 | Sylvia Fowles (26) | Sylvia Fowles (10) | Maya Moore (6) | Xcel Energy Center; 9,234 | 1–0 |
| 2 | May 18 | @ New York | W 90–71 | Maya Moore (16) | Maya Moore (11) | Maya Moore (6) | Madison Square Garden; 7,004 | 2–0 |
| 3 | May 20 | @ Dallas | W 89–87 | Sylvia Fowles (27) | Sylvia Fowles (13) | Lindsay Whalen (6) | College Park Center; 5,169 | 3–0 |
| 4 | May 23 | Connecticut | W 80–78 | Sylvia Fowles (21) | Sylvia Fowles (13) | Maya Moore (5) | Xcel Energy Center; 8,033 | 4–0 |
| 5 | May 26 | @ Connecticut | W 82–68 | Sylvia Fowles (20) | Maya Moore (11) | Seimone Augustus; Renee Montgomery (4) | Mohegan Sun Arena; 6,333 | 5–0 |
| 6 | May 28 | San Antonio | W 80–66 | Sylvia Fowles (14) | Sylvia Fowles (12) | Lindsay Whalen (10) | Xcel Energy Center; 9,034 | 6–0 |

June: 6–1 (Home: 2–1; Road: 4–0)

| Game | Date | Team | Score | High points | High rebounds | High assists | Location Attendance | Record |
|---|---|---|---|---|---|---|---|---|
| 7 | June 3 | @ Seattle | W 100–77 | Sylvia Fowles (26) | Sylvia Fowles; Seimone Augustus (7) | Maya Moore (4) | KeyArena; 7,576 | 7–0 |
| 8 | June 9 | @ Washington | W 98–73 | Sylvia Fowles (21) | Sylvia Fowles (11) | Maya Moore; Lindsay Whalen (6) | Verizon Center; 6,518 | 8–0 |
| 9 | June 11 | @ Dallas | W 91–74 | Sylvia Fowles (30) | Rebekkah Brunson (14) | Seimone Augustus (9) | College Park Center; 3,998 | 9–0 |
| 10 | June 17 | Connecticut | L 93–98 | Maya Moore (22) | Sylvia Fowles (7) | Rebekkah Brunson (5) | Xcel Energy Center; 10,121 | 9–1 |
| 11 | June 23 | Washington | W 93–76 | Maya Moore (22) | Sylvia Fowles (15) | Maya Moore (7) | Xcel Energy Center; 9,723 | 10–1 |
| 12 | June 25 | San Antonio | W 87–78 | Sylvia Fowles; Maya Moore (22) | Rebekkah Brunson; Sylvia Fowles (10) | Seimone Augustus (5) | Xcel Energy Center; 9,013 | 11–1 |
| 13 | June 30 | @ Phoenix | W 91–83 | Maya Moore (21) | Rebekkah Brunson (10) | Maya Moore (5) | Talking Stick Resort Arena; 11,330 | 12–1 |

July: 7–1 (Home: 5–0; Road: 2–1)

| Game | Date | Team | Score | High points | High rebounds | High assists | Location Attendance | Record |
|---|---|---|---|---|---|---|---|---|
| 14 | July 6 | Los Angeles | W 88–77 | Sylvia Fowles; Renee Montgomery (20) | Sylvia Fowles (13) | Renee Montgomery (4) | Xcel Energy Center; 9,821 | 13–1 |
| 15 | July 8 | @ Chicago | L 76–100 | Rebekkah Brunson (22) | Sylvia Fowles (6) | Lindsay Whalen (5) | Allstate Arena; 6,942 | 13–2 |
| 16 | July 14 | @ Phoenix | W 88–71 | Seimone Augustus; Maya Moore (19) | Sylvia Fowles (10) | Maya Moore (7) | Talking Stick Resort Arena; 10,493 | 14–2 |
| 17 | July 16 | Phoenix | W 81–66 | Sylvia Fowles (18) | Maya Moore (9) | Seimone Augustus (3) | Xcel Energy Center; 10,022 | 15–2 |
| 18 | July 19 | Dallas | W 100–74 | Sylvia Fowles (24) | Sylvia Fowles (12) | Seimone Augustus (9) | Xcel Energy Center; 17,834 | 16–2 |
| 19 | July 25 | New York | W 76–75 | Maya Moore (27) | Sylvia Fowles (9) | Seimone Augustus; Rebekkah Brunson; Plenette Pierson (3) | Xcel Energy Center; 10,123 | 17–2 |
| 20 | July 28 | @ Atlanta | W 90–80 | Sylvia Fowles (29) | Rebekkah Brunson; Sylvia Fowles (8) | Seimone Augustus (10) | McCamish Pavilion; 4,197 | 18–2 |
| 21 | July 30 | Seattle | W 93–82 | Sylvia Fowles (29) | Sylvia Fowles (12) | Jia Perkins (7) | Xcel Energy Center; 12,432 | 19–2 |

August: 6–5 (Home: 3–1; Road: 3–4)

| Game | Date | Team | Score | High points | High rebounds | High assists | Location Attendance | Record |
|---|---|---|---|---|---|---|---|---|
| 22 | August 3 | Atlanta | W 69–54 | Sylvia Fowles (25) | Sylvia Fowles (13) | Renee Montgomery (7) | Xcel Energy Center; 9,622 | 20–2 |
| 23 | August 6 | @ Indiana | L 82–84 | Maya Moore (28) | Rebekkah Brunson (12) | Seimone Augustus (4) | Bankers Life Fieldhouse; 8,226 | 20–3 |
| 24 | August 8 | @ Atlanta | W 81–72 | Sylvia Fowles (27) | Sylvia Fowles (13) | Renee Montgomery (6) | McCamish Pavilion; 4,006 | 21–3 |
| 25 | August 11 | Los Angeles | L 64–70 | Sylvia Fowles (17) | Sylvia Fowles (13) | Seimone Augustus (6) | Xcel Energy Center; 11,533 | 21–4 |
| 26 | August 16 | @ Seattle | L 61–62 | Maya Moore (15) | Sylvia Fowles (13) | Renee Montgomery (4) | KeyArena; 7,876 | 21–5 |
| 27 | August 18 | Indiana | W 111–52 | Sylvia Fowles (25) | Natasha Howard; Jia Perkins (7) | Seimone Augustus (8) | Xcel Energy Center; 9,621 | 22–5 |
| 28 | August 20 | @ New York | L 61–70 | Maya Moore (22) | Sylvia Fowles (15) | Renee Montgomery; Seimone Augustus; Plenette Pierson (3) | Madison Square Garden; 10,007 | 22–6 |
| 29 | August 22 | Phoenix | W 105–69 | Maya Moore (21) | Sylvia Fowles (10) | Renee Montgomery (7) | Xcel Energy Center; 10,723 | 23–6 |
| 30 | August 25 | @ San Antonio | W 89–70 | Maya Moore (24) | Sylvia Fowles (10) | Renee Montgomery (8) | AT&T Center; 7,950 | 24–6 |
| 31 | August 27 | @ Los Angeles | L 67–78 | Sylvia Fowles (17) | Sylvia Fowles (14) | Seimone Augustus (6) | Staples Center; 19,282 | 24–7 |
| 32 | August 30 | @ Indiana | W 80–69 | Maya Moore (18) | Sylvia Fowles (13) | Maya Moore; Seimone Augustus; Natasha Howard (3) | Bankers Life Fieldhouse; 7,625 | 25–7 |

September: 2–0 (Home: 2–0; Road: 0–0)

| Game | Date | Team | Score | High points | High rebounds | High assists | Location Attendance | Record |
|---|---|---|---|---|---|---|---|---|
| 33 | September 1 | Chicago | W 110–87 | Sylvia Fowles (27) | Sylvia Fowles (12) | Maya Moore (9) | Xcel Energy Center; 9,709 | 26–7 |
| 34 | September 3 | Washington | W 86–72 | Maya Moore (26) | Sylvia Fowles (8) | Sylvia Fowles (5) | Xcel Energy Center; 10,321 | 27–7 |

2017 season schedule

=== Playoffs ===
2017 playoff game log
Total: 6–2 (Home: 4–1; Road: 2–1)
WNBA Semifinals: 3–0 (Home: 2–0; Road: 1–0)

| Game | Date | Team | Score | High points | High rebounds | High assists | Location Attendance | Series |
|---|---|---|---|---|---|---|---|---|
| 1 | September 12 | Washington | W 101–81 | Seimone Augustus (24) | Sylvia Fowles (7) | Maya Moore (4) | Williams Arena; 7,834 | 1–0 |
| 2 | September 14 | Washington | W 93–83 | Sylvia Fowles (25) | Rebekkah Brunson (10) | Lindsay Whalen (7) | Williams Arena; 9,033 | 2–0 |
| 3 | September 17 | Washington | W 81–70 | Maya Moore (21) | Sylvia Fowles (14) | Lindsay Whalen; Maya Moore (5) | Capital One Arena; 7,950 | 3–0 |

WNBA Finals: 3–2 (Home: 2–1; Road: 1–1)

| Game | Date | Team | Score | High points | High rebounds | High assists | Location Attendance | Series |
|---|---|---|---|---|---|---|---|---|
| 1 | September 24 | Los Angeles | L 84–85 | Maya Moore (27) | Sylvia Fowles (13) | Lindsay Whalen (6) | Williams Arena; 11,823 | 0–1 |
| 2 | September 26 | Los Angeles | W 70–68 | Lindsay Whalen (14) | Sylvia Fowles (17) | Rebekkah Brunson; Lindsay Whalen (3) | Williams Arena; 11,434 | 1–1 |
| 3 | September 29 | Los Angeles | L 64–75 | Maya Moore (16) | Sylvia Fowles (11) | Alexis Jones (4) | Staples Center; 13,500 | 1–2 |
| 4 | October 1 | Los Angeles | W 80–69 | Sylvia Fowles (22) | Sylvia Fowles (14) | Lindsay Whalen (8) | Staples Center; 13,500 | 2–2 |
| 5 | October 4 | Los Angeles | W 85–76 | Maya Moore (18) | Sylvia Fowles (20) | Lindsay Whalen (8) | Williams Arena; 14,632 | 3–2 |

2017 playoff schedule

== Statistics ==
=== Regular season ===
| Player | GP | GS | MPG | FG% | 3P% | FT% | PPG | RPG | APG | SPG | BPG |
|---|---|---|---|---|---|---|---|---|---|---|---|
| Sylvia Fowles | 34 | 34 | 30.8 | .655 | .000 | .768 | 18.9 | 10.4 | 1.5 | 1.3 | 2.0 |
| Maya Moore | 34 | 34 | 31.3 | .442 | .411 | .858 | 17.3 | 5.0 | 3.5 | 1.9 | 0.4 |
| Seimone Augustus | 32 | 32 | 27.7 | .502 | .432 | .868 | 10.9 | 2.9 | 4.0 | 0.6 | 0.1 |
| Rebekkah Brunson | 30 | 30 | 26.9 | .449 | .348 | .711 | 10.2 | 6.7 | 1.5 | 1.1 | 0.4 |
| Lindsay Whalen | 22 | 22 | 23.6 | .451 | .353 | .750 | 8.0 | 2.5 | 4.1 | 0.5 | 0.1 |
| Renee Montgomery | 34 | 12 | 21.9 | .424 | .358 | .842 | 8.0 | 1.6 | 3.4 | 0.7 | 0.1 |
| Plenette Pierson | 34 | 4 | 13.7 | .427 | .339 | .792 | 5.2 | 2.2 | 1.5 | 0.4 | 0.1 |
| Natasha Howard | 34 | 0 | 11.7 | .484 | .214 | .733 | 4.3 | 2.4 | 0.7 | 0.5 | 0.6 |
| Jia Perkins | 34 | 2 | 16.3 | .369 | .316 | .833 | 4.2 | 2.0 | 1.4 | 1.1 | 0.0 |
| Alexis Jones | 29 | 0 | 7.3 | .342 | .379 | .857 | 2.6 | 0.8 | 0.8 | 0.3 | 0.0 |
| Temi Fagbenle | 21 | 0 | 4.2 | .500 | .000 | .778 | 1.2 | 1.0 | 0.0 | 0.1 | 0.2 |
| Cecilia Zandalasini | 3 | 0 | 6.3 | .250 | .000 | .000 | 0.7 | 0.3 | 0.0 | 0.0 | 0.0 |

=== Playoffs ===
| Player | GP | GS | MPG | FG% | 3P% | FT% | PPG | RPG | APG | SPG | BPG |
|---|---|---|---|---|---|---|---|---|---|---|---|
| Sylvia Fowles | 8 | 8 | 35.4 | .631 | .000 | .559 | 18.6 | 13.1 | 1.5 | 1.6 | 2.0 |
| Maya Moore | 8 | 8 | 33.4 | .515 | .542 | .730 | 18.3 | 5.3 | 3.0 | 1.8 | 0.4 |
| Seimone Augustus | 8 | 8 | 31.8 | .490 | .526 | .500 | 13.9 | 4.8 | 3.5 | 0.4 | 0.5 |
| Rebekkah Brunson | 8 | 8 | 28.0 | .361 | .111 | .793 | 9.5 | 6.0 | 1.6 | 1.1 | 0.5 |
| Lindsay Whalen | 8 | 8 | 22.9 | .457 | .222 | .789 | 7.4 | 2.0 | 4.9 | 0.5 | 0.1 |
| Renee Montgomery | 8 | 0 | 17.1 | .449 | .393 | .500 | 7.0 | 1.3 | 1.9 | 0.5 | 0.3 |
| Plenette Pierson | 8 | 0 | 5.4 | .364 | .500 | .000 | 1.1 | 0.8 | 0.5 | 0.1 | 0.1 |
| Natasha Howard | 7 | 0 | 5.6 | .200 | .000 | .800 | 1.1 | 0.9 | 0.0 | 0.3 | 0.0 |
| Jia Perkins | 8 | 0 | 15.8 | .333 | .286 | 1.000 | 3.3 | 2.0 | 0.9 | 0.8 | 0.1 |
| Alexis Jones | 5 | 0 | 6.0 | .333 | .667 | .000 | 2.4 | 0.8 | 1.4 | 0.0 | 0.0 |
| Temi Fagbenle | 2 | 0 | 2.0 | .667 | .000 | .000 | 2.0 | 0.5 | 0.0 | 0.0 | 0.0 |
| Cecilia Zandalasini | 5 | 0 | 2.2 | 1.000 | .000 | .000 | 0.4 | 0.0 | 0.2 | 0.0 | 0.0 |

== Standings ==
| # | Western Conference | W | L | PCT | GB | Home | Road | Conf. |
|---|---|---|---|---|---|---|---|---|
| 1 | Minnesota Lynx - **(1)** | 27 | 7 | .794 | – | 15–2 | 12–5 | 13–3 |
| 2 | Los Angeles Sparks - **(2)** | 26 | 8 | .765 | 1 | 16–1 | 10–7 | 12–4 |
| 3 | Phoenix Mercury - **(5)** | 18 | 16 | .529 | 9 | 9–8 | 9–8 | 7–9 |
| 4 | Dallas Wings - **(7)** | 16 | 18 | .471 | 11 | 10–7 | 6–11 | 7–9 |
| 5 | Seattle Storm - **(8)** | 15 | 19 | .441 | 12 | 10–7 | 5–12 | 8–8 |
| 6 | San Antonio Stars - **e** | 8 | 26 | .235 | 19 | 6–11 | 2–15 | 1–15 |

=== Playoffs ===
**First round** Single elimination (Sept. 6)
5 | **Phoenix Mercury** | **79**
8 | Seattle Storm | 69
6 | **Washington Mystics** | **86**
7 | Dallas Wings | 76

**Second round** Single elimination (Sept. 10)
4 | Connecticut Sun | 83
5 | **Phoenix Mercury** | **88**
3 | New York Liberty | 68
6 | **Washington Mystics** | **82**

**Semifinals**; Best-of-5 (Sept. 12 – Sept. 17)
2 | **Los Angeles Sparks** | **3**
5 | Phoenix Mercury | 0
1 | **Minnesota Lynx** | **3**
6 | Washington Mystics | 0

**WNBA Finals**; Best-of-5 (Sept. 24 – Oct. 4)
1 | **Minnesota Lynx** | **3**
2 | Los Angeles Sparks | 2

Note: Teams re-seeded after second round and semi-finals.

- **Bold** – Game or series winner
- Italic – Team with home-court advantage

== Awards and milestones ==
| Recipient | Award/Milestone | Date Awarded |
|---|---|---|
| Rebekkah Brunson | 3,000th Career Rebound | May 20 |
| Sylvia Fowles | Player of the Week | May 13–21; May 22–28; June 5–11; July 17–23; August 7–13 |
| Minnesota Lynx | Tied WNBA All-Time Record for Consecutive Wins in May (23 Straight) | May |
| Sylvia Fowles | Player of the Month | May; June; July |
| Cheryl Reeve | Coach of the Month | May |
| Lindsay Whalen | Became WNBA's All-Time Winningest Player (295 Wins) | June 9 |
| Seimone Augustus, Rebekkah Brunson, Maya Moore, Lindsay Whalen | Became WNBA's Winningest Quartet (122 Wins) | June 25 |
| Maya Moore | 4,000th Career Point | July 6 |
| Maya Moore; Sylvia Fowles | All-Star Starters | July 11 |
| Sylvia Fowles | 4,000th Career Point | July 16 |
| Seimone Augustus | All-Star Reserve | July 18 |
| Rebekkah Brunson | All-Star Reserve | July 19 |
| Maya Moore | All-Star Game MVP | July 22 |
| Sylvia Fowles | 500th Career Block | July 25 |
| Sylvia Fowles | 2,500th Career Rebound | August 8 |
| Maya Moore | Franchise Record for Career 3-Pointers (461) | September 1 |
| Sylvia Fowles | 1st Team All-Defense | September 12 |
| Rebekkah Brunson; Maya Moore | 2nd Team All-Defense | September 12 |
| Sylvia Fowles | MVP | September 14 |
| Sylvia Fowles; Maya Moore | 1st Team All-WNBA | September 29 |
| Sylvia Fowles | Finals MVP | October 5 |
