= Seimone Augustus =

American basketball coach and player (born 1984)

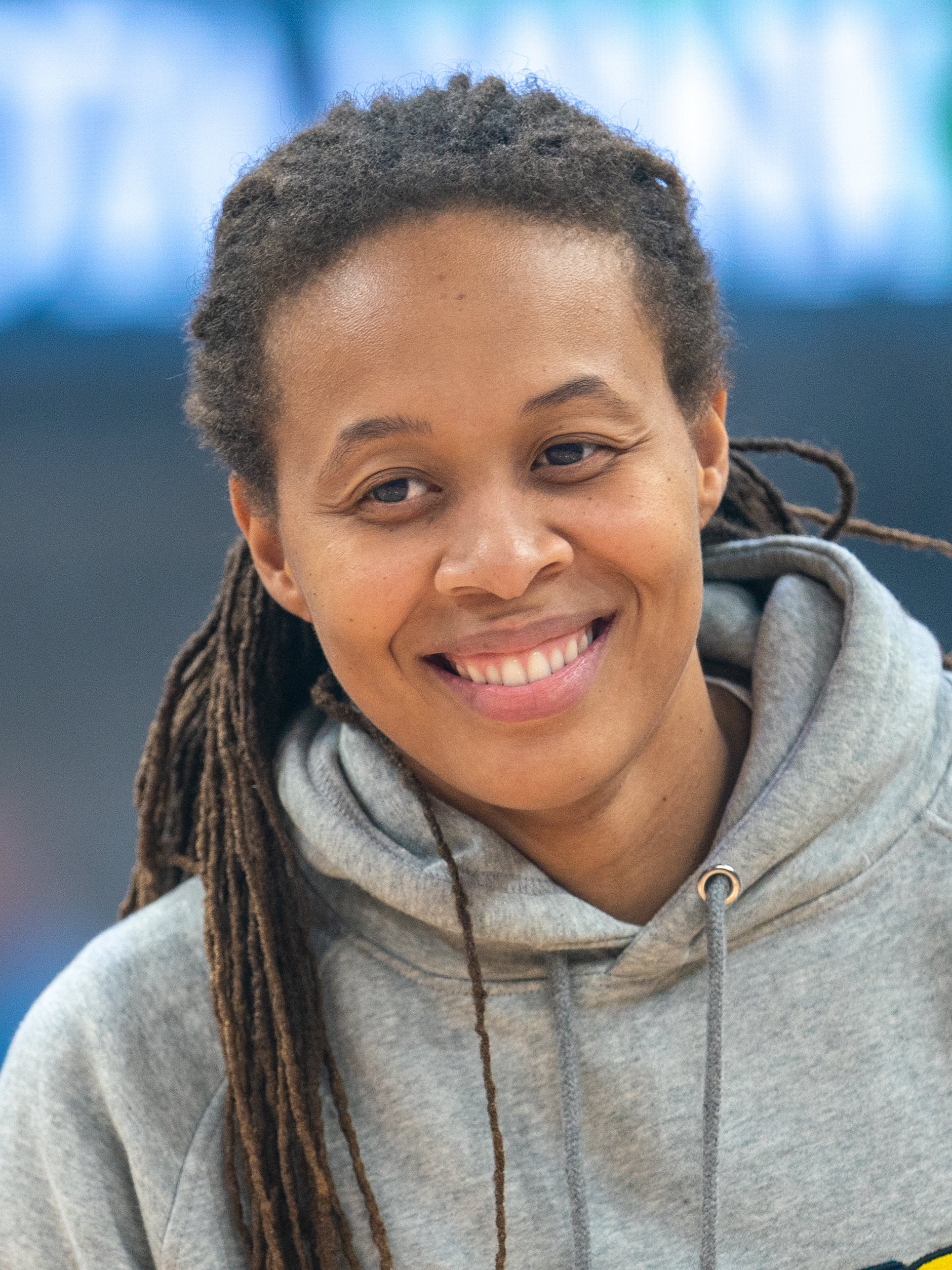

LSU Tigers
- Title: Assistant coach
- League: Southeastern Conference

Personal information
- Born: April 30, 1984 (age 42) Baton Rouge, Louisiana, U.S.
- Listed height: 6 ft 0 in (1.83 m)
- Listed weight: 172 lb (78 kg)

Career information
- High school: Capitol (Baton Rouge, Louisiana)
- College: LSU (2002–2006)
- WNBA draft: 2006: 1st round, 1st overall pick
- Drafted by: Minnesota Lynx
- Playing career: 2006–2020
- Position: Small forward
- Coaching career: 2021–present

Career history

Playing
- 2006–2019: Minnesota Lynx
- 2006–2008: Dynamo Moscow
- 2008–2009, 2010–2011: Galatasaray
- 2011–2012: WBC Spartak Moscow Region
- 2013–2016: Dynamo Kursk
- 2020: Los Angeles Sparks

Coaching
- 2021–2022: Los Angeles Sparks (assistant)
- 2024–present: LSU (assistant)

Career highlights
- 4× WNBA champion (2011, 2013, 2015, 2017); WNBA Finals MVP (2011); 8× WNBA All-Star (2006, 2007, 2011, 2013–2015, 2017, 2018); All-WNBA First Team (2012); 5× All-WNBA Second Team (2006, 2007, 2011, 2013, 2014); WNBA Rookie of the Year (2006); WNBA All-Rookie Team (2006); WNBA anniversary teams (20th, 25th); WNBA Skills Challenge Champion (2006); No. 33 retired by Minnesota Lynx; 2× EuroCup winner (2008, 2009); EuroCup MVP (2009); Turkish Cup winner (2009); Senior CLASS Award (2006); 2× Wade Trophy (2005, 2006); 2× Naismith College Player of the Year (2005, 2006); 2× Wooden Award (2005, 2006); 2× Honda Sports Award for basketball (2005, 2006); 2× SEC Player of the Year (2005, 2006); 2× AP Player of the Year (2005, 2006); USBWA National Player of the Year (2005); 2× All-American – USBWA (2005, 2006); 2× First-team All-American – AP (2005, 2006); 2× Third-team All-American – AP (2003, 2004); 3× Kodak All-American (2004–2006); SEC Female Athlete of the Year (2006); 3× First-team All-SEC (2004–2006); USA Basketball Female Athlete of the Year (2003); USBWA National Freshman of the Year (2003); SEC Freshman of the Year (2003); SEC All-Freshman Team (2003); NCAA season scoring leader (2006); No. 33 retired by LSU Lady Tigers; McDonald's All-American (2002)
- Stats at WNBA.com
- Stats at Basketball Reference
- Basketball Hall of Fame
- Women's Basketball Hall of Fame
Medals
Women's basketball
Representing United States
Olympic Games
Gold medal – first place	2008 Beijing	Team
Gold medal – first place	2012 London	Team
Gold medal – first place	2016 Rio de Janeiro	Team
World Championship
Gold medal – first place	2014 Turkey
Bronze medal – third place	2006 Brazil
World University Games
Gold medal – first place	2005 Izmir	Team

Seimone Delicia Augustus (born April 30, 1984) is an American basketball coach and former professional player. She is currently an assistant coach for the Louisiana State University women's basketball team. She was drafted first overall by the Minnesota Lynx in the 2006 WNBA draft and played for the Lynx for most of her Women's National Basketball Association (WNBA) career except for her final season in with the Los Angeles Sparks. An eight-time All-Star and the 2011 finals MVP, Augustus led the Lynx to four WNBA championships. She also won three gold medals in the Olympics on the U.S. national team.

In addition to the WNBA and the national team, she played for overseas for different teams, ending with the Dynamo Kursk. After retiring as a player in 2020, she was an assistant coach for the Sparks for two seasons.

== Early life ==
Augustus was born in Baton Rouge, Louisiana; she is the daughter of Seymore and Kim Augustus.

Before her freshman year in high school, Augustus was featured on the cover of Sports Illustrated for Women, with a headline that asked, "Is She the Next Michael Jordan?" Augustus played for Capitol High School in Baton Rouge, Louisiana, where she was named a WBCA All-American. She participated in the 2002 WBCA High School All-America Game where she scored fourteen points, and earned MVP honors.

== College career ==
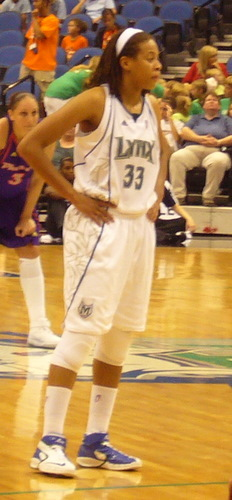
Augustus in 2007

During her collegiate career with the LSU Lady Tigers, the two-time All-American won the Naismith College Player of the Year, Wooden Award and Wade Trophy in 2005 and 2006 while leading the LSU to three straight Final Four appearances. The Lady Tigers however, never advanced beyond the semi-final round. She averaged 19.3 points, 5.2 rebounds and 2 assists per game in her collegiate career. During her final year, she won the Lowe's Senior CLASS Award, recognizing her as the nation's top senior women's basketball player. Augustus graduated from Louisiana State University in 2006. Her uniform number (33) was retired by LSU on January 9, 2010, making her the first female athlete in school history to receive that honor. In January 2023, she became the first female athlete in school history to have a statue of her on the school campus; that statue is in front of the school’s basketball training center next to statues of Bob Pettit, Shaquille O'Neal, and Pete Maravich, who also played for LSU.

Augustus also played with future WNBA teammate Sylvia Fowles during her collegiate career at LSU.

== WNBA career ==
=== 2006–2008: Personal success, team failure ===
Augustus was drafted No. 1 overall in 2006 WNBA draft by the Minnesota Lynx. Selected as a reserve for the 2006 WNBA All Star Game at Madison Square Garden, Augustus led the West squad with 16 points and won the Skills Competition the previous evening.

Augustus finished 2006 second to the Mercury's Diana Taurasi in scoring at 21.9 points per game, a rookie record. Only one player (Taurasi 2006), scored more points in a single season. In addition, she finished sixth in free throw percentage (.897). On August 20, Augustus was named the 2006 WNBA Rookie of the Year.

The former LSU star improved to a career-high 22.6 points per game in 2007, while shooting nearly 51% from the field. An All Star for the second straight year, Augustus finished second to Seattle's Lauren Jackson in scoring average and played in all 34 games. The Lynx however, finished 10–24 tied with Los Angeles Sparks for the league's worst record.

=== 2009–2010: Injuries ===
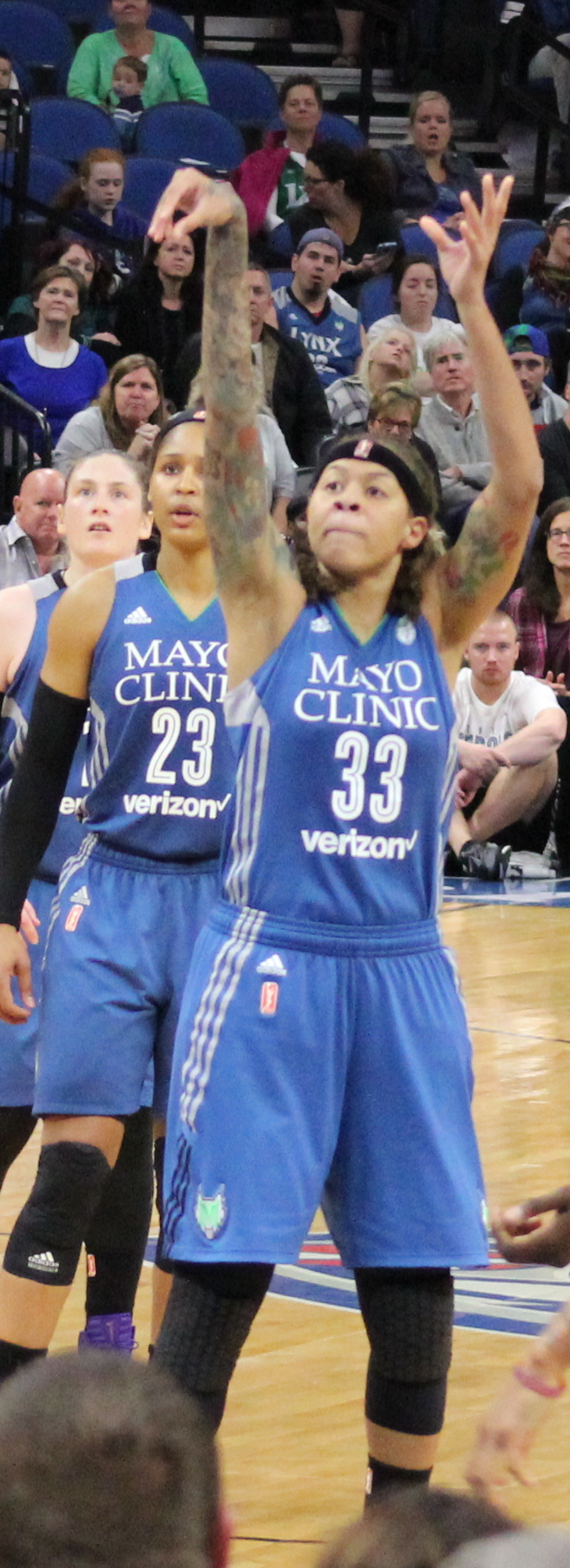
Augustus shoots a free-throw in the 2016 WNBA Finals. At left are Lindsay Whalen and Maya Moore.

In June 2009, Seimone suffered a season-ending injury, a torn ACL, against the Phoenix Mercury.

Augustus's return in 2010 was derailed by medical issues as well, as she was forced to undergo surgery to remove fibroid tumors, including one the size of a golf ball. Augustus had attempted to postpone surgery until after the season, but the pain was too difficult to play through. Despite the setback, Augustus returned to play the final 25 games of the season.

=== 2011–2018: Dynasty ===
Augustus was finally back to full strength in 2011, and a part of a potent Lynx team that included a supporting cast of Lindsay Whalen, Rebekkah Brunson and newly acquired rookie Maya Moore. Augustus led the team in scoring and served as the team's lead defender as the Lynx rolled to a league best 27–7 record. Augustus also made her first all-star game since 2007. She finished eighth in MVP voting, and was named Second Team All-WNBA for the third time in her career, and the first since 2007.

Augustus elevated her game in the playoffs. She led the Lynx in scoring in five of their eight games, and scored the second-highest number of points in WNBA Finals history – 36 – in game two of the 2011 WNBA Finals. The Lynx swept the Atlanta Dream in the title round, with Augustus being unanimously named Finals MVP.

The Lynx were not a flash in the pan; they would return to the finals the next two seasons, losing to the Indiana Fever in 2012, and defeating Atlanta again in 2013. Augustus continued to earn accolades during this time. She was named first-team all-WNBA in 2012, and voted an all-star-game starter in 2013.

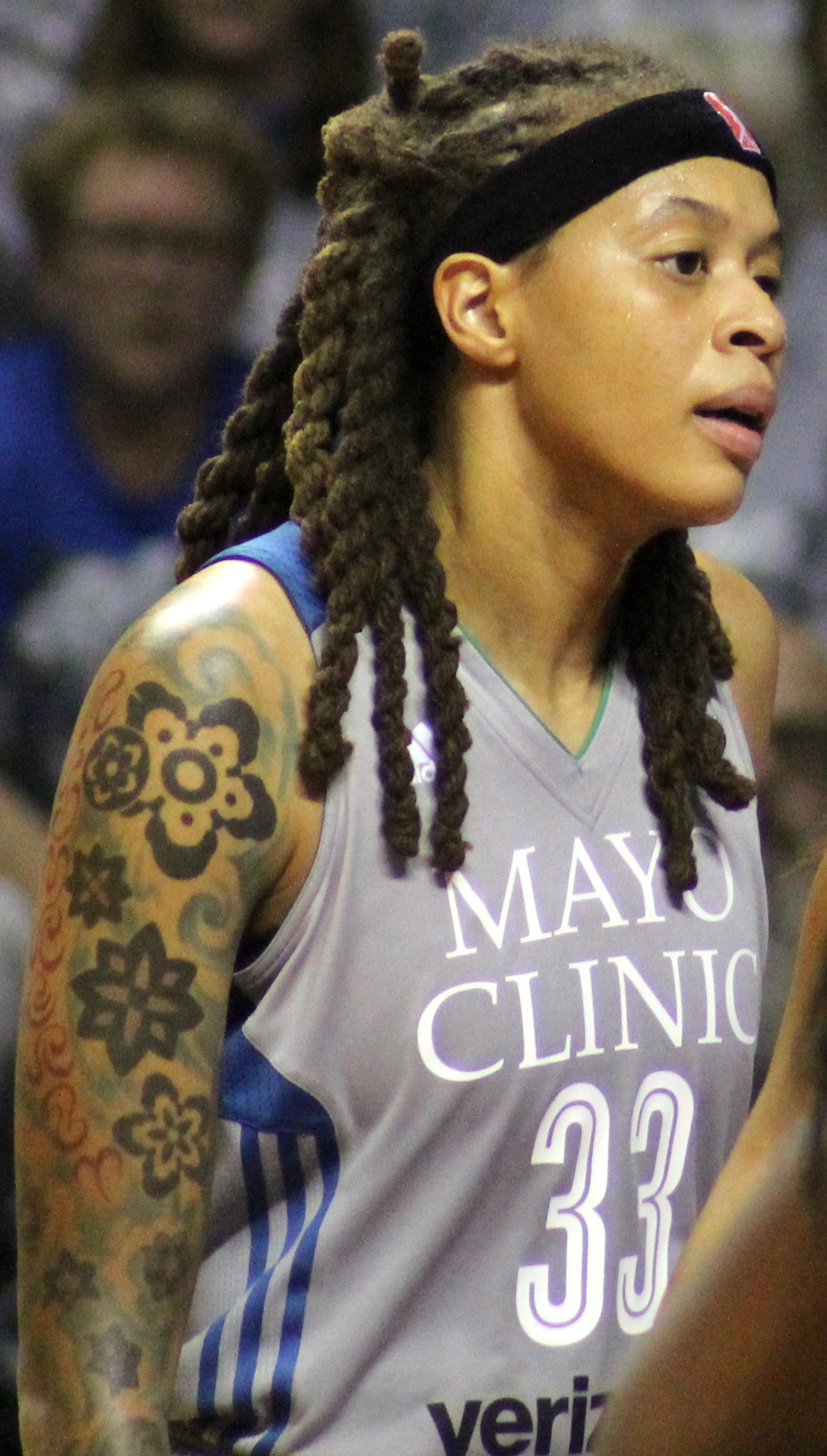
Augustus during the 2017 WNBA Finals

During the 2015 season, Augustus was named a WNBA All-Star for the sixth time in her career while averaging 13.8 points per game. However, Augustus was battling a right knee injury and was out indefinitely midway through the season to have knee surgery. The Lynx had remained dominant; making a trade for star center Sylvia Fowles, strengthening their starting lineup as they finished first place in the Western Conference with a 22–12 record. Augustus returned in time for the playoffs and The Lynx returned to the finals for a rematch against the Indiana Fever, this time with the Lynx beating Indiana in a hard-fought series, 3–2, with the newly acquired Sylvia Fowles winning Finals MVP, as the Lynx won their third WNBA championship in five years.

In the 2016 season, the Lynx continued to be a championship contender in the league, as they finished with a franchise best 28–6 record. With the WNBA's new playoff format in effect, the Lynx were the number 1 seed in the league with a double-bye to the semi-finals (the last round before the WNBA Finals) facing the Phoenix Mercury. Prior to the playoffs, Augustus had signed a multi-year contract extension with the Lynx. The Lynx defeated the Mercury in a three-game sweep, advancing to the WNBA Finals for the fifth time in six years. The Lynx were up against the Los Angeles Sparks, making it the second time in league history where two teams from the same conference faced each other in the Finals due to the new playoff format. However, the Lynx were defeated by the Sparks in five games. Also in 2016, Augustus was chosen to the WNBA Top 20@20, a list of the league's best 20 players ever in celebration of the WNBA's twentieth anniversary.

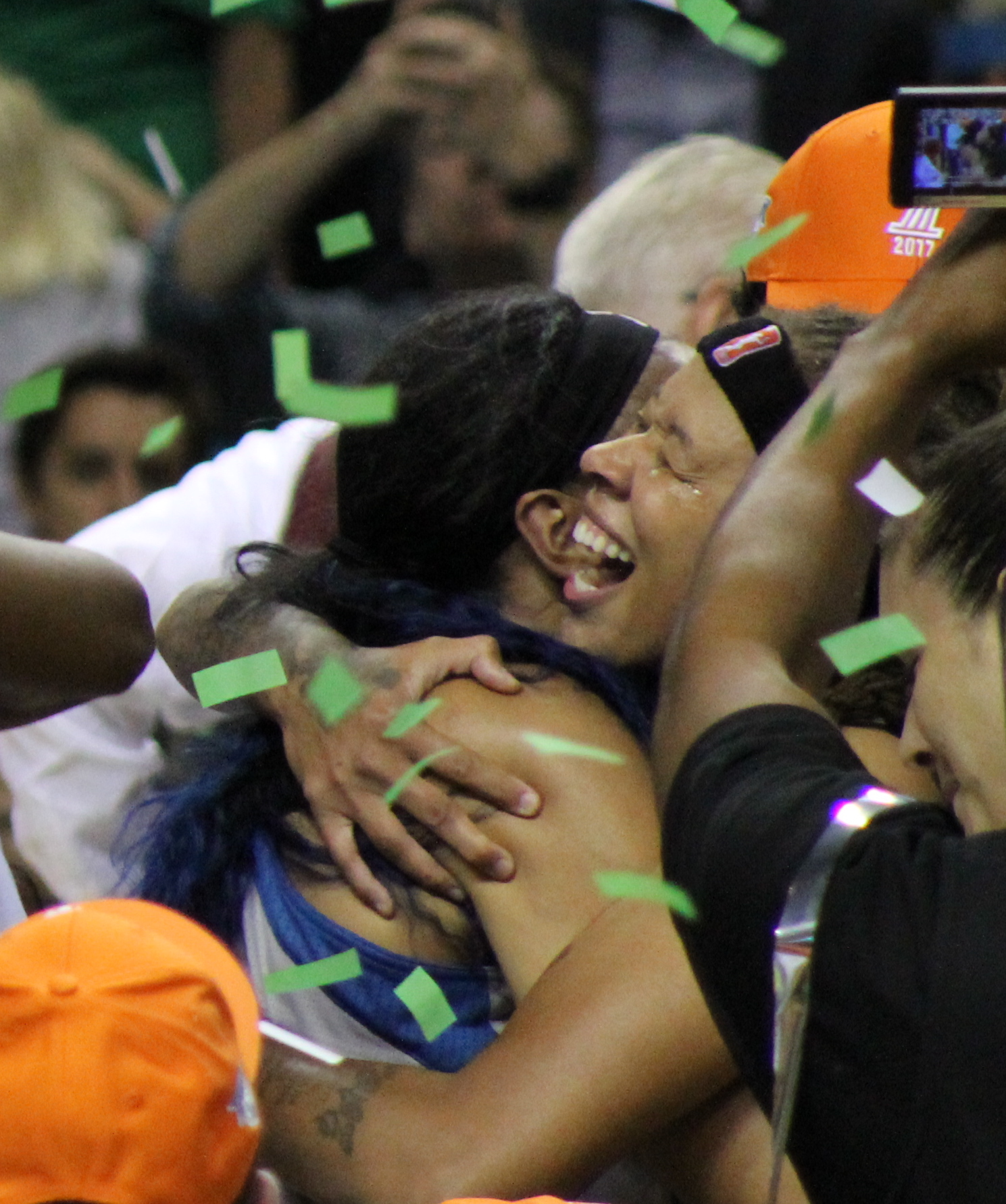
Augustus celebrates after the Lynx win their fourth championship in 2017

In the 2017 season, Augustus seemed to decline in scoring. She was still voted into the 2017 WNBA All-Star Game, making it her seventh all-star game appearance of her career, despite being less of a scorer she was more of a facilitator on offense, averaging a career-high in assists. On August 12, 2017, the Lynx made history as they defeated the Indiana Fever, 111–52, marking it the largest margin of victory in WNBA history; they also went on a league record 37–0 scoring run during the game. The Lynx finished with the number 1 seed yet again, with a 27–7 record, receiving a double-bye to the semi-finals. In the playoffs, Augustus stepped up on offence and scored more to be more effective for her team. In the semi-finals, the Lynx defeated the Washington Mystics in a three-game sweep, advancing to the WNBA Finals for the sixth time in seven years, setting up a rematch with the Sparks. Augustus scored a season-high 24 points in game 1 against Washington. The Lynx avenged last year's Finals loss, this time by defeating the Sparks in five games to win their fourth championship in seven seasons, tying the now-defunct Houston Comets for most championships wins.

=== 2018–2020: End of an era, departure from the Lynx ===
In the 2018 season, the Lynx would start showing signs of age as their days of yearly championship contention started coming to an end. They failed to get off to a hot start to the season as they were 4–6 in their first 10 games. Despite averaging a career-low in scoring, Augustus would still be voted into the 2018 WNBA All-Star Game for her eighth all-star game appearance. By the end of the season, the Lynx finished as the number 7 seed with an 18–16 record, making it the first time in 8 years that they did not finish as a top 2 seed. In the first round elimination game, the Lynx lost 75–68 to the rival Los Angeles Sparks, ending their streak of three straight finals appearances. Despite the retirement of her longtime teammate Lindsay Whalen, Augustus re-signed with the Lynx.

In 2019, Augustus would only play in 12 games due to a nagging knee injury, she had missed the first half of the season to recover and made her return in August. The Lynx finished 18–16 with the number 7 seed but were eliminated by the Seattle Storm in the first round elimination game.

In 2020, Augustus left the Lynx after 14 seasons and signed a one-year deal with the Los Angeles Sparks. Her mother had planned events for 2020 to thank Minnesota for taking care of her daughter for so long but both mother and daughter wound up in tears. Augustus explained that she was saddened and disappointed with the tone of negotiations with the Lynx — who were all business, and who had offered her more money than L.A. Augustus would take a bench role with the Sparks. On July 25, 2020, she would make her Sparks debut, scoring 14 points in the team's 99–76 win against the Phoenix Mercury. On August 9, 2020, she scored 13 points in the team's 97–81 win against her former team. The Sparks finished 15–7 with the number 3 seed, receiving a bye to the second round. The season had been delayed and shortened to 22 games in a bubble at IMG Academy due to the COVID-19 pandemic. In the playoffs, the Sparks would come up short as they lost 73–59 to the Connecticut Sun in the second round elimination game.

In 2021, Augustus re-signed with the Sparks on a one-year deal. On May 13, 2021, she announced her retirement from play, and joined the Los Angeles Sparks coaching staff. Later that year, as part of the league's celebration of its 25th season, Augustus was named to The W25, consisting of the top 25 WNBA players of all time as chosen by a panel of media and women's basketball pioneers.

On May 29, 2022, the Minnesota Lynx retired her jersey in Target Center.

== Career statistics ==
=== WNBA ===
Legend
GP	Games played	GS	Games started	MPG	Minutes per game	RPG	Rebounds per game
APG	Assists per game	SPG	Steals per game	BPG	Blocks per game	PPG	Points per game
TO	Turnovers per game	FG%	Field-goal percentage	3P%	3-point field-goal percentage	FT%	Free-throw percentage
**Bold**	Career best	°	League leader

†	Denotes seasons in which Augustus won a WNBA championship

==== Regular season ====
Year	Team	GP	GS	MPG	FG%	3P%	FT%	RPG	APG	SPG	BPG	TO	PPG
2006	Minnesota	**34**	**34**	33.1	.456	.353	.897	3.8	1.5	0.6	0.5	2.0	21.9
2007	Minnesota	**34**	33	32.1	.508	.419	.873	4.0	2.3	1.2	**0.6**	2.4	**22.6**
2008	Minnesota	31	31	**33.6**	.470	.317	.890	3.9	2.7	1.0	0.4	1.6	19.1
2009	Minnesota	6	6	29.7	**.570**	**.643**	.905	**4.2**	1.5	**2.0**	0.5	2.1	21.0
2010	Minnesota	25	25	33.3	.429	.336	.667	3.2	1.9	0.7	0.3	1.4	16.4
2011^{†}	Minnesota	**34**	**34**	29.3	.504	.417	.865	3.5	2.2	0.9	0.4	1.3	16.2
2012	Minnesota	29	29	29.3	.491	.437	.852	3.6	2.5	0.9	0.2	1.7	16.6
2013^{†}	Minnesota	31	31	29.8	.516	.290	.879	3.2	2.5	0.5	0.5	1.4	16.3
2014	Minnesota	24	24	31.2	.511	.333	.846	3.6	2.4	0.4	0.1	1.6	16.5
2015^{†}	Minnesota	16	16	30.1	.440	.130	**1.000**	2.9	2.4	0.5	0.3	**1.2**	13.8
2016	Minnesota	29	29	26.4	.460	.333	.804	2.9	2.4	0.5	0.3	1.9	11.2
2017^{†}	Minnesota	32	32	27.7	.502	.432	.868	2.9	**4.0**	0.5	0.0	1.4	10.9
2018	Minnesota	33	33	26.2	.467	.318	.706	1.8	2.6	0.4	0.2	1.2	10.8
2019	Minnesota	12	7	13.0	.313	.167	.750	0.6	1.3	0.4	0.1	1.0	3.8
2020	Los Angeles	21	0	15.8	.491	.545	.667	1.8	1.2	0.6	0.1	0.4	5.9
Career	15 years, 2 teams	391	365	28.8	.480	.364	.858	3.1	2.3	0.7	0.3	1.6	15.4

==== Postseason ====
Year	Team	GP	GS	MPG	FG%	3P%	FT%	RPG	APG	SPG	BPG	TO	PPG
2011^{†}	Minnesota	8	8	33.0	.527	.438	**.886**	4.5	**3.8**	0.9	0.6	1.6	**22.0**
2012	Minnesota	9	9	**35.0**	.427	.294	.806	**5.0**	2.1	**1.6**	0.3	1.5	17.9
2013^{†}	Minnesota	7	7	32.0	**.546**	.333	.684	3.7	1.4	1.0	**0.9**	1.7	17.4
2014	Minnesota	5	5	34.2	.443	.250	.833	3.2	2.4	1.0	0.2	**1.0**	18.6
2015^{†}	Minnesota	**10**	**10**	34.4	.379	.143	.762	3.0	2.5	0.9	0.3	1.3	12.8
2016	Minnesota	8	8	26.9	.393	.250	.870	2.9	3.3	0.8	0.2	2.0	11.1
2017^{†}	Minnesota	8	8	31.8	.490	**.526**	.500	4.8	3.5	0.3	0.5	1.6	13.9
2018	Minnesota	1	1	24.0	.286	.000	.500	3.0	2.0	0.0	0.0	**1.0**	5.0
2019	Minnesota	1	0	21.0	.273	.000	.000	3.0	0.0	1.0	**1.0**	**1.0**	6.0
2020	Los Angeles	1	0	22.0	.500	.000	**1.000**	3.0	1.0	0.0	**1.0**	**1.0**	10.0
Career	10 years, 2 teams	58	56	32.0	.452	.322	.799	3.8	2.6	0.9	0.5	1.5	15.5

=== College ===
Legend
GP	Games played	GS	Games started	MPG	Minutes per game	FG%	Field goal percentage	3P%	3-point field goal percentage
FT%	Free throw percentage	RPG	Rebounds per game	APG	Assists per game	SPG	Steals per game	BPG	Blocks per game
TO	Turnovers per game	PPG	Points per game	**Bold**	Career high	*	Led Division I

Year	Team	GP	Points	FG%	3P%	FT%	RPG	APG	SPG	BPG	PPG
2002–03	LSU	34	504	54.9	33.3	88.8	5.5	1.9	1.0	0.4	14.8
2003–04	LSU	35	679	52.8	37.5	**90.1**	**6.0**	**2.1**	**1.6**	**0.7**	19.4
2004–05	LSU	**36**	724	**53.9**	27.8	86.9	4.6	**2.1**	1.4	0.5	20.1
2005–06	LSU	35	**795**	56.1	**45.0**	79.0	4.7	1.8	1.5	0.4	***22.7**
Career	LSU	140	2702	54.4	38.8	85.7	5.2	2.0	1.4	0.5	19.3

== Overseas career ==
In the 2006–07 and 2007–08 WNBA off seasons, she played for the Dynamo Moscow club in Russia.

During the 2008–09 WNBA offseason, Augustus played in the EuroCup for Galatasaray, a club based in Turkey. She would once again play for Galatasaray in the 2010-11 WNBA offseason.

Since 2013, Augustus played three consecutive offseasons for Dynamo Kursk of the Russian League.

=== Awards and achievements ===
- 2004—Winner of the Honda Sports Award for basketball
- 2005—Winner of the Honda Sports Award for basketball
- 2007–08 Turkish Presidents Cup Winner with Galatasaray
- 2008–09 FIBA Eurocup Winner with Galatasaray
- 2008–09 FIBA Eurocup MVP with Galatasaray

== USA Basketball career ==
Augustus was a member of the U.S. women's basketball team, and she earned a gold medal at the 2008, 2012 and 2016 Summer Olympics.

Augustus was invited to the USA Basketball Women's National Team training camp in the fall of 2009. The team selected to play for the 2010 FIBA World Championship and the 2012 Olympics is usually chosen from these participants. At the conclusion of the training camp, the team traveled to Ekaterinburg, Russia, where they competed in the 2009 UMMC Ekaterinburg International Invitational. While Augustus did not go to the World Championship, she was chosen for her second Olympic tournament. Augustus was ultimately selected to the 2014 FIBA World Championship, along with Lynx teammates Moore and Whalen, and the US went on to win the gold medal.

== Post-retirement basketball honors and awards ==
=== 2021 ===
- Named to the W25 - top 25 WNBA players of all time

=== 2022 ===
- Minnesota Lynx retired her jersey on May 29, 2022

=== 2023 ===
- All-25 Team, Minnesota Lynx
- First female athlete in Louisiana State University history to have a statue on campus

=== 2024 ===
- Inducted in the Women's Basketball Hall of Fame on April 27, 2024
- Inducted into the Naismith Basketball Hall of Fame Class of 2024
- Inducted into the Louisiana Sports Hall of Fame in June 2024
- Inducted into the East Baton Rouge Parish Hall of Fame in March 2024

== Coaching career ==
Augustus was an assistant coach for the Sparks in 2021 and 2022. In 2023, Augustus was taking a break from coaching but expressed interest in returning to it at some level in the future. She served as a facilitator for the 2023 season of Athletes Unlimited Basketball. On May 20, 2024, Louisiana State University announced that Augustus returned to her alma mater as an assistant coach for women's basketball under coach Kim Mulkey. LSU assistant coach Bob Starkey encouraged Augustus to consider coaching and would send her books about leadership and coaching when she was playing in the WNBA. Kim Mulkey tried to recruit Augustus as an assistant coach when she moved to LSU in 2021, but Augustus didn't feel the time was right.

== Other basketball professional activities ==
In March 2023, the book Hoop Muses was published by the Hachette Book Group. Augustus is credited as the curator of the book, along with writing by Kate Fagan and illustrations from Sophia Chang. The book is a "colorful encyclopedia of sorts" on women's basketball.

== Personal life ==
In April 2010, Augustus had surgery at Fairview Southdale Hospital to remove fibroids, a surgery that both her mother and grandmother had undergone. While her uterus was removed during the operation, her ovaries were left intact, making children via a gestational surrogate possible. She has said that she wants children someday.

Augustus is openly lesbian. She became engaged to LaTaya Varner in 2010, and married her in Hawaii in 2015. As of October 2018, they are divorced. In 2012, Augustus was the grand marshall of the Twin Cities Pride Parade along with Varner. The New York Times called Augustus "one of sports’ most forward-thinking and undersung activists." She came out publicly in 2012 in the magazine The Advocate and spoke out about her own story as advocacy against a proposed state constitutional amendment that would have banned same-sex marriages in Minnesota.

Augustus is the cousin of former Mississippi State power forward, Kodi Augustus.
