= Lindsay Whalen =

American basketball player and coach (born 1982)

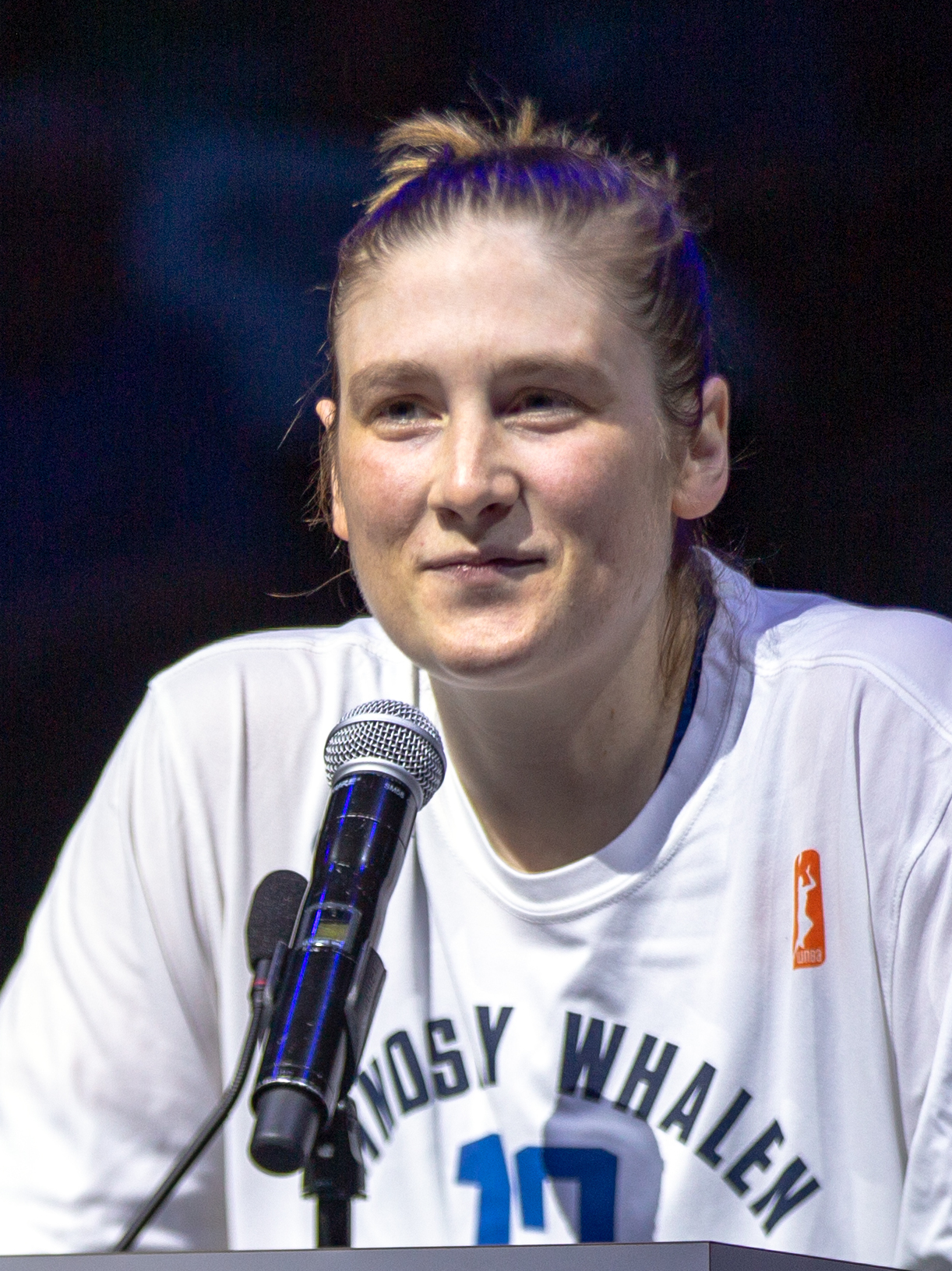
- Whalen in 2018

Minnesota Lynx
- Title: Assistant coach
- League: WNBA

Personal information
- Born: May 9, 1982 (age 44) Hutchinson, Minnesota, U.S.
- Listed height: 5 ft 9 in (1.75 m)
- Listed weight: 173 lb (78 kg)

Career information
- High school: Hutchinson (Hutchinson, Minnesota)
- College: Minnesota (2000–2004)
- WNBA draft: 2004: 1st round, 4th overall pick
- Drafted by: Connecticut Sun
- Playing career: 2004–2018
- Position: Point guard
- Number: 13
- Coaching career: 2018–present

Career history

Playing
- 2004–2009: Connecticut Sun
- 2006–2007: UMMC Ekaterinburg
- 2007–2012: ZVVZ USK Prague
- 2010–2018: Minnesota Lynx
- 2012–2013: Galatasaray
- 2013–2014: Dynamo Moscow
- 2014–2016: AGÜ Spor
- 2016: Yakın Doğu Üniversitesi

Career highlights
- 4× WNBA champion (2011, 2013, 2015, 2017); 5× WNBA All-Star (2006, 2011, 2013–2015); 3× All-WNBA First Team (2008, 2011, 2013); 2× All-WNBA Second Team (2012, 2014); 3× WNBA Peak Performer (2008, 2011, 2012); 3× WNBA assists leader (2008, 2011, 2012); WNBA anniversary teams (20th, 25th); WNBA playoffs all-time assists leader; No. 13 retired by Minnesota Lynx; No. 13 retired by Connecticut Sun; Turkish Cup winner (2013); EuroCup winner (2014); 2× All-American – Kodak, USBWA (2003, 2004); 2× Second-team All-American – AP (2003, 2004); Third-team All-American – AP (2002); Big Ten Player of the Year (2002); 2× First-team All-Big Ten (2002–2004); Big Ten All-Freshman Team (2001)
- Stats at WNBA.com
- Stats at Basketball Reference
- Basketball Hall of Fame
- Women's Basketball Hall of Fame
Medals
Women's basketball
Representing United States
Olympic Games
Gold medal – first place	2012 London	Team
Gold medal – first place	2016 Rio de Janeiro	Team
World Championship
Gold medal – first place	2010 Czech Republic
Gold medal – first place	2014 Turkey

Lindsay Marie Whalen (born May 9, 1982) is an American professional basketball coach and former player who is an assistant coach for the Minnesota Lynx of the Women's National Basketball Association (WNBA). Whalen played college basketball at the University of Minnesota, and led the team to its only NCAA tournament Final Four appearance in 2004. Selected fourth overall in the 2004 WNBA draft by the Connecticut Sun, Whalen played for 15 seasons in the WNBA with the Sun and the Lynx, and is considered one of the best point guards in WNBA history.

Whalen won two World titles and two Olympic gold medals with the United States women's national basketball team, as well as four WNBA championships with the Minnesota Lynx. She retired from playing professional basketball at the end of the 2018 season as the WNBA's career leader in games won (323). Whalen was voted into the WNBA Top 20@20 as one of the league's top 20 players of all time in 2016, and was voted into The W25 as one of the league's top 25 players of all time in 2021. Whalen was inducted to the Naismith Memorial Basketball Hall of Fame in 2022 and the Women's Basketball Hall of Fame in 2023.

In 2018, during her final season with the Lynx in the WNBA, Whalen became the head coach at the University of Minnesota, a role she held for five seasons. In November 2024, she returned to the Lynx as an assistant coach.

== Early life ==
At Hutchinson High School in Hutchinson, Minnesota, Whalen was a four-time All-Missota Conference pick, and led her team to three consecutive conference basketball championships. She was also a four-time honorable mention All-State selection. She averaged 22.8 points, 5.8 rebounds and 4.3 assists as a junior. The Hutchinson High School gymnasium has since been renamed in Whalen's honor. She was also an All-Conference selection in tennis and track.

Whalen won a state title and placed 13th nationally with her club team, the Minnesota Jaguars.

== College career ==
The University of Minnesota women's basketball program rose to national prominence during Whalen's college career. The average attendance at women's basketball games grew from 1,087 during her freshman season to 9,866 her senior year. She became Minnesota's all-time leading scorer on January 25, 2004, against Michigan State, surpassing 1994 Wade Trophy Winner Carol Ann Shudlick. Whalen finished her career with 2,285 points, fifth best in Big Ten Conference history.

She was a two-time Wade Trophy Finalist (2003, 2004) and a two-time Naismith Award Finalist (2003, 2004). As a senior, Whalen was a Kodak All-American First Team, made the USBWA All-American Second Team, USBWA All-American Second Team and AP All-American Second Team. She was the first Golden Gopher to earn All-American honors in three different seasons and led Minnesota to its first-ever Final Four appearance in 2004, one of three straight NCAA Tournament appearances for Minnesota. The program had been to the tournament just once before her arrival.

In the postseason, Whalen was named NCAA Mideast Region MVP for the 2004 NCAA tournament and was a unanimous selection for All-Big Ten First Team in 2004, 2003 and 2002. She was a three-time Academic All-Big Ten (2004, 2003, 2002), won the 2004 and 2002 Fast Break Club Award. As a junior, she was a Kodak All-American First Team, USBWA All-American First Team and an AP All-American Second Team.

Whalen's jersey number 13 was raised to the rafters, though not officially retired, by the University of Minnesota during a ceremony in January 2005 at Williams Arena.

== WNBA career ==
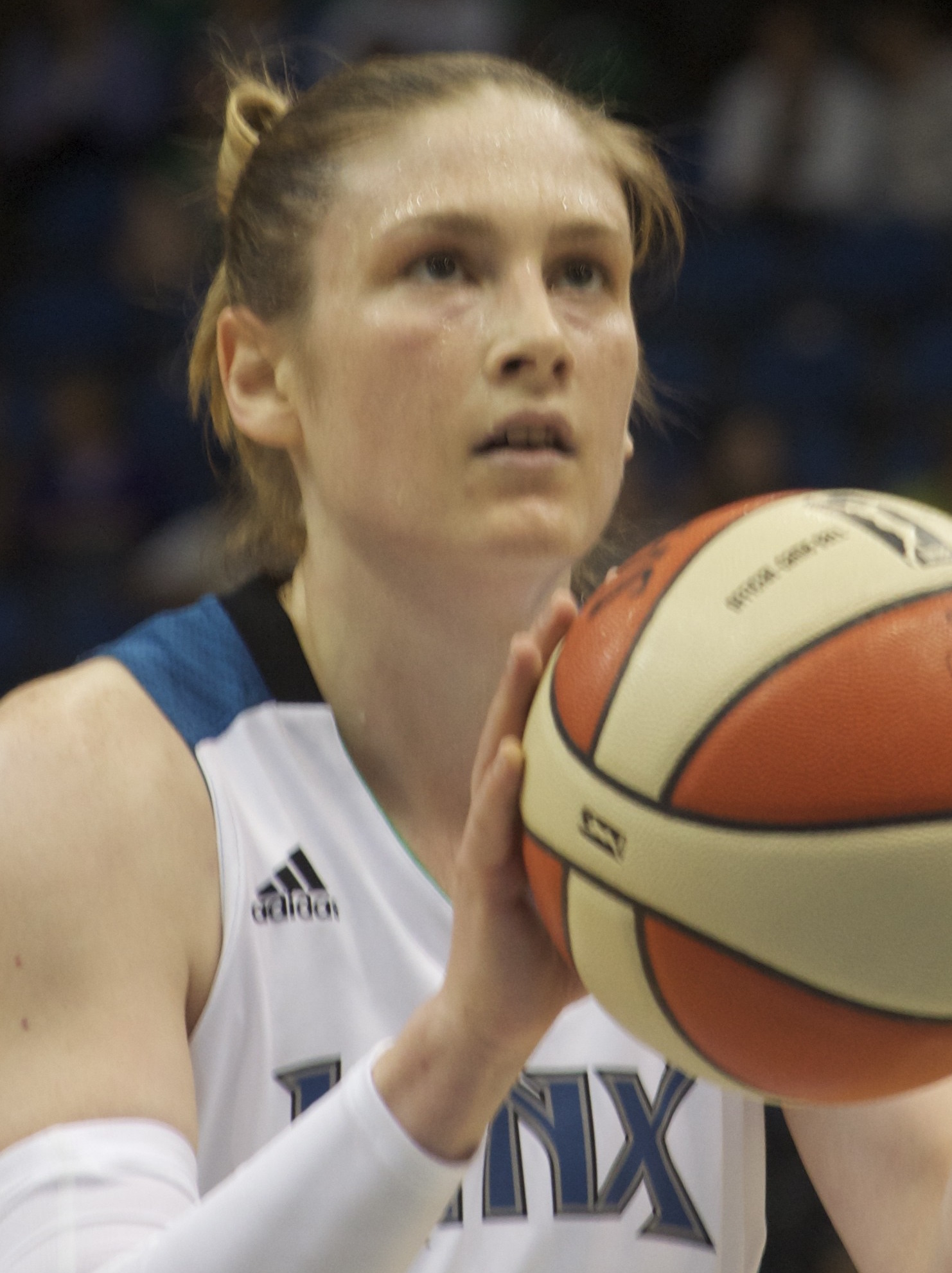
Whalen shoots a free throw in 2013

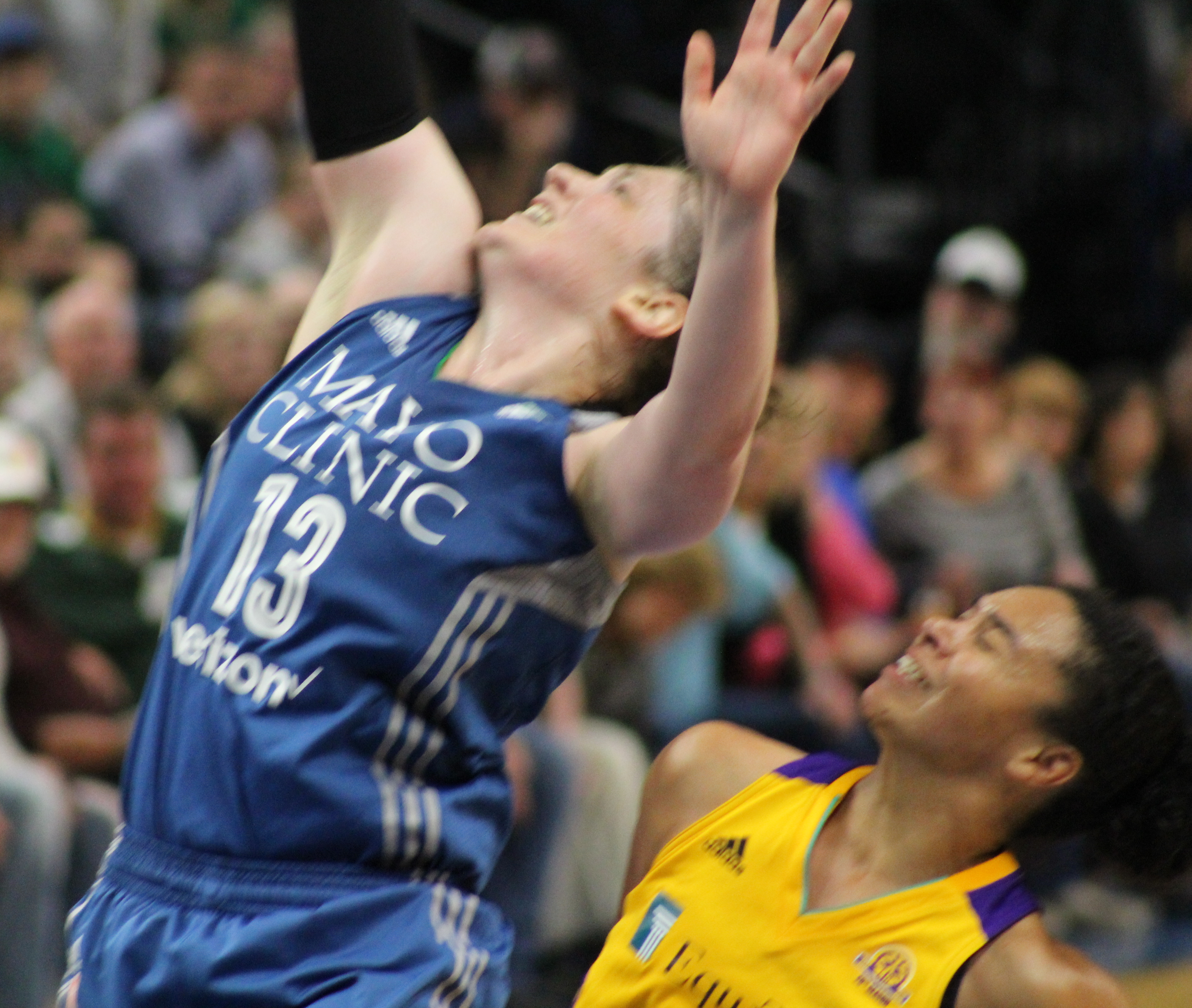
Whalen at the 2016 WNBA Finals. Kristi Toliver of the Los Angeles Sparks at right

Whalen was selected in the first round of the 2004 WNBA draft (4th overall) by the Connecticut Sun. Until 2005 when Minnesota teammate Janel McCarville was selected at number 1, she was the highest drafted WNBA player ever from the Big Ten Conference. The Minnesota Lynx made an unsuccessful pre-draft trade, sending Sheri Sam and Janell Burse to the Seattle Storm for Amanda Lassiter and the 6th pick in the draft in an attempt to get hometown hero Whalen. Connecticut picked Whalen before Minnesota could, and the Storm had two more pieces to their eventual championship team.

In her rookie season, she was selected to play in the historic WNBA vs. USA Basketball game at Radio City Music Hall. She led the Sun to the WNBA Finals in her first and second seasons, playing while injured in the 2005 Finals. The Sun lost both years in the Finals to the Seattle Storm and Sacramento Monarchs respectively.

In the 2008 season, Whalen led a young team to second place in the Eastern Conference. She was the MVP runner-up to Candace Parker. She was selected to the First Team All-WNBA for the first time in her career. In the playoffs, the Sun could not hold off the New York Liberty as they fell 2–1. Whalen led the league in assists with 5.4 per game.

On January 12, 2010, Whalen was traded to her native team, the Minnesota Lynx in a deal that also involved Renee Montgomery. She signed a multi-year contract extension with the Minnesota Lynx prior to the team's August 12, 2010 matchup with the Los Angeles Sparks. Terms of the deal were not announced, per team policy.

In 2011, with a supporting cast of Seimone Augustus, Rebekkah Brunson, Renee Montgomery and rookie Maya Moore, Whalen helped lead the Lynx to its first WNBA Championship. The Lynx finished the regular season 27–7, good for the second best record in franchise history and best in the league. Playing alongside a healthy Seimone Augustus and rookie sensation Maya Moore, Whalen led the WNBA in assists with 5.9 per game. Whalen finished fifth in MVP voting and was named First Team All-WNBA for the second time in her career. In 2012, Whalen led the league in assists for the third time in her career, and led the Lynx back to the finals, where they lost to the Indiana Fever.

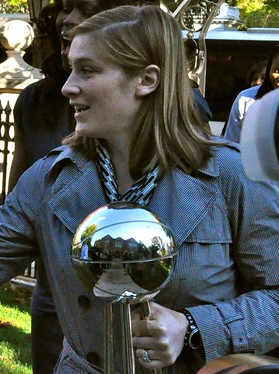
Whalen greeted by the governor of Minnesota in 2011

In 2013, the Minnesota Lynx acquired the rights to Janel McCarville via a three-team trade, and she and Whalen were reunited as teammates. On September 7, 2013, Whalen became only the second player in WNBA history to record 4,000 points, 1,500 assists, and 1,000 rebounds in her career, joining Becky Hammon. She also became the 20th player in league history to reach 4,000 points.

In 2015, Whalen was named a WNBA All-Star for the fifth time in her career while averaging 10.9 ppg and 4.3 apg. Midway through the season the Minnesota Lynx traded for Sylvia Fowles part of a three-team deal, strengthening their lineup as the Lynx made it back to the finals. The finals match-up was a rematch against the Indiana Fever, the Lynx would avenge their previous finals loss defeating the Fever 3–2 in the series, winning their third championship in five years.

During the 2016 season, Whalen's minutes were limited to just under 30 minutes of playing time each game, she averaged 9.8 ppg while shooting a career-high in field goal percentage. The Lynx remained a championship contending team, finishing with a franchise best 28–6 record. With the WNBA's new playoff format in effect, the Lynx were the number 1 seed in the league with a double-bye to the semi-finals (the last round before the WNBA Finals) facing the Phoenix Mercury. Prior to the playoffs, Whalen had signed a multi-year contract extension with the Lynx. The Lynx defeated the Mercury in a 3-game sweep, advancing to the WNBA Finals for the fifth time in six years. It was also Whalen's seventh career Finals appearance, which is the most by any player in league history. The Lynx were up against the Los Angeles Sparks, making it the second time in league history where two teams from the same conference faced each other in the Finals due to the new playoff format. However, the Lynx were defeated by the Sparks in a hard-fought five-game series with a final score of 77–76 in Game 5. The game winning shot came down to Whalen, who with 3 seconds left passed the ball to Rebekkah Brunson off the inbound, immediately passing the ball back to Whalen, who then dribbled up to half court and missed the game winning shot attempt from half court as it hit the top of the backboard and missed the rim. Whalen was also included in the WNBA Top 20@20, the best players in the WNBA's twenty years of activity.

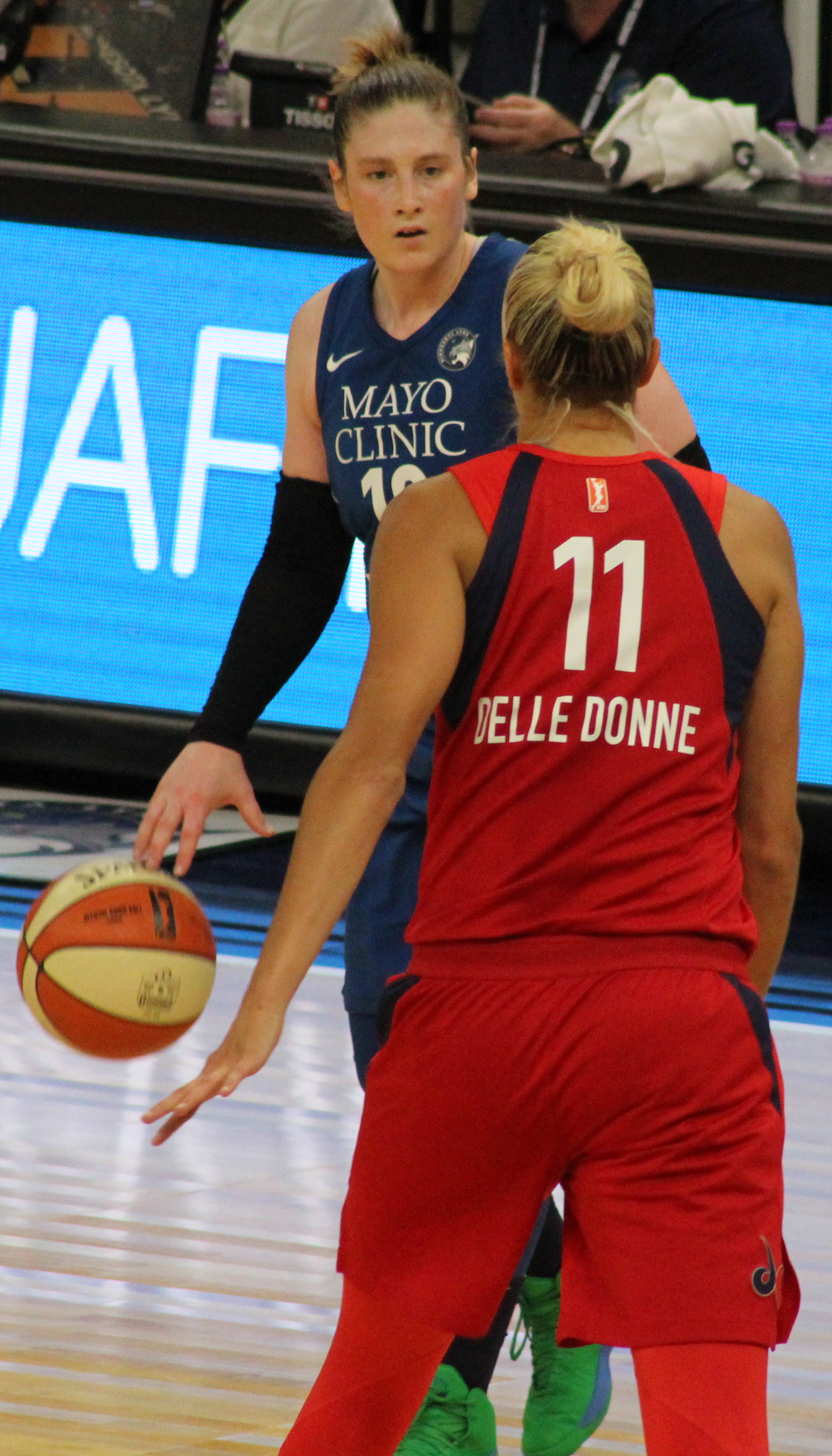
Whalen and Elena Delle Donne in 2018

In the 2017 season, Whalen missed 12 games due to a left hand injury. In August 2017, she underwent successful surgery to repair the fracture in her left hand and was ruled out indefinitely. She played 22 games and averaged 8.0 ppg during the season prior to the injury. Whalen returned in time for the playoffs on September 12, 2017, after recovering from hand surgery. She started in Game 1 of the semi-finals against the Washington Mystics. Whalen scored 2 points along with 2 assists in 17 minutes of play in a 101–81 victory. The Lynx defeated the Washington Mystics in a 3-game sweep, advancing to the WNBA Finals for the sixth time in seven years, setting up a rematch with the Sparks. This would be Whalen's eighth career Finals appearance, adding to her already record-setting number total of Finals appearances in league history. The Lynx would avenge last season's Finals loss defeating the Sparks in five games to win their fourth WNBA championship in seven years, tying the now-defunct Houston Comets for most championship titles.

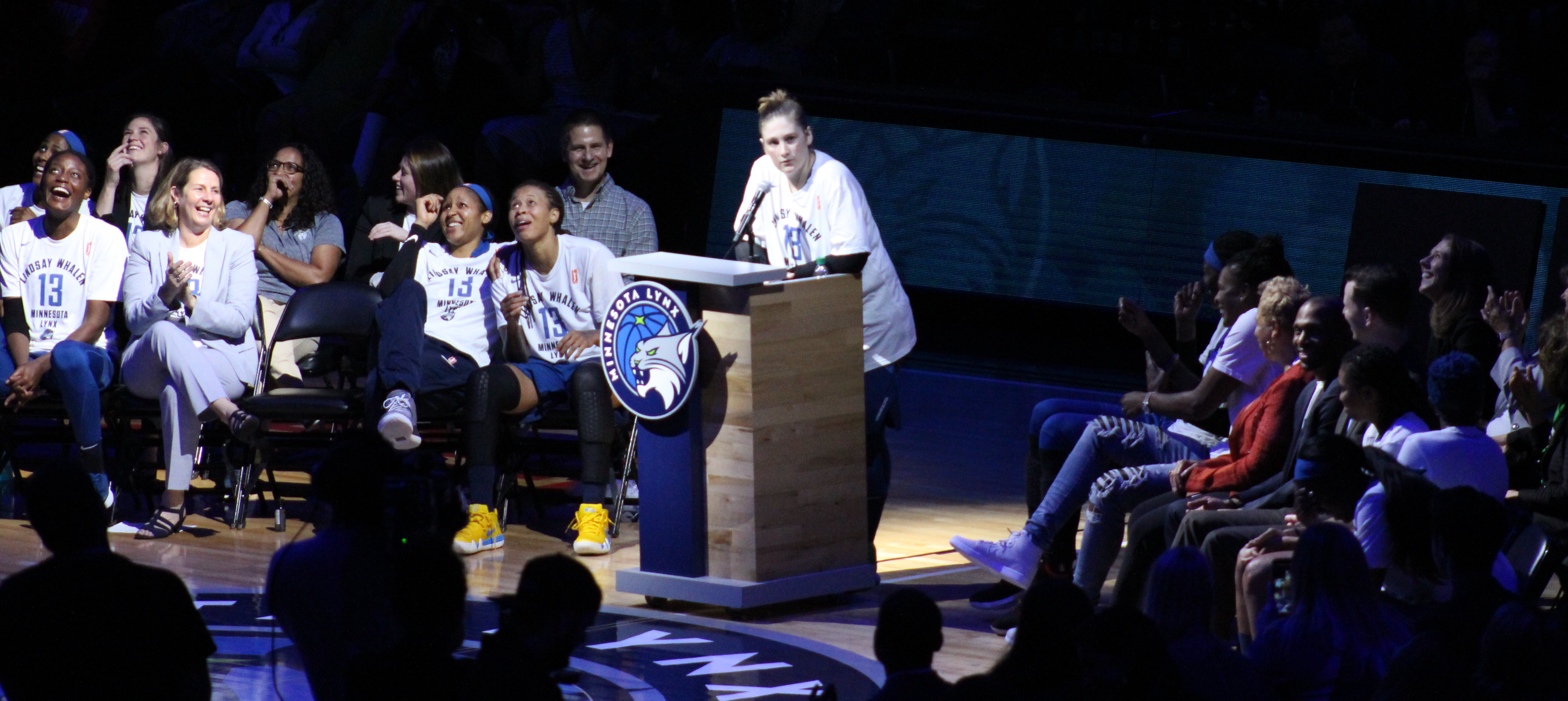
Whalen amusing the audience at Lindsay Whalen Day in 2018

Whalen wanted to retire in March 2018 but stayed on after a four-hour telephone conversation with Lynx head coach Cheryl Reeve. She earned the head coaching job at the university in April, so her dual responsibilities resulted in a season that The New York Times called juggling and "emotional whiplash." In August 2018, she announced she would retire from playing professional basketball after the completion of the 2018 season. The Lynx finished as the number 7 seed in the league with an 18–16 record, making it the first time in 8 years where they didn't finish as a top 2 seed. They faced the rival Los Angeles Sparks in the first round elimination game. This would be Whalen's final game as the Lynx were defeated 75–68; she scored 9 points in the loss.

== Jersey retirement ==
On June 8, 2019, the Minnesota Lynx honored Whalen by retiring her No. 13 jersey that she wore from 2010 to 2018. The ceremony took place at the Target Center before the game against the Los Angeles Sparks. On August 23, 2019, the Connecticut Sun also honored Whalen by retiring her No. 13 jersey that she wore from 2004 to 2009. The ceremony took place at halftime in the Mohegan Sun Arena during the game between the Sun and the Las Vegas Aces.

== USA Basketball ==
Whalen was invited to the USA Basketball Women's National Team training camp in the fall of 2009. The team selected to play for the 2010 FIBA World Championship and the 2012 Olympics is usually chosen from these participants. Whalen was selected to be a member of the National team representing the US at the World Championships held in September and October 2010. The team was coached by Geno Auriemma. Because many team members were still playing in the WNBA until just prior to the event, the team had only one day of practice with the entire team before leaving for Ostrava and Karlovy Vary, Czech Republic. Even with limited practice, the team managed to win its first games against Greece by 26 points. The team continued to dominate with victory margins exceeding 20 points in the first five games. Several players shared scoring honors, with Swin Cash, Angel McCoughtry, Maya Moore, Diana Taurasi, Whalen, and Sylvia Fowles all ending as high scorer in the first few games. The sixth game was against undefeated Australia — the USA jumped out to a 24-point lead and the USA prevailed 83–75. The USA won its next two games by over 30 points, then faced the host team, the Czech Republic, in the championship game. The USA team had only a five-point lead at halftime, which was cut to three points, but the Czechs never got closer. Team USA went on to win the championship and gold medal. Whalen averaged 5.9 points per game.

Whalen was named by the USA Basketball Women's National Team Player Selection Committee to compete for the US at the 2012 Summer Olympics in London. Whalen earned praise for her performance at the Olympics, especially for a critical stretch of play against Australia in the semifinal. Whalen earned her first Olympic gold medal as the U.S. women swept all eight games they played, with an average margin of victory over 34 points per game.

Whalen played for Team USA in the 2016 Summer Olympics and earned her second Olympic gold medal as they defeated Spain 101–72. In 2018, Whalen announced her retirement from USA basketball, citing the facts that she wasn't absolutely sure that she would compete in the 2020 Olympics and the desire to give younger players an opportunity to have an Olympic experience.

== Overseas career ==
In the 2006–07 and 2007-08 off-seasons, Whalen played in Russia for UMMC Ekaterinburg. From 2007 to 2012, Whalen played five off-seasons in Czech Republic for ZVVZ USK Prague. In the 2012-13 off-season, Whalen played in Turkey for Galatasaray and returned to Russia in the 2013-14 off-season to play for Dynamo Moscow with teammate Seimone Augustus. Since 2014, Whalen had played a couple off-seasons for AGÜ Spor in the Turkish League. In January 2016, Whalen was announced as a player for Yakin Dogü Universeti.

== Coaching career ==
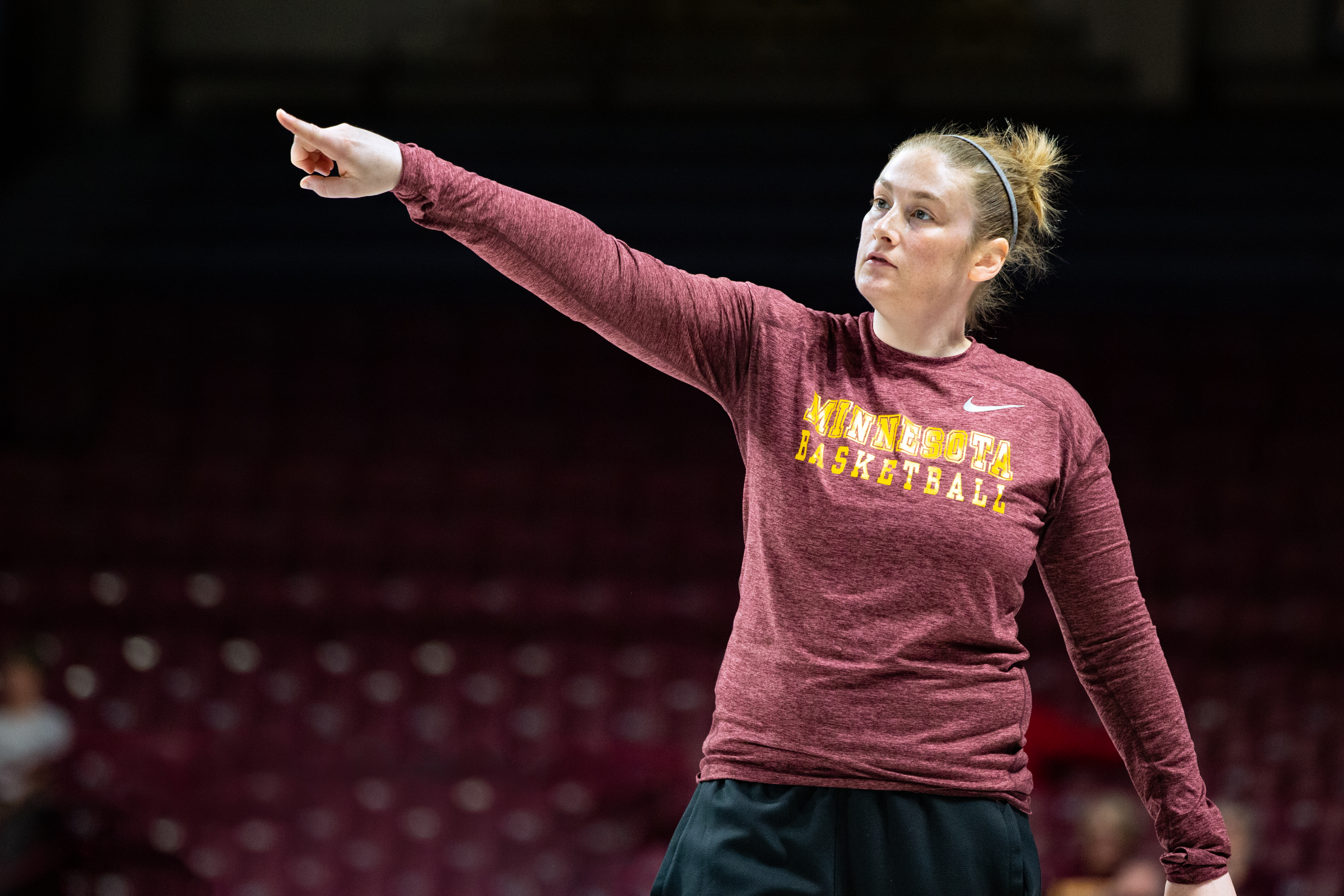
Whalen coaching in 2018

In April 2018, Whalen was hired as the head women's basketball coach at her alma mater, the University of Minnesota. Whalen continued to play for the Lynx until the end of the 2018 season while taking on these duties.

In Whalen's first season she led the team to a 21–11 record, with a 9–9 record in the Big Ten, becoming the fifth coach in Golden Gopher history to win 20+ games in their first season. The Gophers also spent 10 straight weeks in the AP Poll, their longest run since the 2005–06 season. In five seasons at Minnesota, she led the Gophers to a 71–76 overall record and 32–58 record in conference play. On March 2, 2023, Whalen was fired as head coach following Minnesota's first round loss to Penn State during the 2023 Big Ten women's basketball tournament.

On November 30, 2024, Whalen joined her former professional team, the Minnesota Lynx, as an assistant coach.

== Career statistics ==
=== Playing career ===
==== WNBA ====
Legend
GP	Games played	GS	Games started	MPG	Minutes per game	RPG	Rebounds per game
APG	Assists per game	SPG	Steals per game	BPG	Blocks per game	PPG	Points per game
TO	Turnovers per game	FG%	Field-goal percentage	3P%	3-point field-goal percentage	FT%	Free-throw percentage
**Bold**	Career best	°	League leader

†	Denotes seasons in which Whalen won a WNBA championship

As of her retirement, Whalen's regular-season career ranks were as follows (from WNBA.com): 14th in points scored, 3rd in assists, 27th in rebounds, 14th in steals, 9th in field goal percentage, and 12th in free throw percentage. Whalen is also the winningest player in WNBA history, playing on the winning team in 325 WNBA regular season games.

In the playoffs, Whalen ranks 3rd all-time in points scored, 1st in assists, and 14th in rebounds.

Regular season

Year	Team	GP	GS	MPG	FG%	3P%	FT%	RPG	APG	SPG	BPG	TO	PPG
2004	Connecticut	31	30	30.5	.454	.351	.730	2.9	4.8	1.3	0.0	3.0	8.9
2005	Connecticut	**34**	**34**	30.8	.466	.348	.801	3.8	5.1	1.2	0.1	2.6	12.1
2006	Connecticut	33	33	26.0	.389	.129	**.903**	3.7	4.6	1.0	0.1	2.3	9.0
2007	Connecticut	**34**	**34**	30.6	.468	.209	.785	4.8	5.0	**2.1**	0.1	2.1	13.4
2008	Connecticut	31	31	29.3	.461	.338	.803	**5.6**	5.4	1.4	0.0	1.8	14.0
2009	Connecticut	**34**	**34**	29.4	.430	.265	.891	4.6	4.6	1.3	**0.2**	1.8	12.3
2010	Minnesota	33	33	**33.6**	.410	.227	.899	4.0	5.6	1.4	**0.2**	2.3	12.6
2011^{†}	Minnesota	**34**	**34**	28.1	.511	.405	.730	3.5	**5.9**	1.1	**0.2**	2.2	13.6
2012	Minnesota	33	33	27.0	.505	**.500**	.727	4.2	5.4	0.7	**0.2**	2.0	11.5
2013^{†}	Minnesota	**34**	**34**	29.6	.486	.111	.783	4.4	5.8	0.8	0.1	2.1	**14.9**
2014	Minnesota	**34**	**34**	30.6	.480	.100	.770	4.2	5.6	0.9	0.1	1.8	14.1
2015^{†}	Minnesota	29	29	30.1	.462	.429	.882	2.9	4.3	0.4	0.1	2.1	10.9
2016	Minnesota	32	32	24.6	**.513**	.273	.892	2.6	3.8	0.5	0.0	**1.4**	9.8
2017^{†}	Minnesota	22	22	23.6	.451	.353	.750	2.5	4.1	0.5	0.0	2.0	8.0
2018	Minnesota	32	29	19.3	.363	.357	.881	2.6	3.1	0.6	0.0	1.2	5.7
Career	15 years, 2 teams	480	476	28.3	.461	.290	.812	3.8	4.9	1.0	0.0	2.1	11.5

Postseason

Year	Team	GP	GS	MPG	FG%	3P%	FT%	RPG	APG	SPG	BPG	TO	PPG
2004	Connecticut	8	8	31.9	.462	.364	.811	2.2	5.1	1.4	0.4	2.1	13.4
2005	Connecticut	7	7	31.4	.333	.200	.771	3.4	3.3	0.9	0.1	2.8	11.1
2006	Connecticut	5	5	31.0	.339	.333	.720	3.8	2.2	0.8	0.2	3.6	12.6
2007	Connecticut	3	3	**36.7**	.326	.231	**.900**	**7.0**	5.0	0.3	0.0	3.6	13.3
2008	Connecticut	3	3	30.0	.400	.250	.867	4.7	4.0	1.3	0.0	2.3	13.3
2011^{†}	Minnesota	8	8	32.0	.463	.286	.818	3.6	3.8	**1.5**	**0.5**	2.5	12.0
2012	Minnesota	9	9	30.9	.437	.333	.871	3.8	4.2	1.0	0.0	2.6	13.3
2013^{†}	Minnesota	7	7	29.3	.410	.000	.621	4.6	4.7	0.9	0.0	2.4	9.7
2014	Minnesota	5	5	33.0	.525	.429	.696	6.0	**6.0**	0.8	0.0	2.2	**20.6**
2015^{†}	Minnesota	**10**	**10**	23.4	.348	.125	.842	2.1	3.3	0.4	0.0	**1.2**	6.5
2016	Minnesota	8	8	26.6	**.569**	**.429**	.833	1.9	3.9	0.3	0.1	2.0	13.1
2017^{†}	Minnesota	8	8	22.9	.457	.222	.789	2.0	4.9	0.5	0.1	1.7	7.4
2018	Minnesota	1	1	30.4	.333	.200	.000	5.0	5.0	2.0	1.0	2.0	9.0
Career	13 years, 2 teams	82	82	29.2	.430	.280	.789	3.4	4.1	0.9	0.2	2.3	11.6

==== College ====
Legend
GP	Games played	GS	Games started	MPG	Minutes per game
FG%	Field goal percentage	3P%	3-point field goal percentage	FT%	Free throw percentage
RPG	Rebounds per game	APG	Assists per game	SPG	Steals per game
BPG	Blocks per game	PPG	Points per game	**Bold**	Career high

Year	Team	GP	Points	FG%	3P%	FT%	RPG	APG	SPG	BPG	PPG
2000-01	Minnesota	25	425	47.6	30.2	73.5	4.0	3.3	1.7	0.1	17.0
2001-02	Minnesota	30	**667**	**56.1**	34.9	77.0	**5.5**	5.3	**2.7**	**0.2**	**22.2**
2002-03	Minnesota	**31**	639	54.6	32.4	**84.7**	5.0	**6.2**	1.9	0.0	20.6
2003-04	Minnesota	27	554	51.4	**40.0**	83.2	5.1	5.4	1.9	-	20.5
Career	Minnesota	113	2285	52.8	34.9	79.8	4.9	5.1	2.1	0.1	20.2

=== Head coaching record ===
Record table
Season	Team	Overall	Conference	Standing	Postseason
**Minnesota Golden Gophers** (Big Ten Conference) (2018–2023)
2018–19	Minnesota	21–11	9–9	T–6th	WNIT Second Round
2019–20	Minnesota	16–15	5–13	11th	
2020–21	Minnesota	8–13	7–11	10th	
2021–22	Minnesota	15–18	7–11	10th	WNIT Second Round
2022–23	Minnesota	11–19	4–14	T–11th	
Minnesota:		71–76 (.483)	32–58 (.356)		
Total:		71–76 (.483)			
National champion Postseason invitational champion Conference regular season champion Conference regular season and conference tournament champion Division regular season champion Division regular season and conference tournament champion Conference tournament champion

== Personal life ==
Whalen married Ben Greve, an insurance advisor and former Minnesota Golden Gophers golfer, on October 6, 2007.

Awards and achievements
Preceded by Ticha Penicheiro	WNBA Peak Performer (Assists); 2011 season 2012 season	Succeeded by Danielle Robinson
Preceded by Becky Hammon	WNBA Peak Performer (Assists); 2008 season	Succeeded by Sue Bird
