= List of WNBA playoff series =

Listing of WNBA play off series

This is a complete listing of Women's National Basketball Association (WNBA) playoff series, grouped by franchise. Series featuring relocated and renamed teams are kept with their ultimate relocation franchises. Bolded years indicate wins. Years in italics indicate series in progress. Tables are sorted first by the number of series, then the number of wins, and then by year of first occurrence.

== Atlanta Dream ==
Opponent	S	Occurrences	GP	Rec	%
Indiana Fever	4	**2011**, 2012, **2013,** 2025	11	2–2	.500
Washington Mystics	3	**2010**, **2013**, 2018	10	2–1	.667
Dallas Wings	2	2009, 2023	4	0–2	.000
Seattle Storm	2	2010, **2016**	4	1–1	.500
New York Liberty	2	**2010**, 2024	4	1–1	.500
Minnesota Lynx	2	2011, 2013	6	0–2	.000
Chicago Sky	2	2014, 2016	4	0–2	.000
Connecticut Sun	1	**2011**	2	1–0	1.000
Totals	18		45	7–11	.389

== Chicago Sky ==
Opponent	S	Occurrences	GP	Rec	%
Phoenix Mercury	3	2014, **2019**, **2021**	8	2–1	.666
Indiana Fever	3	2013, **2014**, 2015	8	1–2	.333
Connecticut Sun	3	2020, **2021**, 2022	10	1–2	.333
Atlanta Dream	2	**2014**, **2016**	4	2–0	1.000
Las Vegas Aces	2	2019, 2023	2	0–2	.000
Dallas Wings	1	**2021**	1	1–0	1.000
Minnesota Lynx	1	**2021**	1	1–0	1.000
New York Liberty	1	**2022**	3	1–0	1.000
Los Angeles Sparks	1	2016	4	0–1	.000
Totals	17		42	9–8	.529

== Connecticut Sun ==
Opponent	S	Occurrences	GP	Rec	%
Dallas Wings	4	2003, **2005**, 2006, **2022**	10	2–2	.500
New York Liberty	4	**2004**, 2008, **2012**, 2023	11	2–2	.500
Indiana Fever	4	**2005**, 2007, 2012, **2024**	10	2–2	.500
Washington Mystics	3	**2004**, **2006**, 2019	10	2–1	.667
Chicago Sky	3	**2020**, 2021, **2022**	10	2–1	.667
Los Angeles Sparks	2	**2019**, **2020**	4	2–0	1.000
Minnesota Lynx	2	**2023**, 2024	8	1–1	.500
Phoenix Mercury	2	2017, 2018	2	0–2	.000
Las Vegas Aces	2	2020, 2022	9	0–2	.000
Charlotte Sting	1	**2003**	2	1–0	1.000
Cleveland Rockers	1	2000	3	0–1	.000
Seattle Storm	1	2004	3	0–1	.000
Sacramento Monarchs	1	2005	4	0–1	.000
Atlanta Dream	1	2011	2	0–1	.000
Totals	31		88	14–17	.452

== Dallas Wings ==
Opponent	S	Occurrences	GP	Rec	%
Indiana Fever	4	**2006**, **2007**, **2008**, 2009	11	3–1	.750
Connecticut Sun	4	**2003**, 2005, **2006**, 2022	10	2–2	.500
New York Liberty	3	2004, **2007**, **2008**	9	2–1	.667
Phoenix Mercury	3	2007, 2015, 2018	8	0–3	.000
Atlanta Dream	2	**2009**, **2023**	4	2–0	1.000
Las Vegas Aces	2	**2008,** 2023	6	1–1	.500
Cleveland Rockers	1	**2003**	3	1–0	1.000
Los Angeles Sparks	1	**2003**	3	1–0	1.000
Sacramento Monarchs	1	**2006**	5	1–0	1.000
Charlotte Sting	1	1999	1	0–1	.000
Washington Mystics	1	2017	1	0–1	.000
Chicago Sky	1	2021	1	0–1	.000
Totals	24		60	13–11	.542

== Golden State Valkyries ==
Opponent	S	Occurrences	GP	Rec	%
Minnesota Lynx	1	2025	2	0–1	.000
Totals	1		2	0–1	.000

== Indiana Fever ==
Opponent	S	Occurrences	GP	Rec	%
New York Liberty	5	2002, **2005**, 2010, **2011**, **2015**	14	3–2	.600
Connecticut Sun	4	2005, **2007**, **2012**, 2024	10	2–2	.500
Atlanta Dream	4	2011, **2012**, 2013, **2025**	11	2–2	.500
Dallas Wings	4	2006, 2007, 2008, **2009**	11	1–3	.250
Chicago Sky	3	**2013,** 2014, **2015**	8	2–1	.667
Washington Mystics	2	**2009**, **2014**	4	2–0	1.000
Minnesota Lynx	2	**2012**, 2015	9	1–1	.500
Phoenix Mercury	2	2009, 2016	6	0–2	.000
Las Vegas Aces	1	2025	5	0–1	.000
Totals	27		78	13–14	.481

== Las Vegas Aces ==
Opponent	S	Occurrences	GP	Rec	%
Phoenix Mercury	6	2007, 2009, 2010, 2021, **2022, 2025**	18	2–4	.333
Seattle Storm	4	2020, **2022**, **2024**, **2025**	12	3–1	.750
Sacramento Monarchs	3	2001, **2007**, **2008**	8	2–1	.667
Los Angeles Sparks	3	2002, **2008**, 2012	7	1–2	.333
Chicago Sky	2	**2019**, **2023**	3	2–0	1.000
Connecticut Sun	2	**2020**, **2022**	9	2–0	1.000
Dallas Wings	2	2008, **2023**	6	1–1	.500
New York Liberty	2	**2023**, 2024	8	1–1	.500
Minnesota Lynx	2	2011, 2014	5	0–2	.000
Houston Comets	1	**2002**	3	1–0	1.000
Washington Mystics	1	2019	4	0–1	.000
Indiana Fever	1	**2025**	5	1–0	.000
Totals	29		77	16–13	.552

== Los Angeles Sparks ==
Opponent	S	Occurrences	GP	Rec	%
Seattle Storm	6	**2002**, **2006**, **2008**, **2009**, 2010, **2019**	14	5–1	.833
Sacramento Monarchs	6	**1999**, **2001**, **2003**, 2004, 2005, 2006	14	3–3	.500
Minnesota Lynx	6	**2003**, 2012, 2015, **2016**, 2017, **2018**	19	3–3	.500
Phoenix Mercury	5	**2000**, 2009, 2013, 2014, **2017**	13	2–3	.400
Las Vegas Aces	3	**2002**, 2008, **2012**	7	2–1	.667
Houston Comets	3	1999, 2000, **2001**	7	1–2	.333
Connecticut Sun	2	2019, 2020	4	0–2	.000
Charlotte Sting	1	**2002**	2	1–0	1.000
New York Liberty	1	**2002**	2	1–0	1.000
Chicago Sky	1	**2016**	4	1–0	1.000
Dallas Wings	1	2003	3	0–1	.000
Washington Mystics	1	2018	1	0–1	.000
Totals	36		90	19–17	.528

== Minnesota Lynx ==
Opponent	S	Occurrences	GP	Rec	%
Phoenix Mercury	8	**2011**, **2013**, 2014, **2015**, **2016**, **2020**, **2024**, 2025	19	6–2	.750
Los Angeles Sparks	6	2003, **2012**, **2015**, 2016, **2017**, 2018	19	3–3	.500
Seattle Storm	5	2004, **2012**, **2013**, 2019, 2020	11	2–3	.400
Atlanta Dream	2	**2011**, **2013**	6	2–0	1.000
Las Vegas Aces	2	**2011**, **2014**	5	2–0	1.000
Indiana Fever	2	2012, **2015**	9	1–1	.500
Connecticut Sun	2	2023, **2024**	8	1–1	.500
Washington Mystics	1	**2017**	3	1–0	1.000
Golden State Valkyries	1	**2025**	2	1–0	1.000
New York Liberty	1	2024	5	0–1	.000
Chicago Sky	1	2021	1	0–1	.000
Totals	31		94	19–12	.613

== New York Liberty ==
Opponent	S	Occurrences	GP	Rec	%
Washington Mystics	5	**2000**, **2002**, **2015**, 2017, **2023**	10	4–1	.800
Indiana Fever	5	**2002**, 2005, **2010**, 2011, 2015	14	2–3	.400
Connecticut Sun	4	2004, **2008**, 2012, **2023**	11	2–2	.500
Phoenix Mercury	4	**1997**, 2016, 2021, 2025	6	1–3	.250
Dallas Wings	3	**2004**, 2007, 2008	9	1–2	.333
Houston Comets	3	1997, 1999, 2000	6	0–3	.000
Charlotte Sting	2	**1999**, 2001	6	1–1	.500
Atlanta Dream	2	2010, **2024**	4	1–1	.500
Las Vegas Aces	2	2023, **2024**	8	1–1	.500
Minnesota Lynx	1	**2024**	5	1–0	1.000
Cleveland Rockers	1	**2000**	3	1–0	1.000
Miami Sol	1	**2001**	3	1–0	1.000
Los Angeles Sparks	1	2002	2	0–1	.000
Chicago Sky	1	2022	3	0–1	.000
Totals	35		88	16–19	.457

== Phoenix Mercury ==
Opponent	S	Occurrences	GP	Rec	%
Minnesota Lynx	8	2011, 2013, **2014**, 2015, 2016, 2020, 2024, **2025**	19	2–6	.250
Seattle Storm	6	**2007**, 2010, **2011**, **2017**, 2018, **2021**	14	4–2	.667
Las Vegas Aces	6	**2007**, **2009**, **2010**, **2021**, 2022, 2025	18	4–2	.667
Los Angeles Sparks	5	2000, **2009**, **2013**, **2014**, 2017	13	3–2	.600
New York Liberty	4	1997, **2016**, **2021,** **2025**	6	3–1	.750
Dallas Wings	3	**2007**, **2015**, **2018**	8	3–0	1.000
Chicago Sky	3	**2014**, 2019, 2021	8	1–2	.333
Indiana Fever	2	**2009**, **2016**	6	2–0	1.000
Connecticut Sun	2	**2017**, **2018**	2	2–0	1.000
Cleveland Rockers	1	**1998**	3	1–0	1.000
Washington Mystics	1	**2020**	1	1–0	1.000
Houston Comets	1	1998	3	0–1	.000
Totals	42		98	26–16	.619

== Seattle Storm ==
Opponent	S	Occurrences	GP	Rec	%
Phoenix Mercury	6	2007, **2010**, 2011, 2017, **2018**, 2021	14	2–4	.333
Los Angeles Sparks	6	2002, 2006, 2008, 2009, **2010**, 2019	14	1–5	.167
Minnesota Lynx	5	**2004**, 2012, 2013, **2019**, **2020**	11	3–2	.600
Las Vegas Aces	4	**2020**, 2022, 2024, 2025	14	1–3	.250
Washington Mystics	2	**2018**, **2022**	5	2–0	1.000
Atlanta Dream	2	**2010**, 2016	4	1–1	.500
Connecticut Sun	1	**2004**	3	1–0	1.000
Sacramento Monarchs	1	**2004**	3	1–0	1.000
Houston Comets	1	2005	3	0–1	.000
Totals	28		69	12–16	.429

== Washington Mystics ==
Opponent	S	Occurrences	GP	Rec	%
New York Liberty	5	2000, 2002, 2015, **2017**, 2023	10	1–4	.200
Connecticut Sun	3	2004, 2006, **2019**	10	1–2	.333
Atlanta Dream	3	2010, 2013, **2018**	10	1–2	.333
Indiana Fever	2	2009, 2014	4	0–2	.000
Seattle Storm	2	2018, 2022	5	0–2	.000
Charlotte Sting	1	**2002**	2	1–0	1.000
Dallas Wings	1	**2017**	1	1–0	1.000
Los Angeles Sparks	1	**2018**	1	1–0	1.000
Las Vegas Aces	1	**2019**	4	1–0	1.000
Minnesota Lynx	1	2017	3	0–1	.000
Phoenix Mercury	1	2020	1	0–1	.000
Totals	21		50	7–14	.333

== Defunct Teams ==
=== Cleveland Rockers ===
Opponent	S	Occurrences	GP	Rec	%
Connecticut Sun	1	**2000**	3	1–0	1.000
Phoenix Mercury	1	1998	3	0–1	.000
New York Liberty	1	2000	3	0–1	.000
Charlotte Sting	1	2001	3	0–1	.000
Dallas Wings	1	2003	3	0–1	.000
Totals	5		15	1–4	.200

=== Charlotte Sting ===
Opponent	S	Occurrences	GP	Rec	%
New York Liberty	2	1999, **2001**	6	1–1	.500
Houston Comets	2	1997, 1998	3	0–2	.000
Dallas Wings	1	**1999**	1	1–0	1.000
Cleveland Rockers	1	**2001**	3	1–0	1.000
Los Angeles Sparks	1	2001	2	0–1	.000
Washington Mystics	1	2002	2	0–1	.000
Connecticut Sun	1	2003	2	0–1	.000
Totals	9		19	3–6	.333

=== Houston Comets ===
Opponent	S	Occurrences	GP	Rec	%
Sacramento Monarchs	4	**2000**, 2003, 2005, 2006	9	1–3	.250
New York Liberty	3	**1997**, **1999**, **2000**	6	3–0	1.000
Los Angeles Sparks	3	**1999**, **2000**, 2001	7	2–1	.667
Charlotte Sting	2	**1997**, **1998**	3	2–0	1.000
Phoenix Mercury	1	**1998**	3	1–0	1.000
Seattle Storm	1	**2005**	3	1–0	1.000
Las Vegas Aces	1	2002	3	0–1	.000
Totals	15		34	10–5	.667

=== Miami Sol ===
Opponent	S	Occurrences	GP	Rec	%
New York Liberty	1	2001	3	0–1	.000
Totals	1		3	0–1	.333

=== Sacramento Monarchs ===
Opponent	S	Occurrences	GP	Rec	%
Los Angeles Sparks	6	1999, 2001, 2003, **2004**, **2005**, **2006**	14	3–3	.500
Houston Comets	4	2000, **2003**, **2005**, **2006**	9	3–1	.750
Las Vegas Aces	3	**2001**, 2007, 2008	8	1–2	.333
Connecticut Sun	1	**2005**	4	1–0	1.000
Seattle Storm	1	2004	3	0–1	.000
Dallas Wings	1	2006	5	0–1	.000
Totals	16		43	8–8	.500

== Most frequent series ==
Rank	Total	Team	Record	Team	First occurrence	Last occurrence	Franchise variants
1.	8	Minnesota Lynx	6–2	Phoenix Mercury	2011	2025	
2.	6	Los Angeles Sparks	5–1	Seattle Storm	2002	2019	
2.	6	Los Angeles Sparks	3–3	Sacramento Monarchs	1999	2006	
2.	6	Los Angeles Sparks	3–3	Minnesota Lynx	2003	2018	
2.	6	Phoenix Mercury	4–2	Seattle Storm	2007	2021	
2.	6	Phoenix Mercury	4–2	Las Vegas Aces	2007	2025	Phoenix (3–0) San Antonio; Phoenix (1–2) Las Vegas
7.	5	Indiana Fever	3–2	New York Liberty	2002	2015	
7.	5	New York Liberty	4–1	Washington Mystics	2000	2023	
7.	5	Phoenix Mercury	3–2	Los Angeles Sparks	2000	2017	
7.	5	Seattle Storm	3–2	Minnesota Lynx	2004	2020	
11.	4	Phoenix Mercury	3–1	New York Liberty	1997	2025	
11.	4	Sacramento Monarchs	3–1	Houston Comets	2000	2006	
11.	4	Dallas Wings	3–1	Indiana Fever	2006	2009	Detroit (3–1) Indiana
11.	4	Las Vegas Aces	3–1	Seattle Storm	2020	2025	
11.	4	Connecticut Sun	2–2	Dallas Wings	2003	2022	Connecticut (1–2) Detroit; Connecticut (1–0) Dallas
11.	4	Connecticut Sun	2–2	New York Liberty	2004	2023	
11.	4	Connecticut Sun	2–2	Indiana Fever	2005	2024	
11.	4	Atlanta Dream	2–2	Indiana Fever	2011	2025	

== See also ==
- Basketball
- Women's National Basketball Association
