= Tamika Catchings =

American basketball player (born 1979)

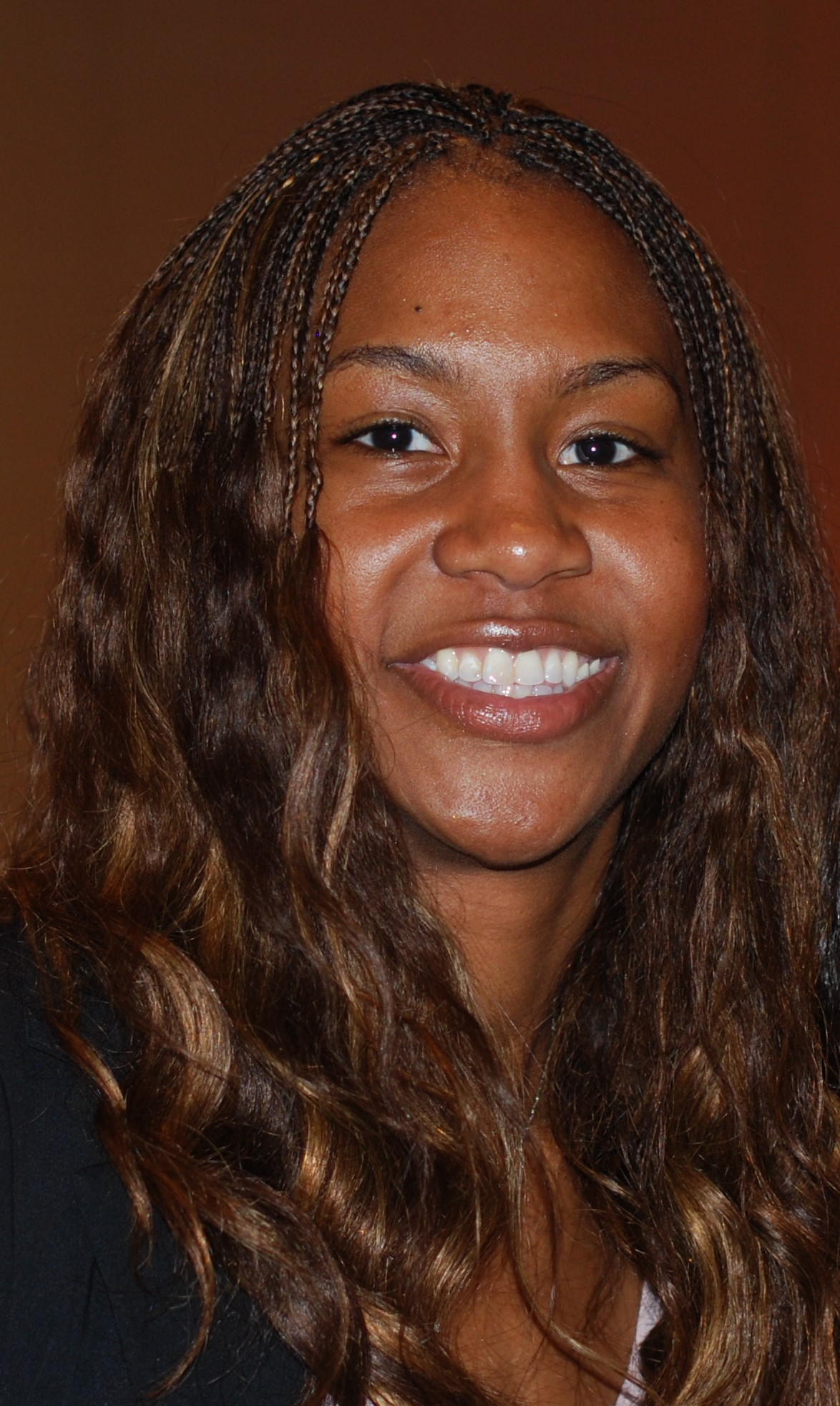
- Catchings in 2011

Personal information
- Born: July 21, 1979 (age 47) Stratford, New Jersey, U.S.
- Listed height: 6 ft 1 in (1.85 m)
- Listed weight: 167 lb (76 kg)

Career information
- High school: Adlai E. Stevenson (Lincolnshire, Illinois); Duncanville (Duncanville, Texas)
- College: Tennessee (1997–2001)
- WNBA draft: 2001: 1st round, 3rd overall pick
- Drafted by: Indiana Fever
- Playing career: 2002–2016
- Position: Small forward
- Number: 24

Career history
- 2002–2016: Indiana Fever
- 2003: Chuncheon Woori Bank Hansae
- 2005–2006: Spartak Moscow
- 2006–2007: Chuncheon Woori Bank Hansae
- 2008–2009: Lotos Gdynia
- 2009–2011: Galatasaray

Career highlights
- WNBA champion (2012); WNBA Finals MVP (2012); WNBA MVP (2011); 10× WNBA All-Star (2002, 2003, 2005–2007, 2009, 2011, 2013–2015); 7× All-WNBA First Team (2002, 2003, 2006, 2009–2012); 5× All-WNBA Second Team (2004, 2005, 2007, 2013, 2015); 5× WNBA Defensive Player of the Year (2005, 2006, 2009, 2010, 2012); 10× WNBA All-Defensive First Team (2005–2013, 2015); 2× WNBA All-Defensive Second Team (2014, 2016); 8× WNBA steals leader (2002, 2005–2007, 2009, 2010, 2013, 2016); WNBA Rookie of the Year (2002); WNBA anniversary teams (10th, 15th, 20th, 25th); No. 24 retired by Indiana Fever; 3× Kim Perrot Sportsmanship Award (2010, 2013, 2016); 2× Dawn Staley Leadership Award (2008, 2016); Polish National League champion (2009); 2× Turkish Cup winner (2010, 2011); NCAA champion (1998); AP Player of the Year (2000); Naismith College Player of the Year (2000); USBWA National Player of the Year (2000); WBCA Player of the Year (2000); 2× First-team All-American – AP (1999, 2000); 2× Second-team All-American – AP (1998, 2001); 4× Kodak All-American (1998–2001); 3× All-American – USBWA (1999–2001); Second-team All-SEC (2001); 3× First-team All-SEC (1998–2000); USBWA National Freshman of the Year (1998); SEC Freshman of the Year (1998); SEC All-Freshman Team (1998); Naismith Prep Player of the Year (1997); Texas Miss Basketball (1997); Illinois Miss Basketball (1995)

Career WNBA statistics
- Points: 7,380 (16.1 ppg)
- Rebounds: 3,315 (7.3 rpg)
- Assists: 1,488 (3.3 apg)
- Stats at WNBA.com
- Stats at Basketball Reference
- Basketball Hall of Fame
- Women's Basketball Hall of Fame
Medals
Women's basketball
Representing United States
Olympic Games
| Gold medal – first place | 2004 Athens | Team |
| Gold medal – first place | 2008 Beijing | Team |
| Gold medal – first place | 2012 London | Team |
| Gold medal – first place | 2016 Rio de Janeiro | Team |
World Championship
| Gold medal – first place | 2002 China |
| Gold medal – first place | 2010 Czech Republic |
| Bronze medal – third place | 2006 Brazil |
FIBA Under-19 World Cup
| Gold medal – first place | 1997 Brazil | Team competition |
FIBA Under-18 Americas Championship
| Silver medal – second place | 1996 Mexico | Team |

Tamika Devonne Catchings (born July 21, 1979) is an American former professional basketball player who played her entire 15-year career for the Indiana Fever of the Women's National Basketball Association (WNBA). Widely considered as one of the greatest female basketball players and one of the most decorated players in WNBA history, Catchings has won a WNBA championship (2012), WNBA Most Valuable Player Award (2011), WNBA Finals MVP Award (2012), five WNBA Defensive Player of the Year Awards (2005, 2006, 2009, 2010, 2012), four Olympic gold medals (2004, 2008, 2012, 2016), the WNBA Rookie of the Year Award (2002), and an NCAA championship with the University of Tennessee Lady Vols (1998). She is one of only 11 women to receive an Olympic gold medal, an NCAA Championship, a FIBA World Cup gold and a WNBA Championship. She has also been selected to ten WNBA All-Star teams, 12 All-WNBA teams, 12 All-Defensive teams and led the league in steals eight times. In 2011, Catchings was voted in by fans as one of the WNBA's Top 15 Players of All Time, and would be named to two more all-time WNBA teams, the WNBA Top 20@20 in 2016 and The W25 in 2021.

Catchings served as President of the WNBA Players Association from 2012 to 2016. She was inducted into the Women's Basketball Hall of Fame in 2020.

== Early life and college career ==
Catchings was born in New Jersey. She lived in Italy for one year while her father Harvey Catchings played professional basketball for Segafredo Gorizia, during which time she befriended Kobe Bryant. She played for both Adlai E. Stevenson High School and Duncanville High School, where she was named a WBCA All-American. Catchings participated in the WBCA High School All-America Game where she scored twelve points. She is also the first player at any level in history to be officially credited with scoring a quintuple-double (25 points, 18 rebounds, 11 assists, 10 steals and 10 blocks).

Catchings was an All-American with the Tennessee Lady Volunteers basketball for 1997–2001. She earned the Naismith College Player of the Year award, the AP Player of the Year award, the USBWA Women's National Player of the Year award, and the WBCA Player of the Year award in 2000. As a freshman on the undefeated 1997–98 National champions, she was part of the "Three Meeks" with Semeka Randall and Chamique Holdsclaw.

== College statistics ==
Legend
| GP | Games played | GS | Games started | MPG | Minutes per game |
| FG% | Field goal percentage | 3P% | 3-point field goal percentage | FT% | Free throw percentage |
| RPG | Rebounds per game | APG | Assists per game | SPG | Steals per game |
| BPG | Blocks per game | PPG | Points per game | **Bold** | Career high |

| Year | Team | GP | Points | FG% | 3P% | FT% | RPG | APG | SPG | BPG | PPG |
|---|---|---|---|---|---|---|---|---|---|---|---|
| 1998 | Tennessee | **39** | **711** | **.537** | **.364** | .760 | 8.0 | 2.4 | 2.6 | **1.6** | **18.2** |
| 1999 | Tennessee | 34 | 563 | .513 | .279 | .775 | 7.3 | 2.8 | **2.6** | 0.9 | 16.6 |
| 2000 | Tennessee | 37 | 580 | .475 | .331 | .767 | 7.9 | 2.7 | 2.5 | 0.8 | 15.7 |
| 2001 | Tennessee | 17 | 259 | .477 | .343 | **.806** | **8.8** | **2.9** | 1.8 | 1.2 | 15.2 |
| Career | | 127 | 2,113 | .505 | .333 | .771 | 7.9 | 2.7 | 2.4 | 1.1 | 16.6 |

== WNBA career ==
Catchings was drafted 3rd overall by the Indiana Fever in 2001. Unable to play in the 2001 season due to an ACL injury sustained during her senior year at Tennessee, she had an outstanding year in 2002 and was named WNBA Rookie of the Year while averaging 18.6 ppg, immediately making an impact on the Fever roster in her first year as a pro. During her rookie season, in a regular season game against the Minnesota Lynx, Catchings had tied a then WNBA record, 9 steals (which has since been broken by Ticha Penicheiro). That year, the Fever made it to the playoffs and despite losing 2–1 in the first round, Catchings had a dominant series, averaging a playoff career-high 20.3 ppg.

Catchings's best season of her career would be in the 2003 season, where she averaged a career-high 19.7 ppg although the Fever never made it to the playoffs that year.

In 2005, Catchings scored her 2,000th point in the Women's National Basketball Association. With this she became the fourth fastest player to score 2000 career points in the WNBA, reaching the milestone in only four seasons of play. She is also the fastest to 1,000 rebounds, 400 assists, and 300 steals. In 2005, Catchings was also named the WNBA Defensive Player of the Year. Catchings then repeated as Defensive Player of the Year in 2006. She was again named Defensive Player of the Year in 2009, 2010 and 2012.

In 2006, Catchings was voted into the 2006 WNBA All-Star Game, and was also the leading vote-getter, but had to sit out because of a foot injury. At half-time she was announced as a member of the All-Decade Team along with nine other players and former Comets coach Van Chancellor. Five years later she was voted in by fans as one of the Top 15 players in the fifteen-year history of the WNBA.

Months before the 2008 season, the Fever traded for hometown all-star shooting guard Katie Douglas (who would play with the team until 2013) to pair up with Catchings, forming an all-star duo to compete for a championship and strengthen their lineup. However, the Fever fell way short of championship contention in 2008 as they were eliminated in the first round by the Detroit Shock during the playoffs.

In 2009, the Fever would have more postseason success, as the chemistry developed between Catchings and Douglas, the Fever would advance to the WNBA finals, making it Catchings's first finals appearance. Prior to this, Catchings led the league in steals with 2.9 spg and helped lead the Fever to a 22–12 record, earning the top seed in the Eastern Conference. In the finals they faced the Phoenix Mercury and had a 2–1 series lead but would lose the next two games to be defeated in the finals 3–2.

In 2011, Catchings won WNBA Most Valuable Player while averaging 15.5 ppg, 7.1 rpg, 3.5 apg and 2.0 spg also leading the Fever to a 21–13 record, topping the Eastern Conference standings. However, in the playoffs she performed poorly offensively averaging a playoff career low 10.0 ppg. The Fever would end up making it to the Eastern Conference finals where they got eliminated 2–1 to the Atlanta Dream. In game 2 of the series, Catchings suffered a right foot injury. Although she was able to play in game 3, she had a sub-par performance following the injury, playing only 10 minutes and was 0 for 4 from the field.

In 2012, the Fever made a change in their starting line-up, with Douglas playing the small forward, Catchings at power forward and Shavonte Zellous at shooting guard during the regular season. The Fever finished second in the Eastern Conference with a 22–12 record. They made it back to finals that year, this time against the championship defending Minnesota Lynx, but they would defeat Minnesota 3–1 in the series becoming only the second Eastern Conference franchise to win a WNBA title, despite playing without Katie Douglas who suffered an ankle injury in the Conference finals. Catchings scored a game-high 25 points in the final game of the series and also won WNBA Finals MVP. In February 2013, Catchings signed a multi-year contract with the Fever.

In 2014, Catchings missed the Fever's first 17 games of the season with a sore back. She returned six games prior to the 2014 WNBA All-Star Game in which she was selected to play. During the all-star game, Catchings scored a game winning basket for the Eastern Conference all-star team to put them up 125–124 with 6 seconds left in overtime. Later on in the season, the Fever finished second in the East with a 16–18 record. On August 23, 2014, Catchings became the WNBA's all-time leading playoff scorer after making a three-point field goal in Game 3 of the Eastern Conference semifinals against the Washington Mystics surpassing Lisa Leslie's 908 career playoff points. She finished the game with 22 points, 10 rebounds and 7 steals also surpassing Lisa Leslie for most WNBA career playoff rebounds (471). The Fever would then advance to the Conference Finals and were one win away from advancing to the 2014 WNBA Finals but lost 2–1 to the Chicago Sky.

In October 2014 in a TV interview, Catchings revealed that she would be retiring after the 2016 Summer Olympics. She said:

I will be retiring in 2016, Lord willing, if my body holds up. Although I plan to step away as a player that is not to say I'll step away from the game, hopefully. I am so thankful and blessed to have had an opportunity to play the game I have loved for so long. God has truly blessed me with an amazing playing career, and now it's time to start transitioning to what He has for me beyond the lines of the basketball floor.

In the 2015 season, Catchings was voted as a WNBA All-Star for the 10th time in her career while averaging 13.1 ppg, passing Tina Thompson for most all-star appearances. With a new all-star sidekick Marissa Coleman joining her in the frontcourt, the Fever finished third in the Eastern Conference with a 20–14 record and made it back to the finals for the first time in three years for a rematch with the Minnesota Lynx, this time with Minnesota winning the series 3–2.

In the 2016 season, Catchings caught her 3,308th rebound in a regular season game loss to the Minnesota Lynx becoming the WNBA all-time leader in regular season rebounds also passing Lisa Leslie. Prior to becoming the WNBA all-time leading rebounder, Catchings had also become only the second player in WNBA history to have 7,000 points and 3,000 rebounds in the month of May. Catchings's final WNBA game was on September 21, 2016, in a first round playoff game loss to the Phoenix Mercury, due to the WNBA's new playoff format that had just been in effect, where the first and second rounds contains only a single elimination game instead of the traditional best-of-3 series. Also teams get seeded based on overall league standings instead of conference standings with the top two seeded teams receiving double byes to the semifinals (the last round before the WNBA finals) as well as the third and fourth seeded teams receiving byes to the second round. Catchings scored 13 points and grabbed 10 rebounds in 30 minutes of play.

As of her retirement, Catchings ranked 1st all-time in career playoff scoring, 1st all-time in career playoff rebounds, 2nd in all-time regular season rebounds, 2nd in all-time career regular season scoring, 1st in total career steals and 1st in career steals per game average. She also holds another WNBA record for most consecutive playoff appearances of 12 straight seasons. Catchings had also appeared in 3 WNBA finals. She was also listed in the WNBA Top 20@20, a list of the league's best 20 players ever in celebration of the WNBA's 20th season in 2016, and The W25, a similar list of 25 players announced during the league's 25th season in 2021.

== WNBA career statistics ==
Legend
| GP | Games played | GS | Games started | MPG | Minutes per game | RPG | Rebounds per game |
| APG | Assists per game | SPG | Steals per game | BPG | Blocks per game | PPG | Points per game |
| TO | Turnovers per game | FG% | Field-goal percentage | 3P% | 3-point field-goal percentage | FT% | Free-throw percentage |
| **Bold** | Career best | ° | League leader |

| † | Denotes seasons in which Catchings won a WNBA championship |
| ‡ | WNBA record |

=== Regular season ===
| Year | Team | GP | GS | MPG | FG% | 3P% | FT% | RPG | APG | SPG | BPG | TO | PPG |
|---|---|---|---|---|---|---|---|---|---|---|---|---|---|
| 2002 | Indiana | 32 | 32 | **36.5** | .419 | .394 | .815 | 8.6 | 3.7 | 2.9° | **1.3** | 2.6 | 18.6 |
| 2003 | Indiana | **34** | **34** | 35.6° | .432 | .387 | .847 | 8.0 | 3.4 | 2.1 | 1.0 | **3.0** | **19.7** |
| 2004 | Indiana | **34** | 33 | 33.8 | .385 | .335 | .854 | 7.3 | 3.4 | 2.0 | 1.1 | 2.3 | 16.7 |
| 2005 | Indiana | **34** | **34** | 34.5 | .383 | .285 | .788 | 7.8 | 4.2 | 2.6° | 0.5 | 2.7 | 14.7 |
| 2006 | Indiana | 32 | 32 | 33.5 | .407 | .299 | .809 | 7.5 | 3.7 | 2.9° | 1.1 | 2.5 | 16.3 |
| 2007 | Indiana | 21 | 21 | 32.3 | .417 | .311 | .820 | **9.0** | **4.7** | **3.1**° | 1.0 | 2.9 | 16.6 |
| 2008 | Indiana | 25 | 17 | 27.8 | .391 | .432 | .800 | 6.3 | 3.3 | 2.0 | 0.4 | 2.4 | 13.3 |
| 2009 | Indiana | **34** | **34** | 31.9 | .386 | .328 | .873 | 7.2 | 3.1 | 2.9° | 0.5 | 2.6 | 15.1 |
| 2010 | Indiana | **34** | **34** | 31.4 | **.484** | **.448** | .849 | 7.1 | 4.0 | 2.3° | 0.9 | 2.7 | 18.2 |
| 2011 | Indiana | 33 | 33 | 31.5 | .438 | .348 | **.883** | 7.1 | 3.5 | 2.0 | 0.9 | 2.2 | 15.5 |
| 2012^{†} | Indiana | **34** | **34** | 30.5 | .432 | .379 | .864 | 7.6 | 3.1 | 2.1 | 0.8 | 1.7 | 17.4 |
| 2013 | Indiana | 30 | 30 | 31.4 | .396 | .321 | .861 | 7.1 | 2.4 | 2.8 | 1.0 | 1.7 | 17.7 |
| 2014 | Indiana | 16 | 16 | 26.8 | .446 | .368 | .790 | 6.4 | 1.9 | 1.7 | 0.8 | 2.1 | 16.1 |
| 2015 | Indiana | 30 | 30 | 26.6 | .382 | .295 | .868 | 7.1 | 2.2 | 1.8 | 0.8 | 1.6 | 13.1 |
| 2016 | Indiana | **34** | **34** | 24.8 | .433 | .350 | .862 | 4.8 | 1.9 | 1.8 | 0.2 | 1.2 | 12.7 |
| Career | 15 years | 457 | 448 | 31.5 | .415 | .355 | .840 | 7.3 | 3.3 | 2.4 | 0.8 | 2.3 | 16.1 |

=== Postseason ===
| Year | Team | GP | GS | MPG | FG% | 3P% | FT% | RPG | APG | SPG | BPG | TO | PPG |
|---|---|---|---|---|---|---|---|---|---|---|---|---|---|
| 2002 | Indiana | 3 | 3 | 34.3 | **.489** | .381 | .818 | 10.7 | 2.3 | 1.3 | 0.3 | **3.7** | **20.3** |
| 2005 | Indiana | 4 | 4 | 36.5 | .356 | .417 | .786 | 9.2 | 2.2 | 2.0 | 0.2 | 2.7 | 17.2 |
| 2006 | Indiana | 2 | 2 | 31.0 | .323 | **.500** | .667 | 6.0 | 3.5 | 1.0 | 0.5 | 3.0 | 14.0 |
| 2007 | Indiana | 6 | 6 | 32.7 | .370 | .263 | .878 | **11.0** | 3.2 | 2.2 | 0.5 | 1.7 | 15.8 |
| 2008 | Indiana | 3 | 3 | **37.7** | .441 | .273 | **.933** | 7.7 | **6.0** | 1.0 | 0.7 | **3.7** | **20.3** |
| 2009 | Indiana | 10 | 10 | 35.7 | .459 | .250 | .850 | 10.4 | 5.4 | **3.3** | **1.4** | 3.4 | 17.2 |
| 2010 | Indiana | 3 | 3 | 35.7 | .413 | .357 | .813 | 8.7 | 3.0 | 3.0 | 0.7 | 1.0 | 18.7 |
| 2011 | Indiana | 6 | 5 | 31.7 | .333 | .267 | .783 | 8.3 | 2.3 | 2.2 | 0.5 | 2.5 | 10.0 |
| 2012^{†} | Indiana | 10 | 10 | 34.7 | .376 | .327 | .897 | 8.5 | 3.1 | 2.3 | 1.8 | 2.7 | 19.0 |
| 2013 | Indiana | 4 | 4 | 31.0 | .431 | .333 | .781 | 7.8 | 2.5 | 1.5 | 0.8 | 2.2 | 18.5 |
| 2014 | Indiana | 5 | 5 | 34.0 | .311 | .111 | .900 | 9.2 | 3.2 | 2.6 | 0.6 | 2.0 | 16.6 |
| 2015 | Indiana | **11** | **11** | 32.7 | .433 | .469 | .857 | 6.9 | 2.6 | 2.0 | 1.0 | 2.6 | 16.3 |
| 2016 | Indiana | 1 | 1 | 29.9 | .333 | .000 | .833 | 10.0 | 0.0 | 3.0 | 0.0 | 3.0 | 13.0 |
| Career | 13 years | 68 | 67 | 34.0 | .397 | .328 | .854 | 8.8 | 3.3 | 2.2‡ | 0.9 | 2.6 | 16.8 |

== USA Basketball ==
Catchings was named to the USA Basketball Women's Junior National Team (now called the U18 team). The team participated in the third Junior World Championship, held in Chetumal, Mexico in late August and early September 1996. The USA team won their early games easily, but lost by four points to the team from Brazil, ending up with the silver medal for the event.

Catchings continued with the team when it was invited to the 1997 FIBA Junior World Championship (now called U19) held in Natal, Brazil. After beating Japan, the next game was against Australia, the defending champion. The USA team pulled out to a 13-point lead in the second half, but gave up the lead and lost the game 80–74. She had a double-double in the game with 17 points and ten rebounds. The USA rebounded with a close 92–88 victory over Cuba, helped by 23 points each from Maylana Martin and Lynn Pride. The USA then went on to beat previously unbeaten Russia. After winning the next two games, the USA faced Australia in the gold medal game. The USA team has a three-point lead late, but the Aussies hit a three-pointer with three seconds left in regulation to force overtime. Although the Aussies scored first, Catchings scored to tie the game, then the USA pulled into the lead and held on to win 78–74 to earn the gold, and the first medal for a USA team at a Junior World Championship. Catchings was the second leading scorer for the USA team with 13.2 points per game and the leading rebounder with 7.2 per game.

In 1998, Catchings was named to the team representing the US at the William Jones Cup competition in Taipei, Taiwan. The USA team won all five games, earning the gold medal for the competition. Catchings averaged 6.4 points per game over the five games.

Catchings played for the USA women's basketball team at the 2004 Summer Olympic Games in Athens, helping the team win the gold medal.

Catchings was invited to the USA Basketball Women's National Team training camp in the fall of 2009. The team selected to play for the 2010 FIBA World Championship and the 2012 Olympics is usually chosen from these participants.

Catchings was selected to be a member of the National team representing the US at the World Championships held in September and October 2010. The team was coached by Geno Auriemma. Because many team members were still playing in the WNBA until just prior to the event, the team had only one day of practice with the entire team before leaving for Ostrava and Karlovy Vary, Czech Republic. Even with limited practice, the team managed to win its first games against Greece by 26 points. The team continued to dominate with victory margins exceeding 20 points in the first five games. Several players shared scoring honors, with Swin Cash, Angel McCoughtry, Maya Moore, Diana Taurasi, Lindsay Whalen, and Sylvia Fowles all ending as high scorer in the first few games. The sixth game was against undefeated Australia—the USA jumped out to a 24-point lead and the USA prevailed 83–75. The USA won its next two games by over 30 points, then faced the host team, the Czech Republic, in the championship game. The USA team had only a five-point lead at halftime, which was cut to three points, but the Czechs never got closer. Team USA went on to win the championship and gold medal. Catchings averaged 8.8 points per game.

Catchings was named as one of the National team members to represent the USA Basketball team in the WNBA versus USA Basketball. This game replaces the normal WNBA All-Star game with WNBA All-Stars versus USA Basketball, as part of the preparation for the FIBA World Championship for Women to be held in the Czech Republic during September and October 2010.

Catchings was one of 21 finalists for the U.S. Women's Olympic Basketball Team Roster. The 20 professional women's basketball players, plus one collegiate player (Brittney Griner), were selected by the USA Basketball Women's National Team Player Selection Committee to compete for the final roster which will represent the US at the 2012 Olympics in London. She was selected for the final roster, and was part of the US team that won the gold medal.

In the 2016 Summer Olympics, Catchings played for Team USA and earned her fourth Olympic gold medal as they beat Spain 101–72.

== Overseas career ==
Catchings played her first year overseas during the WNBA offseason in 2003, she played in South Korea for Asan Woori Bank Wibee. In the 2005–06 off-season, Catchings played for Spartak Moscow in the Russian League. Catchings would once again play in South Korea for Chuncheon Woori Bank Hansae in the 2006 and 2007 off-seasons. In the 2008–09 off-season, Catchings played in Poland for Lotos VBW Clima Gdynia and would play two consecutive off-seasons in the Turkish League from 2009 to 2011 for Galatasaray. In Catchings's first season with Galatasaray, she played with then Indiana Fever teammate, Katie Douglas.

== Life after basketball ==
In January 2017, it was announced that Catchings will serve as a game analyst for Women's Basketball Games on SEC Network.

In February 2017, Catchings purchased a tea shop, Tea's Me Cafe from the previous owners on the near north side of Indianapolis that she had been frequenting while playing for the Indiana Fever. The store expanded to three locations and in-store sales by 2023.

In April 2017, Catchings was named Director of Player Programs and Franchise Development for Pacers Sports & Entertainment.

Catchings competed in the Baltimore qualifying round of Season 11 of American Ninja Warrior. The episode aired on NBC on July 1, 2019.

Catchings previously served as the Vice President of Basketball Operations and General Manager for the Indiana Fever from 2020 to 2022.

== Philanthropy and activism ==
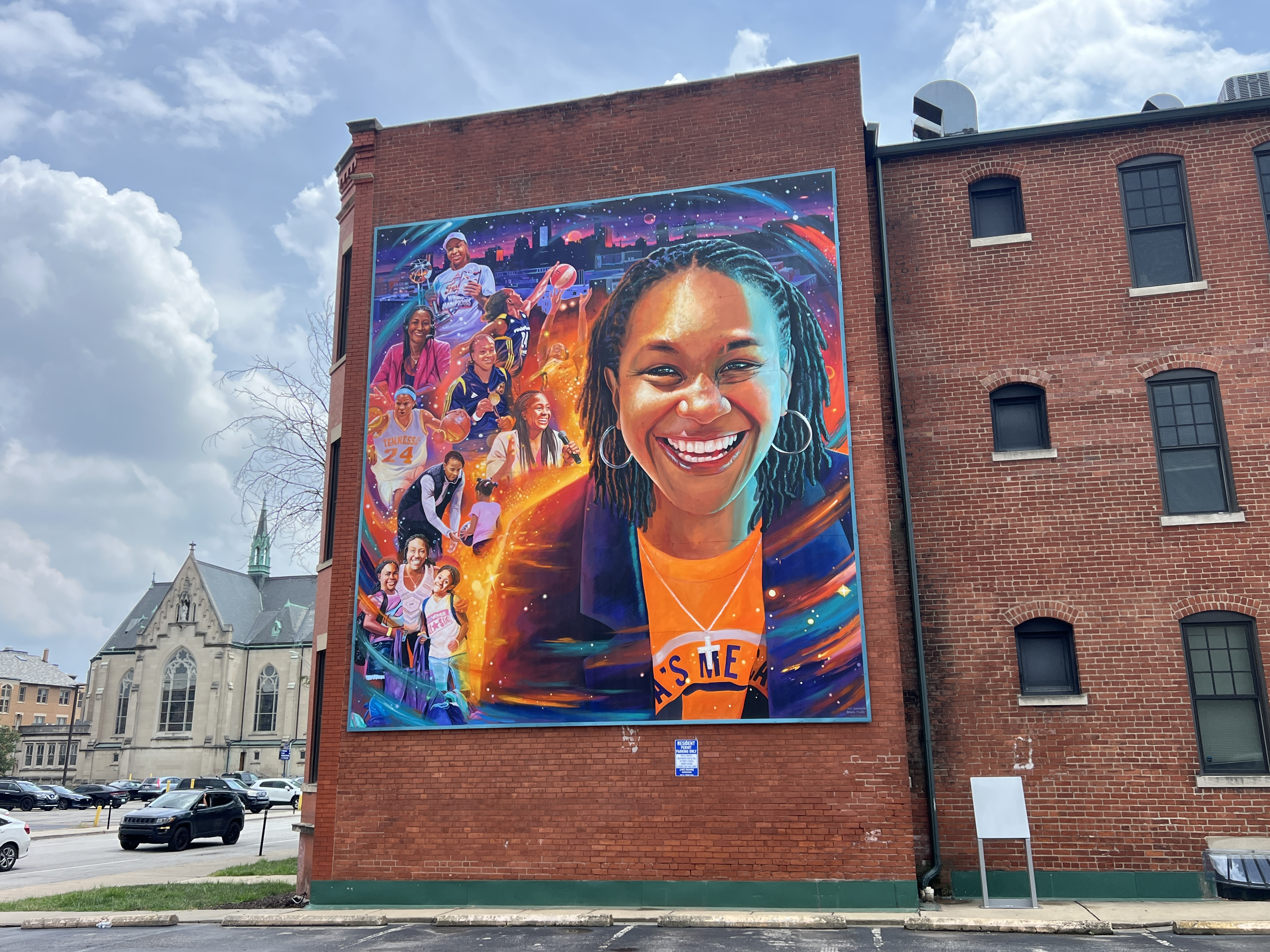
Mural depicting Catchings along Massachusetts Avenue & North New Jersey Street in downtown Indianapolis

In 2004, Catchings founded the Catch the Stars Foundation, a charitable organization that provides basketball camps, fitness clinics, mentoring and literacy programs for underprivileged children to help them become successful in sports and academics.

Catchings advocates in support of the Black Lives Matter movement and against police brutality and gun violence. Before the Olympics in Rio de Janeiro, she and Carmelo Anthony, an NBA athlete, attended a town meeting in Los Angeles to discuss violence committed by and to police officers. She and her teammates decided to kneel during the playing of the National Anthem to protest infringements upon human rights.

This game of basketball is important for a lot of reasons. One of them is bringing people together. Even uniting people. Well, we thought it was important to have a voice about something greater than basketball. But the good thing is, we were together...I am very proud of our team — as people — to be able to stand together for something we believed in"

— USA Today

At another game, she and her teammates, along with members of two other teams, were fined $500 per player and $5000 per team for wearing warm up shirts that read "#BlackLivesMatter" and "#Dallas5", in reference to violence by and against police officers.

== Personal life ==
Catchings is the daughter of former NBA player Harvey Catchings. Her sister Tauja also played basketball at Stevenson and the University of Illinois, was drafted by the WNBA and now plays in Sweden. Tamika's cousin Bobby is a starting forward for Eastern Illinois University's basketball team. Tamika majored in Sports Management at the University of Tennessee.

Catchings helped Stevenson High School to Illinois's IHSA Div. AA State Championship in her Sophomore year in 1995 under head coach Frank Mattucci before moving to Texas. During her sophomore year at Stevenson she won Illinois Ms. Basketball (at the time she was the youngest player to have won the award). In addition to leading Duncanville High to the state basketball title in her senior season (she played only two years at Duncanville after moving from the Chicago area), she also led the volleyball team to its only state title as a junior.

Catchings is hearing impaired. While living in Abilene, Texas, as a third grader, she lost her hearing aids by throwing them into a field while walking home from school; her parents, unwilling and financially unable to replace the hearing aids, told her to learn to live without them. Catchings did not resume using hearing aids until shortly before her first season at Tennessee, when head coach Pat Summitt encouraged her to do so. In 2000, she was honored with the Reynolds Society Achievement Award by the Massachusetts Eye and Ear Infirmary in Boston. On June 24, 2008, Catchings was awarded the Dawn Staley Community Leadership Award for her work in the Indianapolis community with her Catch the Stars foundation.

Catchings refereed a game of 3-on-3 basketball played by Barack Obama along with local students from Kokomo, Indiana, at the Maple Crest Middle School on April 25, 2008. Fever teammate Alison Bales also played on Obama's team.

In February 2016, Catchings married Parnell Smith, a former basketball player for the University at Buffalo. The couple first met in July 2014 through a mutual friend.

Catchings is also a Christian. She had opened up about her faith in an interview by saying "God is definitely my Savior. He's the one that walks beside me through my ups and downs and the one that keeps me focused on where I am going in life. He protects me. He provides for me. He guides me and he leads me". She became an honorary member of Delta Sigma Theta sorority in 2023.

== Awards and achievements ==
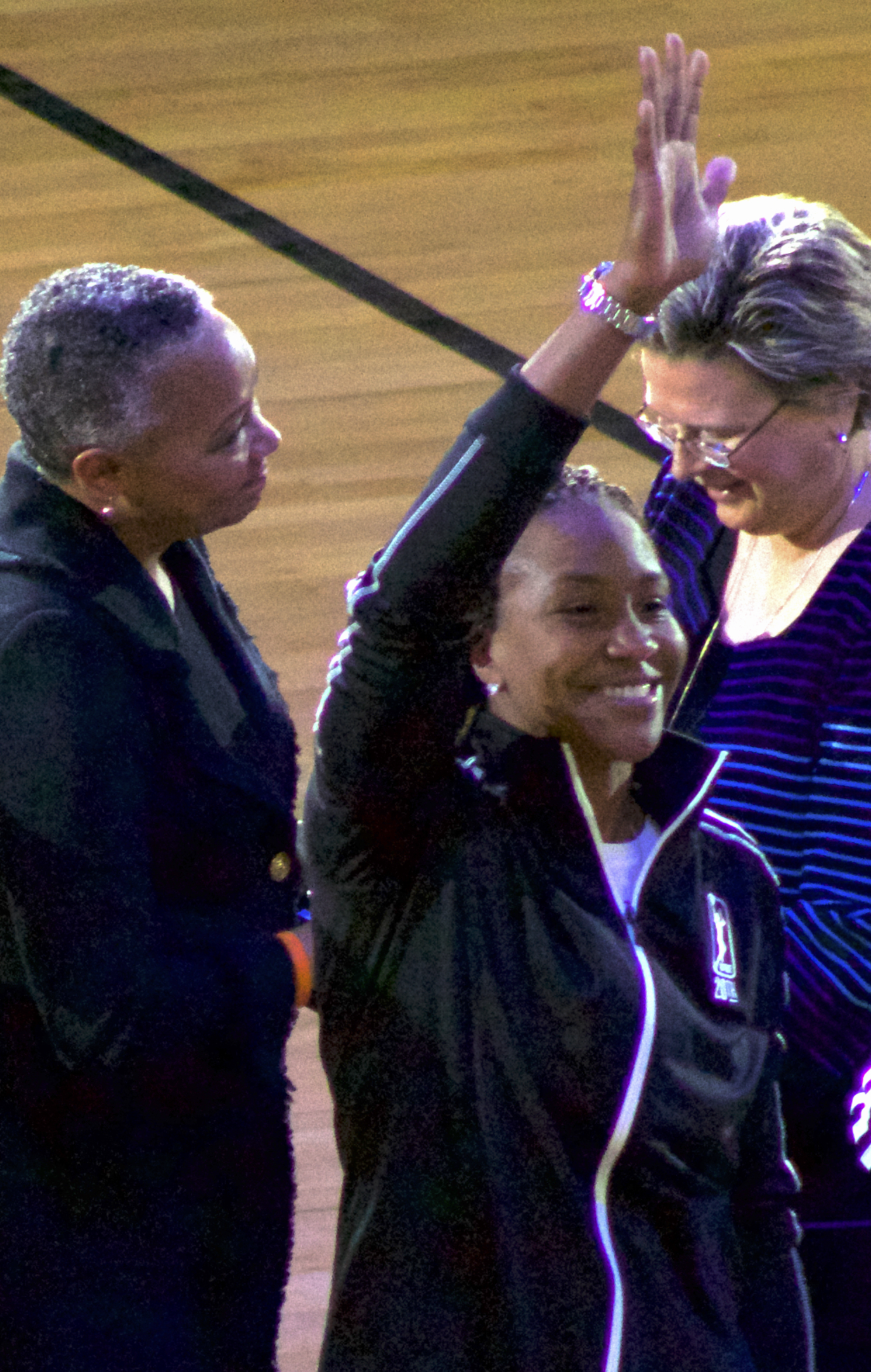
Catchings waving at the WNBA Top 20@20 ring ceremony. WNBA president Lisa Borders at left

- 2011 WNBA MVP
- 2012 WNBA Finals Most Valuable Player Award
- Ten-time WNBA All-Star Selection; appeared in nine All-Star Games. She has sole possession of the record for most appearances and selections.
- Six-time All-WNBA Team
- The first of three recorded Quintuple-double with Duncanville High School (Duncanville, Texas) with 25 points, 18 rebounds, 11 assists, 10 steals and 10 blocks in 1997.
- WBCBL Professional Basketball Trailblazer Award
- WKBL (South Korea League) 2003 Winter League, 2003 Summer League, 2006 Winter League Finals MVP
- 2010 – Kim Perrot Sportsmanship Award
- 2013 – Kim Perrot Sportsmanship Award
- 2016 – Kim Perrot Sportsmanship Award
- 2016 – awarded a star (#37) on The Flag for Hope on May 9, 2016, in recognition of her outstanding basketball career and philanthropic efforts.
- 2020 – Women's Basketball Hall of Fame Inductee
- 2024 – Kevin R. Armstrong Ethical Leadership Award (University of Indianapolis) Inaugural Recipient
- Most steals in WNBA history
- Most steals per game in WNBA history

=== Fever Franchise Records ===
- Most games played
- Most points
- Most rebounds
- Most assists
- Most steals
- Most blocks
- Most field goals made
- Most double-doubles

== See also ==
- List of WNBA career rebounding leaders
- Deaf people in the Olympics
