= 2004 WNBA playoffs =

Professional women's basketball tournament

- Dates: September 24 – October 12, 2004

Final positions
- Champions: Seattle Storm
- Runners-up: Connecticut Sun

Tournament statistics
- Scoring leader (s): Lauren Jackson (Seattle) (19.6 PPG)

Awards
- MVP: Betty Lennox (Seattle)

The 2004 WNBA playoffs was the postseason for the Women's National Basketball Association's 2004 season which ended with the Western Conference champion Seattle Storm defeating the Eastern Conference champion Connecticut Sun, 2–1. Betty Lennox was named the MVP of the Finals.

== Format ==
- The top 4 teams from each conference qualify for the playoffs.
- All 4 teams are seeded by basis of their standings.

== Regular season standings ==
Eastern Conference

Eastern Conference	W	L	PCT	GB	Home	Road	Conf.
Connecticut Sun ^{x}	18	16	.529	–	10–7	8–9	14–6
New York Liberty ^{x}	18	16	.529	–	11–6	7–10	10–10
Detroit Shock ^{x}	17	17	.500	1.0	8–9	9–8	11–9
Washington Mystics ^{x}	17	17	.500	1.0	11–6	6–11	9–11
Charlotte Sting ^{o}	16	18	.471	2.0	10–7	6–11	8–12
Indiana Fever ^{o}	15	19	.441	3.0	10–7	5–12	8–12

Western Conference

Western Conference	W	L	PCT	GB	Home	Road	Conf.
Los Angeles Sparks ^{x}	25	9	.735	–	15–2	10–7	16–6
Seattle Storm ^{x}	20	14	.588	5.0	13–4	7–10	13–9
Minnesota Lynx ^{x}	18	16	.529	7.0	11–6	7–10	12–10
Sacramento Monarchs ^{x}	18	16	.529	7.0	10–7	8–9	12–10
Phoenix Mercury ^{o}	17	17	.500	8.0	10–7	7–10	11–11
Houston Comets ^{o}	13	21	.382	12.0	9–8	4–13	7–15
San Antonio Silver Stars ^{o}	9	25	.265	16.0	6–11	3–14	6–16

Note: Teams with an "X" clinched playoff spots.

== Bracket ==
**Conference semifinals** Best-of-3
E1	**Connecticut**	2
E4	Washington	1
**Eastern Conference**
E2	**New York**	2
E3	Detroit	1
W1	Los Angeles	1
W4	**Sacramento**	2
**Western Conference**
W2	**Seattle**	2
W3	Minnesota	0

**Conference finals** Best-of-3
E1	**Connecticut**	2
E2	New York	0
W4	Sacramento	1
W2	**Seattle**	2

**WNBA Finals**; Best-of-3
E1	Connecticut	1
W2	**Seattle**	2

- **Bold** – Series winner
- Italic – Team with home-court advantage

== Conference semifinals ==
=== Eastern Conference ===
(1) Connecticut vs. (4) Washington Sun beat Mystics 2–1

- Game 1: Washington 67, Connecticut 59
- Game 2: Connecticut 80, Washington 70
- Game 3: Connecticut 76, Washington 56

(2) New York vs. (3) Detroit Liberty beat Shock 2–1

- Game 1: New York 75, Detroit 62
- Game 2: Detroit 76, New York 66
- Game 3: New York 66, Shock 64

=== Western Conference ===
(1) Los Angeles vs. (4) Sacramento Monarchs beat Sparks 2–1

- Game 1: Sacramento 72, Los Angeles 52
- Game 2: Los Angeles 71, Sacramento 57
- Game 3: Sacramento 73, Los Angeles 58

(2) Seattle vs. (3) Minnesota Storm beat Lynx 2–0

- Game 1: Seattle 70, Minnesota 58
- Game 2: Seattle 64, Minnesota 54

== Conference finals ==
=== Eastern Conference ===
Connecticut Sun vs. New York Liberty Sun beat Liberty 2–0

- Game 1: Connecticut 61, New York 51
- Game 2: Connecticut 60, New York 57

=== Western Conference ===
Seattle Storm vs. Sacramento Monarchs Storm beat Monarchs 2–1

- Game 1: Sacramento 74, Seattle 72
- Game 2: Seattle 66, Sacramento 54
- Game 3: Seattle 82, Sacramento 62

== WNBA Finals ==
Seattle Storm vs. Connecticut Sun Storm beat Sun

- Game 1:Sun 68, Storm 64
- Game 2:Storm 67, Sun 65
- Game 3:Storm 74, Sun 60

== See also ==
- List of WNBA Champions
