= 2009 WNBA playoffs =

Professional women's basketball tournament

- Dates: September 16 – October 9, 2009

Final positions
- Champions: Phoenix Mercury (Finals Champion)
- Runners-up: Indiana Fever

Tournament statistics
- Attendance: 9,979 per game
- Scoring leader (s): Diana Taurasi (Phoenix) (22.3 PPG)

Awards
- MVP: Diana Taurasi (Phoenix)

The 2009 WNBA playoffs is the postseason for the Women's National Basketball Association's 2009 season.

== Format ==
- The top 4 teams from each conference qualify for the playoffs.
  - All 4 teams are seeded based on their standings.
- For rounds one and two, the teams compete in a best-of-three format with Games 2 and 3 on the home court of the team with the higher seed.
- The series for the WNBA Finals is in a best-of-five format with Games 1, 2 and 5 on the home court of the team with the higher seed.

== Playoff qualifying ==
Eastern Conference

The following teams clinched a playoff berth in the East:

1. Indiana Fever (22–12)
2. Atlanta Dream (18–16)
3. Detroit Shock (18–16)
4. Washington Mystics (16–18)

Western Conference

The following teams clinched a playoff berth in the West:

1. Phoenix Mercury (23–11)
2. Seattle Storm (20–14)
3. Los Angeles Sparks (18–16)
4. San Antonio Silver Stars (15–19)

== Bracket ==
This was the outlook for the 2009 WNBA playoffs. Teams in italics had home court advantage. Teams in bold advanced to the next round. Numbers to the left of each team indicate the team's original playoffs seeding in their respective conferences. Numbers to the right of each team indicate the number of games the team won in that round.

**Conference semifinals** Best-of-3
E1	**Indiana**	2
E4	Washington	0
**Eastern Conference**
E2	Atlanta	0
E3	**Detroit**	2
W1	**Phoenix**	2
W4	San Antonio	1
**Western Conference**
W2	Seattle	1
W3	**Los Angeles**	2

**Conference finals** Best-of-3
E1	**Indiana**	2
E3	Detroit	1
W1	**Phoenix**	2
W3	Los Angeles	1

**WNBA Finals**; Best-of-5
E1	Indiana	2
W1	**Phoenix**	3

- **Bold** – Series winner
- Italic – Team with home-court advantage

== Eastern Conference ==
=== First round ===
==== (1) Indiana Fever vs. (4) Washington Mystics ====
ESPN2HD

September 17
8:00 p.m.

Game 1

**Indiana Fever** **88**, Washington Mystics 79
Pts: Catchings (26); Rebs: Catchings (12)	Pts: Langhorne (18); Rebs: Langhorne (10)

Comcast Center, College Park, MD
Attendance: 6,332

NBA TV

September 19
7:00 p.m.

Game 2

Washington Mystics 74, **Indiana Fever** **81** (OT)
Pts: Langhorne (15); Rebs: Currie (14)	Pts: Catchings (24); Rebs: Catchings (16)
**Indiana won the series 2–0**

Conseco Fieldhouse, Indianapolis, IN
Attendance: 9,655

==== (2) Atlanta Dream vs. (3) Detroit Shock ====
ESPN2HD

September 16
8:00 p.m.

Game 1

Atlanta Dream 89, **Detroit Shock** **94**
Pts: Castro Marques (25); Rebs: Lyttle (9)	Pts: Nolan (25); Rebs: Ford (10)

The Palace of Auburn Hills, Auburn Hills, MI
Attendance: 6,122

NBA TV

September 18
7:30 p.m.

Game 2

**Detroit Shock** **94**, Atlanta Dream 79
Pts: Nolan (22); Rebs: Braxton, Hornbuckle (8)	Pts: Latta (21); Rebs: de Souza (7)
**Detroit won the series 2–0**

Arena at Gwinnett Center, Duluth, GA
Attendance: 4,780

=== Conference Finals: (1) Indiana Fever vs. (3) Detroit Shock ===
ESPN2HD

September 23
8:00 p.m.

Game 1

Indiana Fever 56, **Detroit Shock** **72**
Pts: Douglas (16); Rebs: Catchings (11)	Pts: Zellous (23); Rebs: Braxton, Ford (9)

The Palace of Auburn Hills, Auburn Hills, MI
Attendance: 7,214

NBA TV

September 25
7:00 p.m.

Game 2

Detroit Shock 75, **Indiana Fever** **79**
Pts: Nolan (23); Rebs: Ford (13)	Pts: Catchings (22); Rebs: Catchings (9)

Conseco Fieldhouse, Indianapolis, IN
Attendance: 9,210

NBA TV

September 26
7:00 p.m.

Game 3

Detroit Shock 67, **Indiana Fever** **72**
Pts: Nolan (16); Rebs: Ford (11)	Pts: Sutton-Brown (17); Rebs: Catchings (8)
**Indiana won the series 2–1**

Conseco Fieldhouse, Indianapolis, IN
Attendance: 18,165

== Western Conference ==
=== First round ===
==== (1) Phoenix Mercury vs. (4) San Antonio Silver Stars ====
ESPN2HD

September 17
10:00 p.m.

Game 1

Phoenix Mercury 91, **San Antonio Silver Stars** **92**
Pts: Taylor (18); Rebs: Taurasi (7)	Pts: Young (24); Rebs: Wauters (11)

AT&T Center, San Antonio, TX
Attendance: 5,721

NBA TV

September 19
10:00 p.m.

Game 2

San Antonio Silver Stars 78, **Phoenix Mercury** **106**
Pts: Young (19); Rebs: Wauters (5)	Pts: Taurasi (24); Rebs: Bonner (13)

US Airways Center, Phoenix, AZ
Attendance: 7,267

ESPN2HD

September 21
10:00 p.m.

Game 3

San Antonio Silver Stars 92, **Phoenix Mercury** **100**
Pts: Hammon (29); Rebs: Young (8)	Pts: Taurasi (30); Rebs: T. Smith (8)
**Phoenix won the series 2–1**

US Airways Center, Phoenix, AZ
Attendance: 6,896

==== (2) Seattle Storm vs. (3) Los Angeles Sparks ====
ESPN2HD

September 16
10:00 p.m.

Game 1

Seattle Storm 63, **Los Angeles Sparks** **70**
Pts: Cash (24); Rebs: Batkovic-Brown (7)	Pts: Thompson (16); Rebs: Leslie, Parker (10)

Staples Center, Los Angeles, CA
Attendance: 7,919

NBA TV

September 18
10:00 p.m.

Game 2

Los Angeles Sparks 74, **Seattle Storm** **75**
Pts: Lennox (17); Rebs: Leslie (14)	Pts: Cash (18); Rebs: Wright (6)

KeyArena, Seattle, WA
Attendance: 8,854

ESPN2HD

September 20
5:00 p.m.

Game 3

**Los Angeles Sparks** **75**, Seattle Storm 64
Pts: Parker (22); Rebs: Milton-Jones (9)	Pts: Cash (21); Rebs: Cash (10)
**Los Angeles won the series 2–1**

KeyArena, Seattle, WA
Attendance: 8,159

=== Conference Finals: (1) Phoenix Mercury vs. (3) Los Angeles Sparks ===
ESPN2HD

September 23
10:00 p.m.

Game 1

**Phoenix Mercury** **103**, Los Angeles Sparks 94
Pts: Taurasi (28); Rebs: T. Smith (6)	Pts: Parker (28); Rebs: Parker (10)

Pauley Pavilion, Los Angeles, CA
Attendance: 6,389

NBA TV

September 25
10:00 p.m.

Game 2

**Los Angeles Sparks** **87**, Phoenix Mercury 76
Pts: Parker (24); Rebs: Parker (18)	Pts: Taurasi (25); Rebs: Pondexter (7)

US Airways Center, Phoenix, AZ
Attendance: 7,628

NBA TV

September 26
10:00 p.m.

Game 3

Los Angeles Sparks 74, **Phoenix Mercury** **85**
Pts: Leslie (22); Rebs: Thompson (11)	Pts: Taurasi (21); Rebs: Taurasi (7)
**Phoenix won the series 2–1**

US Airways Center, Phoenix, AZ
Attendance: 7,226

== WNBA Finals ==
=== Phoenix Mercury vs. Indiana Fever ===
ESPN2HD

September 29
9:00 p.m.

Game 1

Indiana Fever 116, **Phoenix Mercury** **120** (OT)
Pts: Douglas (30); Rebs: Hoffman (8)	Pts: Pondexter, Taylor (23); Rebs: Taurasi (9)

US Airways Center, Phoenix, AZ
Attendance: 11,617

ESPN2HD

October 1
9:00 p.m.

Game 2

**Indiana Fever** **93**, Phoenix Mercury 84
Pts: Catchings (19); Rebs: Catchings (9)	Pts: Taurasi (20); Rebs: Taurasi (7)

US Airways Center, Phoenix, AZ
Attendance: 16,758

ESPN2HD

October 4
4:00 p.m.

Game 3

Phoenix Mercury 85, **Indiana Fever** **86**
Pts: Pondexter (23); Rebs: T. Smith (10)	Pts: Hoffman (18); Rebs: Catchings (12)

Conseco Fieldhouse, Indianapolis, IN
Attendance: 18,165

ESPN2HD

October 7
7:30 p.m.

Game 4

**Phoenix Mercury** **90**, Indiana Fever 77
Pts: Pondexter (22); Rebs: Willingham (8)	Pts: Catchings (24); Rebs: Catchings (12)

Conseco Fieldhouse, Indianapolis, IN
Attendance: 18,165

ESPN2HD

October 9
9:00 p.m.

Game 5

Indiana Fever 86, **Phoenix Mercury** **94**
Pts: Sutton-Brown (22); Rebs: Catchings (9)	Pts: Taurasi (26); Rebs: Smith (8)
**Phoenix won the series 3-2**

US Airways Center, Phoenix, AZ
Attendance: 17,313

- All times Eastern
