= 2005 WNBA playoffs =

Professional women's basketball tournament

- Dates: August 30 – September 20, 2005

Final positions
- Champions: Sacramento Monarchs
- Runners-up: Connecticut Sun

Tournament statistics
- Scoring leader (s): Yolanda Griffith (Sacramento) (17.3 PPG)

Awards
- MVP: Yolanda Griffith (Sacramento)

The 2005 WNBA playoffs was the postseason for the Women's National Basketball Association's 2005 season which ended with the Western Conference champion Sacramento Monarchs defeating the Eastern Conference champion Connecticut Sun 3-1. The Monarchs won their first ever WNBA title.

== Format ==
- The top 4 teams from each conference qualify for the playoffs.
- All 4 teams are seeded by basis of their standings.

== Regular season standings ==
Eastern Conference

Eastern Conference	W	L	PCT	GB	Home	Road	Conf.
Connecticut Sun ^{x}	26	8	.765	–	14–3	12–5	13–7
Indiana Fever ^{x}	21	13	.618	5.0	14–3	7–10	14–6
New York Liberty ^{x}	18	16	.529	8.0	10–7	8–9	9–11
Detroit Shock ^{x}	16	18	.471	10.0	12–5	4–13	11–9
Washington Mystics ^{o}	16	18	.471	10.0	10–7	6–11	9–11
Charlotte Sting ^{o}	6	28	.176	20.0	5–12	1–16	4–16

Western Conference

Western Conference	W	L	PCT	GB	Home	Road	Conf.
Sacramento Monarchs ^{x}	25	9	.735	–	15–2	10–7	17–5
Seattle Storm ^{x}	20	14	.588	5.0	14–3	6–11	13–9
Houston Comets ^{x}	19	15	.559	6.0	11–6	8–9	11–11
Los Angeles Sparks ^{x}	17	17	.500	8.0	11–6	6–11	12–10
Phoenix Mercury ^{o}	16	18	.471	9.0	11–6	5–12	12–10
Minnesota Lynx ^{o}	14	20	.412	11.0	11–6	3–14	9–13
San Antonio Silver Stars ^{o}	7	27	.206	18.0	5–12	2–15	3–19

Note: Teams with an "X" clinched playoff spots.

== Bracket ==
**Conference semifinals** Best-of-3
E1	**Connecticut**	2
E4	Detroit	0
**Eastern Conference**
E2	**Indiana**	2
E3	New York	0
W1	**Sacramento**	2
W4	Los Angeles	0
**Western Conference**
W2	Seattle	1
W3	**Houston**	2

**Conference finals** Best-of-3
E1	**Connecticut**	2
E2	Indiana	0
W1	**Sacramento**	2
W3	Houston	0

**WNBA Finals**; Best-of-5
E1	Connecticut	1
W1	**Sacramento**	3

- **Bold** – Series winner
- Italic – Team with home-court advantage

== Conference semifinals ==
=== Eastern Conference ===
Connecticut defeats Detroit, 2-0

- Connecticut 73, Detroit 62
- Connecticut 75, Detroit 67

Indiana defeats New York, 2-0

- Indiana 63, New York 51
- Indiana 58, New York 50

=== Western Conference ===
Houston defeats Seattle, 2-1

- Seattle 75, Houston 67
- Houston 67, Seattle 64
- Houston 75, Seattle 58

Sacramento defeats Los Angeles, 2-0

- Sacramento 75, Los Angeles 72
- Sacramento 81, Los Angeles 63

== Conference finals ==
=== Eastern Conference Finals ===
Connecticut defeats Indiana, 2-0

- Connecticut 73, Indiana 68
- Connecticut 77, Indiana 67 (OT)

=== Western Conference Finals ===
Sacramento defeats Houston, 2-0

- Sacramento 73, Houston 69 OT
- Sacramento 74, Houston 65

== WNBA Finals ==
- Sacramento defeats Connecticut, 3-1

- Sacramento 69, Connecticut 65
- Connecticut 77, Sacramento 70 (OT)
- Sacramento 66, Connecticut 55
- Sacramento 62, Connecticut 59

== See also ==
- List of WNBA Champions
