= 2002 WNBA playoffs =

Professional women's basketball tournament

- Dates: August 15–31, 2002

Final positions
- Champions: Los Angeles Sparks (Finals Champion)
- Runners-up: Connecticut Sun

Tournament statistics
- Scoring leader (s): Tamika Whitmore (New York) (16.1 PPG)

Awards
- MVP: Lisa Leslie (Los Angeles)

The 2002 WNBA playoffs was the postseason for the Women's National Basketball Association's 2002 season which ended with the Western Conference champion and defending WNBA champion Los Angeles Sparks beating the Eastern Conference champion New York Liberty, 2–0. Lisa Leslie was named the MVP of the Finals.

== Format ==
- The top 4 teams from each conference qualify for the playoffs.
- All 4 teams are seeded by basis of their standings.

== Regular season standings ==
Eastern Conference

| Eastern Conference | W | L | PCT | Conf. | GB |
|---|---|---|---|---|---|
| New York Liberty ^{x} | 18 | 14 | .563 | 11–10 | – |
| Charlotte Sting ^{x} | 18 | 14 | .563 | 12–9 | – |
| Washington Mystics ^{x} | 17 | 15 | .531 | 12–9 | 1.0 |
| Indiana Fever ^{x} | 16 | 16 | .500 | 12–9 | 2.0 |
| Orlando Miracle ^{o} | 16 | 16 | .500 | 13–8 | 2.0 |
| Miami Sol ^{o} | 15 | 17 | .469 | 11–10 | 3.0 |
| Cleveland Rockers ^{o} | 10 | 22 | .312 | 7–14 | 8.0 |
| Detroit Shock ^{o} | 9 | 23 | .281 | 6–15 | 9.0 |

Western Conference

| Western Conference | W | L | PCT | Conf. | GB |
|---|---|---|---|---|---|
| Los Angeles Sparks ^{x} | 25 | 7 | .781 | 17–4 | – |
| Houston Comets ^{x} | 24 | 8 | .750 | 16–5 | 1.0 |
| Utah Starzz ^{x} | 20 | 12 | .625 | 12–9 | 5.0 |
| Seattle Storm ^{x} | 17 | 15 | .531 | 10–11 | 8.0 |
| Portland Fire ^{o} | 16 | 16 | .500 | 8–13 | 9.0 |
| Sacramento Monarchs ^{o} | 14 | 18 | .438 | 8–13 | 11.0 |
| Phoenix Mercury ^{o} | 11 | 21 | .344 | 7–14 | 14.0 |
| Minnesota Lynx ^{o} | 10 | 22 | .313 | 6–15 | 15.0 |

Note: Teams with an "X" clinched playoff spots.

== Bracket ==
**Conference semifinals** Best-of-3
E1 | **New York** | **2**
E4 | Indiana | 1
**Eastern Conference**
E2 | Charlotte | 0
E3 | **Washington** | **2**
W1 | **Los Angeles** | **2**
W4 | Seattle | 0
**Western Conference**
W2 | Houston | 1
W3 | **Utah** | **2**

**Conference finals** Best-of-3
E1 | **New York** | **2**
E3 | Washington | 1
W1 | **Los Angeles** | **2**
W3 | Utah | 0

**WNBA Finals**; Best-of-3
E1 | New York | 0
W1 | **Los Angeles** | **2**

- **Bold** – Series winner
- Italics – Team with home-court advantage

== Conference semifinals ==
- New York defeats Indiana, 2–1

- Indiana 73, New York 55 (Aug. 16)
- New York 84, Indiana 65 (Aug. 18)
- New York 75, Indiana 60 (Aug. 20)

- Washington defeats Charlotte, 2–0

- Washington 74, Charlotte 62 (Aug. 15)
- Washington 62, Charlotte 59 (Aug. 17)

- Los Angeles defeats Seattle, 2–0

- Los Angeles 78, Seattle 61 (Aug. 15)
- Los Angeles 69, Seattle 59 (Aug. 17)

- Utah defeats Houston, 2–1

- Utah 66, Houston 59 (Aug. 16)
- Houston 83, Utah 77 (2OT) (Aug. 18)
- Utah 75, Houston 72 (Aug. 20)

== Conference finals ==
- New York defeats Washington, 2–1

- Washington 79, New York 74 (Aug. 22)
- New York 96, Washington 79 (Aug. 24)
- New York 64, Washington 57 (Aug. 25)

- Los Angeles defeats Utah, 2–0

- Los Angeles 75, Utah 67 (Aug. 22)
- Los Angeles 103, Utah 77 (Aug. 24)

== WNBA Finals ==
- Los Angeles defeats New York, 2–0

- L.A. 71, New York 63 (Aug. 29)
- L.A. 69, New York 66 (Aug. 31)

== See also ==
- List of WNBA Champions
