= 2003 WNBA playoffs =

Professional women's basketball tournament

- Dates: August 28 – September 16, 2003

Final positions
- Champions: Detroit Shock
- Runners-up: Los Angeles Sparks

Tournament statistics
- Scoring leader (s): Lisa Leslie (Los Angeles) (20.8 PPG)

Awards
- MVP: Ruth Riley (Detroit)

The 2003 WNBA playoffs was the postseason for the Women's National Basketball Association's 2003 season which ended with the Eastern Conference champion Detroit Shock beating the Western Conference champion and two-time defending WNBA champion Los Angeles Sparks, 2-1. Ruth Riley was named the MVP of the Finals.

== Format ==
- The top 4 teams from each conference qualify for the playoffs.
- All 4 teams are seeded by basis of their standings.

== Regular season standings ==
Eastern Conference

Eastern Conference	W	L	PCT	GB	Home	Road	Conf.
Detroit Shock ^{x}	25	9	.735	–	13–4	12–5	18–6
Charlotte Sting ^{x}	18	16	.529	7.0	13–4	5–12	12–12
Connecticut Sun ^{x}	18	16	.529	7.0	10–7	8–9	11–13
Cleveland Rockers ^{x}	17	17	.500	8.0	11–6	6–11	13–11
Indiana Fever ^{o}	16	18	.471	9.0	11–6	5–12	12–12
New York Liberty ^{o}	16	18	.471	9.0	11–6	5–12	11–13
Washington Mystics ^{o}	9	25	.265	16.0	3–14	6–11	7–17

Western Conference

Western Conference	W	L	PCT	GB	Home	Road	Conf.
Los Angeles Sparks ^{x}	24	10	.706	–	11–6	13–4	17–7
Houston Comets ^{x}	20	14	.588	4.0	14–3	6–11	14–10
Sacramento Monarchs ^{x}	19	15	.559	5.0	12–5	7–10	13–11
Minnesota Lynx ^{x}	18	16	.529	6.0	11–6	7–10	14–10
Seattle Storm ^{o}	18	16	.529	6.0	13–4	5–12	11–13
San Antonio Silver Stars ^{o}	12	22	.353	12.0	9–8	3–14	10–14
Phoenix Mercury ^{o}	8	26	.235	16.0	6–11	2–15	5–19

Note: Teams with an "X" clinched playoff spots.

== Bracket ==
**Conference semifinals** **Best-of-3**
E1	**Detroit**	2
E4	Cleveland	1
**Eastern Conference**
E2	Charlotte	0
E3	**Connecticut**	2
W1	**Los Angeles**	2
W4	Minnesota	1
**Western Conference**
W2	Houston	1
W3	**Sacramento**	2

**Conference finals** Best-of-3
E1	**Detroit**	2
E3	Connecticut	0
W1	**Los Angeles**	2
W3	Sacramento	1

**WNBA Finals**; Best-of-3
E1	**Detroit**	2
W1	Los Angeles	1

- **Bold** – Series winner
- Italic – Team with home-court advantage

== First round ==
- Detroit defeats Cleveland, 2-1

- Detroit 76, Cleveland 74 (Aug. 29)
- Cleveland 66, Detroit 59 (Aug. 31)
- Detroit 77, Cleveland 63 (Sept. 2)

- Connecticut defeats Charlotte, 2-0

- Connecticut 68, Charlotte 66 (Aug. 28)
- Connecticut 68, Charlotte 62 (Aug. 30)

- Los Angeles defeats Minnesota, 2-1

- Minnesota 74, Los Angeles 72 (Aug. 28)
- Los Angeles 80, Minnesota 69 (Aug. 30)
- Los Angeles 74, Minnesota 64 (Sept. 1)

- Sacramento defeats Houston, 2-1

- Sacramento 65, Houston 59 (Aug. 29)
- Houston 69, Sacramento 48 (Aug. 31)
- Sacramento 70, Houston 68 (Sept. 2)

== Conference finals ==
- Detroit defeats Connecticut, 2-0

- Detroit 73, Connecticut 63 (Sept. 5)
- Detroit 79, Connecticut 73 (Sept. 7)

- Los Angeles defeats Sacramento, 2-1

- Sacramento 77, Los Angeles 69 (Sept. 5)
- Los Angeles 79, Sacramento 54 (Sept. 7)
- Los Angeles 66, Sacramento 63 (Sept. 8)

== WNBA Finals ==
- Detroit defeats Los Angeles, 2-1

- L.A. 75, Detroit 63 (Sept. 12)
- Detroit 62, L.A. 61 (Sept. 14)
- Detroit 83, L.A. 78 (Sept. 16)

== See also ==
- List of WNBA Champions
