= 2006 WNBA playoffs =

Professional women's basketball tournament

- Dates: August 17 – September 9, 2006

Final positions
- Champions: Detroit Shock
- Runners-up: Sacramento Monarchs

Tournament statistics
- Scoring leader (s): Deanna Nolan (Detroit) (17.8 PPG)

Awards
- MVP: Deanna Nolan (Detroit)

The 2006 WNBA playoffs was the postseason for the Women's National Basketball Association's 2006 season which ended with the Eastern Conference champion Detroit Shock defeating the Western Conference champion Sacramento Monarchs 3-2.

== Format ==
- The top 4 teams from each conference qualify for the playoffs.
  - All 4 teams are seeded by basis of their standings.
- The series for rounds one and two are in a best-of-three format with Games 2 and 3 on the home court of the team with the higher seed.
- The series for the WNBA Finals is in a best-of-five format with Games 1, 2 and 5 on the home court of the team with the higher seed.
- Reseeding (as used in the Stanley Cup Playoffs) is not in use: therefore, all playoff matchups are predetermined via the teams' seedings.

== Playoff qualifying ==
=== Eastern Conference ===
The following teams clinched a playoff berth in the East:

1. Connecticut Sun (26–8)
2. Detroit Shock (23–11)
3. Indiana Fever (21–13)
4. Washington Mystics (18–16)

=== Western Conference ===
The following teams clinched a playoff berth in the West:

1. Los Angeles Sparks (25–9)
2. Sacramento Monarchs (21–13)
3. Houston Comets (18–16)
4. Seattle Storm (18–16)

== Bracket ==
This was the outlook for the 2006 WNBA Playoffs. Teams in italics had home court advantage. Teams in bold advanced to the next round. Numbers to the left of each team indicate the team's original playoffs seeding in their respective conferences. Numbers to the right of each team indicate the number of games the team won in that round.

**Conference semifinals** Best-of-3
E1	**Connecticut**	2
E4	Washington	0
E2	**Detroit**	2
E3	Indiana	0
W1	**Los Angeles**	2
W4	Seattle	1
W2	**Sacramento**	2
W3	Houston	0

**Conference finals** Best-of-3
E1	Connecticut	1
E2	**Detroit**	2
W1	Los Angeles	0
W2	**Sacramento**	2

**WNBA Finals**; Best-of-5
E2	**Detroit**	3
W2	Sacramento	2

- **Bold** – series winner
- Italic – team with home court advantage

== Eastern Conference ==
=== First round ===
==== (1) Connecticut Sun vs. (4) Washington Mystics ====
August 18

Game 1

**Connecticut Sun** **76**, Washington Mystics 61

Verizon Center, Washington, D.C.

August 20

Game 2

Washington Mystics 65, **Connecticut Sun** **68**
**Connecticut wins series, 2–0**

Mohegan Sun Arena, Uncasville

==== (2) Detroit Shock vs. (3) Indiana Fever ====
August 17

Game 1

**Detroit Shock** **68**, Indiana Fever 56

Conseco Fieldhouse, Indianapolis

August 19

Game 2

Indiana Fever 83, **Detroit Shock** **98**
**Detroit wins series, 2–0**

The Palace of Auburn Hills, Auburn Hills

=== Conference finals ===
==== (1) Connecticut Sun vs. (2) Detroit Shock ====
August 24

Game 1

Connecticut Sun 59, **Detroit Shock** **70**

The Palace of Auburn Hills, Auburn Hills

August 26

Game 2

Detroit Shock 68, **Connecticut Sun** **77**

Mohegan Sun Arena, Uncasville

August 27

Game 3

**Detroit Shock** **79**, Connecticut Sun 55
**Detroit wins series, 2–1**

Mohegan Sun Arena, Uncasville

== Western Conference ==
=== First round ===
==== (1) Los Angeles Sparks vs. (4) Seattle Storm ====
August 18

Game 1

Los Angeles Sparks 72, **Seattle Storm** **84**

KeyArena, Seattle

August 20

Game 2

Seattle Storm 70, **Los Angeles Sparks** **78**

Staples Center, Los Angeles

August 22

Game 3

Seattle Storm 63, **Los Angeles Sparks** **68**
**Los Angeles wins series, 2–1**

Staples Center, Los Angeles

==== (2) Sacramento Monarchs vs. (3) Houston Comets ====
August 17

Game 1

**Sacramento Monarchs** **93**, Houston Comets 78

Toyota Center, Houston

August 19

Game 2

Houston Comets 64, **Sacramento Monarchs** **92**
**Sacramento wins series, 2–0**

ARCO Arena, Sacramento

=== Conference finals ===
==== (1) Los Angeles Sparks vs. (2) Sacramento Monarchs ====
August 24

Game 1

Los Angeles Sparks 61, **Sacramento Monarchs** **64**

ARCO Arena, Sacramento

August 26

Game 2

**Sacramento Monarchs** **72**, Los Angeles Sparks 58
**Sacramento wins series, 2–0**

Staples Center, Los Angeles

== WNBA Finals ==
=== Sacramento Monarchs vs. Detroit Shock ===
August 30

Game 1

**Sacramento Monarchs** **95**, Detroit Shock 71

The Palace of Auburn Hills, Auburn Hills

September 1

Game 2

Sacramento Monarchs 63, **Detroit Shock** **73**

The Palace of Auburn Hills, Auburn Hills

September 3

Game 3

Detroit Shock 69, **Sacramento Monarchs** **89**

ARCO Arena, Sacramento

September 6

Game 4

**Detroit Shock** **72**, Sacramento Monarchs 52

ARCO Arena, Sacramento

September 9

Game 5

Sacramento Monarchs 75, **Detroit Shock** **80**
**Detroit wins series, 3–2**

The Palace of Auburn Hills, Auburn Hills
