= Eastern Conference (WNBA) =

Conference of the Women's National Basketball Association

- League: WNBA
- Sport: Basketball
- First season: 1997
- No. of teams: 6
- Most recent champion: Atlanta Dream (2026)
- Most titles: Detroit Shock (4)

The Eastern Conference is one of two conferences that make up the Women's National Basketball Association (WNBA), the other being the Western Conference. The Eastern Conference consists of 6 teams, whereas with the addition of Portland Fire and Toronto Tempo in the 2026 season, the Western Conference consists of 9 teams.

From the league's second season in 1998 through 2015, the WNBA operated separate playoff brackets for its Eastern and Western Conferences. Each conference's playoff was divided into two playoff rounds, the Conference Semi-Finals and the Conference Finals, with the Conference Finals winners receiving Conference Championships and advancing to the WNBA Finals to determine the WNBA champion. In the final years of this playoff scheme, all in-conference playoff series were best-of-three.

In the current system, the eight best teams by the regular-season record, without regard to conference alignment, qualify for the playoffs. Since 2022, the playoffs have been held in a standard knockout format, with the first round consisting of best-of-three series and the semifinals and finals being best-of-five. The higher seed will generally face a weaker team, and will have home-court advantage in each round. In 2024, all quarterfinal series used a 2–1 home-court pattern, which allowed the higher seed the opportunity to win the series without having to visit the lower seed. This in turn meant that a lower seed that won one of the first two games would host the series decider. However, the quarterfinals will return to a 1–1–1 pattern in 2025, with the higher seed hosting the first game and a potential third game.

The quarterfinals are bracketed in the normal manner for an 8-team tournament, with 1 vs. 8 and 4 vs. 5 on one side of the bracket and 2 vs. 7 and 3 vs. 6 on the other. The winners of each quarterfinal series advance to the semifinals, with the bracket not being reseeded. The semifinals use a 2–2–1 home-court pattern, meaning that the higher-seeded team will have home court in games 1, 2, and 5 while the other team plays at home in game 3 and 4. Through 2024, the finals were also played in a 2–2–1 home-court pattern. Starting in 2025, the finals will use the same 2–2–1–1–1 pattern currently used by the NBA.

== Teams ==
Team	City/Area	Arena	Colors	Joined WNBA	Head coach
Atlanta Dream	College Park, Georgia	Gateway Center Arena	Sky blue, red, white	2008	Karl Smesko
Chicago Sky	Chicago, Illinois	Wintrust Arena	Sky blue, yellow, white	2006	Tyler Marsh
Indiana Fever	Indianapolis, Indiana	Gainbridge Fieldhouse	Navy blue, gold, red, white	2000	Stephanie White
New York Liberty	Brooklyn, New York	Barclays Center	Black, green, orange, white	1997	Chris DeMarco
Toronto Tempo	Toronto, Ontario	Coca-Cola Coliseum	Borealis blue and tempo bordeaux	2026	Sandy Brondello
Washington Mystics	Washington, D.C.	CareFirst Arena	Navy, gray, white, red	1998	Sydney Johnson

=== Former teams ===
Defunct

- Charlotte Sting (1997–2006)
- Cleveland Rockers (1997–2003)
- Miami Sol (2000–2002)

Changed to Western Conference

- Houston Comets

Relocated

- Orlando Miracle to Connecticut Sun (2003)
- Detroit Shock to Tulsa Shock (West) (2009); team now plays in the West as the Dallas Wings (2016)
- Connecticut Sun to Houston Comets (2026); now plays in the West

== Eastern Conference champions ==
The WNBA awarded conference championships between 1998 and 2015 to the winners of the Conference Finals in the playoffs. Conference championships were not awarded in the 1997 inaugural season, and they were again discontinued since the WNBA adopted its current single-table playoff format in 2016.

WNBA champions in bold

- 1998: Cleveland Rockers
- 1999: New York Liberty
- 2000: New York Liberty (2)
- 2001: Charlotte Sting
- 2002: New York Liberty (3)
- 2003: **Detroit Shock**
- 2004: Connecticut Sun
- 2005: Connecticut Sun (2)
- 2006: **Detroit Shock** (2)
- 2007: Detroit Shock (3)
- 2008: **Detroit Shock** (4)
- 2009: Indiana Fever
- 2010: Atlanta Dream
- 2011: Atlanta Dream (2)
- 2012: **Indiana Fever** (2)
- 2013: Atlanta Dream (3)
- 2014: Chicago Sky
- 2015: Indiana Fever (3)

== All-time regular-season conference standings ==
=== 2026 season ===
#	Team	W	L	PCT	GB	Conf.	Home	Road	Cup
1	**y** — Minnesota Lynx	33	11	.750	–	20–3	15–7	18–4	6–1
2	**x** — Golden State Valkyries	32	12	.727	1	15–8	17–5	15–7	5–2
3	**x** — Las Vegas Aces	31	13	.705	2	17–6	15–7	16–6	6–1
4	**x** — Atlanta Dream	30	14	.682	3	15–5	15–7	15–7	4–2
5	**x** — Washington Mystics	28	16	.636	5	15–5	15–7	13–9	3–3
6	**x** — Indiana Fever	28	16	.636	5	14–6	15–7	13–9	5–1
7	**x** — Dallas Wings	27	17	.614	6	13–10	16–6	11–11	4–3
8	**cx** – New York Liberty	26	18	.591	7	13–7	14–8	12–10	6–0
9	**e** — Portland Fire	17	27	.386	16	7–16	9–13	8–14	2–5
10	**e** — Phoenix Mercury	16	28	.364	17	10–13	7–15	9–13	2–5
11	**e** — Chicago Sky	16	28	.364	17	4–16	11–11	5–17	1–5
12	**e** — Los Angeles Sparks	16	28	.364	17	9–14	8–14	8–14	3–4
13	**e** — Toronto Tempo	11	33	.250	22	5–15	7–15	4–18	2–4
14	**e** — Connecticut Sun	11	33	.250	22	4–16	8–14	3–19	0–6
15	**e** — Seattle Storm	8	36	.182	25	1–22	6–16	2–20	0–7

Notes

(#) – League Standing
c – Commissioner's Cup winner
y – Regular season champion
x – Clinched playoff berth
e – Eliminated from playoff contention
Source: Overall standings and Commissioner's Cup Standings

=== 2025 season ===
#	Team	W	L	PCT	GB	Conf.	Home	Road	Cup
1	**yx** – Minnesota Lynx	34	10	.773	–	20–4	20–2	14–8	5–1
2	**x** – Las Vegas Aces	30	14	.682	4	16–8	17–5	13–9	2–4
3	**x** – Atlanta Dream	30	14	.682	4	15–6	16–6	14–8	3–2
4	**x** – Phoenix Mercury	27	17	.614	7	13–11	15–7	12–10	4–2
5	**x** – New York Liberty	27	17	.614	7	15–5	17–5	10–12	4–1
6	**cx** – Indiana Fever	24	20	.545	10	13–8	13–9	11–11	4–1
7	**x** – Seattle Storm	23	21	.523	11	12–12	10–12	13–9	4–2
8	**x** – Golden State Valkyries	23	21	.523	11	9–15	14–8	9–13	3–3
9	**e** – Los Angeles Sparks	21	23	.477	13	10–14	9–13	12–10	2–4
10	**e** – Washington Mystics	16	28	.364	18	8–12	10–12	6–16	2–3
11	**e** – Connecticut Sun	11	33	.250	23	7–14	7–15	4–18	1–4
12	**e** – Chicago Sky	10	34	.227	24	4–17	6–16	4–18	1–4
13	**e** – Dallas Wings	10	34	.227	24	4–20	6–16	4–18	1–5

Notes

(#) – League Standing
c – Commissioner's Cup winners
y – Regular Season Champion
x – Clinched playoff berth
e – Eliminated from playoff contention
Source: Overall standings and Commissioner's Cup Standings

=== 2024 season ===
#	Team	W	L	PCT	GB	Conf.	Home	Road	Cup
1	**yx** – New York Liberty	32	8	.800	—	16–4	16–4	16–4	5–0
2	**cx** – Minnesota Lynx	30	10	.750	2	14–6	16–4	14–6	4–1
3	**x** – Connecticut Sun	28	12	.700	4	14–6	14–6	14–6	4–1
4	**x** – Las Vegas Aces	27	13	.675	5	12–8	13–7	14–6	2–3
5	**x** – Seattle Storm	25	15	.625	7	13–7	14–6	11–9	4–1
6	**x** – Indiana Fever	20	20	.500	12	11–9	12–8	8–12	3–2
7	**x** – Phoenix Mercury	19	21	.475	13	10–10	10–10	9–11	3–2
8	**x** – Atlanta Dream	15	25	.375	17	7–13	8–12	7–13	1–4
9	**e** – Washington Mystics	14	26	.350	18	7–13	5–15	9–11	1–4
10	**e** – Chicago Sky	13	27	.325	19	5–15	6–14	7–13	1–4
11	**e** – Dallas Wings	9	31	.225	23	6–14	7–13	2–18	0–5
12	**e** – Los Angeles Sparks	8	32	.200	24	5–15	5–15	3–17	2–3

Notes

(#) – League Standing
c – Commissioner's Cup winners
y – Regular Season Champion
x – Clinched playoff berth
e – Eliminated from playoff contention
Source: Overall standings and Commissioner's Cup Standings

=== 2023 season ===
#	Team	W	L	PCT	GB	Conf.	Home	Road	Cup
1	**x** – Las Vegas Aces	34	6	.850	–	18–2	19–1	15–5	9–1
2	**x** – New York Liberty	32	8	.800	2	16–4	15–5	17–3	7–3
3	**x** – Connecticut Sun	27	13	.675	7	14–6	13–7	14–6	7–3
4	**x** – Dallas Wings	22	18	.550	12	11–9	11–9	11–9	6–4
5	**x** – Atlanta Dream	19	21	.475	15	11–9	11–9	8–12	6–4
6	**x** – Minnesota Lynx	19	21	.475	15	12–8	9–11	10–10	5–5
7	**x** – Washington Mystics	19	21	.475	15	9–11	12–8	7–13	5–5
8	**x** – Chicago Sky	18	22	.450	16	5–15	7–13	11–9	3–7
9	**e** – Los Angeles Sparks	17	23	.425	17	9–11	10–10	7–13	5–5
10	**e** – Indiana Fever	13	27	.325	21	5–15	6–14	7–13	2–8
11	**e** – Seattle Storm	11	29	.275	23	8–12	4–16	7–13	4–6
12	**e** – Phoenix Mercury	9	31	.225	25	2–18	8–12	1–19	1–9

Notes

(#) – League Standing
x – Clinched playoff berth
e – Eliminated from postseason contention
Source: Overall standings and Commissioner's Cup Standings

=== 2022 season ===
#	Team	W	L	PCT	GB	Conf.	Home	Road	Cup
1	**x** – Las Vegas Aces	26	10	.722	–	15–3	13–5	13–5	9–1
2	**x** – Chicago Sky	26	10	.722	–	15–3	14–4	12–6	9–1
3	**x** – Connecticut Sun	25	11	.694	1.0	11–7	13–5	12–6	5–5
4	**x** – Seattle Storm	22	14	.611	4.0	10–8	13–5	9–9	6–4
5	**x** – Washington Mystics	22	14	.611	4.0	11–7	12–6	10–8	5–5
6	**x** – Dallas Wings	18	18	.500	8.0	8–10	8–10	10–8	5–5
7	**x** – New York Liberty	16	20	.444	10.0	10–8	9–9	7–11	6–4
8	**x** – Phoenix Mercury	15	21	.417	11.0	7–11	11–7	4–14	3–7
9	**e** – Minnesota Lynx	14	22	.389	12.0	8–10	7–11	7–11	4–6
10	**e** – Atlanta Dream	14	22	.389	12.0	5–13	8–10	6–12	3–7
11	**e** – Los Angeles Sparks	13	23	.361	13.0	6–12	7–11	6–12	3–7
12	**e** – Indiana Fever	5	31	.139	21.0	2–16	3–15	2–16	2–8

Notes

(#) – League Standing
x – Clinched playoff berth
e – Eliminated from playoff contention
Source: Overall standings and Commissioner's Cup Standings

=== 2021 season ===
#	Team	W	L	PCT	GB	Conf.	Home	Road	Cup
1	**x** – Connecticut Sun	26	6	.813	–	12–3	15–1	11–5	9–1
2	**x** – Las Vegas Aces	24	8	.750	2	11–4	13–3	11–5	6–4
3	**x** – Minnesota Lynx	22	10	.688	4	10–5	13–3	9–7	7–3
4	**x** – Seattle Storm	21	11	.656	5	9–6	11–5	10–6	8–2
5	**x** – Phoenix Mercury	19	13	.594	7	6–9	7–9	12–4	5–5
6	**x** – Chicago Sky	16	16	.500	10	10–5	6–10	10–6	6–4
7	**x** – Dallas Wings	14	18	.438	12	7–8	7–9	7–9	3–7
8	**x** – New York Liberty	12	20	.375	14	6–9	7–9	5–11	5–5
9	**e** – Washington Mystics	12	20	.375	14	7–8	8–8	4–12	4–6
10	**e** – Los Angeles Sparks	12	20	.375	14	2–13	8–8	4–12	1–9
11	**e** – Atlanta Dream	8	24	.250	18	6–9	4–12	4–12	4–6
12	**e** – Indiana Fever	6	26	.188	20	4–11	4–12	2–14	2–8

Notes

(#) – League Standing
x – Clinched playoff berth
e – Eliminated from playoff contention
Source: Overall standings and Commissioner's Cup Standings

=== 2020 season ===
#	Team	W	L	PCT	GB	Conf.
1	**x** – Las Vegas Aces	18	4	.818	–	8–2
2	**x** – Seattle Storm	18	4	.818	–	8–2
3	**x** – Los Angeles Sparks	15	7	.682	3	5–5
4	**x** – Minnesota Lynx	14	8	.636	4	4–6
5	**x** – Phoenix Mercury	13	9	.591	5	4–6
6	**x** – Chicago Sky	12	10	.545	6	6–4
7	**x** – Connecticut Sun	10	12	.455	8	7–3
8	**x** – Washington Mystics	9	13	.409	9	6–4
9	**e** – Dallas Wings	8	14	.364	10	1–9
10	**e** – Atlanta Dream	7	15	.318	11	5–5
11	**e** – Indiana Fever	6	16	.273	12	4–6
12	**e** – New York Liberty	2	20	.091	16	2–8

Notes

x – Clinched playoff berth
e – Eliminated from playoffs
Home and Away records not shown, as all games played at a neutral location.
Updated to include results from September 13, 2020

=== 2019 season ===
#	Eastern Conference	W	L	PCT	GB	Home	Road	Conf.
1	Washington Mystics **(1)**	26	8	.765	–	14–3	12–5	13–3
2	Connecticut Sun **(2)**	23	11	.676	3	15–2	8–9	11–5
3	Chicago Sky **(5)**	20	14	.588	6	12–5	8–9	11–5
4	**e** –Indiana Fever	13	21	.382	13	7–10	6–11	7–9
5	**e** –New York Liberty	10	24	.294	16	4–13	6–11	3–13
6	**e** –Atlanta Dream	8	26	.235	18	5–12	3–14	3–13

Notes

(#) – Conference Standing, Playoff Seeds shown to the right of team name
e – Eliminated from playoffs

=== 2018 season ===
#	Eastern Conference	W	L	PCT	GB	Home	Road	Conf.
1	Atlanta Dream **(2)**	23	11	.676	–	13–4	10–7	12–4
2	Washington Mystics **(3)**	22	12	.647	1	12–5	10–7	12–4
3	Connecticut Sun **(4)**	21	13	.618	2	13–4	8–9	9–7
4	**e** – Chicago Sky	13	21	.382	10	7–10	6–11	6–10
5	**e** – New York Liberty	7	27	.206	16	4–13	3–14	6–10
6	**e** – Indiana Fever	6	28	.176	17	2–15	4–13	3–13

Notes

(#) – Conference Standing, Playoff Seeds shown to the right of team name
x – Clinched Playoff Berth
e – Eliminated from playoffs

=== 2017 season ===
#	Eastern Conference	W	L	PCT	GB	Home	Road	Conf.
1	New York Liberty - **(3)**	22	12	.647	-	13–4	9–8	10–6
2	Connecticut Sun - **(4)**	21	13	.636	1	12–5	9–6	10–6
3	Washington Mystics - **(6)**	18	16	.529	4	11–6	7–10	12-4
4	Chicago Sky - **e**	12	22	.353	10	4–13	8–9	6–10
5	Atlanta Dream - **e**	12	22	.353	10	9–8	3–14	5–11
6	Indiana Fever - **e**	9	25	.265	13	6–11	3–14	4–12

Notes

(#) – Conference Standing
Playoff Seeds shown next to team name
e – Eliminated from playoffs

=== 2016 season ===
Eastern Conference	W	L	PCT	GB	Home	Road	Conf.
**3** - New York Liberty	21	13	.618	—	10–7	11–6	11–5
**4** - Chicago Sky	18	16	.529	3	11–6	7–10	8–8
**5** - Indiana Fever	17	17	.500	4	8–9	9–8	8–8
**6** - Atlanta Dream	17	17	.500	4	11–6	6–11	9–7
**e** - Connecticut Sun	14	20	.412	7	8–9	6–11	4–12
**e** - Washington Mystics	13	21	.382	8	5–12	8–9	8–8

Notes

# – Playoff seed
e – Eliminated from playoffs

=== 2015 season ===
Eastern Conference	W	L	PCT	GB	Home	Road	Conf.
**x** - New York Liberty	23	11	.676	–	12–5	11–6	13–9
**x** - Chicago Sky	21	13	.618	2	13–4	8–9	14–8
**x** - Indiana Fever	20	14	.588	3	11–6	9–8	13–9
**x** - Washington Mystics	18	16	.529	5	11–6	7–10	10–12
**e** - Atlanta Dream	15	19	.441	8	9–8	6–11	10–12
**e** - Connecticut Sun	15	19	.441	8	8–9	7–10	6–16

Notes

x – Clinched playoff spot
e – Eliminated from playoffs

=== 2014 season ===
#	Eastern Conference					
#	Team	W	L	PCT	GB	GP
1	y- Atlanta Dream	19	15	.559	-	34
2	x- Indiana Fever	16	18	.471	3.0	34
3	x-Washington Mystics	16	18	.471	3.0	34
4	x-Chicago Sky	15	19	.441	4.0	34
5	e-New York Liberty	15	19	.441	4.0	34
6	e-Connecticut Sun	13	21	.382	6.0	34

=== 2013 season ===
#	Eastern Conference					
#	Team	W	L	PCT	GB	GP
1	**z**-Chicago Sky	24	10	.706	-	34
2	**x**-Atlanta Dream	17	17	.500	7	34
3	**x**-Washington Mystics	17	17	.500	7	34
4	**x**-Indiana Fever	16	18	.471	8	34
5	**e**-New York Liberty	11	23	.324	13	34
6	**e**-Connecticut Sun	10	24	.294	14	34

=== 2012 season ===
Eastern Conference	W	L	PCT	GB	Home	Road	Conf.
Connecticut Sun ^{y}	25	9	.735	–	12–5	13–4	18–4
Indiana Fever ^{x}	22	12	.647	3.0	13–4	9–8	15–7
Atlanta Dream ^{x}	19	15	.559	6.0	11–6	8–9	12–10
New York Liberty ^{x}	15	19	.441	10.0	9–8	6–11	10–12
Chicago Sky ^{o}	14	20	.412	11.0	7–10	7–10	8–14
Washington Mystics ^{o}	5	29	.147	20.0	4–13	1–16	3–19

=== 2011 season ===
Eastern Conference	W	L	PCT	GB	Home	Road	Conf.
Indiana Fever ^{x}	21	13	.618	–	13–4	8–9	13–9
Connecticut Sun ^{x}	21	13	.618	–	15–2	6–11	14–8
Atlanta Dream ^{x}	20	14	.588	1.0	11–6	9–8	14–8
New York Liberty ^{x}	19	15	.559	2.0	12-5	7–10	11–11
Chicago Sky ^{o}	14	20	.412	7.0	10–7	4–13	10–12
Washington Mystics ^{o}	6	28	.176	15.0	4–13	2–15	4–18

=== 2010 season ===
Eastern Conference	W	L	PCT	GB	Home	Road	Conf.
Washington Mystics ^{x}	22	12	.647	–	13–4	9–8	13–9
New York Liberty ^{x}	22	12	.647	–	13–4	9–8	14–8
Indiana Fever ^{x}	21	13	.618	1.0	13–4	8–9	13–9
Atlanta Dream ^{x}	19	15	.559	3.0	10–7	9–8	10–12
Connecticut Sun ^{o}	17	17	.500	5.0	12–5	5–12	9–13
Chicago Sky ^{o}	14	20	.412	8.0	7–10	7–10	7–15

=== 2009 season ===
Eastern Conference	W	L	PCT	GB	Home	Road	Conf.
Indiana Fever ^{x}	22	12	.647	–	14–3	8–9	17–5
Atlanta Dream ^{x}	18	16	.529	4.0	12–5	6–11	10–12
Detroit Shock ^{x}	18	16	.529	4.0	11–6	7–10	11–11
Washington Mystics ^{x}	16	18	.471	6.0	11–6	5–12	10–12
Chicago Sky ^{o}	16	18	.471	6.0	12–5	4–13	10–12
Connecticut Sun ^{o}	16	18	.471	6.0	12–5	4–13	9–12
New York Liberty ^{o}	13	21	.382	9.0	8–9	5–12	8–13

=== 2008 season ===
Eastern Conference	W	L	PCT	GB	Home	Road	Conf.
Detroit Shock ^{x}	22	12	.647	–	14–3	8–9	16–4
Connecticut Sun ^{x}	21	13	.618	1.0	13–4	8–9	13–7
New York Liberty ^{x}	19	15	.559	3.0	11–6	8–9	11–9
Indiana Fever ^{x}	17	17	.500	5.0	11–6	6–11	12–8
Chicago Sky ^{o}	12	22	.353	10.0	8–9	4–13	10–10
Washington Mystics ^{o}	10	24	.294	12.0	6–11	4–13	6–14
Atlanta Dream ^{o}	4	30	.118	18.0	1–16	3–14	2–18

=== 2007 season ===
Eastern Conference	W	L	PCT	GB	Home	Road	Conf.
Detroit Shock ^{x}	24	10	.706	–	12–5	12–5	14–6
Indiana Fever ^{x}	21	13	.618	3.0	12–5	9–8	12–8
Connecticut Sun ^{x}	18	16	.529	6.0	8–9	10–7	10–10
New York Liberty ^{x}	16	18	.471	8.0	10–7	6–11	10–10
Washington Mystics ^{o}	16	18	.471	8.0	8–9	8–9	8–12
Chicago Sky ^{o}	14	20	.412	10.0	6–11	8–9	6–14

=== 2006 season ===
Eastern Conference	W	L	PCT	GB	Home	Road	Conf.
**z** - Connecticut Sun	26	8	.765	–	14–3	12–5	15–5
**x** - Detroit Shock	23	11	.676	3.0	14–3	9–8	14–6
**x** - Indiana Fever	21	13	.618	5.0	12–5	9–8	12–8
**x** - Washington Mystics	18	16	.529	8.0	13–4	5–12	12–8
**e** - New York Liberty	11	23	.324	15.0	7–10	4–13	7–13
**e** - Charlotte Sting	11	23	.324	15.0	7–10	4–3	6–14
**e** - Chicago Sky	5	29	.147	21.0	3–14	2–15	4–16

=== 2005 season ===
Eastern Conference	W	L	PCT	GB	Home	Road	Conf.
Connecticut Sun ^{x}	26	8	.765	–	14–3	12–5	13–7
Indiana Fever ^{x}	21	13	.618	5.0	14–3	7–10	14–6
New York Liberty ^{x}	18	16	.529	8.0	10–7	8–9	9–11
Detroit Shock ^{x}	16	18	.471	10.0	12–5	4–13	11–9
Washington Mystics ^{o}	16	18	.471	10.0	10–7	6–11	9–11
Charlotte Sting ^{o}	6	28	.176	20.0	5–12	1–16	4–16

=== 2004 season ===
Eastern Conference	W	L	PCT	GB	Home	Road	Conf.
Connecticut Sun ^{x}	18	16	.529	–	10–7	8–9	14–6
New York Liberty ^{x}	18	16	.529	–	11–6	7–10	10–10
Detroit Shock ^{x}	17	17	.500	1.0	8–9	9–8	11–9
Washington Mystics ^{x}	17	17	.500	1.0	11–6	6–11	9–11
Charlotte Sting ^{o}	16	18	.471	2.0	10–7	6–11	8–12
Indiana Fever ^{o}	15	19	.441	3.0	10–7	5–12	8–12

=== 2003 season ===
Eastern Conference	W	L	PCT	GB	Home	Road	Conf.
Detroit Shock ^{x}	25	9	.735	–	13–4	12–5	18–6
Charlotte Sting ^{x}	18	16	.529	7.0	13–4	5–12	12–12
Connecticut Sun ^{x}	18	16	.529	7.0	10–7	8–9	11–13
Cleveland Rockers ^{x}	17	17	.500	8.0	11–6	6–11	13–11
Indiana Fever ^{o}	16	18	.471	9.0	11–6	5–12	12–12
New York Liberty ^{o}	16	18	.471	9.0	11–6	5–12	11–13
Washington Mystics ^{o}	9	25	.265	16.0	3–14	6–11	7–17

=== 2002 season ===
Eastern Conference	W	L	PCT	Conf.	GB
New York Liberty ^{x}	18	14	.563	11–10	–
Charlotte Sting ^{x}	18	14	.563	12–9	–
Washington Mystics ^{x}	17	15	.531	12–9	1.0
Indiana Fever ^{x}	16	16	.500	12–9	2.0
Orlando Miracle ^{o}	16	16	.500	13–8	2.0
Miami Sol ^{o}	15	17	.469	11–10	3.0
Cleveland Rockers ^{o}	10	22	.312	7–14	8.0
Detroit Shock ^{o}	9	23	.281	6–15	9.0

=== 2001 season ===
Eastern Conference	W	L	PCT	Conf.	GB
Cleveland Rockers ^{x}	22	10	.688	15–6	–
New York Liberty ^{x}	21	11	.656	13–8	1.0
Miami Sol ^{x}	20	12	.625	14–7	2.0
Charlotte Sting ^{x}	18	14	.563	15–6	4.0
Orlando Miracle ^{o}	13	19	.406	9–12	9.0
Indiana Fever ^{o}	10	22	.313	7–14	12.0
Detroit Shock ^{o}	10	22	.313	7–14	12.0
Washington Mystics ^{o}	10	22	.313	4–17	12.0

=== 2000 season ===
Eastern Conference	W	L	PCT	Conf.	GB
New York Liberty ^{x}	20	12	.625	14–7	–
Cleveland Rockers ^{x}	17	15	.531	13–8	3.0
Orlando Miracle ^{x}	16	16	.500	13–8	4.0
Washington Mystics ^{x}	14	18	.438	13–8	6.0
Detroit Shock ^{o}	14	18	.438	10–11	6.0
Miami Sol ^{o}	13	19	.406	9–12	7.0
Indiana Fever ^{o}	9	23	.281	7–14	11.0
Charlotte Sting ^{o}	8	24	.250	5–16	12.0

=== 1999 season ===
Eastern Conference	W	L	PCT	Conf.	GB
New York Liberty ^{x}	18	14	.563	12–8	–
Detroit Shock ^{x}	15	17	.469	12–8	3.0
Charlotte Sting ^{x}	15	17	.469	12–8	3.0
Orlando Miracle ^{o}	15	17	.469	9–11	3.0
Washington Mystics ^{o}	12	20	.375	10–10	6.0
Cleveland Rockers ^{o}	7	25	.219	5–15	11.0

=== 1998 season ===
Eastern Conference	W	L	PCT	Conf.	GB
Cleveland Rockers ^{x}	20	10	.667	12–4	–
Charlotte Sting ^{x}	18	12	.600	11–5	2.0
New York Liberty ^{o}	18	12	.600	8–8	2.0
Detroit Shock ^{o}	17	13	.567	8–8	3.0
Washington Mystics ^{o}	3	27	.100	1–15	17.0

=== 1997 season ===
Eastern Conference	W	L	PCT	Conf.	GB
Houston Comets ^{x}	18	10	.643	6–6	–
New York Liberty ^{x}	17	11	.607	8–4	1.0
Charlotte Sting ^{x}	15	13	.536	5–7	3.0
Cleveland Rockers ^{o}	15	13	.536	5–7	3.0
