= WNBA playoffs =

Elimination tournament

- Current season, competition or edition: 2026 WNBA playoffs
- Sport: Basketball
- Founded: 1997
- No. of teams: 8
- Most recent champion: Golden State Valkyries (2026)
- Most titles: Houston Comets; Minnesota Lynx; Seattle Storm (4 titles each)
- Broadcasters: ESPN, ESPN2, ABC NBC, Peacock, (beginning in 2026); USA Network (beginning in 2026) Amazon Prime Video (beginning in 2026)

The WNBA playoffs is an elimination tournament among eight teams in the Women's National Basketball Association (WNBA), ultimately deciding the final two teams who will play in the WNBA Finals.

== Format ==
In the current format of the WNBA playoffs, the top eight teams in the regular season – regardless of conference – participate in a single-elimination tournament system. The eight teams are seeded by their regular season records, with the higher seeded team (or the team with the better record) in each series given homecourt advantage.

Since 2025, the Quarterfinals are a best-of-three series, played with a homecourt pattern of odd–even (the higher seed hosts games 1 and 3, the latter if needed; while the lower seed hosts game 2). The Semifinals are a best-of-five series, played with a homecourt pattern of 2–2–1 (the higher seed hosts games 1 and 2, plus 5 if needed, while the lower seed hosts game 3, plus 4 if needed). The WNBA Finals are a best-of-seven series using a 2-2-1-1-1 homecourt pattern, with the first two games hosted by the higher seed, the next two by the lower seed, and alternating for the last three, all if needed.

=== Tiebreaker procedures ===
In case of ties, the following procedures are followed:

1. Better winning percentage among all head-to-head games involving tied teams.
2. Better winning percentage against all teams with a .500 or better record at the end of the season.
3. Better point differential in games involving tied teams.
4. Better point differential in all games.
5. Coin toss (or draw of lots, if at least 3 teams are still tied after the first 4 tiebreakers fail).

== History ==
WNBA playoffs logo until 2018.

The playoff format has changed throughout the years ever since the league's establishment.

In the league's first two seasons, 1997 and 1998, only the top four teams overall advanced to the playoffs, which comprised only two rounds. In 1997, only a single game was played in all matches. In 1998, each match became a best-of-three series. The homecourt pattern for best-of-three was odd-even.

As expansion began, the playoff format accommodated more teams. 1999 featured six teams, with the top three teams from each conference advancing to the playoffs, and the top seed of each conference getting a bye into the Conference Finals. The following season, it was expanded to eight teams with the top four teams from each conference advancing to the playoffs. In 2005, the WNBA Finals became a best-of-five series. Despite the departure of some teams later on, this format continued until 2015.

From 2016-2021, a new format was introduced, featuring a stepladder-like system. In this format, the first- and second-seeded teams entered the tournament at the Semifinals, third and fourth places started at the Second Round, and the remaining four began at the First Round. The format also eliminated conference seeding, instead having the top eight teams overall advance. The First and Second Rounds were only a single game, with the winning team immediately advancing to the next round. The Semifinals and Finals were both best-of-five series. After each round, the lower surviving seed faced the higher seed in the next round, while the higher surviving seed faced the lower seed.

The current format was adopted in 2022 and features the top 8 teams in the league (regardless of conference) playing a three-round series for the championship. The quarterfinals was a best-of-three series with the higher seed hosting the first two games, the latter at lower-seed if needed; while the Semifinals and Finals remain a best-of-five series. The higher seed hosts the first, second, and (if needed) fifth games. Since 2025, Quarterfinals had gone back to an odd-even pattern, and the Finals became a best-of-seven series, utilising a 2–2–1–1–1 pattern similar to the NBA & NHL, with the higher seed hosting the first and second games, plus the fifth and seventh games if needed.

== Playoff series history ==
=== 2026 Season ===
Main article: 2026 WNBA Playoffs

Further information: 2026 WNBA season

**First round** Best-of-3
1	Minnesota Lynx	0
8	**New York Liberty**	**2**
4	**Atlanta Dream**	**2**
5	Washington Mystics	0
2	**Golden State Valkyries**	**2**
7	Dallas Wings	1
3	**Las Vegas Aces**	**2**
6	Indiana Fever	1

**Semifinals**; Best-of-5
8	New York Liberty	0
4	Atlanta Dream	3
2	Golden State Valkyries	3
3	Las Vegas Aces	0

**Finals**; Best-of-7
4	Atlanta Dream	3
2	Golden State Valkyries	4

Bold - Series Winner Italic - Team with home court advantage

=== 2025 season ===
First Round: Best-of-3
**1**	**Minnesota Lynx**	**2**
8	Golden State Valkyries	0
4	**Phoenix Mercury**	2
5	New York Liberty	1
2	**Las Vegas Aces**	**2**
7	Seattle Storm	1
3	Atlanta Dream	1
6	**Indiana Fever**	**2**

Semifinals: Best-of-5
1	Minnesota Lynx	1
4	**Phoenix Mercury**	**3**
2	**Las Vegas Aces**	**3**
6	Indiana Fever	2

Finals: Best-of-7
4	Phoenix Mercury	0
2	**Las Vegas Aces**	**4**

- **Bold** – Series winner
- Italic – Team with home-court-advantage

=== 2024 season ===
**First round** Best-of-3
**1**	**New York Liberty**	**2**
8	Atlanta Dream	0
**4**	**Las Vegas Aces**	**2**
5	Seattle Storm	0
2	**Minnesota Lynx**	**2**
7	Phoenix Mercury	0
3	**Connecticut Sun**	**2**
6	Indiana Fever	0

**Semifinals**; Best-of-5
1	**New York Liberty**	**3**
4	Las Vegas Aces	1
2	**Minnesota Lynx**	**3**
3	Connecticut Sun	2

**Finals**; Best-of-5
1	**New York Liberty**	**3**
2	Minnesota Lynx	2

- **Bold** – Series winner
- Italic – Team with home-court-advantage

=== 2023 season ===
**First round** Best-of-3
**1**	**Las Vegas Aces**	**2**
8	Chicago Sky	0
**4**	**Dallas Wings**	**2**
5	Atlanta Dream	0
**2**	**New York Liberty**	**2**
7	Washington Mystics	0
**3**	**Connecticut Sun**	**2**
6	Minnesota Lynx	1

**Semifinals**; Best-of-5
**1**	**Las Vegas Aces**	**3**
4	Dallas Wings	0
**2**	**New York Liberty**	**3**
3	Connecticut Sun	1

**Finals**; Best-of-5
1	**Las Vegas Aces**	**3**
2	New York Liberty	1

- **Bold** – Series winner
- Italic – Team with home-court advantage

=== 2022 season ===
**First round** Best-of-3
**1**	**Las Vegas Aces**	**2**
8	Phoenix Mercury	0
**4**	**Seattle Storm**	**2**
5	Washington Mystics	0
**2**	**Chicago Sky**	**2**
7	New York Liberty	1
**3**	**Connecticut Sun**	**2**
6	Dallas Wings	1

**Semifinals**; Best-of-5
**1**	**Las Vegas Aces**	**3**
4	Seattle Storm	1
2	Chicago Sky	2
**3**	**Connecticut Sun**	**3**

**Finals**; Best-of-5
**1**	**Las Vegas Aces**	**3**
3	Connecticut Sun	1

- **Bold** – Series winner
- Italic – Team with home-court advantage

=== 2021 season ===
**First round** single elimination Sept. 23
**5**	**Phoenix Mercury**	**83**
8	New York Liberty	82
**6**	**Chicago Sky**	**81**
7	Dallas Wings	64

**Second round** single elimination Sept. 26
4	Seattle Storm	80
**5**	**Phoenix Mercury**	**85^{OT}**
3	Minnesota Lynx	76
**6**	**Chicago Sky**	**89**

**Semifinals**; Best-of-5; Sept. 28 – Oct. 8
2	Las Vegas Aces	2
**5**	**Phoenix Mercury**	**3**
1	Connecticut Sun	1
**6**	**Chicago Sky**	**3**

**Finals**; Best-of-5; Oct. 10 – 17
5	Phoenix Mercury	1
**6**	**Chicago Sky**	**3**

Note: Teams re-seeded after each round.

- **Bold** – Game or series winner
- Italic – Team with home-court advantage

=== 2020 season ===
**First round** Single elimination (September 15)
5	**Phoenix Mercury**	**85**
8	Washington Mystics	84
6	Chicago Sky	81
7	**Connecticut Sun**	**94**

**Second round** Single elimination (September 17)
4	**Minnesota Lynx**	**80**
5	Phoenix Mercury	79
3	Los Angeles Sparks	59
7	**Connecticut Sun**	**73**

**Semifinals**; Best-of-5 (September 20–29)
1	**Las Vegas Aces**	**3**
7	Connecticut Sun	2
2	**Seattle Storm**	**3**
4	Minnesota Lynx	0

**WNBA Finals**; Best-of-5 (October 2–11)
1	Las Vegas Aces	0
2	**Seattle Storm**	**3**

Note: Teams re-seeded after each round.

- **Bold** – Game or series winner

=== 2019 season ===
**First round** Single elimination (Sept. 11)
5	**Chicago Sky**	**105**
8	Phoenix Mercury	76
6	**Seattle Storm**	**84**
7	Minnesota Lynx	74

**Second round** Single elimination (Sept. 15)
4	**Las Vegas Aces**	**93**
5	Chicago Sky	92
3	**Los Angeles Sparks**	**92**
6	Seattle Storm	69

**Semifinals**; Best-of-5 (Sept. 17 – 24)
1	**Washington Mystics**	**3**
4	Las Vegas Aces	1
2	**Connecticut Sun**	**3**
3	Los Angeles Sparks	0

**WNBA Finals**; Best-of-5 (Sept. 29 – Oct. 10)
1	**Washington Mystics**	**3**
2	Connecticut Sun	2

Note: Teams re-seeded after each round.

- **Bold** – Game or series winner
- Italic – Team with home-court advantage

=== 2018 season ===
**First round** Single elimination (Aug. 21)
5	**Phoenix Mercury**	**101**
8	Dallas Wings	83
6	**Los Angeles Sparks**	**75**
7	Minnesota Lynx	68

**Second round** Single elimination (Aug. 23)
4	Connecticut Sun	86
5	**Phoenix Mercury**	**96**
3	**Washington Mystics**	**96**
6	Los Angeles Sparks	64

**Semifinals**; Best-of-5 (Aug. 26 – Sept. 4)
1	**Seattle Storm**	**3**
5	Phoenix Mercury	2
2	Atlanta Dream	2
3	**Washington Mystics**	**3**

**WNBA Finals**; Best-of-5 (Sept. 7 – Sept. 12)
1	**Seattle Storm**	**3**
3	Washington Mystics	0

Note: Teams re-seeded after second round and semi-finals.

- **Bold** – Game or series winner
- Italic – Team with home-court advantage

=== 2017 season ===
**First round** Single elimination (Sept. 6)
5	**Phoenix Mercury**	**79**
8	Seattle Storm	69
6	**Washington Mystics**	**86**
7	Dallas Wings	76

**Second round** Single elimination (Sept. 10)
4	Connecticut Sun	83
5	**Phoenix Mercury**	**88**
3	New York Liberty	68
6	**Washington Mystics**	**82**

**Semifinals**; Best-of-5 (Sept. 12 – Sept. 17)
2	**Los Angeles Sparks**	**3**
5	Phoenix Mercury	0
1	**Minnesota Lynx**	**3**
6	Washington Mystics	0

**WNBA Finals**; Best-of-5 (Sept. 24 – Oct. 4)
1	**Minnesota Lynx**	**3**
2	Los Angeles Sparks	2

Note: Teams re-seeded after second round and semi-finals.

- **Bold** – Game or series winner
- Italic – Team with home-court advantage

=== 2016 season ===
**First round** Single elimination (Sept. 21)
5	Indiana Fever	78
8	**Phoenix Mercury**	**89**
6	**Atlanta Dream**	**94**
7	Seattle Storm	85

**Second round** Single elimination (Sept. 24 and 25)
3	New York Liberty	94
8	**Phoenix Mercury**	**101**
4	**Chicago Sky**	**108**
6	Atlanta Dream	98

**Semifinals**; Best-of-5 (Sept. 28 – Oct. 6)
1	**Minnesota Lynx**	**3**
8	Phoenix Mercury	0
2	**Los Angeles Sparks**	**3**
4	Chicago Sky	1

**WNBA Finals**; Best-of-5 (Oct. 9 – 20)
1	Minnesota Lynx	2
2	**Los Angeles Sparks**	**3**

Note: Teams re-seeded after the second round and semifinals.

- **Bold** – Game or series winner
- Italic – Team with home-court advantage

=== 2015 season ===
**Conference semifinals** Best-of-3
E1	**New York**	**2**
E4	Washington	1
**Eastern Conference**
E2	Chicago	1
E3	**Indiana**	**2**
W1	**Minnesota**	**2**
W4	Los Angeles	1
**Western Conference**
W2	**Phoenix**	**2**
W3	Tulsa	0

**Conference finals** Best-of-3
E1	New York	1
E3	**Indiana**	**2**
W1	**Minnesota**	**2**
W2	Phoenix	0

**WNBA Finals**; Best-of-5
E3	Indiana	2
W1	**Minnesota**	**3**

- **Bold** – Series winner
- Italics – Team with home-court advantage

=== 2014 season ===
There were 12 teams in the league. For the playoffs, the four teams with the best record in each conference were seeded one to four.

**Conference semifinals** Best-of-3
E1	Atlanta	1
E4	**Chicago**	**2**
**Eastern Conference**
E2	**Indiana**	**2**
E3	Washington	0
W1	**Phoenix**	**2**
W4	Los Angeles	0
**Western Conference**
W2	**Minnesota**	**2**
W3	San Antonio	0

**Conference finals** Best-of-3
E4	**Chicago**	**2**
E2	Indiana	1
W1	**Phoenix**	**2**
W2	Minnesota	1

**WNBA Finals**; Best-of-5
E4	Chicago	0
W1	**Phoenix**	**3**

- **Bold** – Series winner
- Italics – Team with home-court advantage

=== 2013 season ===
There were 12 teams in the league. For the playoffs, the four teams with the best record in each conference were seeded one to four.

**Conference semifinals** Best-of-3
E1	Chicago	0
E4	**Indiana**	**2**
Eastern Conference
E2	**Atlanta**	**2**
E3	Washington	1
W1	**Minnesota**	**2**
W4	Seattle	0
Western Conference
W2	Los Angeles	1
W3	**Phoenix**	**2**

**Conference finals** Best-of-3
E4	Indiana	0
E2	**Atlanta**	**2**
W1	**Minnesota**	**2**
W3	Phoenix	0

**WNBA Finals**; Best-of-5
E2	Atlanta	0
W1	**Minnesota**	**3**

- **Bold** – Series winner
- Italics – Team with home-court advantage

=== 2012 season ===
There were 12 teams in the league. For the playoffs, the four teams with the best record in each conference were seeded one to four.

**Conference semifinals** Best-of-3
E1	**Connecticut**	2
E4	New York	0
**Eastern Conference**
E2	**Indiana**	2
E3	Atlanta	1
W1	**Minnesota**	2
W4	Seattle	1
**Western Conference**
W2	**Los Angeles**	2
W3	San Antonio	0

**Conference finals** Best-of-3
E1	Connecticut	1
E2	**Indiana**	2
W1	**Minnesota**	2
W2	Los Angeles	0

**WNBA Finals**; Best-of-5
E2	**Indiana**	3
W1	Minnesota	1

- **Bold** – Series winner
- Italic – Team with home-court advantage

=== 2011 season ===
There were 12 teams in the league. For the playoffs, the four teams with the best record in each conference were seeded one to four.

**Conference semifinals** Best-of-3
E1	**Indiana**	**2**
E4	New York	1
**Eastern Conference**
E2	Connecticut	0
E3	**Atlanta**	**2**
W1	**Minnesota**	**2**
W4	San Antonio	1
**Western Conference**
W2	Seattle	1
W3	**Phoenix**	**2**

**Conference finals** Best-of-3
E1	Indiana	1
E3	**Atlanta**	**2**
W1	**Minnesota**	**2**
W3	Phoenix	0

**WNBA Finals**; Best-of-5
E3	Atlanta	0
W1	**Minnesota**	**3**

- **Bold** – Series winner
- Italics – Team with home-court advantage

=== 2010 season ===
There were 12 teams in the league. For the playoffs, the four teams with the best record in each conference were seeded one to four. Starting in 2010, the first two rounds changed to a 1-1-1 format, with the higher-seeded team hosting games 1 & 3.

**Conference semifinals** Best-of-3
E1	Washington	0
E4	**Atlanta**	**2**
**Eastern Conference**
E2	**New York**	**2**
E3	Indiana	1
W1	**Seattle**	**2**
W4	Los Angeles	0
**Western Conference**
W2	**Phoenix**	**2**
W3	San Antonio	0

**Conference finals** Best-of-3
E4	**Atlanta**	**2**
E2	New York	0
W1	**Seattle**	**2**
W2	Phoenix	0

**WNBA Finals**; Best-of-5
E4	Atlanta	0
W1	**Seattle**	**3**

- **Bold** – Series winner
- Italics – Team with home-court advantage

=== 2009 season ===
There were 13 teams in the league. For the playoffs, the four teams with the best record in each conference were seeded one to four.

**Conference Semi-Finals**; Best-of-3
E1	**Indiana**	**2**
E4	Washington	0
**Eastern Conference**
E2	Atlanta	0
E3	**Detroit**	**2**
W1	**Phoenix**	**2**
W4	San Antonio	1
**Western Conference**
W2	Seattle	1
W3	**Los Angeles**	**2**

**Conference Finals**; Best-of-3
E1	**Indiana**	**2**
E3	Detroit	1
W1	**Phoenix**	**2**
W3	Los Angeles	1

**WNBA Finals**; Best-of-5
E1	Indiana	2
W1	**Phoenix**	**3**

- **Bold** – Series winner
- Italics – Team with home-court advantage

=== 2008 season ===
There were 14 teams in the league. For the playoffs, the four teams with the best record in each conference were seeded one to four.

**Conference Semi-Finals**; Best-of-3
E1	**Detroit**	**2**
E4	Indiana	1
**Eastern Conference**
E2	Connecticut	1
E3	**New York**	**2**
W1	**San Antonio**	**2**
W4	Sacramento	1
**Western Conference**
W2	Seattle	1
W3	**Los Angeles**	**2**

**Conference Finals**; Best-of-3
E1	**Detroit**	**2**
E3	New York	1
W1	**San Antonio**	**2**
W3	Los Angeles	1

**WNBA Finals**; Best-of-5
E1	**Detroit**	**3**
W1	San Antonio	0

- **Bold** – Series winner
- Italics – Team with home-court advantage

=== 2007 season ===
There were 13 teams in the league. For the playoffs, the four teams with the best record in each conference were seeded one to four.

**Conference Semi-Finals**; Best-of-3
E1	**Detroit**	**2**
E4	New York	1
**Eastern Conference**
E2	**Indiana**	**2**
E3	Connecticut	1
W1	**Phoenix**	**2**
W4	Seattle	0
**Western Conference**
W2	**San Antonio**	**2**
W3	Sacramento	1

**Conference Finals**; Best-of-3
E1	**Detroit**	**2**
E2	Indiana	1
W1	**Phoenix**	**2**
W2	San Antonio	0

**WNBA Finals**; Best-of-5
E1	Detroit	2
W1	**Phoenix**	**3**

- **Bold** – Series winner
- Italics – Team with home-court advantage

=== 2006 season ===
There were 14 teams in the league. For the playoffs, the four teams with the best record in each conference were seeded one to four.

**Conference Semi-Finals**; Best-of-3
E1	**Connecticut**	**2**
E4	Washington	0
**Eastern Conference**
E2	**Detroit**	**2**
E3	Indiana	0
W1	**Los Angeles**	**2**
W4	Seattle	1
**Western Conference**
W2	**Sacramento**	**2**
W3	Houston	0

**Conference Finals**; Best-of-3
E1	Connecticut	1
E2	**Detroit**	**2**
W1	Los Angeles	0
W2	**Sacramento**	**2**

**WNBA Finals**; Best-of-5
E2	**Detroit**	**3**
W2	Sacramento	2

- **Bold** – Series winner
- Italics – Team with home-court advantage

=== 2005 season ===
There were 13 teams in the league. For the playoffs, the four teams with the best record in each conference were seeded one to four, this was also the first season where the WNBA finals was expanded to a best-of-5 game series.

**Conference Semi-Finals**; Best-of-3
E1	**Connecticut**	**2**
E4	Detroit	0
**Eastern Conference**
E2	**Indiana**	**2**
E3	New York	0
W1	**Sacramento**	**2**
W4	Los Angeles	0
**Western Conference**
W2	Seattle	1
W3	**Houston**	**2**

**Conference Finals**; Best-of-3
E1	**Connecticut**	**2**
E2	Indiana	0
W1	**Sacramento**	**2**
W3	Houston	0

**WNBA Finals**; Best-of-5
E1	Connecticut	1
W1	**Sacramento**	**3**

- **Bold** – Series winner
- Italics – Team with home-court advantage

=== 2004 season ===
There were 13 teams in the league. For the playoffs, the four teams with the best record in each conference were seeded one to four.

**Conference Semi-Finals**; Best-of-3
E1	**Connecticut**	**2**
E4	Washington	1
**Eastern Conference**
E2	**New York**	**2**
E3	Detroit	1
W1	Los Angeles	1
W4	**Sacramento**	**2**
**Western Conference**
W2	**Seattle**	**2**
W3	Minnesota	0

**Conference Finals**; Best-of-3
E1	**Connecticut**	**2**
E2	New York	0
W4	Sacramento	1
W2	**Seattle**	**2**

**WNBA Finals**; Best-of-3
E1	Connecticut	1
W2	**Seattle**	**2**

- **Bold** – Series winner
- Italics – Team with home-court advantage

=== 2003 season ===
There were 14 teams in the league. For the playoffs, the four teams with the best record in each conference were seeded one to four.

**Conference Semi-Finals**; Best-of-3
E1	**Detroit**	**2**
E4	Cleveland	1
**Eastern Conference**
E2	Charlotte	0
E3	**Connecticut**	**2**
W1	**Los Angeles**	**2**
W4	Minnesota	1
**Western Conference**
W2	Houston	1
W3	**Sacramento**	**2**

**Conference Finals**; Best-of-3
E1	**Detroit**	**2**
E3	Connecticut	0
W1	**Los Angeles**	**2**
W3	Sacramento	1

**WNBA Finals**; Best-of-3
E1	**Detroit**	**2**
W1	Los Angeles	1

- **Bold** – Series winner
- Italics – Team with home-court advantage

=== 2002 season ===
There were 16 teams in the league. For the playoffs, the four teams with the best record in each conference were seeded one to four.

**Conference Semi-Finals**; Best-of-3
E1	**New York**	**2**
E4	Indiana	1
**Eastern Conference**
E2	Charlotte	0
E3	**Washington**	**2**
W1	**Los Angeles**	**2**
W4	Seattle	0
**Western Conference**
W2	Houston	1
W3	**Utah**	**2**

**Conference Finals**; Best-of-3
E1	**New York**	**2**
E3	Washington	0
W1	**Los Angeles**	**2**
W3	Utah	0

**WNBA Finals**; Best-of-3
E1	New York	0
W1	**Los Angeles**	**2**

- **Bold** – Series winner
- Italics – Team with home-court advantage

=== 2001 season ===
There were 16 teams in the league. For the playoffs, the four teams with the best record in each conference were seeded one to four.

**Conference Semi-Finals**; Best-of-3
E1	Cleveland	1
E4	**Charlotte**	**2**
**Eastern Conference**
E2	**New York**	**2**
E3	Miami	1
W1	**Los Angeles**	**2**
W4	Houston	0
**Western Conference**
W2	**Sacramento**	**2**
W3	Utah	0

**Conference Finals**; Best-of-3
E4	**Charlotte**	**2**
E2	New York	1
W1	**Los Angeles**	**2**
W2	Sacramento	1

**WNBA Finals**; Best-of-3
E4	Charlotte	0
W1	**Los Angeles**	**2**

- **Bold** – Series winner
- Italics – Team with home-court advantage

=== 2000 season ===
There were 16 teams in the league. For the playoffs, the four teams with the best record in each conference were seeded one to four.

**Conference Semi-Finals**; Best-of-3
E1	**New York**	**2**
E4	Washington	0
**Eastern Conference**
E2	**Cleveland**	**2**
E3	Orlando	1
W1	**Los Angeles**	**2**
W4	Phoenix	0
**Western Conference**
W2	**Houston**	**2**
W3	Sacramento	0

**Conference Finals**; Best-of-3
E1	**New York**	**2**
E2	Cleveland	1
W1	Los Angeles	0
W2	**Houston**	**2**

**WNBA Finals**; Best-of-3
E1	New York	0
W2	**Houston**	**2**

- **Bold** – Series winner
- Italics – Team with home-court advantage

=== 1999 season ===
There were 12 teams in the league. For the playoffs, the three teams with the best record in each conference were seeded one to three. The top seeded team in each conference got a bye for the first round.

**Conference Semi-Finals**; Single Game
**Eastern Conference**
E2	Detroit	54
E3	**Charlotte**	**60**
**Western Conference**
W2	**Los Angeles**	**71**
W3	Sacramento	58

**Conference Finals**; Best-of-3
E1	**New York**	**2**
E3	Charlotte	1
W1	**Houston**	**2**
W2	Los Angeles	1

**WNBA Finals**; Best-of-3
E1	New York	1
W1	**Houston**	**2**

- **Bold** – Game or Series winner
- Italics – Team with home-court advantage

=== 1998 season ===
There were 10 teams in the league. For the playoffs, the four teams with the best record in the league were seeded one to four. Houston was switched to the Western Conference so two Western Conference teams matched up in the WNBA Finals.

**Semifinals**; Best-of-3
1	**Houston**	**2**
4	Charlotte	0
2	Cleveland	1
3	**Phoenix**	**2**

**WNBA Championship**; Best-of-3
1	**Houston**	**2**
3	Phoenix	1

- **Bold** – Series winner
- Italic – Team with home-court advantage

=== 1997 season ===
This was the first year of existence for the WNBA. There were only 8 teams in the league. For the playoffs, the four teams with the best record in the league were seeded one to four. Houston was in the Eastern Conference so two Eastern Conference teams matched up in the WNBA Championship.

**Semifinals** single game
1	**Houston**	**70**
4	Charlotte	54
2	**New York**	**59**
3	Phoenix	41

**WNBA Championship** single game
1	**Houston**	**65**
2	New York	51

- **Bold** – Game winner
- Italic – Team with home-court advantage

== See also ==
- Women's National Basketball Association
- WNBA Finals
