= 2015 Phoenix Mercury season =

- Head coach: Sandy Brondello
- Arena: US Airways Center

Results
- Record: 20–14 (.588)
- Place: 2nd (Western)
- Playoff finish: Lost in Conference Finals to Minnesota Lynx, 2–0

The Phoenix Mercury women's basketball team played in the 2015 season of the WNBA.

== Transactions ==
=== WNBA draft ===
Round	Pick	Player	Nationality	School/Team/Country
1	12	Isabelle Harrison	United States	Tennessee Lady Volunteers
2	18	Alex Harden	United States	Wichita State Shockers
2	24	Žofia Hruščáková	Slovakia	Good Angels Košice
3	36	Promise Amukamara	Nigeria	Good Angels Košice

=== Trades ===
Date	Trade	
TBD	To Phoenix Mercury	To TBD
TBD	TBD	TBD

== Roster ==
2015 Phoenix Mercury roster
Players
Coaches

Pos.	No.	Nat.	Name	Height	Weight	DOB	From	Yrs
F	8	(United States)	Bass, Mistie	6' 3" (1.91m)	189 lb (86kg)	1983-12-02	Duke	8
G	23	(United States)	Bias, Tiffany	5' 7" (1.7m)	135 lb (61kg)	1992-05-22	Oklahoma State	1
G/F	24	(United States)	Bonner, DeWanna	6' 4" (1.93m)	140 lb (64kg)	1987-08-21	Auburn	6
G	20	(United States)	Christon, Shameka	6' 3" (1.91m)	192 lb (87kg)	1982-02-15	Arkansas	10
F	25	(United States)	Currie, Monique	6' 0" (1.83m)	175 lb (79kg)	1983-02-25	Duke	9
F	4	(United States)	Dupree, Candice	6' 2" (1.88m)	178 lb (81kg)	1984-08-16	Temple	9
F/C	22	(Australia)	George, Cayla	6' 4" (1.93m)	192 lb (87kg)	1989-05-01		R
C	42	(United States)	Griner, Brittney	6' 9" (2.06m)	205 lb (93kg)	1990-10-18	Baylor	2
G	12	(United States)	Harden, Alex	6' 0" (1.83m)	173 lb (78kg)	1993-03-27	Wichita State	R
G	9	(Australia)	Madgen, Tess	6' 0" (1.83m)	169 lb (77kg)	1990-08-12		R
G	5	(United States)	Mitchell, Leilani	5' 5" (1.65m)	138 lb (63kg)	1985-06-15	Utah	6
G	45	(United States)	Quinn, Noelle	6' 0" (1.83m)	178 lb (81kg)	1985-01-03	UCLA	8
G	10	(Spain)	Xargay, Marta	5' 11" (1.8m)	160 lb (73kg)	1990-12-20		R

Head coach
(United States) Sandy Brondello (Western Sydney)
Assistant coaches
(United States) Julie Hairgrove (Arizona)
(United States) Todd Troxel (Doane)
Athletic trainer
(United States) Tamara Poole (Cal State Dominguez Hills)
Strength and conditioning coach
(United States) Kristine Foltz (Iowa State)

Legend

- (C) Team captain
- (DP) Unsigned draft pick
- (FA) Free agent
- (S) Suspended
- Injured

== Schedule ==
- MERCURY: Mercury Schedule 2015

=== Preseason ===
2015 pre-season game log
May: 1–1 (Home: 1–0; Road: 0–1)

Game	Date	Team	Score	High points	High rebounds	High assists	Location Attendance	Record
1	May 26	@ Seattle	L 59–73	Brittney Griner (16)	Brittney Griner (11)	Tiffany Bias (3)	KeyArena; 3,693	0–1
2	May 28	Seattle	W 79–73	DeWanna Bonner (21)	Brittney Griner (8)	Leilani Mitchell (5)	Talking Stick Resort Arena; 5,578	1–1

2015 pre-season schedule

=== Regular season ===
2015 game log
Total: 20–14 (Home: 13–4; Road: 7–10)
June: 4–5 (Home: 3–1; Road: 1–4)

Game	Date	Team	Score	High points	High rebounds	High assists	Location Attendance	Record
1	June 5	San Antonio	W 76–71	DeWanna Bonner (21)	Candice Dupree (9)	Bonner, Mitchell (3)	US Airways Center; 11,789	1–0
2	June 11	@ New York	L 57–68	DeWanna Bonner (22)	DeWanna Bonner (6)	Bonner, Mitchell (3)	Madison Square Garden; 5,817	1–1
3	June 12	@ Indiana	L 74–77	Leilani Mitchell (25)	Cayla George (8)	DeWanna Bonner (4)	Bankers Life Fieldhouse; 6,987	1–2
4	June 14	Minnesota	W 81–66	DeWanna Bonner (22)	Cayla George (10)	Leilani Mitchell (10)	US Airways Center; 9,294	2–2
5	June 19	Connecticut	L 78–90 (2OT)	DeWanna Bonner (21)	DeWanna Bonner (9)	DeWanna Bonner (4)	US Airways Center; 8,964	2–3
6	June 21	@ Seattle	W 84–72	DeWanna Bonner (23)	Bonner, Dupree (9)	Cayla George (3)	KeyArena; 5,947	3–3
7	June 25	@ San Antonio	L 71–76	DeWanna Bonner (17)	DeWanna Bonner (9)	DeWanna Bonner (6)	Freeman Coliseum; 3,102	3–4
8	June 27	@ Minnesota	L 56–71	DeWanna Bonner (18)	Brittney Griner (11)	DeWanna Bonner (4)	Target Center; 9,113	3–5
9	June 30	San Antonio	W 85–78	Brittney Griner (23)	Brittney Griner (8)	DeWanna Bonner (7)	US Airways Center; 8,319	4–5

July : 7–2 (Home: 4–1; Road: 3–1)

Game	Date	Team	Score	High points	High rebounds	High assists	Location Attendance	Record
10	July 2	Tulsa	W 86–55	Candice Dupree (16)	Brittney Griner (8)	DeWanna Bonner (4)	US Airways Arena; 8,996	5–5
11	July 5	@ Los Angeles	W 94–91	DeWanna Bonner (22)	Brittney Griner (10)	Candice Dupree (6)	Staples Center; 9,069	6–5
12	July 10	@ Seattle	W 94–79	Candice Dupree (16)	DeWanna Bonner (7)	Candice Dupree (5)	KeyArena; 9,686	7–5
13	July 12	Seattle	W 70–60	Brittney Griner (26)	Brittney Griner (7)	Bonner, Mitchell (5)	US Airways Arena; 9,916	8–5
14	July 14	Atlanta	W 80–71	Dupree, Griner (22)	DeWanna Bonner (8)	DeWanna Bonner (3)	US Airways Arena; 10,472	9–5
15	July 18	New York	L 73–75	Brittney Griner (15)	Brittney Griner (8)	Leilani Mitchell (6)	US Airways Arena; 10,096	9–6
16	July 21	@ Los Angeles	L 65–70	DeWanna Bonner (15)	Brittney Griner (7)	Dupree, George (3)	Staples Center; 10,707	9–7
17	July 28	Chicago	W 89–87 (OT)	DeWanna Bonner (34)	Bonner, Griner (8)	Bonner, Mitchell (3)	US Airways Arena; 10,707	10–7
18	July 30	@ Tulsa	W 78–66	DeWanna Bonner (24)	Brittney Griner (10)	Leilani Mitchell (5)	BOK Center; 4,673	11–7

August : 6–6 (Home: 4–2; Road: 2–4)

Game	Date	Team	Score	High points	High rebounds	High assists	Location Attendance	Record
19	August 2	@ Atlanta	W 71–68	Candice Dupree (27)	DeWanna Bonner (10)	DeWanna Bonner (5)	Philips Arena; 7,352	12–7
20	August 4	Tulsa	W 87–84 (OT)	DeWanna Bonner (25)	Brittney Griner (13)	Mitchell, Quinn (4)	US Airways Arena; 8,824	13–7
21	August 7	Minnesota	W 73–66	Bonner, Xargay (15)	Brittney Griner (12)	Dupree, Bonner (4)	US Airways Arena; 10,120	14–7
22	August 9	@ Chicago	L 64–74	Brittney Griner (21)	Brittney Griner (14)	DeWanna Bonner (5)	Allstate Arena; 7,181	14–8
23	August 12	Seattle	W 83–66	Noelle Quinn (13)	Mistie Bass (10)	Noelle Quinn (5)	US Airways Arena; 8,906	15–8
24	August 16	Indiana	L 63–75	Dupree, Griner (12)	Candice Dupree (7)	DeWanna Bonner (3)	US Airways Arena; 11,336	15–9
25	August 18	@ Tulsa	L 59–74	Candice Dupree (18)	Brittney Griner (7)	Noelle Quinn (3)	BOK Center; 4,566	15–10
26	August 21	Los Angeles	L 68–78	Brittney Griner (20)	Dupree, Griner (6)	Marta Xargay (7)	US Airways Arena; 11,237	15–11
27	August 23	Minnesota	W 79–67	DeWanna Bonner (21)	Brittney Griner (11)	Marta Xargay (4)	US Airways Arena; 9,492	16–11
28	August 27	@ Connecticut	W 81–80	DeWanna Bonner (26)	Brittney Griner (13)	Bonner, Mitchell (3)	Mohegan Sun Arena; 5,171	17–11
29	August 28	@ Washington	L 63–71	Leilani Mitchell (16)	Brittney Griner (9)	DeWanna Bonner (7)	Capital One Arena; 7,400	17–12
30	August 30	@ Minnesota	L 61–71	DeWanna Bonner (15)	Candice Dupree (8)	Noelle Quinn (5)	Target Center; 9,123	17–13

September : 3–1 (Home: 2–0; Road: 1–1)

Game	Date	Team	Score	High points	High rebounds	High assists	Location Attendance	Record
31	September 2	Washington	W 73–53	Candice Dupree (18)	Dupree, George, Bass (6)	Marta Xargay (4)	US Airways Center; 8,370	18–13
32	September 5	@ San Antonio	W 82–52	Brittney Griner (22)	Candice Dupree (8)	Noelle Quinn (7)	Freeman Coliseum; 6,076	19–13
33	September 11	Los Angeles	W 70–65	Monique Currie (22)	Candice Dupree (9)	Marta Xargay (5)	US Airways Center; 12,296	20–13
34	September 13	@ Tulsa	L 87–91	Monique Currie (26)	Bass, George (12)	Marta Xargay (5)	BOK Center; 6,064	20–14

2015 season schedule

=== Playoffs ===
2015 playoff game log
First Round vs. Indiana Fever
Won Series 2–0

Game	Date	Team	Score	High points	High rebounds	High assists	Location Attendance	Series
1	September 17	Tulsa	W 88–55	Brittney Griner (18)	Brittney Griner (8)	Leilani Mitchell (6)	US Airways Center; 8,509	1–0
2	September 19	@ Tulsa	W 91–67	Brittney Griner (23)	Brittney Griner (12)	Xargay, Mitchell (3)	BOK Center; 3,261	2–0

Semifinals vs. Minnesota Lynx
Lost Series 0–2

Game	Date	Team	Score	High points	High rebounds	High assists	Location Attendance	Series
1	September 24	@ Minnesota	L 60–67	DeWanna Bonner (21)	Candice Dupree (12)	DeWanna Bonner (5)	Target Center; 8,732	0–1
2	September 27	@ Minnesota	L 71–72	Candice Dupree (16)	Monique Currie (7)	Monique Currie (6)	US Airway Center; 9,871	0–2

2015 playoff schedule

== Standings ==
Western Conference	W	L	PCT	GB	Home	Road	Conf.
**z** - Minnesota Lynx	22	12	.647	–	13–4	9–8	16–6
**x** - Phoenix Mercury	20	14	.588	2	13–4	7–10	15–7
**x** - Tulsa Shock	18	16	.529	4	12–5	6–11	11–11
**x** - Los Angeles Sparks	14	20	.412	8	9–8	5–12	10–12
**e** - Seattle Storm	10	24	.294	12	8–9	2–15	8–14
**e** - San Antonio Stars	8	26	.235	14	7–10	1–16	6–16

=== Playoffs ===
**Conference semifinals** Best-of-3
E1	**New York**	**2**
E4	Washington	1
**Eastern Conference**
E2	Chicago	1
E3	**Indiana**	**2**
W1	**Minnesota**	**2**
W4	Los Angeles	1
**Western Conference**
W2	**Phoenix**	**2**
W3	Tulsa	0

**Conference finals** Best-of-3
E1	New York	1
E3	**Indiana**	**2**
W1	**Minnesota**	**2**
W2	Phoenix	0

**WNBA Finals**; Best-of-5
E3	Indiana	2
W1	**Minnesota**	**3**

- **Bold** – Series winner
- Italics – Team with home-court advantage

== Statistics ==
Legend
GP	Games played	GS	Games started	MPG	Minutes per game	RPG	Rebounds per game
APG	Assists per game	SPG	Steals per game	BPG	Blocks per game	PPG	Points per game
FG%	Field-goal percentage	3P%	3-point field-goal percentage	FT%	Free-throw percentage	TO	Turnovers per game
PF	Fouls per game		Team leader		League leader

=== Regular season ===
Player	GP	GS	MPG	FG%	3P%	FT%	RPG	APG	SPG	BPG	PPG
DeWanna Bonner	33	33	33.3	37.8%	25.4%	86.6%	5.7	3.3	1.3	0.8	15.8
Candice Dupree	33	33	31.2	51.2%	—	80.2%	5.1	1.7	1.0	0.4	14.1
Brittney Griner	26	26	30.7	56.5%	—	77.3%	8.1	1.3	0.3	4.0	15.1
Leilani Mitchell	34	26	23.0	37.4%	39.6%	88.9%	2.1	2.7	1.0	0.1	6.7
Monique Currie	34	34	21.3	41.1%	36.4%	86.4%	3.2	1.5	0.9	0.4	8.4
Noelle Quinn	34	1	18.6	42.2%	32.4%	79.2%	2.6	1.9	0.4	0.3	4.1
Marta Xargay	20	8	17.5	39.2%	37.5%	73.3%	1.8	2.4	0.5	0.2	3.9
Mistie Bass	33	7	13.9	51.4%	—	54.5%	3.0	0.7	0.8	0.7	4.1
Cayla George	34	2	12.7	42.7%	28.3%	86.4%	3.1	0.7	0.4	0.6	5.0
Alex Harden	32	0	12.2	27.0%	26.1%	92.3%	1.4	0.9	0.7	0.4	2.1
Tess Madgen	8	0	7.4	37.5%	60.0%	50.0%	0.8	0.3	0.8	0.3	1.3
Shameka Christon	12	0	6.3	42.9%	25.0%	100%	0.4	0.6	0.2	—	2.8
Tiffany Bias	15	0	6.3	34.5%	33.3%	66.7%	0.1	0.7	0.1	—	1.9

=== Playoffs ===
Player	GP	GS	MPG	FG%	3P%	FT%	RPG	APG	SPG	BPG	PPG
DeWanna Bonner	4	4	31.8	45.1%	45.0%	93.3%	6.0	2.5	0.3	0.8	17.3
Candice Dupree	4	4	30.3	45.2%	—	75.0%	5.3	1.5	1.3	—	11.0
Brittney Griner	4	4	29.8	58.3%	—	88.5%	8.0	1.3	0.8	4.5	16.3
Monique Currie	4	4	24.0	38.1%	25.0%	63.6%	3.0	2.5	0.8	0.8	10.3
Marta Xargay	4	4	23.3	40.0%	40.0%	100%	3.8	2.3	0.3	—	6.0
Noelle Quinn	4	0	20.3	77.8%	100%	—	2.8	0.8	0.5	0.3	4.3
Leilani Mitchell	4	26	14.8	42.9%	50.0%	50.0%	1.8	3.5	1.5	0.3	4.0
Mistie Bass	4	0	13.5	46.2%	—	25.0%	1.5	0.3	0.3	0.3	3.3
Cayla George	3	0	9.0	37.5%	50.0%	—	2.7	1.0	1.7	1.7	2.7
Shameka Christon	2	0	5.0	100%	100%	100%	0.5	1.0	—	—	4.0
Tiffany Bias	2	0	3.5	50.0%	—	50.0%	0.5	0.5	0.5	—	2.5
Alex Harden	2	0	3.0	—	—	—	—	—	—	0.5	—

== Awards and honors ==
Recipient	Award	Date Awarded
DeWanna Bonner	All-WNBA First Team	October 8, 2015
DeWanna Bonner	WNBA All-Defensive Second Team	September 27, 2015
DeWanna Bonner	Western Conference Player of the Week	June 14, 2015
Brittney Griner	All-WNBA Second Team	October 8, 2015
Brittney Griner	WNBA Defensive Player of the Year	September 17, 2015
Brittney Griner	WNBA All-Defensive First Team	September 27, 2015
Brittney Griner	Western Conference Player of the Week	August 10, 2015
