= 2015 Los Angeles Sparks season =

- Head coach: Brian Agler
- Arena: Staples Center

Results
- Record: 14–20 (.412)
- Place: 4th (Western)
- Playoff finish: Lost in Conference Semifinals

Media
- Television: Time Warner Cable SportsNet; ESPN2, NBATV

The 2015 Los Angeles Sparks season was the franchise's 19th season in the Women's National Basketball Association, and the first full season under head coach Brian Agler. The season began on June 6, on the road against the Seattle Storm. The Sparks lost that game, and went on to lose all seven of their games in June. Their closest losses were on June 23 and June 26 against the Washington Mystics and Connecticut Sun. Both losses were by four points, but the Sun game went into overtime where the Sparks lost 80–76. The Sparks' first win of the season came on June 2 against the San Antonio Stars. The followed the win with a defeat of Tulsa. A five game losing streak followed the two wins. The streak started with an overtime loss against Phoenix. The Sparks ended the streak with a five-point win over Phoenix. The Sparks lost two games and won the final game of July to finish the month 4–7. The Sparks experienced a resurgence in August, winning their first three games of the month, which included an 83–61 victory over Minnesota. They would then lose to Minnesota and Seattle before winning four of their next five games. Their loss during this stretch was against Indiana. They achieved three of their five road wins during the streak. They lost to Tulsa and defeated San Antonio to end the month 8–4. They began September with home defeats of Washington and Tulsa and finished with road losses against Atlanta and Phoenix. The Sparks finished 2–2 in September to finish with a final record of 14–20.

Their 14–20 record earned them the fourth seed in the Western Conference. Therefore, they faced-off against first-seed Minnesota in the first round of the 2015 WNBA playoffs. During the regular season, the teams met four times, with Minnesota winning three match-ups. The first game was in Minnesota and the Sparks lost a close game 67–65. The series returned to Los Angeles, where the Sparks won 81–71 to force a third game. In the final game of the series, back in Minnesota, the Sparks were defeated 91–80 to end their season. Their fourteen total wins were their lowest since 2010, and this was their fourth straight playoff appearance.

== Transactions ==
=== WNBA draft ===
Round	Pick	Player	Nationality	School/Team/Country
1	7	Crystal Bradford	United States	Central Michigan
2	14 (through Sea.)	Cierra Burdick	United States	Tennessee
3	31	Andrea Hoover	United States	Dayton

=== Trades/Roster Changes ===
Date	Transaction
February 11	Signed Erin Phillips
February 26	Signed Alana Beard
March 18	Signed Jantel Lavender
March 23	Signed Temeka Johnson

== Roster ==
2015 Los Angeles Sparks roster
Players
Coaches

Pos.	No.	Nat.	Name	Height	Weight	DOB	From	Yrs
F	13	(Sweden)	Abdi, Farhiya	6' 2" (1.88m)	180 lb (82kg)	1992-05-31	Sweden	2
G/F	0	(United States)	Beard, Alana	5' 11" (1.8m)	160 lb (73kg)	1982-05-14	Duke	9
G	15	(United States)	Bradford, Crystal	6' 0" (1.83m)	170 lb (77kg)	1993-11-01	Central Michigan	R
G	23	(Serbia)	Dabović, Ana	6' 0" (1.83m)	157 lb (71kg)	1989-08-18	Serbia	R
C	5	(United States)	Hamson, Jennifer	6' 7" (2.01m)	210 lb (95kg)	1992-01-23	BYU	R
G	2	(United States)	Johnson, Temeka	5' 3" (1.6m)	142 lb (64kg)	1982-09-06	LSU	10
C	42	(United States)	Lavender, Jantel	6' 4" (1.93m)	185 lb (84kg)	1988-11-12	Ohio State	4
F	30	(United States)	Ogwumike, Nneka	6' 2" (1.88m)	188 lb (85kg)	1990-07-02	Stanford	3
F/C	3	(United States)	Parker, Candace	6' 4" (1.93m)	175 lb (79kg)	1986-04-19	Tennessee	7
G	31	(Australia)	Phillips, Erin	5' 8" (1.73m)	165 lb (75kg)	1985-05-19	Australia	7
C	22	(United States)	Snow, Michelle	6' 5" (1.96m)	145 lb (66kg)	1980-03-20	Tennessee	12
G	20	(United States)	Toliver, Kristi	5' 7" (1.7m)	130 lb (59kg)	1987-01-27	Maryland	6

Head coach
(United States) Brian Agler (Wittenberg)
Assistant coaches
(United States) Curt Miller (Baldwin Wallace)
(United States) Amber Stocks (Cincinnati)
Athletic trainer
(United States) Courtney Watson (California)
Strength and conditioning coach
(United States) Kelly Dormandy (Springfield)

Legend

- (C) Team captain
- (DP) Unsigned draft pick
- (FA) Free agent
- (S) Suspended
- Injured

== Game log ==
=== Preseason ===
2015 pre-season game log
May: 2–0 (Home: 0–0; Road: 2–0)

Game	Date	Team	Score	High points	High rebounds	High assists	Location Attendance	Record
1	May 27	vs. Chicago	W 76–67	Nneka Ogwumike (15)	Lavender, Ogwumike (10)	Erin Phillips (8)	Mohegan Sun Arena; 3,947	1–0
2	May 28	@ Connecticut	W 64–57	Nneka Ogwumike (14)	Jantel Lavender (10)	Erin Phillips (7)	Mohegan Sun Arena; 4,006	2–0

2015 pre-season schedule

=== Regular season ===
2015 game log
Total: 14–20 (Home: 9–8; Road: 5–12)
June: 0–7 (Home: 0–3; Road: 0–4)

Game	Date	Team	Score	High points	High rebounds	High assists	Location Attendance	Record
1	June 6	@ Seattle	L 61–86	Alana Beard (20)	Jantel Lavender (12)	Erin Phillips (5)	KeyArena; 9,686	0–1
2	June 14	Seattle	L 54–60	Jantel Lavender (12)	Jantel Lavender (9)	Erin Phillips (5)	Staples Center; 12,148	0–2
3	June 16	Minnesota	L 52–67	Jantel Lavender (12)	Jantel Lavender (13)	Temeka Johnson (7)	Staples Center; 6,968	0–3
4	June 21	Connecticut	L 68–76	Jantel Lavender (17)	Jantel Lavender (10)	Temeka Johnson (10)	Staples Center; 6,875	0–4
5	June 23	@ Washington	L 80–84	Jantel Lavender (18)	Jantel Lavender (9)	Temeka Johnson (10)	Capital One Arena; 7,400	0–5
6	June 26	@ Connecticut	L 76–80 (OT)	Jantel Lavender (22)	Jantel Lavender (12)	Temeka Johnson (4)	Mohegan Sun Arena; 5,542	0–6
7	June 28	@ New York	L 70–79	Kristi Toliver (30)	Nneka Ogwumike (16)	Temeka Johnson (6)	Madison Square Garden; 8,926	0–7

July : 4–7 (Home: 3–3; Road: 1–4)

Game	Date	Team	Score	High points	High rebounds	High assists	Location Attendance	Record
8	June 2	San Antonio	W 86–81	Nneka Ogwumike (27)	Jantel Lavender (10)	Temeka Johnson (5)	Staples Center; 6,287	1–7
9	June 3	Tulsa	W 98–95	Kristi Toliver (43)	Nneka Ogwumike (10)	Kristi Toliver (9)	Staples Center; 6,358	2–7
10	June 5	Phoenix	L 91–94 (OT)	Nneka Ogwumike (26)	Nneka Ogwumike (19)	Kristi Toliver (8)	Staples Center; 9,069	2–8
11	June 8	@ San Antonio	L 63–70	Jantel Lavender (19)	Nneka Ogwumike (13)	Kristi Toliver (7)	Freeman Coliseum; 3,100	2–9
12	June 11	@ Tulsa	L 67–82	Nneka Ogwumike (22)	Nneka Ogwumike (13)	Kristi Toliver (6)	BOK Center; 6,144	2–10
13	June 15	@ Seattle	L 61–68	Nneka Ogwumike (12)	Nneka Ogwumike (7)	Temeka Johnson (6)	KeyArena; 9,686	2–11
14	June 16	Atlanta	L 72–76	Jantel Lavender (20)	Jantel Lavender (11)	Kristi Toliver (8)	Staples Center; 14,510	2–12
15	June 21	Phoenix	W 70–65	Jantel Lavender (19)	Jantel Lavender (11)	Dabović, Johnson (4)	Staples Center; 7,146	3–12
16	June 22	New York	L 53–59	Kristi Toliver (16)	Nneka Ogwumike (8)	Erin Phillips (4)	Staples Center; 7,354	3–13
17	June 29	@ Minnesota	L 76–82	Jantel Lavender (15)	Jantel Lavender (10)	Candace Parker (9)	Target Center; 8,913	3–14
18	June 31	@ Chicago	W 88–77	Candace Parker (31)	Candace Parker (9)	Johnson, Parker (4)	Allstate Arena; 7,014	4–14

August : 8–4 (Home: 4–2; Road: 4–2)

Game	Date	Team	Score	High points	High rebounds	High assists	Location Attendance	Record
19	August 2	@ San Antonio	W 80–78	Jantel Lavender (20)	Candace Parker (11)	Alana Beard (7)	Freeman Coliseum; 5,416	5–14
20	August 4	Minnesota	W 83–61	Candace Parker (18)	Lavender, Parker (13)	Alana Beard (7)	Staples Center; 8,746	6–14
21	August 6	Tulsa	W 84–57	Nneka Ogwumike (26)	Candace Parker (12)	Candace Parker (6)	Staples Center; 8,056	7–14
22	August 9	@ Minnesota	L 64–72	Nneka Ogwumike (18)	Lavender, Parker (8)	Parker, Toliver (6)	Target Center; 9,021	7–15
23	August 11	Seattle	L 77–85	Jantel Lavender(22)	Candace Parker (10)	Candace Parker (9)	Staples Center; 8,068	7–16
24	August 16	Chicago	W 76–64	Candace Parker (21)	Lavender, Parker (8)	Candace Parker (10)	Staples Center; 9,053	8–16
25	August 18	Indiana	L 68–79	Candace Parker (25)	Candace Parker (10)	Candace Parker (6)	Staples Center; 7,046	8–17
26	August 21	@ Phoenix	W 78–68	Candace Parker (26)	Jantel Lavender (11)	Lavender, Parker, Toliver (3)	US Airways Center; 11,237	9–17
27	August 23	@ San Antonio	W 90–59	Jantel Lavender (22)	Candace Parker (12)	Candace Parker (9)	Freeman Coliseum; 3,972	10–17
28	August 26	@ Indiana	W 81–79	Ana Dabović (18)	Candace Parker (10)	Candace Parker (9)	Bankers Life Fieldhouse; 6,822	11–17
29	August 28	@ Tulsa	L 66–76	Candace Parker (24)	Candace Parker (11)	Johnson, Parker, Toliver (4)	BOK Center; 4,776	11–18
30	August 30	San Antonio	W 60–52	Jantel Lavender (24)	Candace Parker (11)	Ana Dabović (6)	Staples Center; 19,076	12–18

September : 2–2 (Home: 2–0; Road: 0–2)

Game	Date	Team	Score	High points	High rebounds	High assists	Location Attendance	Record
31	September 3	Washington	W 93–91	Candace Parker (26)	Candace Parker (11)	Candace Parker (6)	Staples Center; 7,223	13–18
32	September 6	Tulsa	W 92–73	Candace Parker (33)	Lavender, Ogwumike (9)	Kristi Toliver (6)	Staples Center; 10,114	14–18
33	September 9	@ Atlanta	L 60–90	Jantel Lavender (14)	Abdi, Lavender (6)	Ana Dabović (8)	Philips Arena; 3,856	14–19
34	September 11	@ Phoenix	L 65–70	Jennifer Hamson (12)	Jennfier Hamson (7)	Ana Dabović (7)	US Airways Center; 12,296	14–20

2015 season schedule

=== Playoffs ===
2015 playoff game log
Conference Semifinals vs.Minnesota Lynx
Lost Series: 1–2

Game	Date	Team	Score	High points	High rebounds	High assists	Location Attendance	Series
1	September 18	@ Minnesota	L 65–67	Candace Parker (16)	Candace Parker (9)	Candace Parker (4)	Target Center; 8,333	0–1
2	September 20	Minnesota	W 81–71	Candace Parker (25)	Candace Parker (10)	Ana Dabović (7)	Walter Pyramid; 3,112	1–1
3	September 22	@ Minnesota	L 80–91	Candace Parker (28)	Candace Parker (13)	Ogwumike, Parker (4)	Target Center; 9,014	1–2

2015 playoff schedule

== Standings ==
Western Conference	W	L	PCT	GB	Home	Road	Conf.
z - Minnesota Lynx	22	12	.647	–	13–4	9–8	16–6
x - Phoenix Mercury	20	14	.588	2	13–4	7–10	15–7
x - Tulsa Shock	18	16	.529	4	12–5	6–11	11–11
x - Los Angeles Sparks	14	20	.412	8	9–8	5–12	10–12
e - Seattle Storm	10	24	.294	12	8–9	2–15	8–14
e - San Antonio Stars	8	26	.235	14	7–10	1–16	6–16

== Playoffs ==
**Conference semifinals** Best-of-3
E1	**New York**	**2**
E4	Washington	1
**Eastern Conference**
E2	Chicago	1
E3	**Indiana**	**2**
W1	**Minnesota**	**2**
W4	Los Angeles	1
**Western Conference**
W2	**Phoenix**	**2**
W3	Tulsa	0

**Conference finals** Best-of-3
E1	New York	1
E3	**Indiana**	**2**
W1	**Minnesota**	**2**
W2	Phoenix	0

**WNBA Finals**; Best-of-5
E3	Indiana	2
W1	**Minnesota**	**3**

- **Bold** – Series winner
- Italics – Team with home-court advantage

== Statistics ==
Legend
GP	Games played	GS	Games started	MPG	Minutes per game	RPG	Rebounds per game
APG	Assists per game	SPG	Steals per game	BPG	Blocks per game	PPG	Points per game
FG%	Field-goal percentage	3P%	3-point field-goal percentage	FT%	Free-throw percentage	TO	Turnovers per game
PF	Fouls per game		Team leader		League leader

=== Regular season ===
Player	GP	GS	MPG	FG%	3P%	FT%	RPG	APG	SPG	BPG	PPG
Candace Parker	16	16	34.4	48.9%	27.9%	81.5%	10.1	6.3	1.9	1.8	19.4
Jantel Lavender	34	34	33.8	52.5%	33.3%	88.2%	8.3	1.8	0.4	1.2	14.5
Nneka Ogwumike	24	23	32.7	52.5%	8.3%	86.6%	7.0	2.1	1.0	0.5	15.8
Kristi Toliver	28	28	30.9	44.9%	38.4%	90.3%	2.3	3.7	0.8	0.0	12.4
Erin Phillips	12	12	30.9	28.6%	26.7%	85.0%	3.0	3.1	0.9	0.2	6.8
Alana Beard	15	11	24.3	49.0%	18.2%	90.0%	2.9	2.5	1.1	0.5	7.3
Ana Dabović	24	8	22.1	44.6%	33.3%	80.8%	1.6	1.9	0.9	0.0	8.8
Jennifer Lacy	8	4	22.0	40.9%	29.6%	—	2.9	0.6	0.3	0.1	5.5
Temeka Johnson	34	11	21.2	32.3%	24.6%	84.1%	2.4	3.6	0.7	—	5.1
Marianna Tolo	28	14	19.0	46.2%	0.0%	80.6%	3.0	1.0	0.3	1.0	4.9
Andrea Hoover	12	1	14.3	31.9%	28.6%	100.0%	1.3	0.3	0.2	0.1	3.8
Farhiya Abdi	18	5	13.2	35.4%	27.3%	57.1%	1.7	0.5	0.4	0.1	3.8
Michelle Snow	2	0	13.0	42.9%	—	0.0%	1.5	—	—	0.5	3.0
Crystal Bradford	15	1	9.5	27.8%	23.1%	71.4%	1.3	0.5	0.4	0.1	2.7
Jasmine Lister	7	0	9.3	53.3%	80.0%	—	1.3	0.6	0.3	—	2.9
Jennifer Hamson	25	2	6.5	55.2%	—	27.6%	1.5	0.2	0.2	0.5	1.6
Courtney Clements	25	1	5.0	0.0%	0.0%	—	1.0	—	—	—	—

=== Playoffs ===
Player	GP	GS	MPG	FG%	3P%	FT%	RPG	APG	SPG	BPG	PPG
Candace Parker	3	3	38.3	41.8%	38.9%	84.2%	10.7	4.7	2.3	1.3	23.0
Alana Beard	3	3	35.0	33.3%	0.0%	75.0%	4.3	1.7	1.7	0.7	6.3
Jantel Lavender	3	3	34.3	57.7%	100.0%	60.0%	6.7	1.0	0.7	0.3	11.3
Nneka Ogwumike	3	3	30.7	60.0%	—	83.3%	4.3	2.0	1.0	0.3	11.7
Kristi Toliver	3	3	29.7	36.7%	38.5%	75.0%	1.7	3.0	1.0	—	10.0
Ana Dabović	3	0	19.7	50.0%	71.4%	71.4%	1.7	3.7	0.3	—	11.7
Temeka Johnson	3	0	12.3	25.0%	0.0%	0.0%	2.0	1.7	0.7	—	1.3

== Awards and honors ==
Recipient	Award	Date awarded	Ref.
Jantel Lavender	All-Star Injury Replacement	July 5	
Nneka Ogwumike	Western Conference Player of the Week	July 5	
Nneka Ogwumike	WNBA All-Defensive First Team	September 27	
Candace Parker	Western Conference Player of the Week	August 24	
Candace Parker	Western Conference Player of the Week	September 8	
Candace Parker	Western Conference Player of the Month – August	September 3	
Candace Parker	All-WNBA Second Team	October 8	
Ana Dabović	WNBA All-Rookie Team	September 24	
