= Andrea Hoover =

American basketball player (born 1992)

Personal information
- Born: September 9, 1992 (age 34) Bellbrook, Ohio
- Listed height: 5 ft 9 in (1.75 m)
- Listed weight: 155 lb (70 kg)

Career information
- High school: Spring Valley (Centerville, Ohio)
- College: Dayton (2011–2015)
- WNBA draft: 2015: 3rd round, 31st overall pick
- Drafted by: Los Angeles Sparks
- Playing career: 2015–present
- Position: Guard
- Number: 24

Career history
- 2015: Los Angeles Sparks

Career highlights
- Atlantic 10 Player of the Year (2014); 3x First-team All-Atlantic 10 (2013–2015); Atlantic 10 Freshman of the Year (2012); Atlantic 10 All-Freshman Team (2012)
- Stats at WNBA.com
- Stats at Basketball Reference

Andrea Hoover Holder (born September 9, 1992) is an American professional women's basketball guard formerly with the Los Angeles Sparks of the WNBA and the Dayton Flyers at the University of Dayton.

Hoover appeared in 12 games, including one start, with the Sparks during the 2015 season. She averaged 14.3 minutes and 3.8 points per game.

== High school career ==
Hoover played for Spring Valley Academy. In her junior year, she averaged 17.0 points, 8.5 rebounds, 7.5 steals and 4.0 assists, and was also named to the ESPNU Class of 2011 Super 60 Players.

Hoover had offers from Stanford and North Carolina State. However, most schools did not know about her, since Spring Valley Academy was not a part of the Ohio High School Athletic Association. With Dayton recruiting her since her junior year, she decided to play for them. Dayton also recruited Ally Malott. Together, they would end up as one of the best duos in Dayton basketball's history.

== College career ==
Hoover and Malott were the only freshmen on a mostly senior-laden Dayton team for the 2011–12 season. In the Atlantic 10 semifinals, Hoover grabbed a key defensive rebound and made two clutch free throws to hold off Temple. Dayton went on to win the Atlantic 10 tournament championship. With averages of 10.3 points (second on the team), 5.2 rebounds, and 1.9 rebounds, she was selected as the Atlantic 10 Freshman of the Year. She and Malott made the Atlantic 10 All-Freshman Team.

Hoover became the team's leading scorer in her sophomore season with 12.2 points per game. She was named to the First-Team all-conference and was also named to the All-Academic Team. With a perfect 14–0 conference record, she helped earned the program’s first regular season Atlantic 10 championship title. They finished the 2012–13 season with a record of 28–3.

In her junior season, Hoover became the co-captain of the team. She was the Atlantic 10 Women's Basketball Player of the Year as a junior, leading the Flyers to a second straight A-10 regular season title.

In her senior season, Hoover was one of 50 players in women’s college basketball to be named to the Naismith Trophy Watch List. She and Malott were also selected as nominees for the 2015 Senior CLASS Award. In a win over St. Joseph, she broke the program's all-time career made three pointers. That year, Dayton advanced to the Elite Eight, where they lost to UConn in a close match. She finished her last season with averages of 17.4 points per game and also led the team in three point percentage. She was named as the A-10 Scholar-Athlete of the Year.

Hoover finished fourth in career scoring with 1,848 points a game for Dayton, with career averages of 14.6 points and 5.6 rebounds a game. She also has the best career rebounding average of any guard in the program's history and holds the single-season record for free throw percentage (93.6%). Alongside Malott, they appeared in four straight NCAA tournaments. In 2022, Hoover and Malott were inducted into Dayton’s Athletics Hall of Fame.

== Professional career ==
=== Los Angeles Sparks ===
Hoover was selected 31st overall by the Los Angeles Sparks in the 2015 WNBA draft. Along with Ally Malott (who was selected earlier at eighth by the Washington Mystics), they became the first women's players from Dayton to be drafted into the WNBA.

Hoover only played one season with the Sparks, playing in 12 games before getting cut after the All-Star Game. Instead of playing overseas, she decided to return home to Bellbrook.

== Personal life ==
Hoover is married to Jake Holder. They have three daughters. She currently works as a cost/price analyst at Wright Patterson Air Force Base.

In 2022, Hoover was inducted into the Butler County Sports Hall of Fame alongside Ally Malott.

== Career statistics ==
Legend
GP	Games played	GS	Games started	MPG	Minutes per game	RPG	Rebounds per game
APG	Assists per game	SPG	Steals per game	BPG	Blocks per game	PPG	Points per game
TO	Turnovers per game	FG%	Field-goal percentage	3P%	3-point field-goal percentage	FT%	Free-throw percentage
**Bold**	Career best	°	League leader

=== WNBA ===
==== Regular season ====
WNBA regular season statistics
Year	Team	GP	GS	MPG	FG%	3P%	FT%	RPG	APG	SPG	BPG	TO	PPG
2015	Los Angeles	12	1	14.3	31.9	28.6	100.0	1.3	0.3	0.2	0.1	0.7	3.8
**Career**	1 year, 1 team	12	1	14.3	31.9	28.6	100.0	1.3	0.3	0.2	0.1	0.7	3.8

=== College ===
NCAA statistics
Year	Team	GP	Points	FG%	3P%	FT%	RPG	APG	SPG	BPG	PPG
2011–12	Dayton	30	300	37.3%	33.3%	77.0%	5.1	1.9	1.1	0.3	10.0
2012–13	Dayton	31	401	44.0%	40.3%	77.0%	5.5	2.2	1.3	0.1	12.9
2013–14	Dayton	31	537	**45.3%**	37.8%	**93.6%**	5.4	**3.6**	1.3	0.2	17.3
2014–15	Dayton	**35**	**610**	43.1%	**45.6%**	89.3%	**6.3**	3.2	**1.6**	**0.3**	**17.4**
**Career**		127	1848	42.9%	39.8%	85.5%	5.6	2.7	1.3	0.2	14.6
