= 2015 Chicago Sky season =

- Head coach: Pokey Chatman
- Arena: Allstate Arena

Results
- Record: 21–13 (.618)
- Place: 2nd (Eastern)
- Playoff finish: Semifinals

Media
- Television: WMEU-CD; ESPN; ESPN2; NBA TV

The 2015 Chicago Sky season was the franchise's 10th season in the Women's National Basketball Association (WNBA). The season began at home on June 5, 2015 against the Indiana Fever. The Sky won that game, but went on to lose their next two games, both on the road. Their extended road trip continued with a victory at Indiana, which they followed with a loss at Atlanta. The road trip ended with an overtime victory over San Antonio. Another overtime victory over Atlanta saw the Sky go above .500. However, they lost two of their final three games in June to finish the month 5–5. They began July with a four-game winning streak, which included two victories over Connecticut, one against Washington, and one against Minnesota. The streak was ended with a defeat against Minnesota, but the Sky rebounded with two straight victories. They closed the month with defeats against Phoenix and Los Angeles to finish the month 6–3. The team struggled to gain consistency in August as the won their first two games, but then alternated wins and losses for their next five games. The end of the month saw them defeat Washington twice and Atlanta for a three game winning streak, but it was ended with an end of month loss to Connecticut. The Sky finished the month 7–4. The Sky won their first three games in September before falling on the final day of the regular season against Connecticut.

The Sky finished the regular season 21–13, two games out of first place in the Eastern Conference. As the second seed in the East, they faced third seed Indiana in the Conference Semifinals of the 2015 WNBA Playoffs. The Sky won the first game, at home 77–72. They were defeated in game two at Indiana 82–89 to force a deciding third game in Chicago. The Sky could not translate home court advantage into a series win as they fell 100–89 to end their season. Their 21 wins were second in franchise history, only behind their 24 in 2013. Elena Delle Donne won MVP and lead the league in scoring. Courtney Vandersloot lead the league in assists, and Allie Quigley won the WNBA Sixth Woman of the Year Award.

== Transactions ==
=== WNBA draft ===
Round	Pick	Player	Nationality	School/team/country
1	5	Cheyenne Parker	United States	Middle Tennessee
2	17	Betnijah Laney	United States	Rutgers
2	22	Aleighsa Welch	United States	South Carolina

=== Trades and Roster Changes ===
Date	Transaction
January 6, 2015	Exercised 4th-Year Team Option on Elena Delle Donne
January 6, 2015	Extended Qualifying Offers to Courtney Vandersloot, Jessica Breland, Sasha Goodlett, and Courtney Clements
January 12, 2015	Cored Sylvia Fowles
February 10, 2015	Signed Courtney Vandersloot
February 11, 2015	Signed Tamera Young
February 16, 2015	Traded Epiphanny Prince to the New York Liberty in exchange for Cappie Pondexter
February 19, 2015	Signed Jessica Breland
February 23, 2015	Signed Allie Quigley
March 5, 2015	Signed Jacki Gemelos and Clarissa dos Santos to training-camp contracts
March 18, 2015	Signed Sasha Goodlett and Courtney Clements to training-camp contracts
March 23, 2015	Signed Cappie Pondexter to a Contract Extension
April 1, 2015	Waived Gennifer Brandon
April 29, 2015	Signed Cheyenne Parker and Aleighsa Welch to rookie-scale contracts
May 4, 2015	Signed Betnijah Laney and Victoria Macaulay to rookie-scale contracts
May 20, 2015	Waived Aleighsa Welch
May 31, 2015	Waived Courtney Clements
June 4, 2015	Waived Markeisha Gatling and Jacki Gemelos
June 7, 2015	Temporarily Suspended Allie Quigley due to Overseas Commitments
June 17, 2015	Activate Allie Quigley from her Temporary Suspension
June 17, 2015	Waived Victoria Macaulay
June 17, 2015	Signed Jacki Gemelos
June 26, 2015	Waived Sasha Goodlett
June 26, 2015	Traded Sylvia Fowles and a Second Round Pick in the 2016 WNBA draft to the Minnesota Lynx in exchange for Erika de Souza from the Atlanta Dream as part of a 3-Team Trade

== Roster ==
2015 Chicago Sky roster
Players
Coaches

Pos.	No.	Nat.	Name	Height	Weight	DOB	From	Yrs
F	51	(United States)	Breland, Jessica	6' 3" (1.91m)	170 lb (77kg)	February 23, 1988 (aged 27)	North Carolina	4
F/C	41	(Brazil)	de Souza, Érika	6' 5" (1.96m)	190 lb (86kg)	March 3, 1982 (aged 33)	Brazil	9
G/F	11	(United States)	Delle Donne, Elena	6' 5" (1.96m)	188 lb (85kg)	September 5, 1989 (aged 25)	Delaware	3
C	8	(Brazil)	dos Santos, Clarissa	6' 1" (1.85m)	180 lb (82kg)	March 10, 1988 (aged 27)	Brazil	R
G	21	(United States)	Faulkner, Jamierra	5' 6" (1.68m)	141 lb (64kg)	March 9, 1992 (aged 23)	Southern Miss	2
G	5	(United States)	Gemelos, Jacki	6' 0" (1.83m)	165 lb (75kg)	November 22, 1988 (aged 26)	USC	R
G/F	44	(United States)	Laney, Betnijah	6' 0" (1.83m)	160 lb (73kg)	October 29, 1993 (aged 21)	Rutgers	R
F	32	(United States)	Parker, Cheyenne	6' 4" (1.93m)	190 lb (86kg)	August 22, 1992 (aged 22)	Middle Tennessee	R
G	23	(United States)	Pondexter, Cappie	5' 9" (1.75m)	160 lb (73kg)	January 7, 1983 (aged 32)	Rutgers	10
G	14	(United States)	Quigley, Allie	5' 10" (1.78m)	140 lb (64kg)	June 20, 1986 (aged 28)	DePaul	7
G	22	(United States)	Vandersloot, Courtney	5' 8" (1.73m)	132 lb (60kg)	February 8, 1989 (aged 26)	Gonzaga	5
F	1	(United States)	Young, Tamera	6' 2" (1.88m)	172 lb (78kg)	October 30, 1986 (aged 28)	James Madison	8

Head coach
(United States) Pokey Chatman (LSU)
Assistant coaches
(United States) Tree Rollins (Clemson)
(United States) Christie Sides (Louisiana Tech)
Athletic trainer
(United States) Heidi Wlezien
Strength and conditioning coach
(United States) Ann Crosby (Western Michigan)

Legend

- (C) Team captain
- (DP) Unsigned draft pick
- (FA) Free agent
- (S) Suspended
- Injured

=== Depth ===
Pos.	Starter	Bench
C	Erika de Souza	Clarissa dos Santos
PF	Jessica Breland	Cheyenne Parker
SF	Elena Delle Donne	Tamera Young; Betnijah Laney
SG	Cappie Pondexter	Allie Quigley; Jacki Gemelos
PG	Courtney Vandersloot	Jamierra Faulkner

== Schedule ==
=== Preseason ===
2015 Preseason Schedule
Total: 2–1 (Home: 1–0; Road: 1–1)

Game	Date	Opponent	Score	High points	High rebounds	High assists	Location/Attendance	Record
1	May 22	New York	W 55–83	Elena Delle Donne (16)	Delle Donne dos Santos (8)	Allie Quigley (4)	Bob Carpenter Center; 3,105	1–0
2	May 27	Los Angeles	L 76–67	Courtney Vandersloot (15)	Tamera Young (6)	Cappie Pondexter (6)	Mohegan Sun Arena; 3,947	1–1
3	May 28	China	W 59–92	Elena Delle Donne (18)	Cheyenne Parker (6)	Vandersloot; Gemelos (3)	Mohegan Sun Arena	2–1

2015 pre-season schedule

=== Regular season ===
2015 Regular Season Schedule
Total: 21–13 (Home: 13–4; Road: 8–9)
June: 5–5 (Home: 2–1; Road: 3–4)

Game	Date	Opponent	Score	High points	High rebounds	High assists	Location/Attendance	Record
1	June 5	New York	W 95–72	Elena Delle Donne (31)	Jessica Breland (13)	Allie Quigley (5)	Allstate Arena; 8,123	1–0
2	June 6	@ Tulsa	L 93–101	Elena Delle Donne (40)	Delle Donne (9)	Courtney Vandersloot (6)	BOK Center; 7,256	1–1
3	June 11	@ Connecticut	L 65–67	Elena Delle Donne (27)	Pondexter; Laney (8)	Courtney Vandersloot (4)	Mohegan Sun Arena; 4,523	1–2
4	June 14	@ Indiana	W 98–72	Elena Delle Donne (24)	Elena Delle Donne (9)	Vandersloot; Pondexter (4)	Bankers Life Fieldhouse; 6,433	2–2
5	June 19	@ Atlanta	L 73–74	Elena Delle Donne (26)	Delle Donne dos Santos (10)	Elena Delle Donne (3)	Philips Arena; 5,166	2–3
6	June 20	@ San Antonio	W 95–87 OT	Elena Delle Donne (28)	Elena Delle Donne (13)	Courtney Vandersloot (8)	Freeman Coliseum; 4,026	3–3
7	June 24	Atlanta	W 100–96 OT	Elena Delle Donne (45)	Elena Delle Donne (11)	Courtney Vandersloot (5)	Allstate Arena; 9,893	4–3
8	June 26	@ Indiana	W 83–77	Cappie Pondexter (23)	Elena Delle Donne (14)	Courtney Vandersloot (7)	Bankers Life Fieldhouse; 6,889	5–3
9	June 28	@ Washington	L 71–86	Elena Delle Donne (26)	Elena Delle Donne (7)	Courtney Vandersloot (4)	Verizon Center; 7,400	5–4
10	June 30	New York	L 81–89	Elena Delle Donne (26)	Elena Delle Donne (13)	Courtney Vandersloot (10)	Allstate Arena; 5,048	5–5

July: 6–3 (Home: 5–1; Road: 1–2)

Game	Date	Opponent	Score	High points	High rebounds	High assists	Location/Attendance	Record
11	July 2	@ Connecticut	W 77–74	Allie Quigley (19)	Elena Delle Donne (10)	Cappie Pondexter (4)	Mohegan Sun Arena; 5,607	6–5
12	July 10	Minnesota	W 90–83	Delle Donne; Pondexter (24)	Breland; Delle Donne (10)	Faulkner (6)	Allstate Arena; 6,709	7–5
13	July 12	Connecticut	W 96–76	Cappie Pondexter (29)	Elena Delle Donne (8)	Cappie Pondexter (7)	Allstate Arena; 5,051	8–5
14	July 15	Washington	W 75–57	Allie Quigley (15)	Elena Delle Donne (10)	Jamierra Faulkner (5)	Allstate Arena; 16,304	9–5
15	July 17	@ Minnesota	L 66–84	Jessica Breland (17)	Clarissa dos Santos (13)	Courtney Vandersloot (5)	Target Center; 9,033	9–6
16	July 19	San Antonio	W 93–82	Elena Delle Donne (29)	Elena Delle Donne (13)	Courtney Vandersloot (8)	Allstate Arena; 5,011	10–6
17	July 21	Atlanta	W 97–92	Elena Delle Donne (27)	Elena Delle Donne (8)	Courtney Vandersloot (4)	Allstate Arena; 5,967	11–6
18	July 28	@ Phoenix	L 87–89 OT	Elena Delle Donne (32)	Clarissa dos Santos (8)	Courtney Vandersloot (6)	US Airways Center; 10,707	11–7
19	July 31	Los Angeles	L 77–88	Delle Donne (21)	Breland (7)	Vandersloot (13)	Allstate Arena; 7,014	11–8

August: 7–4 (Home: 4–2; Road: 3–2)

Game	Date	Opponent	Score	High points	High rebounds	High assists	Location/Attendance	Record
20	August 2	Washington	W 69–68	Elena Delle Donne (22)	de Souza (10)	Courtney Vandersloot (10)	Allstate Arena; 4,141	12–8
21	August 4	Indiana	W 106–82	Elena Delle Donne (19)	Delle Donne; Pondexter; Young (6)	Courtney Vandersloot (7)	Allstate Arena; 4,979	13–8
22	August 7	New York	L 63–77	Elena Delle Donne (17)	Elena Delle Donne (6)	Vandersloot; Quigley (2)	Allstate Arena; 5,992	13–9
23	August 9	Phoenix	W 74–64	Elena Delle Donne (33)	Jessica Breland (13)	Courtney Vandersloot (7)	Allstate Arena; 7,181	14–9
24	August 11	@ New York	L 63–84	Cappie Pondexter (23)	Jessica Breland (7)	Courtney Vandersloot (9)	Madison Square Garden; 9,987	14–10
25	August 14	@ Seattle	W 94–84	Delle Donne; Vandersloot (21)	Jessica Breland (11)	Courtney Vandersloot (8)	Key Arena; 5,684	15–10
26	August 16	@ Los Angeles	L 64–76	Elena Delle Donne (23)	Delle Donne de Souza (8)	Courtney Vandersloot (4)	Staples Center; 7,110	15–11
27	August 21	Washington	W 87–85	Elena Delle Donne (22)	Delle Donne; Vandersloot dos Santos (8)	Courtney Vandersloot (10)	Allstate Arena; 5,861	16–11
28	August 23	@ Washington	W 66–64	Elena Delle Donne (18)	Elena Delle Donne (10)	Breland; Vandersloot (2)	Verizon Center; 7,400	17–11
29	August 29	@ Atlanta	W 98–96	Cappie Pondexter (22)	Erika de Souza (7)	Courtney Vandersloot (7)	Philips Arena; 6,872	18–11
30	August 30	Connecticut	L 68–72	Cappie Pondexter (18)	Jessica Breland (7)	Courtney Vandersloot (5)	Allstate Arena; 5,969	18–12

September: 3–1 (Home: 2–0; Road: 1–1)

Game	Date	Opponent	Score	High points	High rebounds	High assists	Location/Attendance	Record
31	September 3	@ New York	W 82–60	Courtney Vandersloot (21)	Breland de Souza (8)	Courtney Vandersloot (5)	Madison Square Garden; 8,496	19–12
32	September 6	Seattle	W 93–65	Allie Quigley (17)	Erika de Souza (8)	Vandersloot; Faulkner (6)	Allstate Arena; 6,205	20–12
33	September 11	Tulsa	W 92–71	Elena Delle Donne (21)	Young; Parker (5)	Courtney Vandersloot (9)	Allstate Arena; 7,753	21–12
34	September 13	@ Connecticut	L 75–86	Elena Delle Donne (28)	Erika de Souza (9)	Tamera Young (4)	Mohegan Sun Arena; 8,049	21–13

2015 season schedule

=== Playoffs ===
2015 Playoff Schedule
Eastern Conference Semifinals vs. Indiana (Lost Series 1-2)

Game	Date	Opponent	Score	High points	High rebounds	High assists	Location/Attendance	Record
1	September 17	Indiana	W 77–72	Courtney Vandersloot (17)	Elena Delle Donne (11)	Quigley; Vandersloot (5)	UIC Pavilion; 4,098	1–0
2	September 19	@ Indiana	L 82–89	Courtney Vandersloot (19)	Erika de Souza (8)	Courtney Vandersloot (6)	Bankers Life Fieldhouse; 7,124	1–1
3	September 21	Indiana	L 89–100	Elena Delle Donne (40)	Jessica Breland (8)	Courtney Vandersloot (14)	Allstate Arena; 2,882	1–2

2015 playoff schedule

== Standings ==
Eastern Conference	W	L	PCT	GB	Home	Road	Conf.
x - New York Liberty	23	11	.676	–	12–5	11–6	13–9
x - Chicago Sky	21	13	.618	2	13–4	8–9	14–8
x - Indiana Fever	20	14	.588	3	11–6	9–8	13–9
x - Washington Mystics	18	16	.529	5	11–6	7–10	10–12
e - Atlanta Dream	15	19	.441	8	9–8	6–11	10–12
e - Connecticut Sun	15	19	.441	8	8–9	7–10	6–16

Notes

x – Clinched playoff spot
e – Eliminated from playoffs

== Playoffs ==
**Conference semifinals** Best-of-3
E1	**New York**	**2**
E4	Washington	1
**Eastern Conference**
E2	Chicago	1
E3	**Indiana**	**2**
W1	**Minnesota**	**2**
W4	Los Angeles	1
**Western Conference**
W2	**Phoenix**	**2**
W3	Tulsa	0

**Conference finals** Best-of-3
E1	New York	1
E3	**Indiana**	**2**
W1	**Minnesota**	**2**
W2	Phoenix	0

**WNBA Finals**; Best-of-5
E3	Indiana	2
W1	**Minnesota**	**3**

- **Bold** – Series winner
- Italics – Team with home-court advantage

== Statistics ==
Legend
GP	Games played	GS	Games started	MPG	Minutes per game	RPG	Rebounds per game
APG	Assists per game	SPG	Steals per game	BPG	Blocks per game	PPG	Points per game
FG%	Field-goal percentage	3P%	3-point field-goal percentage	FT%	Free-throw percentage	TO	Turnovers per game
PF	Fouls per game		Team leader		League leader

=== Regular season ===
Player	GP	GS	MPG	FG%	3P%	FT%	RPG	APG	SPG	BPG	PPG
Elena Delle Donne	31	31	33.3	46.0	31.3	95.0	8.4	1.4	1.1	2.0	23.4
Cappie Pondexter	29	29	30.2	43.9	38.1	82.4	3.9	2.1	1.0	0.2	15.0
Courtney Vandersloot	34	34	29.9	46.3	35.6	90.1	3.4	5.8	1.3	0.5	11.4
Allie Quigley	32	7	22.5	43.1	34.0	82.6	1.8	1.7	0.4	0.5	11.1
Jessica Breland	33	30	21.4	47.1	0.0	77.4	5.9	1.3	0.7	1.1	6.7
Erika de Souza	17	15	19.4	49.4	0.0	47.6	5.5	0.5	0.5	0.8	5.5
Clarissa dos Santos	31	7	17.5	46.1	0.0	68.8	4.6	0.7	0.6	0.6	5.3
Tamera Young	19	10	17.1	39.2	0.0	82.8	2.9	1.3	0.6	0.4	4.5
Jamierra Faulkner	33	0	9.6	41.4	18.2	80.8	1.0	1.7	0.4	0.2	4.1
Betnijah Laney	32	2	12.8	39.4	0.0	69.6	2.1	0.6	0.5	0.2	2.9
Cheyenne Parker	30	0	9.3	40.0	0.0	38.5	2.5	0.2	0.2	0.7	2.2
Sasha Goodlett	16	5	13.1	53.8	0.0	85.7	1.9	0.3	0.2	0.6	2.1
Jacki Gemelos	17	0	5.0	40.0	30.0	0.0	0.5	0.4	0.3	0.1	1.1
Victoria Macaulay	4	0	6.3	28.6	0.0	0.0	1.0	0.0	0.5	0.3	1.0

=== Playoffs ===
Player	GP	GS	MPG	FG%	3P%	FT%	RPG	APG	SPG	BPG	PPG
Elena Delle Donne	3	3	36.3	50.0	43.8	100.0	6.3	2.0	0.7	1.0	21.7
Allie Quigley	3	0	27.0	59.0	43.8	100.0	2.3	2.7	0.0	0.0	18.0
Courtney Vandersloot	3	3	31.7	50.0	50.0	100.0	4.7	8.3	0.3	1.0	13.7
Jessica Breland	3	3	28.3	52.0	0.0	100.0	7.7	1.3	1.3	2.3	10.0
Erika de Souza	3	3	22.7	56.3	0.0	100.0	4.7	0.7	0.7	0.3	7.0
Cappie Pondexter	3	1	22.3	30.8	0.0	100.0	1.0	1.3	0.7	0.0	6.0
Clarissa dos Santos	3	0	7.0	50.0	0.0	33.3	2.0	0.3	0.7	0.7	2.0
Cheyenne Parker	2	0	7.0	66.7	0.0	0.0	1.5	0.0	0.0	0.0	2.0
Jamierra Faulkner	3	0	6.0	16.7	0.0	50.0	1.0	1.7	0.0	0.0	1.7
Tamera Young	3	2	12.7	25.0	0.0	0.0	3.0	1.7	0.3	0.3	1.3
Betnijah Laney	1	0	2.0	0.0	0.0	0.0	0.0	0.0	0.0	0.0	0.0

== Awards and honors ==
Recipient	Award	Date awarded	Ref.
Elena Delle Donne	Eastern Conference Player of the Week	June 15	
Elena Delle Donne	Eastern Conference Player of the Week	June 23	
Elena Delle Donne	Eastern Conference Player of the Week	June 30	
Elena Delle Donne	Eastern Conference Player of the Week	August 10	
Elena Delle Donne	Eastern Conference Player of the Week	August 24	
Elena Delle Donne	Eastern Conference Player of the Month - June	July 6	
Elena Delle Donne	WNBA All-Star Starter	July 14	
Elena Delle Donne	WNBA MVP	September 16	
Elena Delle Donne	Peak Performer: Points	September 17	
Elena Delle Donne	All-WNBA First Team	October 8	
Cappie Pondexter	Eastern Conference Player of the Week	July 13	
Cappie Pondexter	WNBA All-Star Selection	July 21	
Courtney Vandersloot	Eastern Conference Player of the Week	September 8	
Courtney Vandersloot	Peak Performer: Assists	September 17	
Courtney Vandersloot	All-WNBA Second Team	October 8	
Allie Quigley	WNBA Sixth Woman of the Year	September 17	
