= 2015 Atlanta Dream season =

- Head coach: Michael Cooper
- Arena: Philips Arena

Results
- Record: 15–19 (.441)
- Place: 5th (Eastern)
- Playoff finish: Did not qualify

The 2015 Atlanta Dream season was the 8th season for the Atlanta Dream of the Women's National Basketball Association, and their 2nd season under head coach, Michael Cooper. The team missed the playoffs for the first time since the 2008 season. The Dream opened their season up against the New York Liberty on June 5, 2015, with an 82–73 loss.

== Transactions ==
=== WNBA draft ===
Round	Pick	Player	Nationality	School/team/country
1	9	Samantha Logic	United States	Iowa
3	29	Ariel Massengale	United States	Tennessee
3	34	Lauren Okafor	United States	James Madison

=== Trades and Roster Changes ===
Date	Transaction
January 12, 2015	Extended Qualifying Offers to Nadia Colhado, Aneika Henry-Morello, Jasmine Thomas, and Amanda Thompson
January 15, 2015	Cored Erika de Souza
February 23, 2015	Signed Erika de Souza
February 24, 2015	Signed Sequoia Holmes, Ify Ibekwe, and Nadia Colhado to training-camp contracts
February 24, 2015	Signed Roneeka Hodges
March 19, 2015	Signed Jasmine Thomas to Multi-Year Deal
April 16, 2015	Traded Jasmine Thomas to the Connecticut Sun for the draft rights to Brittany Hrynko
April 20, 2015	Signed Monique Oliver and Chucky Jeffery to training-camp contracts
April 21, 2015	Signed Aneika Henry-Morello
April 22, 2015	Signed Samantha Logic to a rookie-scale contract
April 23, 2015	Signed Lauren Okafor to a rookie-scale contract
May 6, 2015	Signed Matee Ajavon
May 6, 2015	Signed Martha Alwal to a training-camp contract
May 14, 2015	Signed Brittany Hrynko to a rookie-scale contract
May 19, 2015	Waived Brittany Hrynko
May 19, 2015	Full Season Suspend Celine Dumerc
May 24, 2015	Waived Monique Oliver, Chucky Jeffery, and Lauren Okafor
May 25, 2015	Signed Erica Wheeler to a training-camp contract
May 29, 2015	Waived Ify Ibekwe
June 1, 2015	Waived Martha Alwal and Sequoia Holmes
June 14, 2015	Temporarily Suspend Aneika Henry-Morello and Tiffany Hayes due to Overseas Commitment
June 17, 2015	Signed Cierra Burdick and Sydney Carter
July 3, 2015	Waived Nadia Colhado
July 4, 2015	Activated Tiffany Hayes from her Temporary Suspension
July 5, 2015	Traded Samantha Logic to the San Antonio Stars in exchange for a 2nd round pick in the 2016 WNBA draft
July 5, 2015	Activated Aneika Henry-Morello from her Temporary Suspension
July 22, 2015	Waived Erica Wheeler
July 26, 2015	Traded Erika de Souza to the Chicago Sky in exchange for Damiris Dantas and Reshanda Gray from the Minnesota Lynx in a 3-Team Deal.
September 11, 2015	Signed Carla Cortijo to a Hardship Contract

== Roster ==
2015 Atlanta Dream roster
Players
Coaches

Pos.	No.	Nat.	Name	Height	Weight	From
G	10	(United States)	Ajavon, Matee	5' 8" (1.73m)	160 lb (73kg)	Rutgers
F	11	(United States)	Burdick, Cierra	6' 2" (1.88m)	172 lb (78kg)	Tennessee
G	4	(United States)	Carter, Sydney	5' 6" (1.68m)	133 lb (60kg)	Texas A&M
G	8	(Puerto Rico)	Cortijo, Carla	5' 8" (1.73m)	135 lb (61kg)	Texas
F	12	(Brazil)	Dantas, Damiris	6' 3" (1.91m)	201 lb (91kg)	Brazil
F	21	(United States)	Gray, Reshanda	6' 2" (1.88m)	192 lb (87kg)	California
G	15	(United States)	Hayes, Tiffany	5' 10" (1.78m)	135 lb (61kg)	Connecticut
F/C	13	(Jamaica)	Henry-Morello, Aneika	6' 4" (1.93m)	192 lb (87kg)	Florida
G	5	(United States)	Hodges, Roneeka	5' 11" (1.8m)	165 lb (75kg)	Florida State
F	20	(Spain)	Lyttle, Sancho	6' 5" (1.96m)	175 lb (79kg)	Houston
G/F	35	(United States)	McCoughtry, Angel	6' 1" (1.85m)	173 lb (78kg)	Louisville
F	1	(United States)	Milton-Jones, Delisha	6' 1" (1.85m)	185 lb (84kg)	Florida
G	23	(United States)	Schimmel, Shoni	5' 9" (1.75m)	161 lb (73kg)	Louisville

Head coach
(United States) Michael Cooper (New Mexico)
Assistant coaches
(United States) Karleen Thompson (USC)
(United States) Tellis Frank (Western Kentucky)

Legend

- (C) Team captain
- (DP) Unsigned draft pick
- (FA) Free agent
- (S) Suspended
- Injured

=== Depth ===
Pos.	Starter	Bench
C	Damiris Dantas	Aneika Henry-Morello
PF	Sancho Lyttle	Delisha Milton-Jones; Reshanda Gray
SF	Angel McCoughtry	Roneeka Hodges; Cierra Burdick
SG	Tiffany Hayes	Matee Ajavon
PG	Shoni Schimmel	Sydney Carter; Carla Cortijo

== Schedule ==
=== Preseason ===
2015 Preseason Schedule
Total: 1–1 (Home: 0–1; Road: 1–0)

1	May 23	Washington	L 55-79	McCoughtry; Alwal (10)	Aneika Henry-Morello (9)	Shoni Schimmel (6)	KFC Yum! Center; 6,347	0–1
2	May 27	@ New York	W 85-72	McCoughtry; Wheeler (13)	Érika de Souza (10)	Erica Wheeler (4)	Madison Square Garden; 14,530	1–1

2015 season schedule

=== Regular season ===
2015 Regular Season Schedule
Total: 15-19 (Home: 9–8; Road: 6–11)
June: 4–6 (Home: 3–3; Road: 1–3)

Game	Date	Opponent	Score	High points	High rebounds	High assists	Location/Attendance	Record
1	June 5	@ New York	L 73-82	Angel McCoughtry (27)	McCoughtry; Schimmel (8)	Shoni Schimmel (4)	Madison Square Garden; 8,910	0–1
2	June 7	Connecticut	L 70-75	Sancho Lyttle (16)	Sancho Lyttle (14)	Shoni Schimmel (3)	Philips Arena; 8,350	0–2
3	June 11	San Antonio	W 72-69	Angel McCoughtry (21)	Sancho Lyttle (10)	Shoni Schimmel (3)	Philips Arena; 4,308	1–2
4	June 12	@ Washington	W 64-61	Angel McCoughtry (21)	Lyttle de Souza (6)	Schimmel; McCoughtry; Ajavon (3)	Philips Arena; 7,248	2–2
5	June 14	@ Connecticut	L 64-82	Angel McCoughtry (24)	Sancho Lyttle (10)	Lyttle; Wheeler (4)	Mohegan Sun Arena; 5,520	2–3
6	June 16	Indiana	L 79-90	Sancho Lyttle (19)	Erika de Souza (9)	McCoughtry de Souza (4)	Philips Arena; 9,814	2–4
7	June 19	Chicago	W 74-73	Angel McCoughtry (18)	Erika de Souza (11)	Angel McCoughtry (6)	Philips Arena; 5,166	3–4
8	June 21	New York	L 64-73	Angel McCoughtry (17)	Erika de Souza (9)	Angel McCoughtry (4)	Philips Arena; 5,805	3–5
9	June 24	@ Chicago	L 96-100 OT	Angel McCoughtry (34)	Lyttle; McCoughtry (10)	McCoughtry; Ajavon (6)	Allstate Arena; 9,893	3–6
10	June 26	Washington	W 72-69	Angel McCoughtry (18)	Sancho Lyttle (10)	Matee Ajavon (4)	Philips Arena; 5,861	4–6

July: 3–6 (Home: 2–1; Road: 1–5)

Game	Date	Opponent	Score	High points	High rebounds	High assists	Location/Attendance	Record
11	July 5	Seattle	W 72-64	Angel McCoughtry (23)	Sancho Lyttle (15)	McCoughtry; Hayes(4)	Philips Arena; 5,385	5–6
12	July 7	Tulsa	L 75-85	Angel McCoughtry (25)	Sancho Lyttle (13)	Matee Ajavon (4)	Philips Arena; 6,744	5–7
13	July 12	New York	W 84-76	Angel McCoughtry (32)	Erika de Souza (8)	Angel McCoughtry (6)	Philips Arena; 6,028	6–7
14	July 14	@ Phoenix	L 71-80	Tiffany Hayes (19)	Cierra Burdick (8)	Cierra Burdick (6)	US Airways Center; 10,472	6–8
15	July 16	@ Los Angeles	W 76-72	Angel McCoughtry (22)	Erika de Souza (8)	McCoughtry; Wheeler (3)	STAPLES Center; 12,567	7–8
16	July 18	@ Seattle	L 73-86	Angel McCoughtry (16)	de Souza; Milton-Jones (5)	Shoni Schimmel (3)	KeyArena; 9,686	7–9
17	July 21	@ Chicago	L 92-97	Tiffany Hayes (19)	Erika de Souza (9)	Angel McCoughtry (6)	Allstate Arena; 5,967	7–10
18	July 29	@ San Antonio	L 85-102	Angel McCoughtry (14)	Aneika Henry-Morello (9)	Shoni Schimmel (7)	Freeman Coliseum; 3,613	7–11
19	July 31	@ Minnesota	L 70-86	Tiffany Hayes (15)	Aneika Henry-Morello (8)	Shoni Schimmel (10)	Target Center; 9,134	7–12

August: 5–5 (Home: 2–3; Road: 3–2)

Game	Date	Opponent	Score	High points	High rebounds	High assists	Location/Attendance	Record
20	August 2	Phoenix	L 68-71	Angel McCoughtry (16)	Henry-Morello; Dantas (9)	Roneeka Hodges (4)	Philips Arena; 7,352	7–13
21	August 7	@ Indiana	L 77-106	Angel McCoughtry (23)	Aneika Henry-Morello (7)	Schimmel; McCoughtry (3)	Bankers Life Fieldhouse; 7,869	7–14
22	August 9	@ Tulsa	W 98-90	Angel McCoughtry (23)	Angel McCoughtry (9)	Hayes; McCoughtry (4)	BOK Center; 5,345	8–14
23	August 14	Minnesota	L 82-84	Angel McCoughtry (32)	Dantas; Gray (8)	Shoni Schimmel (8)	Philips Arena; 5,890	8–15
24	August 16	Connecticut	W 90-77	McCoughtry; Gray (18)	Sancho Lyttle (7)	Matee Ajavon (7)	Philips Arena; 5,661	9–15
25	August 21	@ New York	L 67-78	Tiffany Hayes (17)	Sancho Lyttle (8)	Shoni Schimmel (4)	Madison Square Garden; 9,303	9–16
26	August 23	@ Connecticut	W 102-92	Angel McCoughtry (33)	Angel McCoughtry (8)	Matee Ajavon (8)	Mohegan Sun Arena; 5,319	10–16
27	August 25	Connecticut	W 71-57	Sancho Lyttle (17)	Hayes; Henry-Morello (9)	Ajavon; Hayes (5)	Philips Arena; 5,573	11–16
28	August 28	@ Indiana	W 90-84	Tiffany Hayes (28)	Sancho Lyttle (8)	Ajavon; Schimmel; McCoughtry (2)	Bankers Life Fieldhouse; 7,303	12–16
29	August 29	Chicago	L 98-96	Angel McCoughtry (33)	Angel McCoughtry (11)	Sancho Lyttle (3)	Philips Arena; 6,872	12–17

September: 3–2 (Home: 2–1; Road: 1–1)

Game	Date	Opponent	Score	High points	High rebounds	High assists	Location/Attendance	Record
30	September 1	@ New York	L 75-80 OT	Angel McCoughtry (25)	Aneika Henry-Morello (9)	Tiffany Hayes (6)	Madison Square Garden; 7,482	12–18
31	September 6	@ Washington	W 73-67	Tiffany Hayes (19)	Aneika Henry-Morello; Lyttle (10)	Sancho Lyttle (6)	Philips Arena; 5,584	13–18
32	September 9	Los Angeles	W 90-60	Angel McCoughtry (23)	Damiris Dantas (12)	Schimmel; Hayes; Ajavon (5)	Philips Arena; 3,856	14–18
33	September 11	Indiana	L 67-75	Sancho Lyttle (19)	Lyttle; Aneika Henry-Morello (8)	Hayes; Lyttle (3)	Philips Arena; 5,823	14–19
34	September 13	@ Washington	W 73-71	Angel McCoughtry (24)	Sancho Lyttle (12)	Schimmel; Lyttle (3)	Verizon Center; 7,196	15–19

2015 season schedule

== Standings ==
Eastern Conference	W	L	PCT	GB	Home	Road	Conf.
x - New York Liberty	23	11	.676	–	12–5	11–6	13–9
x - Chicago Sky	21	13	.618	2	13–4	8–9	14–8
x - Indiana Fever	20	14	.588	3	11–6	9–8	13–9
x - Washington Mystics	18	16	.529	5	11–6	7–10	10–12
e - Atlanta Dream	15	19	.441	8	9–8	6–11	10–12
e - Connecticut Sun	15	19	.441	8	8–9	7–10	6–16

== Statistics ==
Legend
GP	Games played	GS	Games started	MPG	Minutes per game	RPG	Rebounds per game
APG	Assists per game	SPG	Steals per game	BPG	Blocks per game	PPG	Points per game
FG%	Field-goal percentage	3P%	3-point field-goal percentage	FT%	Free-throw percentage	TO	Turnovers per game
PF	Fouls per game		Team leader		League leader

=== Regular season ===
Player	GP	GS	MPG	FG%	3P%	FT%	RPG	APG	SPG	BPG	PPG
Angel McCoughtry	34	26	30.0	41.3	36.3	80.5	5.3	2.8	2.1	0.5	20.1
Tiffany Hayes	28	27	29.9	39.2	27.4	80.5	3.0	2.2	1.0	0.4	12.9
Sancho Lyttle	24	24	30.0	47.5	20.0	73.6	8.3	2.2	2.3	0.6	10.3
Erika de Souza	17	17	28.9	45.9	0.0	54.2	7.5	1.2	0.9	0.8	8.6
Damiris Dantas	16	16	24.8	38.3	33.3	97.3	5.4	0.7	0.9	0.6	8.6
Shoni Schimmel	32	16	19.8	37.8	38.3	85.7	2.5	3.2	0.8	0.2	7.6
Carla Cortijo	2	0	16.0	55.6	50.0	75.0	0.5	1.0	1.0	0.0	7.0
Roneeka Hodges	23	9	19.5	38.2	36.0	75.0	2.0	1.3	0.2	0.2	6.4
Matee Ajavon	33	11	17.6	40.5	16.7	82.2	2.5	2.4	1.4	0.2	5.9
Reshanda Gray	17	1	14.8	49.3	0.0	73.3	2.8	0.2	0.4	0.4	5.9
Aneika Henry-Morello	29	11	17.9	48.5	0.0	75.0	4.7	0.4	0.3	0.9	5.2
Erica Wheeler	17	0	11.9	45.7	40.0	50.0	0.9	1.5	0.5	0.0	4.5
Cierra Burdick	11	4	18.9	42.5	0.0	87.5	3.2	1.2	0.9	0.5	4.4
DeLisha Milton-Jones	18	1	8.9	34.0	10.0	55.6	1.8	0.4	0.4	0.1	2.1
Sydney Carter	26	7	11.3	20.8	16.7	80.0	0.9	1.2	0.3	0.1	2.0
Nadia Colhado	6	0	5.3	50.0	0.0	0.0	0.3	0.2	0.2	0.7	1.0
Samantha Logic	4	0	5.8	9.1	12.5	0.0	0.8	0.5	0.3	0.0	0.8

== Awards and honors ==
Recipient	Award	Date awarded	Ref.
Angel McCoughtry	All-Star Selection	July 14	
Angel McCoughtry	All-WNBA First Team	October 8	
Angel McCoughtry	All-Defensive First Team	September 27	
DeLisha Milton-Jones	Kim Perrot Sportsmanship Award	October 1	
Sancho Lyttle	All-Defensive Second Team	September 27	
Shoni Schimmel	All-Star Selection	July 14	
