= 2015 Connecticut Sun season =

- Head coach: Anne Donovan
- Arena: Mohegan Sun Arena

Results
- Record: 15–19 (.441)
- Place: T-5th (Eastern)
- Playoff finish: Did not qualify

The 2015 WNBA season was the seventeenth season for the Connecticut Sun franchise of the Women's National Basketball Association. The Sun started the season with a loss against the Washington Mystics 73–68 on June 5. After the opening night loss, the Sun went on a seven game winning streak. They defeated Atlanta and Los Angeles twice over this stretch and the run included four away wins. Their largest win of the stretch was a twenty-one point victory in Seattle. They lost to Indiana to finish the month 7–2. Their losing streak extended into June and lasted a total of six games. They lost to Chicago twice to open July and their July 12 96–76 loss was their largest of the streak. The streak ended on July 22 with a 78–77 overtime victory in Minnesota. They lost their next game against Indiana but defeated Seattle by one point to finish the month 2–6. They lost their opening game of August against Indiana, but won three of their next four games. The Sun defeated San Antonio, split a back-to-back with Washington and defeated Tulsa. The team then went on a seven-game losing streak where they lost to Atlanta three times, New York twice, Tulsa, and Phoenix. They ended the streak on August 30, with a 72–68 defeat of Chicago. The Sun finished August 4–9. They went 2–2 in September, losing to Indiana and New York while defeating San Antonio and Chicago in the final game of the season. Their final record of 15–19 saw them finish tied for fifth in the Eastern Conference. They did not qualify for the playoffs. After the season, head coach Anne Donovan resigned.

== Transactions ==
=== WNBA draft ===
Round	Pick	Player	Nationality	School/Team/Country
1	4	Elizabeth Williams	United States	Duke
2	19	Brittany Hrynko	United States	DePaul

=== Trades/Roster Changes ===
Date	Trade
January 28	The Sun acquired Renee Montgomery and the 3rd and 15th picks in the 2015 WNBA Draft in exchange for Camille Little and Shekinna Stricklen.
February 26	Signed Kayla Pedersen
April 16	The Sun acquired Jasmine Thomas in exchange for the draft rights to Brittany Hrynko.
May 13	The Sun acquired the 23rd pick in the 2016 WNBA draft in exchange for Asjha Jones.

== Roster ==
2015 Connecticut Sun roster
Players
Coaches

Pos.	No.	Nat.	Name	Height	Weight	DOB	From	Yrs
G	20	(United States)	Bentley, Alex (injured)	5' 7" (1.7m)	152 lb (69kg)	1990-10-27	Penn State	2
C	3	(United States)	Bone, Kelsey	6' 4" (1.93m)	220 lb (100kg)	1991-12-31	Texas A&M	2
G	34	(United States)	Faris, Kelly	5' 11" (1.8m)	154 lb (70kg)	1991-12-31	Connecticut	2
G	12	(United States)	Gray, Chelsea	5' 11" (1.8m)	170 lb (77kg)	1992-10-08	Duke	R
F/C	54	(United States)	Greene, Nikki	6' 4" (1.93m)	192 lb (87kg)	1990-09-06	Penn State	1
F	21	(United States)	Lacy, Jennifer	6' 3" (1.91m)	175 lb (79kg)	1983-03-21	Pepperdine	9
F	2	(United States)	Little, Camille	6' 2" (1.88m)	180 lb (82kg)	1985-01-18	North Carolina	8
F/C	13	(United States)	Ogwumike, Chiney (injured)	6' 2" (1.88m)	193 lb (88kg)	1992-03-22	Stanford	1
F	7	(United States)	Pedersen, Kayla	6' 4" (1.93m)	190 lb (86kg)	1989-04-14	Stanford	4
F	40	(United States)	Stricklen, Shekinna	6' 2" (1.88m)	230 lb (104kg)	1990-07-30	Tennessee	3
F	25	(United States)	Thomas, Alyssa	6' 2" (1.88m)	203 lb (92kg)	1992-04-12	Maryland	1
G	5	(United States)	Thomas, Jasmine	5' 9" (1.75m)	143 lb (65kg)	1989-09-30	Duke	4
F/C	1	(United States)	Williams, Elizabeth	6' 3" (1.91m)	200 lb (91kg)	1993-06-23	Duke	R

Head coach
(United States) Anne Donovan (Old Dominion)
Assistant coaches
(United States) Jennifer Gillom (Mississippi)
(United States) Steven Key (Boston University)
Athletic trainer
(United States) Jeremy Norman (Keene State)
Strength and conditioning coach
(United States) Lisa White

Legend

- (C) Team captain
- (DP) Unsigned draft pick
- (FA) Free agent
- (S) Suspended
- Injured

== Game log ==
=== Preseason ===
2015 pre-season game log
May: 2–1 (Home: 1–1; Road: 1–0)

Game	Date	Team	Score	High points	High rebounds	High assists	Location Attendance	Record
1	May 23	vs. Indiana	W 76–68	Chelsea Gray (13)	Alyssa Thomas (7)	Alyssa Thomas (7)	KFC Yum! Center; 6,437	1–0
2	May 27	China	W 86–65	Bentley, A. Thomas (18)	Kelsey Bone (7)	Alex Bentley (6)	Mohegan Sun Arena; 3,947	2–0
3	May 28	Los Angeles	L 57–64	Alex Bentley (22)	Alyssa Thomas (6)	Jasmine Thomas (5)	Mohegan Sun Arena; 4,006	2–1

2015 pre-season schedule

=== Regular season ===
2015 game log
Total: 15–19 (Home: 8–9; Road: 7–10)
June: 7–2 (Home: 3–2; Road: 4–0)

Game	Date	Team	Score	High points	High rebounds	High assists	Location Attendance	Record
1	June 5	Washington	L 68–73	Alex Bentley (17)	Alyssa Thomas (7)	Jasmine Thomas (4)	Mohegan Sun Arena; 5,846	0–1
2	June 7	@ Atlanta	W 75–70	Alex Bentley (17)	Jasmine Thomas (6)	Kelsey Bone (5)	Philips Arena; 8,358	1–1
3	June 11	Chicago	W 67–65	Alex Bentley (16)	Kelsey Bone (12)	Jasmine Thomas (4)	Mohegan Sun Arena; 4,523	2–1
4	June 14	Atlanta	W 82–64	Bone, Stricklen (18)	Camille Little (7)	Jasmine Thomas (5)	Mohegan Sun Arena; 5,520	3–1
5	June 16	@ Seattle	W 79–58	Chelsea Gray (16)	Pedersen, A. Thomas (6)	Pedersen, J. Thomas (3)	KeyArena; 4,941	4–1
6	June 19	@ Phoenix	W 90–78	Kelsey Bone (27)	Kelsey Bone (14)	Chelsea Gray (4)	US Airways Center; 8,907	5–1
7	June 21	@ Los Angeles	W 76–68	Alex Bentley (21)	Alyssa Thomas (8)	Gray, J. Thomas (3)	Staples Center; 6,875	6–1
8	June 26	Los Angeles	W 80–76	Alex Bentley (18)	Alyssa Thomas (7)	Camille Little (3)	Mohegan Sun Arena; 5,542	7–1
9	June 30	Indiana	L 84–92	Kelsey Bone (21)	A. Thomas, Little (5)	Alex Bentley (6)	Mohegan Sun Arena; 5,083	7–2

July: 2–6 (Home: 1–3; Road: 1–3)

Game	Date	Team	Score	High points	High rebounds	High assists	Location Attendance	Record
10	July 2	Chicago	L 74–77	Alex Bentley (25)	Alyssa Thomas (9)	Bentley, Little, Pedersen, J. Thomas (3)	Mohegan Sun Arena; 5,607	7–3
11	July 12	@ Chicago	L 76–96	Kelsey Bone (18)	Bone, Gray, J. Thomas, Williams (3)	Chelsea Gray (5)	Allstate Arena; 5,051	7–4
12	July 14	Minnesota	L 79–85	Alex Bentley (22)	Kelsey Bone (8)	Chelsea Gray (5)	Mohegan Sun Arena; 6,246	7–5
13	July 16	@ New York	L 57–64	Alex Bentley (15)	Bone, Little (8)	Gray, J. Thomas (4)	Madison Square Garden; 8,813	7–6
14	July 19	@ Washington	L 82–89	Kelsey Bone (24)	Alyssa Thomas (8)	Chelsea Gray (5)	Capital One Arena; 6,964	7–7
15	July 22	@ Minnesota	W 78–77 (OT)	Shekinna Stricklen (15)	Kelsey Bone (10)	Jasmine Thomas (4)	Target Center; 17,414	8–7
16	July 28	Indiana	L 73–75	Kelsey Bone (14)	Shekinna Stricklen (5)	Jasmine Thomas (5)	Mohegan Sun Arena; 4,868	8–8
17	July 31	Seattle	W 67–66	Shekinna Stricklen (15)	Elizabeth Williams (6)	Chelsea Gray (3)	Mohegan Sun Arena; 6,157	9–8

August: 4–9 (Home: 3–4; Road: 1–5)

Game	Date	Team	Score	High points	High rebounds	High assists	Location Attendance	Record
18	August 2	@ Indiana	L 70–83	Kelsey Bone (20)	Elizabeth Williams (6)	Jasmine Thomas (4)	Bankers Life Fieldhouse; 6,601	9–9
19	August 4	San Antonio	W 82–51	Kelsey Bone (17)	Kelsey Bone (10)	Chelsea Gray (7)	Mohegan Sun Arena; 4,490	10–9
20	August 7	Washington	W 86–72	Alex Bentley (31)	Kelsey Bone (9)	Jasmine Thomas (8)	Mohegan Sun Arena; 5,663	11–9
21	August 9	@ Washington	L 73–84	Kelsey Bone (19)	Alyssa Thomas (11)	Kayla Pedersen (4)	Capital One Arena; 7,400	11–10
22	August 12	Tulsa	W 80–74	Alex Bentley (25)	Kelsey Bone (10)	Jasmine Thomas (5)	Mohegan Sun Arena; 4,682	12–10
23	August 14	New York	L 78–90	Alex Bentley (19)	Kelsey Bone (7)	Bentley, J. Thomas (5)	Mohegan Sun Arena; 5,827	12–11
24	August 16	@ Atlanta	L 77–90	Jennifer Lacy (21)	Camille Little (10)	Jasmine Thomas (4)	Philips Arena; 5,661	12–12
25	August 21	@ Tulsa	L 76–84	Jennifer Lacy (20)	Jasmine Thomas (8)	Jasmine Thomas (5)	BOK Center; 4,225	12–13
26	August 23	Atlanta	L 92–102	Jennifer Lacy (25)	Jennifer Lacy (7)	Bone, J. Thomas (4)	Mohegan Sun Arena; 5,319	12–14
27	August 25	@ Atlanta	L 57–71	Shekinna Stricklen (14)	Chelsea Gray (6)	Chelsea Gray (4)	Philips Arena; 5,573	12–15
28	August 27	Phoenix	L 80–81	Jasmine Thomas (21)	Kelsey Bone (7)	Camille Little (5)	Mohegan Sun Arena; 5,171	12–16
29	August 29	New York	L 66–80	Kelsey Bone (22)	Kelsey Bone (7)	Jasmine Thomas (4)	Mohegan Sun Arena; 5,874	12–17
30	August 30	@ Chicago	W 72–68	Kelsey Bone (25)	Chelsea Gray (9)	Chelsea Gray (6)	Allstate Arena; 5,969	13–17

September: 2–2 (Home: 1–0; Road: 1–2)

Game	Date	Team	Score	High points	High rebounds	High assists	Location Attendance	Record
31	September 1	@ Indiana	L 51–81	Kelsey Bone (17)	Jasmine Thomas (5)	Bone, Faris, Gray (3)	Bankers Life Fieldhouse; 5,768	13–18
32	September 4	@ San Antonio	W 73–72	Kelsey Bone (17)	Kelsey Bone (8)	Jasmine Thomas (8)	Freeman Coliseum; 4,633	14–18
33	September 9	@ New York	L 64–74	Kelsey Bone (19)	Kelsey Bone (10)	Jasmine Thomas (4)	Madison Square Garden; 7,898	14–19
34	September 13	Chicago	W 86–75	Kelsey Bone (31)	Alyssa Thomas (9)	Jasmine Thomas (7)	Mohegan Sun Arena; 8,049	15–19

2015 season schedule

== Standings ==
Eastern Conference	W	L	PCT	GB	Home	Road	Conf.
x - New York Liberty	23	11	.676	–	12–5	11–6	13–9
x - Chicago Sky	21	13	.618	2	13–4	8–9	14–8
x - Indiana Fever	20	14	.588	3	11–6	9–8	13–9
x - Washington Mystics	18	16	.529	5	11–6	7–10	10–12
e - Atlanta Dream	15	19	.441	8	9–8	6–11	10–12
e - Connecticut Sun	15	19	.441	8	8–9	7–10	6–16

== Statistics ==
Legend
GP	Games played	GS	Games started	MPG	Minutes per game	RPG	Rebounds per game
APG	Assists per game	SPG	Steals per game	BPG	Blocks per game	PPG	Points per game
FG%	Field-goal percentage	3P%	3-point field-goal percentage	FT%	Free-throw percentage	TO	Turnovers per game
PF	Fouls per game		Team leader		League leader

=== Regular season ===
Player	GP	GS	MPG	FG%	3P%	FT%	RPG	APG	SPG	BPG	PPG
Alex Bentley	25	25	30.0	40.9%	33.6%	83.0%	2.0	2.0	2.0	0.2	14.7
Kelsey Bone	34	33	28.3	50.8%	0.0%	62.2%	6.1	1.9	0.8	0.6	15.0
Camille Little	34	34	27.0	40.6%	34.5%	87.9%	3.6	1.6	1.2	0.2	8.2
Jasmine Thomas	34	34	26.7	32.8%	29.8%	78.3%	3.7	3.9	1.2	0.4	8.2
Alyssa Thomas	24	23	26.0	41.1%	—	69.2%	5.3	1.4	1.2	0.2	8.8
Shekinna Stricklen	34	0	17.6	41.1%	35.9%	78.6%	1.9	0.6	0.6	0.2	7.7
Jennifer Lacy	19	11	16.7	44.4%	35.4%	75.7%	2.4	0.4	0.4	0.5	7.0
Chelsea Gray	34	0	16.0	42.4%	34.8%	81.6%	2.3	2.7	0.6	0.1	6.9
Kayla Pedersen	33	1	15.5	43.3%	—	82.6%	2.6	1.2	0.7	0.2	2.9
Kelly Faris	32	9	14.5	38.1%	31.0%	77.8%	1.7	1.0	0.4	0.1	2.9
Elizabeth Williams	21	0	11.7	52.8%	—	56.0%	3.2	0.4	0.3	0.9	3.3
Nikki Greene	12	0	8.4	40.0%	—	85.7%	2.0	0.2	0.3	0.4	1.2
Inga Orekhova	4	0	2.8	0.0%	0.0%	—	0.3	—	—	—	—

== Awards and honors ==
Recipient	Award	Date awarded	Ref.
Kelsey Bone	WNBA Most Improved Player	October 1, 2015	
