= 2015 Seattle Storm season =

- Head coach: Jenny Boucek
- Arena: KeyArena

Results
- Record: 10–24 (.294)
- Place: 5th (Western)
- Playoff finish: Did not qualify

The 2015 WNBA season was the 16th season for the Seattle Storm of the WNBA.

== WNBA draft ==
Round	Pick	Player	Nationality	School/Team/Country
1	1	Jewell Loyd	United States	Notre Dame
2	18	Vicky McIntyre	United States	Oral Roberts University
3	26	Nneka Enemkpali	United States	Texas

== Roster ==
2015 Seattle Storm roster
Players
Coaches

Pos.	No.	Nat.	Name	Height	Weight	DOB	From	Yrs
G	10	(United States)	Bird, Sue	5' 9" (1.75m)	150 lb (68kg)	1980-10-16	Connecticut	13
F/C	5	(Australia)	Bishop, Abby	6' 3" (1.91m)	180 lb (82kg)	1988-11-29	Australia	1
F	32	(United States)	Clark, Alysha	5' 10" (1.78m)	167 lb (76kg)	1987-07-07	Middle Tennessee	3
C	9	(United States)	Gatling, Markeisha	6' 5" (1.96m)	255 lb (116kg)	1992-07-14	NC State	1
G	3	(United States)	Goodrich, Angel	5' 4" (1.63m)	127 lb (58kg)	1990-02-24	Kansas	2
C	13	(United States)	Hollingsworth, Quanitra	6' 5" (1.96m)	200 lb (91kg)	1988-11-15	VCU	4
F/C	1	(United States)	Langhorne, Crystal	6' 2" (1.88m)	185 lb (84kg)	1986-10-27	Maryland	7
G	24	(United States)	Loyd, Jewell	5' 10" (1.78m)	148 lb (67kg)	1993-10-05	Notre Dame	R
F	23	(United States)	Mosqueda-Lewis, Kaleena	5' 11" (1.8m)	180 lb (82kg)	1993-11-03	Connecticut	R
G	4	(Australia)	O'Hea, Jenna	6' 1" (1.85m)	174 lb (79kg)	1987-06-06	Australia	4
F	7	(Japan)	Tokashiki, Ramu	6' 3" (1.91m)	176 lb (80kg)	1991-06-01	Japan	R
G/F	22	(United States)	Wright, Monica (injured)	5' 10" (1.78m)	182 lb (83kg)	1988-07-15	Virginia	5

Head coach
(United States) Jenny Boucek (Virginia)
Assistant coaches
(United States) Rob Fodor (Hillsdale)
(United States) Ryan Webb (Seattle)
Athletic trainer
(United States) Tom Spencer (Central Washington)
Strength and conditioning coach
(United States) Melissa Hardin (Western Washington)

Legend

- (C) Team captain
- (DP) Unsigned draft pick
- (FA) Free agent
- (S) Suspended
- Injured

== Season standings ==
Eastern Conference	W	L	PCT	GB	Home	Road	Conf.
x - New York Liberty	23	11	.676	–	12–5	11–6	13–9
x - Chicago Sky	21	13	.618	2	13–4	8–9	14–8
x - Indiana Fever	20	14	.588	3	11–6	9–8	13–9
x - Washington Mystics	18	16	.529	5	11–6	7–10	10–12
e - Atlanta Dream	15	19	.441	8	9–8	6–11	10–12
e - Connecticut Sun	15	19	.441	8	8–9	7–10	6–16

Western Conference	W	L	PCT	GB	Home	Road	Conf.
z - Minnesota Lynx	22	12	.647	–	13–4	9–8	16–6
x - Phoenix Mercury	20	14	.588	2	13–4	7–10	15–7
x - Tulsa Shock	18	16	.529	4	12–5	6–11	11–11
x - Los Angeles Sparks	14	20	.412	8	9–8	5–12	10–12
e - Seattle Storm	10	24	.294	12	8–9	2–15	8–14
e - San Antonio Stars	8	26	.235	14	7–10	1–16	6–16

== Schedule ==
- Seattle Storm 2015 Schedule - Storm Home and Away - ESPN
