= 2015 Indiana Fever season =

16th season in the WNBA

- Head coach: Stephanie White
- Arena: Bankers Life Fieldhouse

Results
- Record: 20–14 (.588)
- Place: 3rd (Eastern)
- Playoff finish: 4th seed overall; Lost in Finals 3–2 to Minnesota

Media
- Television: FSMW, ESPN2

The 2015 WNBA season was the 16th season for the Indiana Fever of the Women's National Basketball Association. This was Fever's first season under head coach, Stephanie White, who was promoted to the position after Lin Dunn retired at the end of 2014 season.

Fever finished third in the Eastern Conference with a record of 20–14. Fever faced Chicago Sky in Round 1 of Playoffs, winning the series 2–1. They then faced New York Liberty in the eastern conference final. After losing Game 1 at the Madison Square Garden, Fever won the next two games to win the series 2–1 and make the 2015 WNBA Finals where they faced Minnesota Lynx.

In the Finals, Fever won game 1 (75–69) to take a 1–0 lead in the series. Fever lost the next two games to go behind 1–2 before winning the fourth game at home tying the series 2–2. The Fever fell in the decisive 5th game to the Lynx, 52–69.

During the 2015 season, Tamika Catchings broke multiple notable WNBA records. On August 26, she became the first player in WNBA history to record 1,000 career steals. And during the 2015 playoffs, she became the first to register 1,000 career playoff points and also the player with the most playoff appearances (65).

== Draft ==
Round	Pick	Player	Position	Nationality	College/Club	Outcome	Ref.
2	21	Chelsea Gardner	F	United States	Kansas Jayhawks	Waived on May 29	

== Transactions ==
=== Front office and coaching ===
Date	Details	Ref.
September 24, 2014	Promoted Stephanie White to head coach	

=== Trades ===
March
March 12	To Indiana Fever Shenise Johnson; 2015 No. 21 draft pick (Chelsea Gardner)	To San Antonio Stars 2015 No. 6 draft pick (Dearica Hamby) and 2015 No. 30 draft pick (Dragana Stanković)

=== Free agency ===
==== Re-signed / extensions ====
Player	Date	Notes	Ref.
Layshia Clarendon	January 1	Exercised team option (Fourth-year)	
Sydney Carter	February 10	Details not announced	
Lynetta Kizer	February 10	Details not announced	
Tamika Catchings	February 26	Two-year deal	
Shavonte Zellous	June 11	Activated (Post temporary suspension)	
Natalie Achonwa	August 18	Activated (Post temporary suspension)	
Briann January	August 31	Multi-year contract extension	

==== Additions ====
Player	Date	Notes	Former Team	Ref.
Jeanette Pohlen	February 5	Training camp contract	—	
Natalie Achonwa	February 6	Rookie contract (2014 draft pick – No. 9)	Notre Dame Fighting Irish	
Briana Butler	February 10	Training camp contract	Connecticut Sun	
Ty Marshall	February 10	Training camp contract	ACS Sepsi SIC (Romania)	
Alicia DeVaughn	March 10	Training camp contract	Tarbes Gespe Bigorre (France)	
Chelsea Gardner	April 24	Rookie contract (2015 draft pick – No. 21)	Kansas Jayhawks	

=== Subtractions / Unsigned ===
Player	Date	Reason	New Team	Ref.
Krystal Thomas	January 12	Free agency – restricted (qualifying offer extended)	N/A – did not appear in league for 2015 season	
Karima Christmas	February 5	Free agency – restricted	Tulsa Shock	
Sydney Carter	May 29	Waived	Atlanta Dream	
Alicia DeVaughn	May 29	Waived	—	
Chelsea Gardner	May 29	Waived	—	
Ty Marshall	May 29	Waived	—	
Shavonte Zellous	June 4	Suspended contract – temporary	N/A – retained rights	
Briana Butler	June 11	Waived	—	
Natalie Achonwa	August 7	Suspended contract – temporary	N/A – retained rights	

== Roster ==
2015 Indiana Fever roster
Players
Coaches

Pos.	No.	Nat.	Name	Height	Weight	DOB	From	Yrs
F/C	11	(Canada)	Achonwa, Natalie	6' 3" (1.91m)	198 lb (90kg)	1992-11-22	Notre Dame	R
F	24	(United States)	Catchings, Tamika	6' 1" (1.85m)	167 lb (76kg)	1979-07-21	Tennessee	13
G	5	(United States)	Clarendon, Layshia	5' 9" (1.75m)	158 lb (72kg)	1991-05-02	California	2
G/F	25	(United States)	Coleman, Marissa	6' 1" (1.85m)	160 lb (73kg)	1987-01-04	Maryland	6
F	33	(United States)	Howard, Natasha	6' 2" (1.88m)	165 lb (75kg)	1991-09-02	Florida State	1
G	20	(United States)	January, Briann	5' 8" (1.73m)	148 lb (67kg)	1987-01-11	Arizona State	6
G	42	(United States)	Johnson, Shenise	5' 11" (1.8m)	172 lb (78kg)	1990-12-08	Miami (FL)	3
F	12	(Bosnia and Herzegovina)	Kizer, Lynetta	6' 4" (1.93m)	243 lb (110kg)	1990-04-04	Maryland	3
F	2	(United States)	Larkins, Erlana	6' 1" (1.85m)	205 lb (93kg)	1986-04-02	North Carolina	5
G	8	(United States)	Lucas, Maggie	5' 10" (1.78m)	158 lb (72kg)	1991-11-29	Penn State	1
G	32	(United States)	Pohlen, Jeanette	6' 0" (1.83m)	171 lb (78kg)	1989-05-02	Stanford	3
G	1	(Croatia)	Zellous, Shavonte	5' 10" (1.78m)	188 lb (85kg)	1986-08-28	Pittsburgh	6

Head coach
(United States) Stephanie White (Purdue)
Assistant coaches
(United States) Gail Goestenkors (Saginaw Valley State)
(United States) Gary Kloppenburg (UC San Diego)
Player development
(United States) Carlos Knox (IUPUI)
Athletic trainer
(United States) Todd Champlin (Daemen)
Strength and conditioning coach
(United States) Josh Jones (Indiana State)

Legend

- (C) Team captain
- (DP) Unsigned draft pick
- (FA) Free agent
- (S) Suspended
- Injured

=== Depth ===
Pos.	Starter	Bench
PG	Briann January	Maggie Lucas; Layshia Clarendon
SG	Shenise Johnson	Shavonte Zellous; Jeanette Pohlen
SF	Marissa Coleman	Natasha Howard
PF	Tamika Catchings	Erlana Larkins
C	Natalie Achonwa	Lynetta Kizer

== Schedule ==
=== Preseason ===
2015 pre-season game log
Total: 1–1 (Home: 1–1; Road: 0–0)
May: 1–1 (Home: 1–1; Road: 0–0)

Game	Date	Team	Score	High points	High rebounds	High assists	Location Attendance	Record
1	May 23	Connecticut	L 68–76	Shenise Johnson (13)	Natasha Howard (5)	Layshia Clarendon (3)	KFC Yum! Center; 6,437	0–1
2	May 29	Washington	W 76–74	Marissa Coleman (19)	Briana Butler (6)	Marissa Coleman (4)	Corteva Coliseum; 5,245	1–1

2015 pre-season schedule

=== Regular season ===
2015 game log
Total: 20–14 (Home: 11–6; Road: 9–8)
June: 4–6 (Home: 1–4; Road: 3–2)

Game	Date	Team	Score	High points	High rebounds	High assists	Location Attendance	Record
1	June 5	@ Chicago	L 72–95	Marissa Coleman (18)	Natasha Howard (8)	Briann January (3)	Allstate Arena; 8,123	0–1
2	June 6	Minnesota	L 69–78	Marissa Coleman (16)	Tied (5)	Tied (3)	Bankers Life Fieldhouse; 9,034	0–2
3	June 9	@ New York	L 79–86	Layshia Clarendon (14)	Tamika Catchings (7)	Briann January (5)	Madison Square Garden; 5,663	0–3
4	June 12	Phoenix	W 77–74	Tamika Catchings (27)	Tamika Catchings (13)	Catchings, Johnson (2)	Bankers Life Fieldhouse; 6,987	1–3
5	June 14	Chicago	L 72–98	Marissa Coleman (16)	Shenise Johnson (7)	Shenise Johnson (4)	Bankers Life Fieldhouse; 6,433	1–4
6	June 16	@ Atlanta	W 90–79	Marissa Coleman (18)	Tamika Catchings (10)	Layshia Clarendon (7)	Philips Arena; 9,814	2–4
7	June 19	@ New York	W 80–63	Maggie Lucas (23)	Tamika Catchings (8)	Marissa Coleman (7)	Madison Square Garden; 7,815	3–4
8	June 20	Washington	L 75–87	Kizer, January (14)	Lynetta Kizer (6)	Briann January (7)	Bankers Life Fieldhouse; 7,627	3–5
9	June 26	Chicago	L 77–83	Marissa Coleman (16)	Marissa Coleman (8)	Briann January (4)	Bankers Life Fieldhouse; 6,889	3–6
10	June 30	@ Connecticut	W 92–84	Tamika Catchings (26)	Tamika Catchings (10)	Briann January (7)	Mohegan Sun Arena; 5,083	4–6

July : 6–2 (Home: 5–0; Road: 1–2)

Game	Date	Team	Score	High points	High rebounds	High assists	Location Attendance	Record
11	July 2	Washington	W 73–50	Shenise Johnson (16)	Shenise Johnson (11)	Tamika Catchings (5)	Bankers Life Fieldhouse; 7,573	5–6
12	July 8	Seattle	W 88–65	Lynetta Kizer (17)	Coleman, Kizer (6)	Layshia Clarendon (5)	Bankers Life Fieldhouse; 12,189	6–6
13	July 10	San Antonio	W 83–76	Marissa Coleman (25)	Coleman, Larkins (6)	Briann January (4)	Bankers Life Fieldhouse; 6,457	7–6
14	July 15	Tulsa	W 83–80	Shavonte Zellous (16)	Catchings, Howard (11)	Layshia Clarendon (4)	Bankers Life Fieldhouse; 6,435	8–6
15	July 17	@ Washington	L 50–68	Marissa Coleman (11)	Lynetta Kizer (8)	Layshia Clarendon (4)	Capital One Arena; 7,111	8–7
16	July 21	@ San Antonio	L 80–62	Tamika Catchings (20)	Tied (3)	Shavonte Zellous (4)	Freeman Coliseum; 6,846	8–8
17	July 28	@ Connecticut	W 75–73	Shavonte Zellous (19)	Catchings, Larkins (8)	Tied (2)	Mohegan Sun Arena; 4,868	9–8
18	July 29	New York	W 84–72	Shenise Johnson (19)	Shenise Johnson (8)	Briann January (8)	Bankers Life Fieldhouse; 6,807	10–8

August : 7–4 (Home: 3–2; Road: 4–2)

Game	Date	Team	Score	High points	High rebounds	High assists	Location Attendance	Record
19	August 2	Connecticut	W 83–70	Shenise Johnson (16)	Erlana Larkins (13)	Briann January (5)	Bankers Life Fieldhouse; 6,601	11–8
20	August 4	@ Chicago	L 82–106	Maggie Lucas (14)	Tamika Catchings (8)	Shenise Johnson (4)	Allstate Arena; 4,979	11–9
21	August 7	Atlanta	W 106–77	Marissa Coleman (19)	Shenise Johnson (7)	Marissa Coleman (4)	Bankers Life Fieldhouse; 7,869	12–9
22	August 11	@ Washington	W 73–62	Tamika Catchings (20)	Shenise Johnson (9)	Briann January (6)	Capital One Arena; 7,236	13–9
23	August 16	@ Phoenix	W 75–63	Lynetta Kizer (19)	Tamika Catchings (9)	Shenise Johnson (5)	US Airways Center; 11,336	14–9
24	August 18	@ Los Angeles	W 79–68	Tamika Catchings (20)	Lynetta Kizer (11)	Briann January (3)	STAPLES Center; 7,046	15–9
25	August 21	@ Seattle	W 75–63	Shenise Johnson (16)	Johnson, Kizer (5)	Marissa Coleman (4)	KeyArena; 5,726	16–9
26	August 23	New York	W 80–79	Tamika Catchings (14)	Tamika Catchings (7)	Briann January (5)	Bankers Life Fieldhouse; 7,240	17–9
27	August 26	Los Angeles	L 79–81	Shenise Johnson (16)	Tamika Catchings (10)	Shavonte Zellous (5)	Bankers Life Fieldhouse; 6,822	17–10
28	August 28	Atlanta	L 84–90	Tamika Catchings (24)	Tamika Catchings (7)	Tamika Catchings (3)	Bankers Life Fieldhouse; 7,303	17–11
29	August 30	@ Tulsa	L 70–76	Tamika Catchings (22)	Tamika Catchings (13)	Shenise Johnson (6)	BOK Center; 4,512	17–12

September : 3–2 (Home: 2–0; Road: 1–2)

Game	Date	Team	Score	High points	High rebounds	High assists	Location Attendance	Record
30	September 1	Connecticut	W 81–51	Tamika Catchings (13)	Erlana Larkins (8)	Tamika Catchings (3)	Bankers Life Fieldhouse; 5,768	18–12
31	September 4	@ Minnesota	L 65–81	Marissa Coleman (16)	Tamika Catchings (9)	Clarendon, Johnson (3)	Target Center; 9,034	18–13
32	September 8	@ Washington	L 72–76	Layshia Clarendon (15)	Tamika Catchings (7)	Tied (3)	Capital One Arena; 5,262	18–14
33	September 11	@ Atlanta	W 75–67	Shavonte Zellous (14)	Natalie Achonwa (9)	Shavonte Zellous (5)	Philips Arena; 5,823	19–14
34	September 13	New York	W 81–76	Shavonte Zellous (22)	Erlana Larkins (8)	Larkins, Zellous (3)	Bankers Life Fieldhouse; 9,210	20–14

2015 season schedule

=== Playoffs ===
2015 playoff game log
Conference Semi-Finals vs. Chicago Sky
Won Series: 2–1

Game	Date	Team	Score	High points	High rebounds	High assists	Location Attendance	Series
1	September 17	@ Chicago	L 72–77	Tamika Catchings (21)	Erlana Larkins (10)	Briann January (7)	UIC Pavilion; 4,098	0–1
2	September 19	Chicago	W 89–82	Tamika Catchings (22)	Erlana Larkins (12)	Shavonte Zellous (8)	Bankers Life Fieldhouse; 7,124	1–1
3	September 21	@ Chicago	W 100–89	Tamika Catchings (27)	Tamika Catchings (9)	Briann January (8)	Allstate Arena; 2,882	2–1

Conference Finals vs. New York Liberty
Won Series: 2–1

Game	Date	Team	Score	High points	High rebounds	High assists	Location Attendance	Series
1	September 23	@ New York	L 67–84	Shenise Johnson (12)	Shavonte Zellous (5)	Tied (2)	Madison Square Garden; 7,229	0–1
2	September 27	New York	W 70–64	Tamika Catchings (25)	Tamika Catchings (7)	Briann January (4)	Bankers Life Fieldhouse; 7,505	1–1
3	September 29	@ New York	W 66–51	Marissa Coleman (15)	Erlana Larkins (8)	Briann January (8)	Madison Square Garden; 10,120	2–1

WNBA Finals vs. Minnesota Lynx
Lost Series: 2–3

Game	Date	Team	Score	High points	High rebounds	High assists	Location Attendance	Series
1	October 4	@ Minnesota	W 75–69	Briann January (19)	Erlana Larkins (8)	Briann January (6)	Target Center; 11,023	1–0
2	October 6	@ Minnesota	L 71–77	Briann January (17)	Tied (9)	Tied (5)	Target Center; 12,134	1–1
3	October 9	Minnesota	L 77–80	Shenise Johnson (17)	Tamika Catchings (10)	Briann January (8)	Bankers Life Fieldhouse; 16,332	1–2
4	October 11	Minnesota	W 75–69	Shenise Johnson (15)	Erlana Larkins (6)	Briann January (5)	Bankers Life Fieldhouse; 10,582	2–2
5	October 14	@ Minnesota	L 52–69	Tamika Catchings (18)	Tamika Catchings (11)	Tied (3)	Target Center; 18,933	2–3

2015 playoff schedule

== Standings ==
Eastern Conference	W	L	PCT	GB	Home	Road	Conf.
x - New York Liberty	23	11	.676	–	12–5	11–6	13–9
x - Chicago Sky	21	13	.618	2	13–4	8–9	14–8
x - Indiana Fever	20	14	.588	3	11–6	9–8	13–9
x - Washington Mystics	18	16	.529	5	11–6	7–10	10–12
e - Atlanta Dream	15	19	.441	8	9–8	6–11	10–12
e - Connecticut Sun	15	19	.441	8	8–9	7–10	6–16

Notes

x – Clinched playoff spot
e – Eliminated from playoffs

== Bracket ==
Conference Semi-Finals: Best-of-3
E1	**New York**	83	**86**	**79**
E4	Washington	**86**	68	74
Eastern Conference
E2	Chicago	**77**	82	89
E3	**Indiana**	72	**89**	**100**
W1	**Minnesota**	**67**	71	**91**
W4	Los Angeles	65	**81**	80
Western Conference
W2	**Phoenix**	**88**	**91**	—
W3	Tulsa	55	67	—

Conference Finals: Best-of-3
E1	New York	**84**	64	51
E3	**Indiana**	67	**70**	**66**
W1	**Minnesota**	**67**	**72**	—
W2	Phoenix	60	71	—

WNBA Finals: Best-of-5
E3	Indiana	**75**	71	77	**75**	52
W1	**Minnesota**	69	**77**	**80**	69	**69**

- **Bold** – Series winner
- Italics – Team with home-court advantage

== Statistics ==
Legend
GP	Games played	GS	Games started	MPG	Minutes per game	RPG	Rebounds per game
APG	Assists per game	SPG	Steals per game	BPG	Blocks per game	PPG	Points per game
FG%	Field-goal percentage	3P%	3-point field-goal percentage	FT%	Free-throw percentage	TO	Turnovers per game
PF	Fouls per game		Team leader		League leader

=== Regular season ===
Player	GP	GS	MPG	FG%	3P%	FT%	RPG	APG	SPG	BPG	TO	PF	PPG
Tamika Catchings	30	30	26.6	.382	.295	.868	7.1	2.2	1.8	0.8	1.7	2.5	13.1
Shenise Johnson	31	27	26.2	.467	.413	.805	4.9	2.4	1.1	0.2	1.8	2.2	10.9
Marissa Coleman	34	34	24.8	.384	.336	.747	3.5	1.6	1.2	0.3	1.9	1.9	10.4
Shavonte Zellous	23	1	22.2	.379	.241	.771	2.3	1.9	1.0	0.3	1.2	3.0	8.4
Lynetta Kizer	33	14	17.9	.491	.000	.879	3.5	0.4	0.6	0.2	1.4	2.8	8.3
Briann January	29	29	27.0	.426	.431	.845	1.8	3.4	1.0	0.2	2.2	2.2	8.1
Natalie Achonwa	28	17	17.3	.550	—	.746	3.5	0.6	0.5	0.5	1.3	2.1	8.0
Layshia Clarendon	29	12	20.8	.445	.406	.765	2.7	2.0	0.7	0.0	1.6	2.0	6.7
Maggie Lucas	30	0	15.0	.372	.373	.838	0.8	0.9	0.4	0.1	0.6	1.4	5.7
Natasha Howard	30	2	11.4	.379	.000	.721	2.6	0.4	0.4	0.4	0.9	2.0	4.2
Erlana Larkins	21	3	16.8	.407	—	.684	4.2	1.3	1.0	0.2	0.7	1.6	3.5
Jeanette Pohlen	26	1	10.0	.404	.395	.750	0.8	0.6	0.5	0.0	0.4	0.9	2.4
Briana Butler ^{‡}	3	0	7.7	.200	.000	—	0.7	0.0	0.3	0.3	0.3	0.3	0.7

^{‡}Waived/Released during the season
^{†}Traded during the season
^{≠}Acquired during the season

=== Playoffs ===
Player	GP	GS	MPG	FG%	3P%	FT%	RPG	APG	SPG	BPG	TO	PF	PPG
Tamika Catchings	11	11	32.6	.433	.469	.857	6.9	2.6	2.0	1.0	2.6	2.5	16.3
Shenise Johnson	11	11	30.5	.500	.286	.933	4.5	1.5	0.7	0.5	1.2	1.5	12.4
Marissa Coleman	11	11	29.0	.403	.412	.700	2.5	0.9	1.1	0.4	0.9	2.1	11.9
Briann January	11	11	32.2	.407	.286	.933	2.3	5.0	1.4	0.3	2.7	2.5	11.3
Shavonte Zellous	11	0	21.5	.438	.308	.800	2.4	1.9	0.7	0.5	1.3	2.6	7.6
Erlana Larkins	11	10	28.3	.569	—	.813	7.2	1.4	1.0	0.5	1.8	2.7	7.2
Lynetta Kizer	9	0	8.9	.414	—	.750	2.4	0.2	0.3	0.1	0.8	0.9	3.0
Natasha Howard	9	0	7.1	.917	—	1.000	0.6	0.3	0.3	0.1	0.6	1.1	2.8
Natalie Achonwa	6	1	7.0	.267	—	.500	1.5	0.3	0.0	0.2	1.2	1.7	1.8
Layshia Clarendon	9	0	6.1	.500	.000	1.000	0.7	0.6	0.1	0.0	0.4	0.3	1.3
Maggie Lucas	5	0	3.8	.667	1.000	1.000	0.0	0.0	0.0	0.0	0.4	0.2	1.2
Jeanette Pohlen	6	0	4.5	.000	.000	—	0.2	0.2	0.0	0.0	0.0	0.2	0.0

== Awards and honors ==
Recipient	Award	Date awarded	Ref.
Natalie Achonwa	Rookie of the Month – June	July 6	
Natalie Achonwa	WNBA All-Rookie Team	September 24	
Tamika Catchings	Eastern Conference Player of the Week	July 6	
Tamika Catchings	WNBA All-Star Starter	July 14	
Tamika Catchings	ESPN Sports Humanitarian of the Year	July 15	
Tamika Catchings	WNBA All-Defensive First Team	September 27	
Tamika Catchings	All-WNBA Second Team	October 8	
Marissa Coleman	WNBA All-Star Reserve	July 21	
Briann January	WNBA Cares Community Assist Award – August	September 11	
Briann January	WNBA All-Defensive First Team	September 27	
Jeanette Pohlen	WNBA Cares Community Assist Award – June	June 26	
