= 2015 Minnesota Lynx season =

- WNBA champions
- Head coach: Cheryl Reeve
- Arena: Target Center

Results
- Record: 22–12 (.647)
- Place: 1st (Western)
- Playoff finish: WNBA Champions

Media
- Television: ESPN

The 2015 Minnesota Lynx season was the 17th season for the Minnesota Lynx of the Women's National Basketball Association, and the 6th season under head coach Cheryl Reeve.

The Lynx became the third franchise to win three titles.

== Transactions ==
=== WNBA draft ===
Round	Pick	Player	Nationality	School/Team/Country
2	16	Reshanda Gray	United States	California
3	35	Shae Kelley	United States	Minnesota

=== Trades and roster changes ===
Date	Trade
April 15, 2015	Acquired G Anna Cruz from New York for the 11th pick in the 2015 draft
May 14, 2015	Signed F Asjha Jones
July 20, 2015	Acquired G Renee Montgomery from Seattle for G Monica Wright and a 2016 second-round draft pick
July 27, 2015	Acquired C Sylvia Fowles and a 2016 second-round pick from Chicago for F Damiris Dantas, G Reshanda Gray and a 2016 first-round draft pick
July 28, 2015	Signed F Shae Kelley for rest of the season after cutting her from roster earlier in season
September 2, 2015	Signed G Kalana Greene

== Roster ==
2015 Minnesota Lynx roster
Players
Coaches

Pos.	No.	Nat.	Name	Height	Weight	DOB	From	Yrs
G/F	33	(United States)	Augustus, Seimone	6' 0" (1.83m)	165 lb (75kg)	1984-04-30	LSU	10
F	32	(United States)	Brunson, Rebekkah	6' 2" (1.88m)	185 lb (84kg)	1981-12-11	Georgetown	12
G	51	(Spain)	Cruz, Anna	5' 9" (1.75m)	135 lb (61kg)	1986-10-27	Spain	2
C	34	(United States)	Fowles, Sylvia	6' 6" (1.98m)	215 lb (98kg)	1985-10-06	LSU	8
G	3	(United States)	Greene, Kalana	5' 10" (1.78m)	155 lb (70kg)	1987-07-13	Connecticut	6
F	15	(United States)	Jones, Asjha	6' 2" (1.88m)	187 lb (85kg)	1980-08-01	Connecticut	12
F	1	(United States)	Kelley, Shae	6' 1" (1.85m)	166 lb (75kg)	1991-09-29	Minnesota	R
G	20	(United States)	Liston, Tricia	6' 0" (1.83m)	185 lb (84kg)	1992-02-20	Duke	2
G	21	(United States)	Montgomery, Renee	5' 7" (1.7m)	140 lb (64kg)	1986-12-02	Connecticut	7
F	23	(United States)	Moore, Maya	6' 0" (1.83m)	177 lb (80kg)	1989-07-11	Connecticut	5
G	13	(United States)	Whalen, Lindsay	5' 9" (1.75m)	164 lb (74kg)	1982-05-09	Minnesota	12
F	14	(United States)	Peters, Devereaux	6' 2" (1.88m)	174 lb (79kg)	1989-10-08	Notre Dame	4

Head coach
(United States) Cheryl Reeve (La Salle)
Assistant coaches
(United States) Shelley Patterson (Washington State)
(United States) Jim Petersen (Minnesota)
Athletic trainer
(United States) Chuck Barta (UW–La Crosse)
Assistant trainer
(United States) Kate Taber (Iowa)

Legend

- (C) Team captain
- (DP) Unsigned draft pick
- (FA) Free agent
- (S) Suspended
- Injured

== Season standings ==
Western Conference	W	L	PCT	GB	Home	Road	Conf.
z - Minnesota Lynx	22	12	.647	–	13–4	9–8	16–6
x - Phoenix Mercury	20	14	.588	2	13–4	7–10	15–7
x - Tulsa Shock	18	16	.529	4	12–5	6–11	11–11
x - Los Angeles Sparks	14	20	.412	8	9–8	5–12	10–12
e - Seattle Storm	10	24	.294	12	8–9	2–15	8–14
e - San Antonio Stars	8	26	.235	14	7–10	1–16	6–16

Eastern Conference	W	L	PCT	GB	Home	Road	Conf.
x - New York Liberty	23	11	.676	–	12–5	11–6	13–9
x - Chicago Sky	21	13	.618	2	13–4	8–9	14–8
x - Indiana Fever	20	14	.588	3	11–6	9–8	13–9
x - Washington Mystics	18	16	.529	5	11–6	7–10	10–12
e - Atlanta Dream	15	19	.441	8	9–8	6–11	10–12
e - Connecticut Sun	15	19	.441	8	8–9	7–10	6–16

== Schedule ==
- Minnesota Lynx 2015 Schedule - Lynx Home and Away - ESPN

== Statistics ==
Legend
GP	Games played	GS	Games started	MPG	Minutes per game	RPG	Rebounds per game
APG	Assists per game	SPG	Steals per game	BPG	Blocks per game	PPG	Points per game
FG%	Field-goal percentage	3P%	3-point field-goal percentage	FT%	Free-throw percentage	TO	Turnovers per game
PF	Fouls per game		Team leader		League leader

== Awards and honors ==
After winning their third WNBA championship this season, the Lynx were honored with a private party hosted by renowned Minnesota music legend Prince at his Chanhassen home.
