= 2015 San Antonio Stars season =

- Head coach: Dan Hughes
- Arena: Freeman Coliseum

Results
- Record: 8–26 (.235)
- Place: 6th (Western)
- Playoff finish: Did Not Qualify

The 2015 WNBA season was the eighteenth season for the San Antonio Stars of the Women's National Basketball Association. The Stars played their home games at Freeman Coliseum due to renovation at AT&T Center. The season tipped off on June 5, on the road against the Phoenix Mercury. The Stars lost that game 71–76 and went on to lose their first six games of the season. Their losses against Tulsa and Minnesota came by double digits. Their sixth and final loss of the streak came in overtime against Chicago. Their first win came on June 25, at home, against Phoenix. They followed that with a defeat of Seattle before losing to Phoenix to end June with a 2–7 record. They started July by losing and then defeating Los Angeles. The Stars then lost all three games of a three game road trip, with the worst loss being a twenty-seven point loss to Minnesota. They broke their streak by defeating Tulsa at home, before losing to Chicago on the road. They defeated Indiana 80–62 and Atlanta 102–85 before losing to Washington 88–53. The Stars ended July 4–6. They started August with three straight losses, before defeating Seattle on August 8. The Stars would not win another game in August, losing six straight games to end the month. The worst loss of the stretch was a thirty-one point loss to Los Angeles. Their August record was 1–10. The losing streak extended into September and reached nine games, as the Stars lost their first three games of September. They only lost by one point to Connecticut during the stretch, but followed that with a thirty-point loss to Phoenix. The Stars ended the season with a 59–58 defeat of Seattle, their only road victory of the season.

Their 8–26 overall record saw them finish in sixth place in the Western Conference, and they did not qualify for the 2015 WNBA playoffs. Their eight total wins were the second lowest in franchise history at the time, only behind their seven wins in 1997 and 2005 .

== Transactions ==
=== WNBA draft ===
Round	Pick	Player	Nationality	School/Team/Country
1	6	Dearica Hamby	United States	Wake Forest
3	30	Dragana Stanković	Serbia	UNIQA Euroleasing Sopron (Hungary)
3	33	Nikki Moody	United States	Iowa State

=== Trades/Roster Changes ===
Date	Trade
March 13	Signed Danielle Adams
April 16	The Stars acquired Alex Montgomery from the New York Liberty in exchange for the ninth pick in the 2015 draft.
July 5	The Stars acquired Samantha Logic from the Atlanta Dream in exchange for the Star's second round pick in the 2016 draft.

== Roster ==
2015 San Antonio Stars roster
Players
Coaches

Pos.	No.	Nat.	Name	Height	Weight	DOB	From	Yrs
C	40	(Canada)	Alexander, Kayla	6' 4" (1.93m)	195 lb (88kg)	1991-01-05	Syracuse	2
F/C	23	(United States)	Adams, Danielle	6' 1" (1.85m)	239 lb (108kg)	1989-02-19	Texas A&M	4
C	32	(United States)	Appel, Jayne	6' 4" (1.93m)	210 lb (95kg)	1988-05-14	Stanford	5
F	11	(France)	Ayayi, Valériane	6' 1" (1.85m)	152 lb (69kg)	1994-04-29	France	R
F	5	(United States)	Hamby, Dearica	6' 3" (1.91m)	189 lb (86kg)	1993-11-06	Wake Forest	R
G	22	(United States)	Logic, Samantha	5' 9" (1.75m)	177 lb (80kg)	1992-10-22	Iowa	R
G	21	(United States)	McBride, Kayla (injured)	5' 11" (1.8m)	179 lb (81kg)	1992-06-25	Notre Dame	1
G/F	6	(United States)	Montgomery, Alex	6' 1" (1.85m)	185 lb (84kg)	1988-11-12	Georgia Tech	4
G	13	(United States)	Robinson, Danielle (injured)	5' 9" (1.75m)	137 lb (62kg)	1989-05-10	Oklahoma	4
G	7	(United States)	Perkins, Jia	5' 8" (1.73m)	165 lb (75kg)	1982-02-23	Texas Tech	11
F	33	(United States)	Young, Sophia	6' 1" (1.85m)	165 lb (75kg)	1983-12-15	Baylor	8
G	51	(United States)	Colson, Sydney	5' 8" (1.73m)	137 lb (62kg)	1989-08-06	Texas A&M	1

Head coach
(United States) Dan Hughes (Muskingum)
Assistant coaches
(United States) Vickie Johnson (Louisiana Tech)
(United States) James Wade (Kennesaw State)
Athletic trainer
(United States) Tonya Holley (St. Andrews Presbyterian)
Strength and conditioning coach
(United States) Chrissy Stragisher (Muskingum)

Legend

- (C) Team captain
- (DP) Unsigned draft pick
- (FA) Free agent
- (S) Suspended
- Injured

== Game log ==
=== Preseason ===
2015 pre-season game log
May: 0–2 (Home: 0–1; Road: 0–1)

Game	Date	Team	Score	High points	High rebounds	High assists	Location Attendance	Record
1	May 22	@ Tulsa	L 51–81	Jia Perkins (9)	Appel-Marinelli, Hamby (6)	Jayne Appel-Marinelli (3)	BOK Center; 2,937	0–1
2	May 28	Tulsa	L 71–79	Kayla Alexander (16)	Kayla Alexander (12)	Sydney Colson (7)	Freeman Coliseum; 3,822	0–2

2015 pre-season schedule

=== Regular season ===
2015 game log
Total: 8–26 (Home: 7–10; Road: 1–16)
June: 2–7 (Home: 2–3; Road: 0–4)

Game	Date	Team	Score	High points	High rebounds	High assists	Location Attendance	Record
1	June 5	@ Phoenix	L 71–76	Jia Perkins (20)	Danielle Adams (6)	Colson, McBride, Robinson (2)	US Airways Center; 11,789	0–1
2	June	@ Atlanta	L 69–72	Kayla McBride (29)	Appel-Marinelli, Hamby (6)	Danielle Robinson (6)	Philips Arena; 4,308	0–2
3	June 14	Tulsa	L 62–73	Kayla McBride (17)	Jayne Appel-Marinelli (7)	Danielle Robinson (7)	Freeman Coliseum; 7,305	0–3
4	June 16	@ Tulsa	L 61–88	Perkins, Young-Malcolm (20)	Jia Perkins (6)	Danielle Robinson (4)	BOK Center; 5,005	0–4
5	June 19	Minnesota	L 59–74	Jia Perkins (16)	Alexander, Young-Malcolm (5)	Danielle Robinson (5)	Freeman Coliseum; 3,968	0–5
6	June 20	Chicago	L 87–95 (OT)	Danielle Robinson (17)	Sophia Young-Malcolm (11)	Danielle Robinson (6)	Freeman Coliseum; 4,026	0–6
7	June 25	Phoenix	W 76–71	Sophia Young-Malcolm (21)	Dearica Hamby (14)	Danielle Robinson (8)	Freeman Coliseum; 3,102	1–6
8	June 27	Seattle	W 73–71	Kayla McBride (23)	Hamby, Perkins (6)	Danielle Robinson (7)	Freeman Coliseum; 4,067	2–6
9	June 30	@ Phoenix	L 78–85	McBride, Young-Malcolm (18)	Alexander, Hamby (5)	Sydney Colson (8)	US Airways Center; 8,319	2–7

July : 4–6 (Home: 4–1; Road: 0–5)

Game	Date	Team	Score	High points	High rebounds	High assists	Location Attendance	Record
10	July 2	@ Los Angeles	L 81–86	Dearica Hamby (19)	Dearica Hamby (8)	Danielle Robinson (13)	Staples Center; 6,287	2–8
11	July 8	Los Angeles	W 70–63	Danielle Robinson (22)	Appel-Marinelli, Young-Malcolm (7)	Danielle Robinson (8)	Freeman Coliseum; 3,100	3–8
12	July 10	@ Indiana	L 76–83	Sophia Young-Malcolm (27)	Jayne Appel-Marinelli (10)	Dearica Hamby (3)	Bankers Life Fieldhouse; 6,457	3–9
13	July 12	@ Minnesota	L 49–66	Dearica Hamby (13)	Kayla Alexander (11)	Alexander, Logic (3)	Target Center; 8,951	3–10
14	July 15	@ New York	L 68–84	Danielle Robinson (18)	Dearica Hamby (6)	Sydney Colson (4)	Madison Square Garden; 18,617	3–11
15	July 17	Tulsa	W 65–58	Sophia Young-Malcolm (18)	Jayne Appel-Marinelli (9)	Danielle Robinson (3)	Freeman Coliseum; 9,080	4–11
16	July 19	@ Chicago	L 82–93	Danielle Adams (20)	Adams, Hamby (4)	Samantha Logic (5)	Allstate Arena; 5,011	4–12
17	July 21	Indiana	W 80–62	Danielle Robinson (18)	Sophia Young-Malcolm (10)	Colson, McBride, Robinson (4)	Freeman Coliseum; 6,846	5–12
18	July 29	Atlanta	W 102–85	Kayla McBride (25)	Jayne Appel-Marinelli (8)	Danielle Robinson (12)	Freeman Coliseum; 3,613	6–12
19	July 31	Washington	L 53–88	Sophia Young-Malcolm (17)	Sophia Young-Malcolm (7)	Robinson, Young-Malcolm (4)	Freeman Coliseum; 4,311	6–13

August : 1–10 (Home: 1–4; Road: 0–6)

Game	Date	Team	Score	High points	High rebounds	High assists	Location Attendance	Record
20	August 2	Los Angeles	L 80–78	Jia Perkins (24)	Perkins, Young-Malcolm (5)	Appel-Marinelli, McBride, Robinson (3)	Freeman Coliseum; 5,416	6–14
21	August 4	@ Connecticut	L 51–82	Jia Perkins (15)	Jayne Appel-Marinelli (11)	Jayne Appel-Marinelli (4)	Mohegan Sun Arena; 4,490	6–15
22	August 5	@ Washington	L 63–66	Jia Perkins (23)	Jayne Appel-Marinelli (8)	Danielle Robinson (9)	Capital One Arena; 7,078	6–16
23	August 8	Seattle	W 88–81	Jia Perkins (32)	Jayne Appel-Marinelli (8)	Danielle Robinson (8)	Freeman Coliseum; 4,691	7–16
24	August 11	@ Minnesota	L 76–83	Kayla McBride (24)	Appel-Marinelli, Young-Malcolm (10)	Danielle Robinson (9)	Target Center; 8,851	7–17
25	August 16	@ Seattle	L 63–72	Kayla McBride (19)	Jayne Appel-Marinelli (8)	Sophia Young-Malcolm (4)	KeyArena; 5,748	7–18
26	August 19	New York	L 45–73	Kayla McBride (11)	Appel-Marinelli, Young-Malcolm (6)	Sydney Colson (4)	Freeman Coliseum; 3,626	7–19
27	August 21	Minnesota	L 61–78	Jia Perkins (16)	Adams, Colson, Appel-Marinelli, Montgomery, Robinson (4)	Danielle Robinson (6)	Freeman Coliseum; 4,298	7–20
28	August 23	Los Angeles	L 59–90	Kayla McBride (13)	Jayne Appel-Marinelli (9)	Colson, Perkins (4)	Freeman Coliseum; 3,972	7–21
29	August 28	@ Seattle	L 69–83	Sophia Young-Malcolm (18)	Hamby, Appel-Marinelli, Montgomery, Perkins (4)	Kayla McBride (4)	Key Arena; 5,676	7–22
30	August 30	@ Los Angeles	L 52–60	Jia Perkins (15)	Jayne Appel-Marinelli (13)	Danielle Robinson (5)	Staples Center; 19,076	7–23

September : 1–3 (Home: 0–2; Road: 1–1)

Game	Date	Team	Score	High points	High rebounds	High assists	Location Attendance	Record
31	September 4	Connecticut	L 72–73	Kayla McBride (17)	Janye Appel-Marinelli (7)	Sydney Colson (5)	Freeman Coliseum; 4,633	7–24
32	September 5	Phoenix	L 52–82	Ayayi, Young-Malcolm (8)	Alex Montgomery (10)	Samantha Logic (3)	Freeman Coliseum; 6,076	7–25
33	September 8	@ Tulsa	L 64–74	Jia Perkins (24)	Jayne Appel-Marinelli (11)	Sydney Colson (4)	BOK Center; 4,145	7–26
34	September 13	@ Seattle	W 59–58	Dearica Hamby (15)	Valeriane Ayayi (8)	Sydney Colson (6)	KeyArena; 6,256	8–26

2015 season schedule

== Standings ==
Western Conference	W	L	PCT	GB	Home	Road	Conf.
z - Minnesota Lynx	22	12	.647	–	13–4	9–8	16–6
x - Phoenix Mercury	20	14	.588	2	13–4	7–10	15–7
x - Tulsa Shock	18	16	.529	4	12–5	6–11	11–11
x - Los Angeles Sparks	14	20	.412	8	9–8	5–12	10–12
e - Seattle Storm	10	24	.294	12	8–9	2–15	8–14
e - San Antonio Stars	8	26	.235	14	7–10	1–16	6–16

== Statistics ==
Legend
GP	Games played	GS	Games started	MPG	Minutes per game	RPG	Rebounds per game
APG	Assists per game	SPG	Steals per game	BPG	Blocks per game	PPG	Points per game
FG%	Field-goal percentage	3P%	3-point field-goal percentage	FT%	Free-throw percentage	TO	Turnovers per game
PF	Fouls per game		Team leader		League leader

=== Regular season ===
Player	GP	GS	MPG	FG%	3P%	FT%	RPG	APG	SPG	BPG	PPG
Kayla McBride	27	25	28.0	38.2%	37.3%	87.9%	3.1	1.6	1.1	0.1	13.8
Jia Perkins	26	26	27.3	37.6%	27.2%	88.0%	3.0	1.7	1.5	0.3	13.3
Sophia Young-Malcolm	34	29	27.4	45.8%	0.0%	73.8%	5.0	1.4	1.2	0.3	11.5
Danielle Robinson	30	30	30.1	39.0%	0.0%	90.3%	2.5	5.0	0.7	0.1	9.2
Danielle Adams	30	2	16.1	41.4%	32.4%	82.7%	3.3	0.5	0.5	0.3	7.4
Dearica Hamby	31	16	17.4	35.4%	35.3%	64.2%	4.1	0.7	0.4	0.2	6.1
Alex Montgomery	14	3	16.7	37.7%	20.0%	70.0%	4.1	0.7	0.6	0.5	4.9
Kalana Greene	11	6	19.9	36.5%	15.4%	100.0%	2.9	0.7	0.7	0.3	4.4
Sydney Colson	34	5	15.9	41.1%	31.8%	68.6%	1.1	2.8	0.8	0.3	3.5
Jayne Appel-Marinelli	30	28	22.4	38.2%	0.0%	64.7%	6.2	1.4	0.8	1.3	3.3
Kayla Alexander	29	0	12.3	41.6%	—	64.7%	3.3	0.2	0.2	0.8	3.3
Valériane Ayayi	16	0	9.2	31.3%	19.0%	42.9%	1.8	0.4	0.5	0.3	2.3
Samantha Logic	23	0	13.9	26.6%	21.7%	85.7%	1.5	1.3	0.3	0.3	2.0
Brittany Hrynko	5	0	3.0	16.7%	0.0%	—	—	0.2	—	—	0.4
