= Spring Valley Academy =

Location
- Centerville, Ohio; USA; 39°36′54″N 84°08′32″W

Information
- Type: Private, K-12 College Preparatory
- Established: 1968
- Principal: Peter Cousins
- Enrollment: 480
- Colors: Blue & Yellow
- Athletics: Soccer, Volleyball, Basketball, Gymnastics, Cheerleading, Flag Football
- Mascot: Stallions
- Website: www.springvalleyacademy.org

Spring Valley Academy (known locally as "SVA" or "Spring Valley") is a Seventh-day Adventist K-12 private school located in Centerville, Ohio. It is a part of the Seventh-day Adventist education system, the world's second largest Christian school system.

== See also ==
- List of Seventh-day Adventist secondary schools
- Seventh-day Adventist education
