= 2015 New York Liberty season =

19th season

- Head coach: Bill Laimbeer
- Arena: Madison Square Garden

Results
- Record: 23–11 (.676)
- Place: 1st (Eastern)
- Playoff finish: Lost conference finals (1–2) vs Indiana Fever

The 2015 WNBA season, was the 19th season for the New York Liberty of the Women's National Basketball Association. Bill Laimbeer returned as head coach.

They qualified for the playoffs for the first time since missing out in 2013 and 2014. They won the Conference Semifinals against the Washington Mystics, 2-1, but lost the Conference Finals against the Indiana Fever, 1-2, thus eliminating them from the league.

== Transactions ==
=== WNBA draft ===
The following are the Liberty's selections in the 2015 WNBA draft.

Round	Pick	Player	Nationality	School/Team/Country
1	9 (from S.A.)	Brittany Boyd	United States	California
1	11 (from Minn.)	Kiah Stokes	United States	UConn
2	23 (from Minn.)	Amber Orrange	United States	Stanford
3	27 (through Conn.)	Laurin Mincy	United States	Maryland
3	28 (from Minn.)	Michala Johnson	United States	Wisconsin

=== Trades ===
Date	Trade

== Roster ==
2015 New York Liberty roster
Players
Coaches

Pos.	No.	Nat.	Name	Height	Weight	DOB	From
C	31	(United States)	Charles, Tina	6' 4" (1.93m)	198 lb (90kg)	1988-12-05	Connecticut
G	10	(United States)	Prince, Epiphanny	5' 9" (1.75m)	167 lb (76kg)	1988-01-11	Rutgers
G	14	(United States)	Rodgers, Sugar	5' 9" (1.75m)	160 lb (73kg)	1989-12-08	Georgetown
G	30	(United States)	Wright, Tanisha	5' 11" (1.8m)	165 lb (75kg)	1983-11-20	Penn State
G	15	(United States)	Boyd, Brittany	5' 9" (1.75m)	156 lb (71kg)	1993-06-11	California
G/F	17	(United States)	Carson, Essence	6' 0" (1.83m)	165 lb (75kg)	1986-07-28	Rutgers
C	41	(United States)	Stokes, Kiah	6' 3" (1.91m)	190 lb (86kg)	1993-03-30	California
C	8	(United States)	Swords, Carolyn	6' 6" (1.98m)	210 lb (95kg)	1989-07-19	Boston College
G	3	(United States)	Wheeler, Erica	5' 7" (1.7m)	143 lb (65kg)	1991-05-02	Rutgers
F	32	(United States)	Cash, Swin	6' 2" (1.88m)	162 lb (73kg)	1979-09-22	Connecticut
G	9	(Australia)	Allen, Rebecca	6' 1" (1.85m)	164 lb (74kg)	1992-11-06	Victoria (Australia)
G	2	(United States)	Wiggins, Candice	5' 11" (1.8m)	154 lb (70kg)	1987-02-14	Stanford
C	7	(United States)	Warley-Talbert, Avery	6' 3" (1.91m)	202 lb (92kg)	1987-05-17	Liberty

Head coach
(United States) Bill Laimbeer

Legend

- (C) Team captain
- (DP) Unsigned draft pick
- (FA) Free agent
- (S) Suspended
- Injured

== Season standings ==
Eastern Conference	W	L	PCT	GB	Home	Road	Conf.
x - New York Liberty	23	11	.676	–	12–5	11–6	13–9
x - Chicago Sky	21	13	.618	2	13–4	8–9	14–8
x - Indiana Fever	20	14	.588	3	11–6	9–8	13–9
x - Washington Mystics	18	16	.529	5	11–6	7–10	10–12
e - Atlanta Dream	15	19	.441	8	9–8	6–11	10–12
e - Connecticut Sun	15	19	.441	8	8–9	7–10	6–16

== Schedule ==
=== Preseason ===
2015 pre-season game log
Total: 0–0 (home: 0–0; road: 0–0)
Pre-season: 0–3 (Home: 0–1; Road: 0–2)

Game	Date	Team	Score	High points	High rebounds	High assists	Location Attendance	Record
1	May 22	Chicago	L 55–83	Kiah Stokes (11)	Kiah Stokes (11)	Brittany Boyd (2)	Bob Carpenter Center; 3,105	0–1
2	May 27	Atlanta	L 72–85	Tina Charles (12)	Kiah Stokes (11)	Tanisha Wright (5)	Madison Square Garden (14,530)	0–2
3	June 1	@ Minnesota	L 80–85	Tina Charles (19)	Tina Charles (5)	Essence Carson (5)	Target Center; 3,520	0–3

2015 season schedule

=== Regular season ===
2015 game log
Total: 1–1 (home: 1–0; road: 0–1)
June: 1–1 (Home: 1–0; Road: 0–1)

Game	Date	Team	Score	High points	High rebounds	High assists	Location Attendance	Record
1	June 5	Atlanta	W 82–73	Tina Charles (17)	Tina Charles (12)	Tanisha Wright (5)	Madison Square Garden; 8,910	1–0
2	June 6	@ Washington	L 62–67	Tina Charles (18)	Kiah Stokes (9)	Swin Cash (4)	Verizon Center; 7,400	1–1
3	June 9	Indiana	W 86–79	Tina Charles (21)	Kiah Stokes (6)	Tanisha Wright (5)	Madison Square Garden; 5,663	2–1
4	June 11	Phoenix	W 82–73	Tina Charles (19)	Tina Charles (11)	Essence Carson (3)	Madison Square Garden; 5,817	3–1
5	June 14	Washington	L 59–74	Essence Carson (12)	Sugar Rodgers (7)	Sugar Rodgers (5)	Madison Square Garden; 7,629	3–2
6	June 19	Indiana	L 63–80	Tanisha Wright (12)	Tina Charles (8)	Tina Charles (5)	Madison Square Garden; 7,815	3–3

2015 season schedule

=== Playoffs ===
2015 playoff game log
Total: 3–3 (home: 2–2; road: 1–1)
Conference semifinals: 2–1 (Home: 1–1; Road: 1–0)

Game	Date	Team	Score	High points	High rebounds	High assists	Location Attendance	Series
1	September 18	Washington	L 83–86	Epiphanny Prince (26)	Carolyn Swords; Kiah Stokes (9)	Tina Charles (5)	Madison Square Garden; 10,120	0–1
2	September 20	Washington	W 86–68	Tina Charles (22)	Kiah Stokes (7)	Tanisha Wright (6)	Verizon Center; 6,619	1–1
3	September 22	Washington	W 79–74	Tina Charles (22)	Kiah Stokes (13)	Tanisha Wright (5)	Madison Square Garden; 9,255	2–1

Conference finals: 1–2 (Home: 1–1; Road: 0–1)

Game	Date	Team	Score	High points	High rebounds	High assists	Location Attendance	Series
1	September 23	Indiana	W 84–67	Kiah Stokes (21)	Tina Charles (7)	Tina Charles (9)	Madison Square Garden; 7,229	1–0
2	September 27	Indiana	L 64–70	Tina Charles (25)	Kiah Stokes (11)	Tanisha Wright (5)	Bankers Life Fieldhouse; 7,505	1–1
3	September 29	Indiana	L 51–66	Candice Wiggins (15)	Tina Charles (10)	Epiphanny Prince (4)	Madison Square Garden; 10,120	1–2

2015 playoff schedule
