= Freeman Coliseum =

Sports and concert venue located in San Antonio

Coordinates: 29.426899°N 98.439351°W

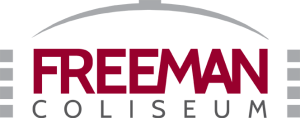

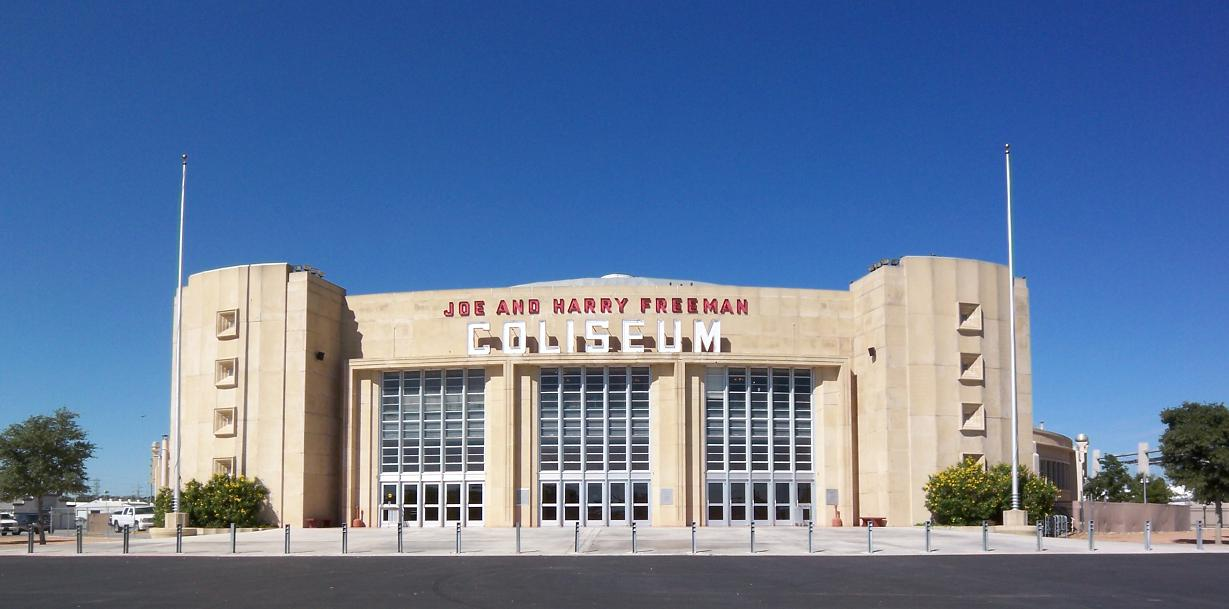
- Interactive map of Freeman Coliseum
- Address: 3201 East Houston Street
- Location: San Antonio, Texas, U.S.
- Owner: Bexar County
- Capacity: 11,700 (concerts, boxing and wrestling); 9,800 (basketball); 9,500 (motor sports, rodeo and professional bull riding)
- Surface: Chilled concrete
- Field size: 294 feet (90 m) wide by 460 feet (140 m) long by 99 feet (30 m) tall

Construction
- Groundbreaking: November 17, 1947
- Opened: October 19, 1949
- Renovated: 1993, 2014
- Cost: $1.75 million
- Architects: Bartlett Cocke, Phelps & Dewews & Simmons, Atlee B. and Robt. M. Ayres

Tenants
- San Antonio Stock Show & Rodeo (PRCA) (1950–2002); San Antonio Iguanas (CHL) (1994–1997, 1998–2002); San Antonio Dragons (IHL) (1996–1998); San Antonio Stars (WNBA) (2015); San Antonio Gunslingers (IFL) (2022–present)

Website
- freemancoliseum.com

Freeman Coliseum is a sports and concert venue located in San Antonio, Texas, United States. In 1958 it was named after philanthropists and brothers Harry and Joe Freeman. It has been host to thousands of events including the San Antonio Stock Show & Rodeo, concerts, trade shows, motor sports, circus, professional sports including professional bull riding, basketball, hockey, boxing and wrestling. It was the largest indoor arena in San Antonio until HemisFair Arena opened in 1968. Since then, many top recording artists have made their San Antonio concert debuts at the Coliseum.

Freeman Coliseum was the home of the San Antonio Stock Show & Rodeo until the opening in 2003 of the adjacent Frost Bank Center, formerly known as SBC Center then AT&T Center. Although the main rodeo event is now in Frost Bank Center, stock show and exhibit aspects of the rodeo are still held in the Coliseum. The 2021 Rodeo was held in the Freeman due to the COVID-19 Pandemic. The Women's National Basketball Association (WNBA) San Antonio Stars played its home games at Freeman Coliseum during the 2015 season due to renovations at AT&T Center. The Coliseum was home to the San Antonio Rowels and its national team rodeo league competition, as well as two professional hockey teams: the Central Hockey League (CHL) San Antonio Iguanas and later, the International Hockey League (IHL) San Antonio Dragons from 1996 to 1998.

On February 26, 1983, the Freeman Coliseum hosted the rematch boxing contest between International Boxing Hall of Fame member Alexis Arguello and Vilomar Fernandez, won by Arguello by ten rounds unanimous decision. Freeman Coliseum was also host to the WWF 1994 Survivor Series starring Chuck Norris in the main event. Additionally, Freeman Coliseum was host to NXT Takeover: San Antonio, for WWE's brand NXT.

On October 7, 2026, President Donald Trump intending to support Republican candidates in Texas, including 2026 Texas Senate candidate Ken Paxton. During the event Trump was repeatedly interrupted by hecklers during the event. BCSO alleged that several hecklers were assaulted by people attending the rally as they were escorted out.

Freeman Coliseum seats 9,500 for motor sports, rodeos and professional bull riding; 9,800 for basketball and up to 11,700 for concerts, boxing and wrestling. It contains a 77-foot (23 m) ceiling height. When used for trade shows, the arena features 31,250 square feet (2,903 m^{2}) of space, plus 129,500 square feet (12,030 m^{2}) of exhibit space in four adjacent exhibit halls—the 60,000-square-foot (6,000 m^{2}) Morris Center, the 36,000-square-foot (3,300 m^{2}) Exhibit Hall #1, the 20,000-square-foot (2,000 m^{2}) Freeman Building and the 13,500-square-foot (1,250 m^{2}) Exhibit Hall #2.
