= Vicki Baugh =

American basketball player (born 1989)

Personal information
- Born: May 21, 1989 (age 37) Sacramento, California, U.S.
- Listed height: 6 ft 4 in (1.93 m)
- Listed weight: 190 lb (86 kg)

Career information
- High school: Sacramento
- College: Tennessee (2007–2012)
- WNBA draft: 2012: 3rd round, 25th overall pick
- Drafted by: Tulsa Shock
- Playing career: 2012–2022
- Position: Forward-center
- Number: 22, 24
- Coaching career: 2023–present

Career history

Playing
- 2014–2015: Tulsa Shock
- 2016: San Antonio Stars

Coaching
- 2023–present: UC Davis (assistant)
- Stats at WNBA.com
- Stats at Basketball Reference
Medals
Women's basketball
Representing the United States
FIBA U18 AmeriCup
Gold medal – first place	2006 United States	Team
FIBA U19 World Championship
Gold medal – first place	2007 Slovakia	Team

Victoria Alexandria Baugh (born May 21, 1989) is an American college basketball assistant coach for the UC Davis Aggies. She is also a former professional basketball player. She played college basketball for the Tennessee Lady Volunteers and was selected by the Tulsa Shock of the Women's National Basketball Association (WNBA) in the third round of the 2012 WNBA draft.

== Early years ==
Baugh was born on May 21, 1989 in Sacramento, California and attended Sacramento High School. In four years on the school's basketball team, she amassed 1,870 points, 1,222 rebounds, 300 blocks, 273 assists, and 208 steals. Graduating in 2007, she held the school record in scoring until it was broken in 2024. Sacramento High School retired Baugh's #22 jersey in 2023. She played for the United States in the 2006 FIBA Under-18 Women's AmeriCup and the 2007 FIBA Under-19 World Championship for Women, helping the U.S. secure gold medals in both. She was additionally named first-team All-American in 2007 by several sources, including USA Today and McDonald's.

== College career ==
Baugh played college basketball for the Tennessee Lady Volunteers. She played in all 38 games as a freshman, averaging 5.3 points and 4.0 rebounds per game. She tore her ACL during Tennessee's victory in the 2008 national championship game against the Stanford Cardinal. Returning from the injury in her sophomore season, Baugh averaged 6.5 points and 7.3 rebounds per game and recorded three double-doubles before suffering a second ACL tear in the same knee. After the injury, she also had surgery to address a meniscus tear, forcing her to miss the next season entirely. She returned in time to play in 24 games of the 2010–2011 season, including in four games of the 2011 NCAA Division I women's basketball tournament, during which she averaged 5.0 points and 4.3 rebounds per game. Returning for a final season with the Volunteers, Baugh played in 35 games, averaging 7.5 points and 6.7 rebounds per game with four double-doubles; she helped Tennessee to three wins in the 2012 NCAA Division I women's basketball tournament before the team was eliminated in the regional finals.

== Professional career ==
Baugh was selected in the third round (25th overall) of the 2012 WNBA draft by the Tulsa Shock. She was waived by the team on May 14, 2012. After another short offseason stint with the Shock in 2013, the Shock signed her again on March 27, 2014. She went on to play two seasons for the Shock. In 2014, she played in 33 games, averaging 2.5 points and 2.9 rebounds per game. She improved in 2015, averaging 5.4 points and 4.1 rebounds per game in 34 games with six starts. In 2016 she joined the San Antonio Stars, averaging 4.0 points and 3.7 rebounds in 11 games.

Baugh also played professional basketball internationally. She spent nine years playing basketball overseas, including in South Korea, Russia, Slovakia, Turkey, and Hungary.

== Coaching career ==
In 2023, Baugh joined Jennifer Gross's coaching staff as an assistant coach of the UC Davis Aggies.

== Career statistics ==
Legend
GP	Games played	GS	Games started	MPG	Minutes per game	RPG	Rebounds per game
APG	Assists per game	SPG	Steals per game	BPG	Blocks per game	PPG	Points per game
TO	Turnovers per game	FG%	Field-goal percentage	3P%	3-point field-goal percentage	FT%	Free-throw percentage
**Bold**	Career best	°	League leader

*	Denotes season(s) in which Bickle won an NCAA Championship

=== WNBA ===
WNBA regular season
Year	Team	GP	GS	MPG	FG%	3P%	FT%	RPG	APG	SPG	BPG	TO	PPG
2014	Tulsa	33	0	8.1	**.589**	–	.727	2.9	0.2	0.3	0.2	0.5	2.5
2015	Tulsa	**34**	**6**	**15.7**	.473	.000	**.738**	**4.1**	**0.6**	**0.5**	**0.4**	**1.3**	**5.4**
2016	San Antonio	11	0	13.5	.576	–	.667	3.7	0.3	0.4	0.3	**1.3**	4.0
**Career**	3 years, 2 teams	78	6	12.1	.515	.000	.728	3.5	0.4	0.4	0.3	0.9	4.0

WNBA playoffs statistics
Year	Team	GP	GS	MPG	FG%	3P%	FT%	RPG	APG	SPG	BPG	TO	PPG
2015	Tulsa	2	0	16.0	.286	–	–	3.0	0.0	0.5	0.0	1.0	2.0

=== College ===
NCAA statistics
Year	Team	GP	GS	MPG	FG%	3P%	FT%	RPG	APG	SPG	BPG	TO	PPG
2007–08*	Tennessee	**38**	–	13.1	.552	–	**.778**	4.0	0.6	0.5	0.8	1.7	5.3
2008–09	Tennessee	14	–	19.1	.456	–	.613	**7.3**	0.9	0.6	**1.5**	1.8	6.5
2009–10	Tennessee	0	0	Did not play due to injury									
2010–11	Tennessee	24	1	9.3	.493	.000	.760	3.2	0.3	0.3	0.6	**1.4**	3.6
2011–12	Tennessee	35	**19**	**21.4**	**.577**	**.333**	.708	6.7	**1.2**	**0.7**	0.9	1.9	**7.5**
**Career**		111	20	15.6	.537	.250	.720	5.1	0.8	0.5	0.8	1.7	5.8
