= Brianna Kiesel =

American basketball player (born 1993)

Personal information
- Born: July 8, 1993 (age 33) Utica, New York
- Listed height: 5 ft 7 in (1.70 m)
- Listed weight: 125 lb (57 kg)

Career information
- High school: Thomas R. Proctor (Utica, New York)
- College: Pittsburgh (2011–2015)
- WNBA draft: 2015: 2nd round, 13th overall pick
- Drafted by: Tulsa Shock
- Playing career: 2015–2021
- Position: Point guard

Career history
- 2015–2016: Tulsa Shock / Dallas Wings
- 2017: Atlanta Dream
- 2019–2021: Artego Bydgoszcz
- Stats at Basketball Reference

Brianna Kiesel (born July 8, 1993) is an American former professional basketball player. In June 2021 she was named Assistant Women's Basketball Coach for her alma mater, Pitt.

== College ==
Kiesel is the Pittsburgh Panthers' all-time leader in minutes played and fifth all-time leader in points and assists. She, along with Shavonte Zellous are the only two Panthers to be selected in the WNBA draft.

== Professional career ==
She has a career 31.5% of Field Goals, 22.4% 3-point average, and 3.8 points per game.

== Career statistics ==
Legend
GP	Games played	GS	Games started	MPG	Minutes per game	RPG	Rebounds per game
APG	Assists per game	SPG	Steals per game	BPG	Blocks per game	PPG	Points per game
TO	Turnovers per game	FG%	Field-goal percentage	3P%	3-point field-goal percentage	FT%	Free-throw percentage
**Bold**	Career best	°	League leader

=== WNBA ===
==== Regular season ====
WNBA regular season statistics
Year	Team	GP	GS	MPG	FG%	3P%	FT%	RPG	APG	SPG	BPG	TO	PPG
2015	Tulsa	**34**	**15**	**18.1**	**.333**	**.231**	**.755**	**0.8**	**1.9**	**0.8**	**0.1**	1.2	**5.1**
2016	Dallas	14	0	7.4	.174	.167	.750	0.4	1.3	0.4	0.0	0.7	0.9
2017	Atlanta	9	0	8.3	.200	.111	.700	0.4	1.0	0.3	**0.1**	**0.1**	1.6
**Career**	3 years, 2 teams	57	15	13.9	.307	.209	.746	0.7	1.6	0.6	0.1	0.9	3.5

==== Playoffs ====
WNBA playoff statistics
Year	Team	GP	GS	MPG	FG%	3P%	FT%	RPG	APG	SPG	BPG	TO	PPG
2015	Tulsa	2	0	16.5	.214	.000	1.000	2.5	0.5	0.0	0.0	1.0	6.0
**Career**	1 year, 1 team	2	0	16.5	.214	.000	1.000	2.5	0.5	0.0	0.0	1.0	6.0

=== College ===
NCAA statistics
Year	Team	GP	Points	FG%	3P%	FT%	RPG	APG	SPG	BPG	PPG
2011–12	Pittsburgh	30	408	35.2%	20.9%	70.2%	3.4	3.0	1.2	0.0	13.6
2012–13	Pittsburgh	30	448	34.1%	25.6%	80.0%	4.7	3.0	1.5	**0.3**	14.9
2013–14	Pittsburgh	30	492	39.0%	27.6%	82.5%	**5.3**	3.7	1.6	0.1	16.4
2014–15	Pittsburgh	**32**	**590**	**39.9%**	**34.2%**	**83.7%**	5.0	**4.5**	**2.1**	0.1	**18.4**
**Career**		122	1938	37.0%	28.3%	79.5%	4.6	3.5	1.6	0.1	15.9

== Personal life ==
Kiesel completed two bachelor's degrees.
