= Shae Kelley =

American basketball player (born 1991)

No. 1 – Montañeras de Morovis
- Position: Forward
- League: BSNF

Personal information
- Born: September 29, 1991 (age 35) Denver, Colorado, U.S.
- Listed height: 6 ft 1 in (1.85 m)
- Listed weight: 166 lb (75 kg)

Career information
- High school: East (Denver, Colorado)
- College: Northwest Florida State (2011–2012); Old Dominion (2012–2014); Minnesota (2014–2015)
- WNBA draft: 2015: 3rd round, 35th overall pick
- Drafted by: Minnesota Lynx
- Playing career: 2015–present

Career history
- 2015: Minnesota Lynx
- 2016–present: Montañeras de Morovis

Career highlights
- WNBA champion (2015); First-team All-Big Ten (2015); First-team All-CUSA (2014); CAA All-Defensive Team (2013)
- Stats at WNBA.com
- Stats at Basketball Reference

Shae Kelley (born September 29, 1991) is an American professional women's basketball player who recently played for the Minnesota Lynx of the Women's National Basketball Association for the 2015 season. She signed with the team on August 11, 2015.

== Old Dominion and Minnesota statistics ==
Legend
GP	Games played	GS	Games started	MPG	Minutes per game
FG%	Field goal percentage	3P%	3-point field goal percentage	FT%	Free throw percentage
RPG	Rebounds per game	APG	Assists per game	SPG	Steals per game
BPG	Blocks per game	PPG	Points per game	**Bold**	Career high

Year	Team	GP	Points	FG%	3P%	FT%	RPG	APG	SPG	BPG	PPG
2012–13	Old Dominion	31	417	**49.7%**	0.0%	56.2%	8.5	1.9	**2.4**	1.2	13.5
2013–14	Old Dominion	**34**	**605**	46.8%	12.9%	62.9%	**9.7**	**2.4**	1.8	1.2	**17.8**
2014–15	Minnesota	33	578	48.6%	**17.6%**	**63.6%**	9.4	1.6	1.7	0.8	17.5
Career		98	1763	48.2%	13.7%	61.4%	9.2	2.0	1.9	1.1	18.0

== WNBA career statistics ==
†	Denotes seasons in which Kelley won a WNBA championship

=== Regular season ===
Year	Team	GP	GS	MPG	FG%	3P%	FT%	RPG	APG	SPG	BPG	TO	PPG
2015^{†}	Minnesota	8	0	2.4	.000	.000	.500	0.4	0.1	0.1	0.0	0.1	0.1
Career	1 year, 1 team	8	0	2.4	.000	.000	.500	0.4	0.1	0.1	0.0	0.1	0.1

=== Postseason ===
Year	Team	GP	GS	MPG	FG%	3P%	FT%	RPG	APG	SPG	BPG	TO	PPG
2015^{†}	Minnesota	1	0	0.0	.000	.000	.000	0.0	0.0	0.0	0.0	0.0	0.0
Career	1 year, 1 team	1	0	0.0	.000	.000	.000	0.0	0.0	0.0	0.0	0.0	0.0
