= Hryn =

Hryn (Ukrainian: Гринь) is a Ukrainian surname. Notable people with the surname include:

- Serhiy Hryn (footballer) (born 1994), Ukrainian footballer
- Serhiy Hryn (rower) (born 1981), Ukrainian rower

== See also ==
- Grin (surname)
- Hrynko, Hrytsko, Hrynchuk, Hryshchuk, Hryniuk , Hrynchyshyn
