= Amanda Zahui B. =

Swedish basketball player (born 1993)

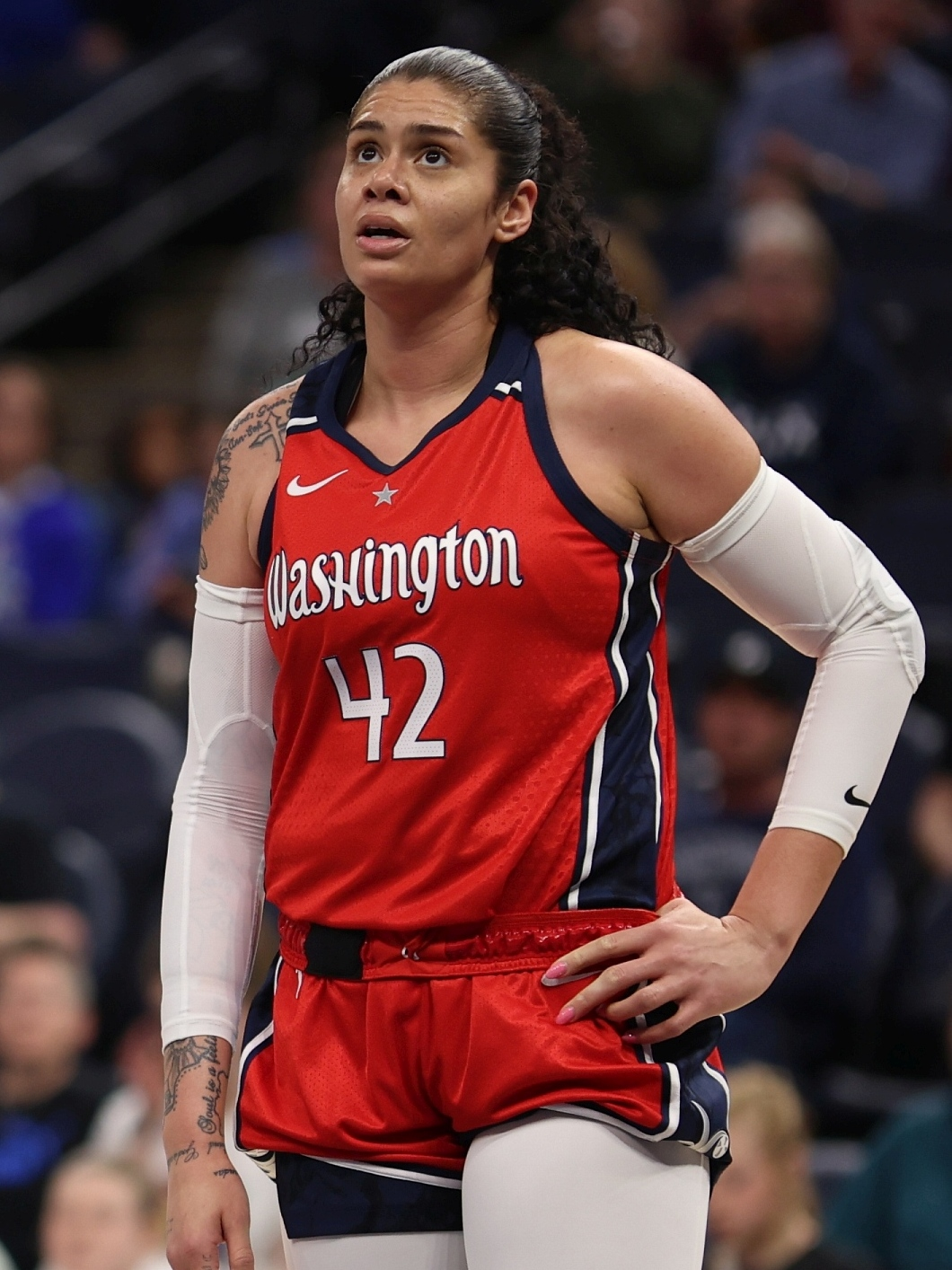
- Zahui with the Washington Mystics in 2023

BK Žabiny Brno
- Position: Center
- League: Czech Women's Basketball League

Personal information
- Born: 8 September 1993 (age 33) Stockholm, Sweden
- Listed height: 6 ft 4 in (1.93 m)
- Listed weight: 184 lb (83 kg)

Career information
- High school: Igelstavikens Gymnasium (Södertälje, Sweden)
- College: Minnesota (2013–2015)
- WNBA draft: 2015: 1st round, 2nd overall pick
- Drafted by: Tulsa Shock
- Playing career: 2009–present

Career history
- 2009–2012: Telge Basket
- 2015: Tulsa Shock
- 2015–2016: Adana ASKİ
- 2016–2020: New York Liberty
- 2016–2017: Nadezhda Orenburg
- 2017–2018: USK Praha
- 2018–2019: Sopron Basket
- 2019–2020: Shandong Six Stars
- 2020: Hatay BB
- 2020–2021: Dynamo Kursk
- 2021–2022: Los Angeles Sparks
- 2021–2022: Fenerbahçe
- 2022–2023: Beretta Famila Schio
- 2023: Washington Mystics
- 2023: Indiana Fever
- 2023–2024: Townsville Fire
- 2024: Polkowice
- 2025: BC Castelnuovo Scrivia
- 2025–present: BK Žabiny Brno

Career highlights
- Italian League champion (2023); Italian Supercup winner (2023); Turkish League champion (2022); Hungarian League champion (2019); Hungarian Cup winner (2019); Czech League champion (2018); 2× Damligan champion (2011, 2012); All-American – WBCA Coaches', USBWA (2015); First-team All-American – AP (2015); Big Ten co-Player of the Year (2015); Big Ten Freshman of the Year (2014); 2× Big Ten All-Defensive Team (2014, 2015); 2× First-team All-Big Ten (2014, 2015); Big Ten All-Freshman Team (2014)
- Stats at Basketball Reference

Amanda Agnes Sofia Zahui Bazoukou (born 8 September 1993), known professionally as Amanda Zahui B., is a Swedish basketball player for BK Žabiny Brno of the Czech Women's Basketball League. After playing basketball both in Sweden and collegiately with the Minnesota Golden Gophers, Zahui was drafted by the Tulsa Shock with the second overall pick in the 2015 WNBA draft.

== Early life ==
Zahui grew up in Stockholm, Sweden, where her parents met. Ann-Sofi Zahui Bazoukou grew up in Spain and France before moving to Stockholm, whereas Alex Zahui Bazoukou left his native Ivory Coast to seek work in Europe. The family lived in neighbourhoods heavily populated by African immigrants.

Zahui grew up playing soccer and tennis, as well as singing in the choir and taking theater lessons. She began playing basketball at age 10. By age 13, she was added to Sweden's 16-and-under national team. She averaged 15 points and eight rebounds for the Swedish national team in the Under-18 European Championships in 2011.

Zahui attended Igelstavikens Gymnasium in Södertälje. She played three seasons in the Damligan for Telge Basket between 2009 and 2012.

Upon moving to the United States, she shortened Bazoukou to an initial so it would fit on her jersey and be easier to pronounce.

== College career ==
Zahui joined the Minnesota Golden Gophers in 2012 but redshirted the 2012–13 season. She played two seasons for the Golden Gophers between 2013 and 2015. She was named Big Ten Player of the Year by the media for the 2014–15 season.

In February 2015, she scored a career-high 39 points in a game against Iowa. She also recorded 29 rebounds in that game, the most ever by a player in the Big Ten Conference. The last NBA player to record at least 39 points and 29 rebounds in a game was Moses Malone in October 1979.

== Professional career ==
=== WNBA ===
Zahui was drafted second overall by the Tulsa Shock in the 2015 WNBA draft. After one season with Tulsa, she joined the New York Liberty, where she played five seasons between 2016 and 2020.

Zahui joined the Los Angeles Sparks in 2021. She was placed on the full-season suspended list by the Sparks in 2022, meaning she did not get paid and her salary was not on the team's cap sheet, but her rights were retained by the Sparks. It was done due to her overseas commitments potentially keeping her away for a large portion of the season.

On 21 January 2023, Zahui was traded to the Las Vegas Aces in exchange for Dearica Hamby. On 5 February 2023, she was traded again, this time to the Washington Mystics in exchange for two second-round picks. She signed with the team two days later.

On 4 July 2023, Zahui was traded to the Indiana Fever in exchange for Queen Egbo.

=== Overseas ===
For the 2015–16 season, Zahui joined Adana ASKİ in Turkey.

Zahui joined Russian team Nadezhda Orenburg for the 2016–17 season. The "Zahui" name was the cause of many jokes in the Russian language, which led to her changing her name to Bazoukou in March 2017. She earned the Russian League's best forward award.

Zahui played for USK Praha in Czech Republic in 2017–18 and Sopron Basket in Hungary in 2018–19. She played the majority of the 2019–20 season in China with Shandong Six Stars before having a one-game stint in Turkey with Hatay BB. She returned to Russia for the 2020–21 season, playing for Dynamo Kursk. She returned to Turkey for a third time in 2021–22 with Fenerbahçe and then played for Beretta Famila Schio in Italy in 2022–23.

Zahui was set to play for Israeli Division 1 club Maccabi Bnot Ashdod in the 2023–24 season, but she fled the country after Hamas attacked Israel on 7 October 2023.

In December 2023, Zahui joined the Townsville Fire of the Women's National Basketball League (WNBL) in Australia for the rest of the 2023–24 season.

During the 2024–25 season, she played from October to November 2024 for Polkowice in Poland, and from January 2025 for BC Castelnuovo Scrivia in Italy.

For the 2025–26 season, she joined BK Žabiny Brno of the Czech Women's Basketball League.

== Career statistics ==
Legend
GP	Games played	GS	Games started	MPG	Minutes per game	RPG	Rebounds per game
APG	Assists per game	SPG	Steals per game	BPG	Blocks per game	PPG	Points per game
TO	Turnovers per game	FG%	Field-goal percentage	3P%	3-point field-goal percentage	FT%	Free-throw percentage
**Bold**	Career best	°	League leader

=== WNBA ===
==== Regular season ====
Year	Team	GP	GS	MPG	FG%	3P%	FT%	RPG	APG	SPG	BPG	TO	PPG
2015	Tulsa	31	0	9.7	.361	.333	.750	2.4	0.3	0.2	0.6	0.6	3.4
2016	New York	**33**	1	11.3	.449	.118	.787	3.2	0.4	0.3	0.7	1.1	5.0
2017	New York	29	0	5.3	.400	.250	.750	1.1	0.3	0.2	0.2	0.5	2.2
2018	New York	29	0	15.9	**.500**	**.344**	.605	3.0	0.7	0.4	0.4	1.6	7.7
2019	New York	24	**23**	23.3	.468	.319	**.852**	6.3	0.9	**1.1**	**1.4**	1.3	8.6
2020	New York	21	20	**25.3**	.353	.340	.694	**8.5**	**1.9**	0.9	1.2	2.6	9.0
2021	Los Angeles	30	27	23.8	.429	.280	.767	5.1	1.0	0.6	1.2	1.8	**9.2**
2023	Washington	12	1	7.8	.250	.214	.750	1.4	0.3	0.3	0.6	**0.4**	2.0
2023	Indiana	22	0	7.3	.261	.130	.750	1.0	0.3	0.1	0.5	0.5	1.5
Career	8 years, 5 teams	231	72	14.5	.418	.300	.743	3.5	0.7	0.4	0.7	1.2	5.6

==== Playoffs ====
Year	Team	GP	GS	MPG	FG%	3P%	FT%	RPG	APG	SPG	BPG	TO	PPG
2015	Tulsa	**2**	0	**6.0**	.000	.000	–	1.5	0.0	0.0	**0.5**	0.0	0.0
2016	New York	1	0	**6.0**	**1.000**	–	–	**2.0**	0.0	0.0	0.0	0.0	**2.0**
2017	New York	1	0	1.0	–	–	–	1.0	0.0	0.0	0.0	0.0	0.0
Career	3 years, 2 teams	4	0	4.8	.250	.000	–	1.5	0.0	0.0	0.3	0.0	0.5

=== College ===
Year	Team	GP	Points	FG%	3P%	FT%	RPG	APG	SPG	BPG	PPG
2013-14	Minnesota	**34**	514	54.3%	**33.3%**	65.4%	11.6	**1.4**	0.7	3.1	15.1
2014-15	Minnesota	33	**621**	**55.5%**	26.1%	**78.3%**	**12.9**	1.1	**1.4**	**4.1**	**18.8**
Career		67	1135	54.9%	26.9%	72.8%	12.2	1.3	1.0	3.6	16.9

== Personal life ==
On June 7, 2021, WNBA.com published an op-ed written by Zahui, titled "What Does Pride Mean to Me?", in commemoration of Pride Month. Zahui described herself as having a "personal journey of finding myself", and publicly came out as a lesbian. She wrote, "I celebrate my body, my mind and my sexuality. I am confident and open to the fact that I was made to love women. I was created to celebrate the beautiful women on this earth. To love the most powerful creature on this earth, the woman." Zahui stated that she has a family who has "always been accepting and supportive" regarding her sexuality.

As of January 2024, Zahui's partner is English footballer, Shameeka Fishley.
