= Ally Malott =

American basketball player (born 1992)

Personal information
- Born: October 31, 1992 (age 34) Middletown, Ohio
- Listed height: 6 ft 4 in (1.93 m)
- Listed weight: 183 lb (83 kg)

Career information
- High school: Madison (Middletown, Ohio)
- College: Dayton (2011–2015)
- WNBA draft: 2015: 1st round, 8th overall pick
- Drafted by: Washington Mystics
- Playing career: 2015–present
- Position: Power forward

Career history
- 2015–2016: Washington Mystics
- 2015–2016: Botaş SK
- 2016–2017: Dandenong Rangers
- 2017-2018: TTT Riga
- 2018-2019: Townsville Fire

Career highlights
- LSBL champion (2017); 2x First-team All-Atlantic 10 (2014, 2015); Atlantic-10 All-Freshman Team (2012); McDonald's All-American (2011)
- Stats at WNBA.com
- Stats at Basketball Reference
Medals
Representing United States
Women's basketball
FIBA Under-18 Americas Championship
Gold medal – first place	2010 United States	Team

Allyson "Ally" Malott-McCarthy (born October 31, 1992) is an American former basketball player who played for the Washington Mystics of the Women's National Basketball Association (WNBA). She was drafted eighth overall in the 2015 WNBA draft.

== High school career ==
Malott played for the Madison High Mohawks. She was a McDonald's All American in her senior season as she averaged 21.8 points, 9.5 rebounds, 4.8 assists, 3.2 steals and 2.4 blocks per game while shooting 81% from the free throw line and leading Madison to a 20–4 record and to the Division III district final. This earned her the 2010–11 Ohio Gatorade Player of the Year for girls' basketball. She finished her high school career as Madison's all-time leading scorer.

Malott had offers from Notre Dame, Purdue, Miami, and Northwestern. She chose to play for Dayton, as it was closer to home, and they had also been recruiting her friend Andrea Hoover.

== College career ==
In her rookie season, Malott made the 2012 Atlantic 10 All-Freshman Team.

During the 2014–15 NCAA Division I women's basketball season, Malott shot 41.3% from the three-point line while also averaging 15.5 points and 7.8 rebounds. She also got Dayton to the Elite Eight, where they lost to the eventual champion UConn Huskies.

In her time at Dayton, Malott led them to four straight NCAA tournament appearances, extending their streak to six overall. She averaged 11.8 points and 6.5 rebounds per game. She finished seventh in the program's all-time scoring leaderboard with 1,504 points, and eighth overall in all-time rebounding with 804. In 2022, Malott and Hoover were inducted into Dayton’s Athletics Hall of Fame.

== Professional career ==
=== Washington Mystics ===
Malott was selected eighth overall by the Washington Mystics in the 2015 WNBA draft. She and Hoover became the first women from the University of Dayton to be drafted into the WNBA. She also became the second-highest draftee in either the men's or women's program (behind only John Horan, who was selected fifth overall selection in the 1955 NBA draft). In her rookie season, she played a supporting role on the team. Although she only averaged 3.3 points (with a career-high of 13 points), she 43.3% from the three-point line.

Malott started her second season with Washington getting injured twice, once before training camp and once during their season opener. The Mystics waived her in May 2017.

In two seasons with the Mystics, Malott's career field goal percentage was 38.3%, free throws 81.0%, and she averaged 2.7 points per game.

=== Botaş SK ===
During the WNBA off-season after her rookie season, Malott spent two months overseas in Turkey.

=== Dandenong Rangers ===
During her second WNBA season, Malott played with the Dandenong Rangers in Australia. She averaged 9.9 points, 3.9 rebounds and 1.4 assists per game as the Rangers reached the Grand Final series only to be swept by the Sydney Flames.

=== TTT Riga ===
After getting waived by the Washington Mystics, Malott signed with TTT Riga. She was able to win a title with the team.

=== Townsville Fire ===
After her season in Latvia, Mallott returned to Australia in 2018 this time to play for the Townsville Fire, who had won the championship the season prior. She won Player of the Week twice that season.

== Career statistics ==
Legend
GP	Games played	GS	Games started	MPG	Minutes per game	RPG	Rebounds per game
APG	Assists per game	SPG	Steals per game	BPG	Blocks per game	PPG	Points per game
TO	Turnovers per game	FG%	Field-goal percentage	3P%	3-point field-goal percentage	FT%	Free-throw percentage
**Bold**	Career best	°	League leader

=== WNBA ===
==== Regular season ====
WNBA regular season statistics
Year	Team	GP	GS	MPG	FG%	3P%	FT%	RPG	APG	SPG	BPG	TO	PPG
2015	Washington	**24**	0	**9.0**	**.439**	**.407**	.800	1.0	0.3	0.1	**0.1**	0.6	**3.3**
2016	Washington	23	0	7.8	.306	.313	**.818**	**1.1**	**0.4**	**0.3**	**0.1**	**0.5**	2.1
**Career**	2 years, 1 team	47	0	8.4	.383	.356	.810	1.0	0.4	0.2	0.1	0.6	2.7

==== Playoffs ====
WNBA playoff statistics
Year	Team	GP	GS	MPG	FG%	3P%	FT%	RPG	APG	SPG	BPG	TO	PPG
2015	Washington	2	0	2.5	1.000	1.000	—	0.0	0.5	0.0	0.0	0.0	2.5
**Career**	1 year, 1 team	2	0	2.5	1.000	1.000	—	0.0	0.5	0.0	0.0	0.0	2.5

=== College ===
NCAA statistics
Year	Team	GP	Points	FG%	3P%	FT%	RPG	APG	SPG	BPG	PPG
2011–12	Dayton	30	183	41.4%	30.2%	77.4%	3.3	0.8	0.7	0.5	6.1
2012–13	Dayton	31	332	43.3%	33.3%	71.9%	6.6	1.9	1.0	0.8	10.7
2013–14	Dayton	31	447	48.0%	35.9%	**82.4%**	**8.1**	**2.3**	**1.2**	**1.1**	14.4
2014–15	Dayton	**35**	**542**	**51.0%**	**41.3%**	82.2%	7.8	1.6	0.9	0.8	**15.5**
**Career**		127	1504	46.9%	35.8%	79.7%	6.5	1.6	0.9	0.8	11.8

== Personal life ==
Malott married Andy McCarthy, an assistant basketball coach at Bishop Fenwick High. The couple lives in Franklin Township.

Malott graduated from the University of Dayton where she studied exercise science. In 2019, she was promoted as the director of the aquatics program at the Middletown Atrium YMCA. In 2022, she was inducted into the Butler County Sports Hall of Fame alongside Andrea Hoover.
