= 2015 Tulsa Shock season =

- Head coach: Fred Williams
- Arena: BOK Center

Results
- Record: 18–16 (.529)
- Place: 3rd (Western)
- Playoff finish: Lost in Conference Semifinals

Media
- Television: ESPN2, ABC, NBA TV

The 2015 WNBA season was the sixth and final season that the Tulsa Shock of the WNBA spent in Tulsa. It was the franchise's eighteenth overall season, as they played twelve seasons as the Detroit Shock. It was announced on July 20 that the team would be moving to Dallas during the offseason. Their season began on June 5, on the road against the Minnesota Lynx. The Shock lost that game 75–83, but their fortunes quickly turned around as they went on an eight-game winning streak after their opening night loss. During the streak, they got revenge on Minnesota, defeated San Antonio and Seattle twice each, and won three games by double-digits. The streak came to an end on June 30 in Seattle with a 74–69 loss. They finished June with an 8–2 record. July would prove to be a turn of fortune for the team. Skylar Diggins won Western Conference Player of the Week and Western Conference Player of the Month during the opening month, but tore her ACL on July 1, and was out for the rest of the season. After the injury, the Shock would lose their first two games of July. They would defeat Atlanta and Los Angeles to sit at 10–4 overall. However, form there, the team lost its next five straight games, with only their July 20 loss against Phoenix coming by double-digits. They finished the month 2–7 and were hovering around a .500 record. Their losing streak extended for another five games to begin August. They lost an overtime game against Phoenix and lost by double-digits to Los Angeles during the streak. The team used four home games at the end of the month, to build a five game winning streak to end the month. Their first win came on August 15 against New York. They continued the streak with an overtime win over Connecticut and they defeated Phoenix and Los Angeles by double digits during the run. They ended the month 5–5. They began September with an 85–67 win over Seattle, but ended their winning streak with a 92–73 loss to Los Angeles. They defeated San Antonio and Phoenix but lost to Chicago to end September 3–2 and the regular the season 18–16. This was the first winning season for the franchise in Tulsa.

Their first winning season also earned them their first playoff berth in Tulsa. They were the third seed in the Western Conference and faced Phoenix in the First Round. The Mercury won the regular season match-up between the two teams 3–2. Phoenix won the first game at home 88–55, in a blowout. The Shock could not stave off elimination at home, losing their only playoff game in Tulsa 91–67. A highlight of the season was Courtney Paris leading the league with 9.3 rebounds per game.

== Transactions ==
=== WNBA draft ===
Round	Pick	Player	Nationality	School/Team/Country
1	2	Amanda Zahui B.	Sweden	University of Minnesota
2	13	Brianna Kiesel	United States	Pittsburgh
3	25	Mimi Mungedi	Gabon	Nevada

=== Trades/Roster Changes ===
Date	Trade
February 2	Signed Courtney Paris
February 5	Signed Karima Christmas-Kelly

== Roster ==
2015 Tulsa Shock roster
Players
Coaches

Pos.	No.	Nat.	Name	Height	Weight	DOB	From	Yrs
F	24	(United States)	Baugh, Vicki	6' 4" (1.93m)	190 lb (86kg)	1989-05-21	Tennessee	1
G/F	13	(United States)	Christmas-Kelly, Karima	6' 0" (1.83m)	209 lb (95kg)	1989-09-11	Duke	4
G	4	(United States)	Diggins, Skylar (injured)	5' 9" (1.75m)	140 lb (64kg)	1990-08-02	Notre Dame	2
F	35	(United States)	Hooper, Jordan	6' 2" (1.88m)	185 lb (84kg)	1992-02-20	Nebraska	1
F	33	(United States)	Jackson-Jones, Tiffany	6' 3" (1.91m)	185 lb (84kg)	1985-04-26	Texas	7
F	25	(United States)	Johnson, Glory (Maternity Leave)	6' 3" (1.91m)	170 lb (77kg)	1990-07-27	Tennessee	3
G	1	(United States)	Kiesel, Brianna	5' 7" (1.7m)	125 lb (57kg)	1993-07-08	Pittsburgh	R
C	3	(United States)	Paris, Courtney	6' 4" (1.93m)	250 lb (113kg)	1987-09-21	Oklahoma	5
F/C	22	(United States)	Pierson, Plenette	6' 2" (1.88m)	195 lb (88kg)	1981-08-31	Texas Tech	12
F	55	(United States)	Plaisance, Theresa	6' 5" (1.96m)	200 lb (91kg)	1992-05-18	LSU	1
G	0	(United States)	Sims, Odyssey	5' 8" (1.73m)	155 lb (70kg)	1992-07-13	Baylor	1
G	2	(United States)	Williams, Riquna	5' 7" (1.7m)	165 lb (75kg)	1990-05-28	Miami (FL)	3
C	32	(Sweden)	Zahui B., Amanda	6' 5" (1.96m)	184 lb (83kg)	1993-09-08	Minnesota	R

Head coach
(United States) Fred Williams (Boise State)
Assistant coaches
(United States) Bridget Pettis (Florida)
(United States) Ed Baldwin (North Carolina Central)
Athletic trainer
(United States) Allison Russell (Tulsa)
Strength and conditioning coach
(United States) Claus Souza (Tulsa)

Legend

- (C) Team captain
- (DP) Unsigned draft pick
- (FA) Free agent
- (S) Suspended
- Injured

== Game log ==
=== Preseason ===
2015 pre-season game log
May: 2–0 (Home: 1–0; Road: 1–0)

Game	Date	Team	Score	High points	High rebounds	High assists	Location Attendance	Record
1	May 22	San Antonio	W 81–51	Skylar Diggins (15)	Courtney Paris (9)	Odyssey Sims (5)	BOK Center; 2,937	1–0
2	May 28	@ San Antonio	W 79–71	Riquna Williams (18)	Courtney Paris (10)	Brianna Kiesel (5)	Freeman Coliseum; 3,822	2–0

2015 pre-season schedule

=== Regular season ===
2015 game log
Total: 18–16 (Home: 12–5; Road: 6–11)
June: 8–2 (Home: 5–0; Road: 3–2)

Game	Date	Team	Score	High points	High rebounds	High assists	Location Attendance	Record
1	June 5	@ Minnesota	L 75–83	Plenette Pierson (18)	Courtney Paris (10)	Odyssey Sims (7)	Target Center; 9,020	0–1
2	June 6	Chicago	W 101–93	Odyssey Sims (23)	Courtney Paris (9)	Skylar Diggins (8)	BOK Center; 7,256	1–1
3	June 9	Seattle	W 68–45	Pierson, Sims (12)	Courtney Paris (11)	Skylar Diggins (5)	BOK Center; 4,149	2–1
4	June 14	@ San Antonio	W 73–62	Skylar Diggins (21)	Courtney Paris (19)	Plenette Pierson (3)	Freeman Coliseum; 7,305	3–1
5	June 16	San Antonio	W 88–61	Plenette Pierson (20)	Courtney Paris (13)	Brianna Kiesel (8)	BOK Center; 5,005	4–1
6	June 19	@ Washington	W 86–82	Plenette Pierson (24)	Courtney Paris (14)	Skylar Diggins (5)	Capital One Arena; 7,099	5–1
7	June 21	@ Minnesota	W 86–78	Skylar Diggins (26)	Courtney Paris (11)	Skylar Diggins (8)	Target center 8,823	6–1
8	June 26	New York	W 71–62	Riquna Williams (11)	Karima Christmas-Kelly (6)	Diggins, Williams (4)	BOK Center; 5,125	7–1
9	June 28	Seattle	W 93–89	Skylar Diggins (31)	Christmas-Kelly, Paris (9)	Skylar Diggins (6)	BOK Center; 4,985	8–1
10	June 30	@ Seattle	L 69–74	Riquna Williams (23)	Courtney Paris (7)	Brianna Kiesel (5)	KeyArena; 4,352	8–2

July : 2–7 (Home: 1–3; Road: 1–4)

Game	Date	Team	Score	High points	High rebounds	High assists	Location Attendance	Record
11	July 2	@ Phoenix	L 55–86	Karima Christmas-Kelly (11)	Karima Christmas-Kelly (10)	Karima Christmas-Kelly (4)	US Airways Center; 8,996	8–3
12	July 3	@ Los Angeles	L 95–98	Karima Christmas-Kelly (20)	Courtney Paris (10)	Plenette Pierson (5)	Staples Center; 6,358	8–4
13	July 7	@ Atlanta	W 85–75	Plenette Pierson (24)	Courtney Paris (10)	Kiesel, Paris (4)	Philips Arena; 6,744	9–4
14	July 11	Los Angeles	W 82–67	Karima Christmas-Kelly (24)	Courtney Paris (6)	Odyssey Sims (6)	BOK Center; 6,144	10–4
15	July 15	@ Indiana	L 80–83	Riquna Williams (31)	Courntey Paris (8)	Plenette Pierson (4)	Bankers Life Fieldhouse; 6,435	10–5
16	July 17	@ San Antonio	L 58–65	Odyssey Sims (14)	Baugh, Paris (6)	Riquna Williams (3)	Freeman Coliseum; 9,080	10–6
17	July 19	Minnesota	L 72–79	Riquna Williams (19)	Paris, Sims (7)	Sims, Williams (4)	BOK Center; 5,987	10–7
18	July 21	Washington	L 69–76	Karima Christmas-Kelly (15)	Courtney Paris (19)	Odyssey Sims (3)	BOK Center; 6,147	10–8
19	July 30	Phoenix	L 66–78	Odyssey Sims (16)	Courtney Paris (7)	Odyssey Sims (4)	BOK Center; 4,637	10–9

August : 5–5 (Home: 4–2; Road: 1–3)

Game	Date	Team	Score	High points	High rebounds	High assists	Location Attendance	Record
20	August 1	Minnesota	L 80–86	Riquna Williams (35)	Paris, Pierson (8)	Odyssey Sims (6)	BOK Center; 4,776	10–10
21	August 4	@ Phoenix	L 84–87 (OT)	Christmas-Kelly, Williams (17)	Courtney Paris (16)	Plenette Pierson (4)	US Airways Center; 8,824	10–11
22	August 6	@ Los Angeles	L 57–84	Plenette Pierson (14)	Courtney Paris (6)	Riquna Williams (4)	Staples Center; 8,056	10–12
23	August 9	Atlanta	L 90–98	Riquna Williams (35)	Courtney Paris (11)	Christmas-Kelly, Sims (4)	BOK Center; 5,345	10–13
24	August 12	@ Connecticut	L 74–80	Christmas-Kelly, Sims (15)	Courtney Paris (9)	Odyssey Sims (6)	Mohegan Sun Arena; 4,682	10–14
25	August 15	@ New York	W 81–76	Odyssey Sims (27)	Courtney Paris (10)	Odyssey Sims (7)	Madison Square Garden; 9,857	11–14
26	August 18	Phoenix	W 74–59	Riquna Williams (18)	Courtney Paris (11)	Riquna Williams (6)	BOK Center; 4,566	12–14
27	August 21	Connecticut	W 84–76 (OT)	Riquna Williams (22)	Karima Christmas-Kelly (8)	Karima Christmas-Kelly (5)	BOK Center; 4,225	13–14
28	August 28	Los Angeles	W 76–66	Sims, Williams (15)	Courtney Paris (13)	Sims, Williams (4)	BOK Center; 4,776	14–14
29	August 30	Indiana	W 76–70	Odyssey Sims (30)	Courtney Paris (6)	Odyssey Sims (5)	BOK Center; 4,512	15–14

September : 3–2 (Home: 2–0; Road: 1–2)

Game	Date	Team	Score	High points	High rebounds	High assists	Location Attendance	Record
30	September 3	@ Seattle	W 85–67	Odyssey Sims (24)	Christmas-Kelly, Jackson, Paris (8)	Odyssey Sims (4)	KeyArena; 4,352	16–14
31	September 6	@ Los Angeles	L 73–92	Pierson, Sims (21)	Courtney Paris (6)	Odyssey Sims (6)	Staples Center; 10,114	16–15
32	September 8	San Antonio	W 74–64	Odyssey Sims (27)	Paris, Plaisance, Sims (7)	Kiesel, Sims (2)	BOK Center; 4,145	17–15
33	September 11	@ Chicago	L 71–92	Vicki Baugh (22)	Tiffany Jackson (9)	Brianna Kiesel (8)	Allstate Arena; 7,753	17–16
34	September	Phoenix	W 91–87	Brianna Kiesel (28)	Amanda Zahui B. (8)	Brianna Kiesel (5)	BOK Center; 6,064	18–16

2015 season schedule

=== Playoffs ===
2015 playoff game log
First Round vs. Phoenix Mercury
Lost Series: 0–2 (Home: 0–1; Road: 0–1)

Game	Date	Team	Score	High points	High rebounds	High assists	Location Attendance	Series
1	September 17	@ Phoenix	L 55–88	Odyssey Sims (18)	Courtney Paris (7)	Odyssey Sims (3)	US Airways Center; 8,509	0–1
2	September 19	Phoenix	L 67–91	Odyssey Sims (22)	Courtney Paris (8)	Odyssey Sims (7)	BOK Center; 3,261	0–2

2015 playoff schedule

== Standings ==
Western Conference	W	L	PCT	GB	Home	Road	Conf.
z - Minnesota Lynx	22	12	.647	–	13–4	9–8	16–6
x - Phoenix Mercury	20	14	.588	2	13–4	7–10	15–7
x - Tulsa Shock	18	16	.529	4	12–5	6–11	11–11
x - Los Angeles Sparks	14	20	.412	8	9–8	5–12	10–12
e - Seattle Storm	10	24	.294	12	8–9	2–15	8–14
e - San Antonio Stars	8	26	.235	14	7–10	1–16	6–16

== Playoffs ==
**Conference semifinals** Best-of-3
E1	**New York**	**2**
E4	Washington	1
**Eastern Conference**
E2	Chicago	1
E3	**Indiana**	**2**
W1	**Minnesota**	**2**
W4	Los Angeles	1
**Western Conference**
W2	**Phoenix**	**2**
W3	Tulsa	0

**Conference finals** Best-of-3
E1	New York	1
E3	**Indiana**	**2**
W1	**Minnesota**	**2**
W2	Phoenix	0

**WNBA Finals**; Best-of-5
E3	Indiana	2
W1	**Minnesota**	**3**

- **Bold** – Series winner
- Italics – Team with home-court advantage

== Statistics ==
Legend
GP	Games played	GS	Games started	MPG	Minutes per game	RPG	Rebounds per game
APG	Assists per game	SPG	Steals per game	BPG	Blocks per game	PPG	Points per game
FG%	Field-goal percentage	3P%	3-point field-goal percentage	FT%	Free-throw percentage	TO	Turnovers per game
PF	Fouls per game		Team leader		League leader

=== Regular season ===
Player	GP	GS	MPG	FG%	3P%	FT%	RPG	APG	SPG	BPG	PPG
Skylar Diggins	9	9	32.1	40.5%	44.8%	91.8%	2.7	5.0	1.6	0.3	17.8
Odyssey Sims	23	19	31.4	36.9%	20.7%	84.7%	3.4	3.8	1.1	0.0	16.0
Karima Christmas-Kelly	32	32	28.7	39.6%	38.6%	78.2%	5.0	1.7	1.1	0.3	10.6
Plenette Pierson	30	29	28.1	43.7%	36.2%	80.8%	4.1	1.9	1.0	0.4	12.8
Riquna Williams	29	20	28.0	35.2%	34.6%	85.0%	3.4	2.6	1.5	0.5	15.6
Courtney Paris	34	34	25.0	48.6%	—	42.5%	9.3	1.3	0.4	1.2	6.6
Brianna Kiesel	34	15	18.1	33.3%	23.1%	75.5%	0.8	1.9	0.8	0.1	5.1
Jordan Hooper	34	5	17.1	35.8%	34.2%	68.4%	2.1	0.3	0.4	0.1	4.7
Vicki Baugh	34	6	15.7	47.3%	0.0%	73.8%	4.1	0.6	0.5	0.4	5.4
Tiffany Jackson	12	0	14.6	50.0%	—	83.3%	4.3	0.7	0.5	0.4	4.1
Amanda Zahui B.	31	0	9.7	36.1%	33.3%	75.0%	2.4	0.3	0.2	0.6	3.4
Theresa Plaisance	25	1	8.2	28.1%	32.0%	70.0%	1.9	0.2	0.2	0.2	1.9
Brittany Hrynko	2	0	1.5	0.0%	0.0%	—	—	—	—	—	—

=== Playoffs ===
Player	GP	GS	MPG	FG%	3P%	FT%	RPG	APG	SPG	BPG	PPG
Odyssey Sims	2	2	33.5	33.3%	27.3%	78.6%	4.0	5.0	2.0	0.0	20.0
Karima Christmas-Kelly	2	2	32.5	21.1%	0.0%	87.5%	5.0	1.0	1.5	0.5	7.5
Plenette Pierson	2	2	27.0	35.7%	33.3%	—	5.5	0.5	1.0	0.5	10.5
Jordan Hooper	2	2	26.0	21.1%	18.8%	71.4%	4.5	—	—	—	8.0
Courtney Paris	2	2	21.0	45.5%	—	25.0%	7.5	1.0	1.0	—	5.5
Brianna Kiesel	2	0	16.5	21.4%	0.0%	100.0%	2.5	0.5	—	—	6.0
Vicki Baugh	2	0	16.0	28.6%	—	—	3.0	—	0.5	—	2.0
Riquna Williams	1	0	16.0	16.7%	0.0%	—	2.0	1.0	1.0	—	2.0
Tiffany Jackson	2	0	10.5	0.0%	—	50.0%	2.0	—	1.0	—	0.5
Amanda Zahui B.	2	0	6.0	0.0%	0.0%	—	1.5	—	—	0.5	—
Theresa Plaisance	2	0	3.5	0.0%	0.0%	—	—	0.5	—	—	—

== Awards and honors ==
Recipient	Award	Date awarded	Ref.
Skylar Diggins	Western Conference Player of the Week	June 23	
Skylar Diggins	Western Conference Player of the Month - June	July 6	
Odyssey Sims	Western Conference Player of the Week	August 31	
Courtney Paris	Peak Performer:Rebounds	September 17	
