= Hryhorenko =

Hryhorenko is a Ukrainian surname derived from the given name "Hryhor", or Gregory. The Russified form is Grigorenko. Notable people with the surname include:

- Hrytsko Hryhorenko (1867–1924), pen name of Oleksandra Sudovshchykova-Kosach, Ukrainian journalist and writer
- Kateryna Hryhorenko (born 1985), Ukrainian cross country skier
- Petro Hryhorenko (1907–1987), Soviet Army general of Ukrainian descent, who became a dissident and a writer

== See also ==
- Grigorenko
