= Hryniuk =

Hryniuk (Ukrainian: Гринюк) is a Ukrainian patronymic surname literally meaning "son of Hryn'", where Hryn' (Гринь) is a diminutive of Hryhorii, 'Gregory'. Russian equivalent: Grinyuk.

- John Hryniuk
- Mariia Hryniuk
- Volodymyr Hryniuk
