= Hrynko =

Hrynko or Hrynʼko (ukr. Гринько) is a Ukrainian surname. Its Russified form is Grinko. Notable people with the surname include:

Notable people with the surname include:

- Brittany Hrynko (born 1993), American basketball player
- Hryhoriy Hrynko (1890–1938), Soviet Ukrainian statesman
- Igor Grinko, Russian rowing coach
- Mykola Hrynko (1920–1989), Soviet Ukrainian actor
- Nikolai Grinko, Soviet/Ukrainian actor

== See also ==
- Hryn
