= Grigorenko =

Grigorenko (Russian: Григоренко) is a surname of Ukrainian origin. It means "son of Grigoriy (Gregory)" and may refer to the following notable people:

- Pyotr Grigorenko, a Soviet dissident.
- Igor Grigorenko, Russian ice hockey player
- Kamila Grigorenko, Estonian rhythmic gymnast
- Mikhail Grigorenko, Russian ice hockey player
- Julia Grigorenko, Ukrainian ice dancer
- Paulina Grigorenko, Russian 1992 Amsterdam Marathon female winner

== See also ==
- Hryhorenko
