= Grin (surname) =

Grin is the surname of the following people:

- Alexander Grin (1880–1932), Russian novelist
- Elda Grin, Armenian writer, psychologist and legal expert
- François Grin (born 1959), Swiss economist

== See also ==
- Hryn
