= Brittany Hrynko =

American basketball player (born 1993)

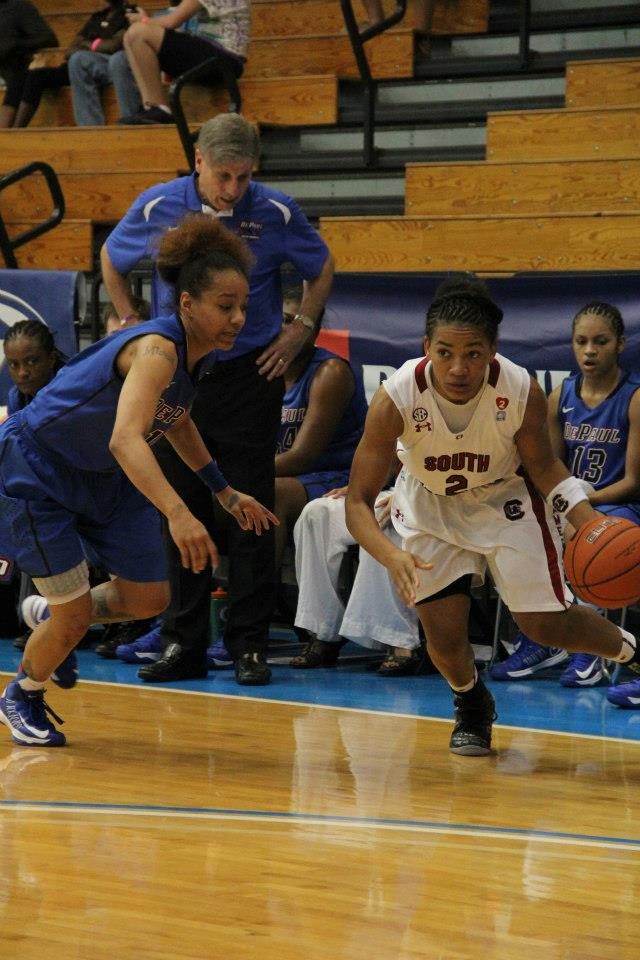
- Hrynko (blue) with DePaul

No. 15 – Harlem Globetrotters
- Position: Guard

Personal information
- Born: April 24, 1993 (age 33)
- Listed height: 5 ft 8 in (1.73 m)
- Listed weight: 150 lb (68 kg)

Career information
- High school: Carver (Philadelphia, Pennsylvania)
- College: DePaul (2011–2015)
- WNBA draft: 2015: 2nd round, 19th overall pick
- Drafted by: Connecticut Sun
- Playing career: 2015, 2018–present

Career history
- 2015: San Antonio Stars
- 2015: Tulsa Shock
- 2018–present: Harlem Globetrotters
- 2019–present: Philadelphia Reign

Career highlights
- Big East Player of the Year (2015); 3× First-team All-Big East (2013–2015); Big East Most Improved Player (2013); Big East All-Freshman Team (2012)
- Stats at Basketball Reference

Brittany "Ice" Hrynko (born April 24, 1993) is an American basketball player, currently signed with the Philadelphia Reign of the Women's Basketball Development Association since 2019 and has also played with the Harlem Globetrotters since 2018. She was drafted by the Connecticut Sun of the Women's National Basketball Association in the 2015 WNBA draft. She was then traded to the Atlanta Dream, but was released and later signed short-term contracts with the San Antonio Stars and Tulsa Shock. From 2015 to 2018 she signed with teams in Israel, Slovakia, Italy and Germany.

== College ==
In Hrynko's final season at DePaul she averaged 19.1 points per game. She is DePaul's ninth WNBA draft pick.

== Career statistics ==
Legend
GP	Games played	GS	Games started	MPG	Minutes per game	RPG	Rebounds per game
APG	Assists per game	SPG	Steals per game	BPG	Blocks per game	PPG	Points per game
TO	Turnovers per game	FG%	Field-goal percentage	3P%	3-point field-goal percentage	FT%	Free-throw percentage
**Bold**	Career best	°	League leader

=== WNBA ===
==== Regular season ====
WNBA regular season statistics
Year	Team	GP	GS	MPG	FG%	3P%	FT%	RPG	APG	SPG	BPG	TO	PPG
2015	San Antonio	**5**	0	**3.0**	**.167**	.000	—	0.0	**0.2**	0.0	0.0	0.2	**0.4**
2015	Tulsa	2	0	1.5	.000	.000	—	0.0	0.0	0.0	0.0	**0.0**	0.0
**Career**	1 year, 2 teams	7	0	2.6	.143	.000	—	0.0	0.1	0.0	0.0	0.1	0.3

=== College ===
NCAA statistics
Year	Team	GP	Points	FG%	3P%	FT%	RPG	APG	SPG	BPG	PPG
2011-12	DePaul	34	366	34.7	32.0	69.7	4.3	3.9	1.8	0.1	10.8
2012-13	DePaul	33	486	32.8	31.1	**70.1**	**4.5**	4.8	2.0	**0.3**	14.7
2013-14	DePaul	**36**	449	40.6	32.1	60.5	3.7	5.6	2.4	0.2	12.5
2014-15	DePaul	35	**669**	**43.3**	**34.2**	69.0	3.8	**5.3**	**2.6**	0.1	**19.1**
**Career**		138	1970	38.2	32.4	67.2	4.1	4.9	2.2	0.2	14.3

== Personal life ==
As of late May 2015, she has almost 30 tattoos.
