= Hrytsko =

Hrytsko, also Hryts'ko is a Ukrainian given name, a diminutive of Hryhoriy, Grigory. Notable people with the name include:

- Hrytsko Hryhorenko, Ukrainian journalist and writer
- Hryts'ko Kernerenko, Jewish-Ukrainian poet
