= 2015 WNBA draft =

Player selection process

General information
- Sport: Basketball
- Date: 16 April
- Location: Mohegan Sun Arena, Uncasville, Connecticut
- Networks: ESPN2, ESPNU

Overview
- League: WNBA
- First selection: Jewell Loyd; Seattle Storm

The 2015 WNBA draft was the league's draft for the 2015 WNBA season. The Seattle Storm picked first.

This year's draft was unusual in that two players with remaining college eligibility declared for the draft—Jewell Loyd of Notre Dame, who had one year of eligibility remaining, and Amanda Zahui B. of Minnesota, with two years remaining. Both players were draft-eligible by virtue of their births in 1993; under current draft rules, players who turn 22 in the calendar year of the draft can declare themselves eligible even if they have not completed college eligibility. Before this season, only two players with remaining college eligibility had ever entered the WNBA draft, and only one of these did so before her fourth college season (Kelsey Bone in 2012).

== Draft lottery ==
The lottery selection to determine the order of the top four picks in the 2015 draft occurred on August 21, 2014. The team that would get the first pick would be the winner of the lottery.

Note: Team selected for the No. 1 pick noted in bold text.

| Team | 2014 record | Lottery chances | Result |
|---|---|---|---|
| **Seattle Storm** | **12–22** | **35.9%** | **1st pick** |
| Tulsa Shock | 12–22 | 35.9% | 2nd pick |
| Connecticut Sun | 13–21 | 17.8% | 3rd pick |
| Connecticut Sun (from New York Liberty) | 15–19 (Note: New York's record) | 10.4% | 4th pick |

== Draft invitees ==
The WNBA announced on April 13, 2015 the 12 players invited to attend the draft.

- (United States) Brittany Boyd, California
- (United States) Reshanda Gray, California
- (United States) Dearica Hamby, Wake Forest
- (United States) Isabelle Harrison, Tennessee
- (United States) Brittany Hrynko, DePaul
- (United States) Samantha Logic, Iowa
- (United States) Jewell Loyd, Notre Dame
- (United States) Kaleena Mosqueda-Lewis, Connecticut
- (United States) Kiah Stokes, Connecticut
- (United States) Aleighsa Welch, South Carolina
- (United States) Elizabeth Williams, Duke
- (Sweden) Amanda Zahui B., Minnesota

== Key ==
| ! | Denotes player who has been inducted to the Naismith Basketball Hall of Fame |
| ^ | Denotes player who has been inducted to the Women's Basketball Hall of Fame |
| * | Denotes player who has been selected for at least one All-Star Game and All-WNBA Team |
| ^{+} | Denotes player who has been selected for at least one All-Star Game |
| ^{#} | Denotes player who never played in the WNBA regular season or playoffs |
| **Bold** | Denotes player who won Rookie of the Year |

== Draft ==
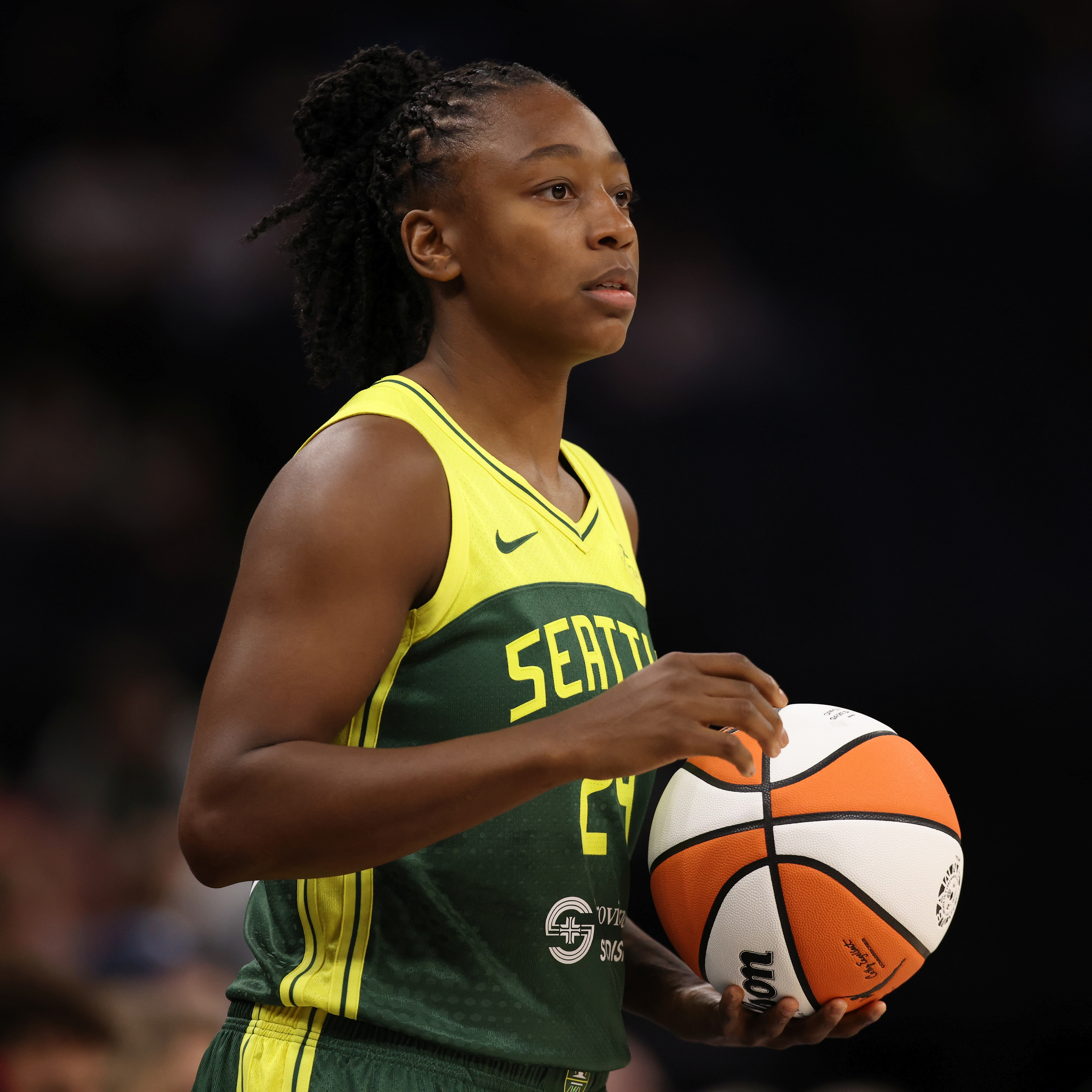
Jewell Loyd was selected 1st overall by the Seattle Storm.

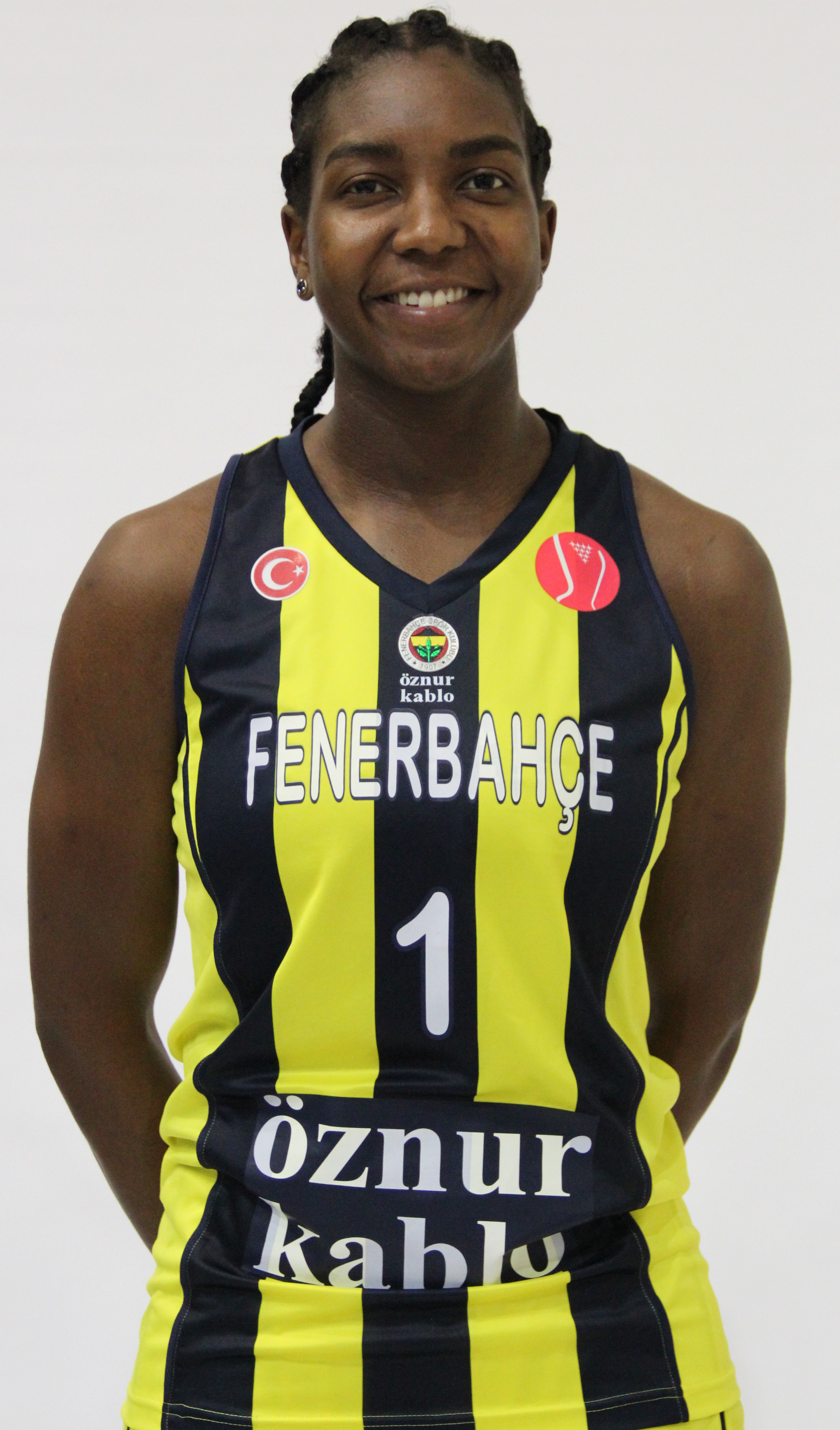
Elizabeth Williams was selected 4th overall by the Connecticut Sun.

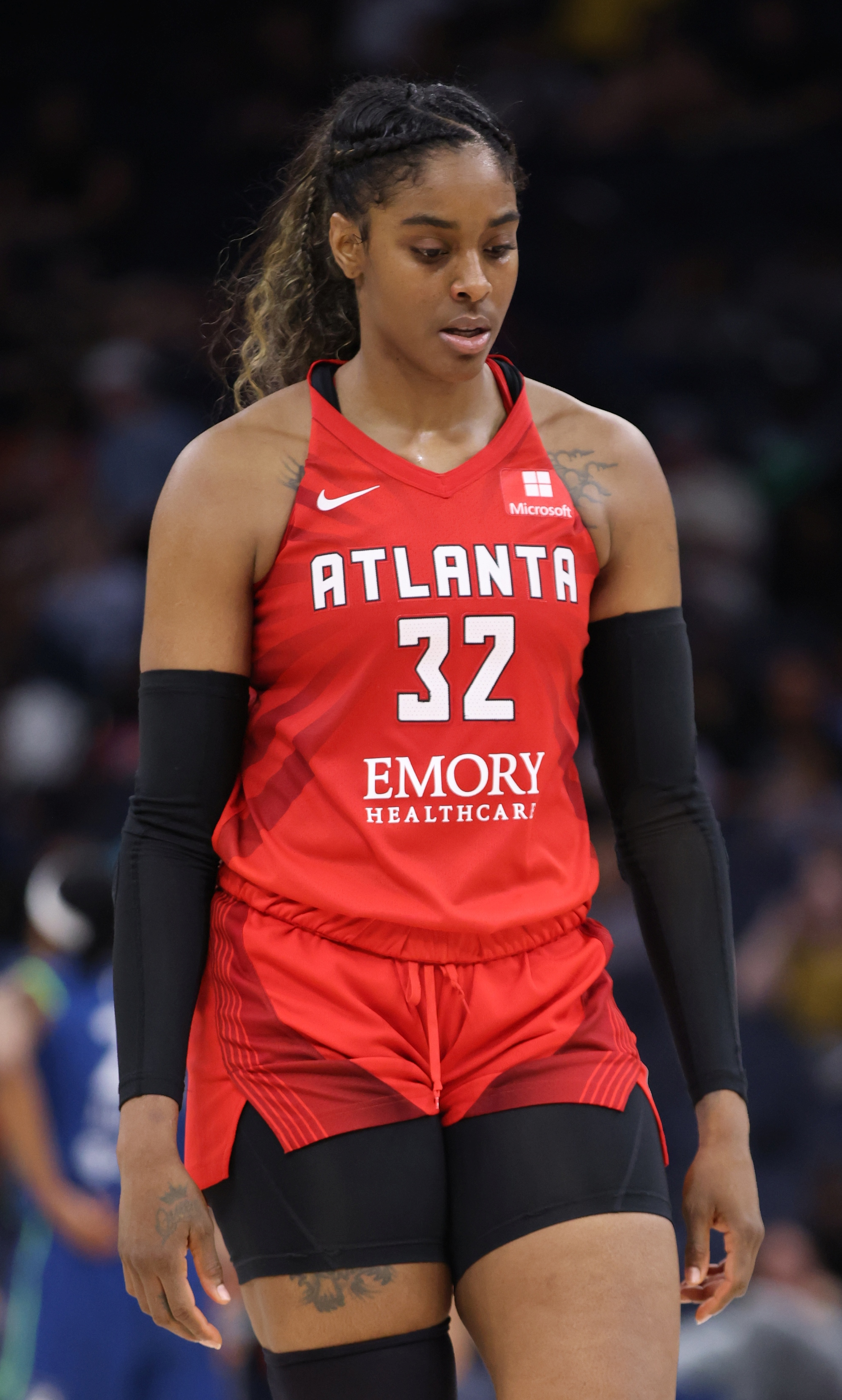
Cheyenne Parker-Tyus was selected 5th overall by the Chicago Sky.

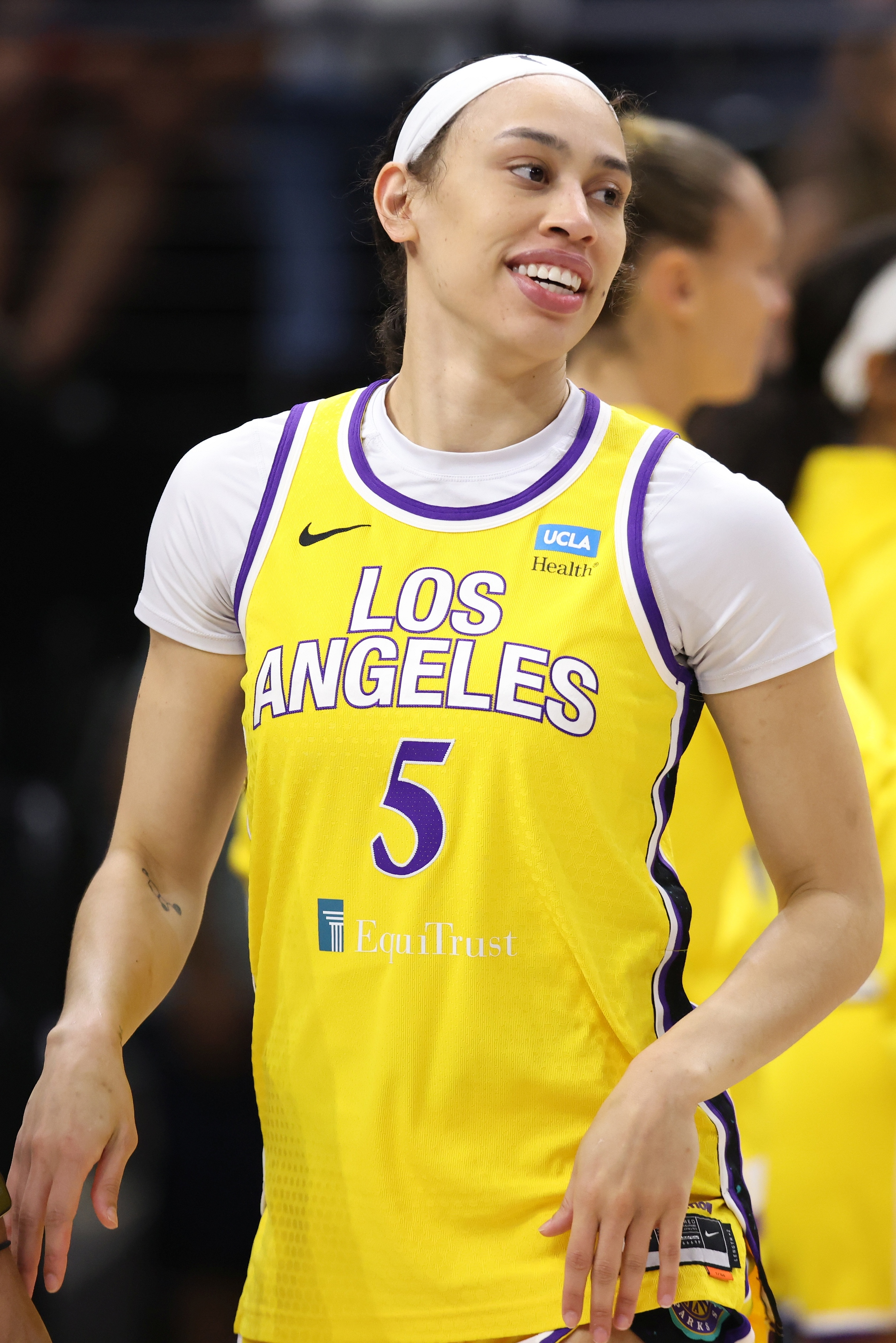
Dearica Hamby was selected 6th overall by the San Antonio Stars.

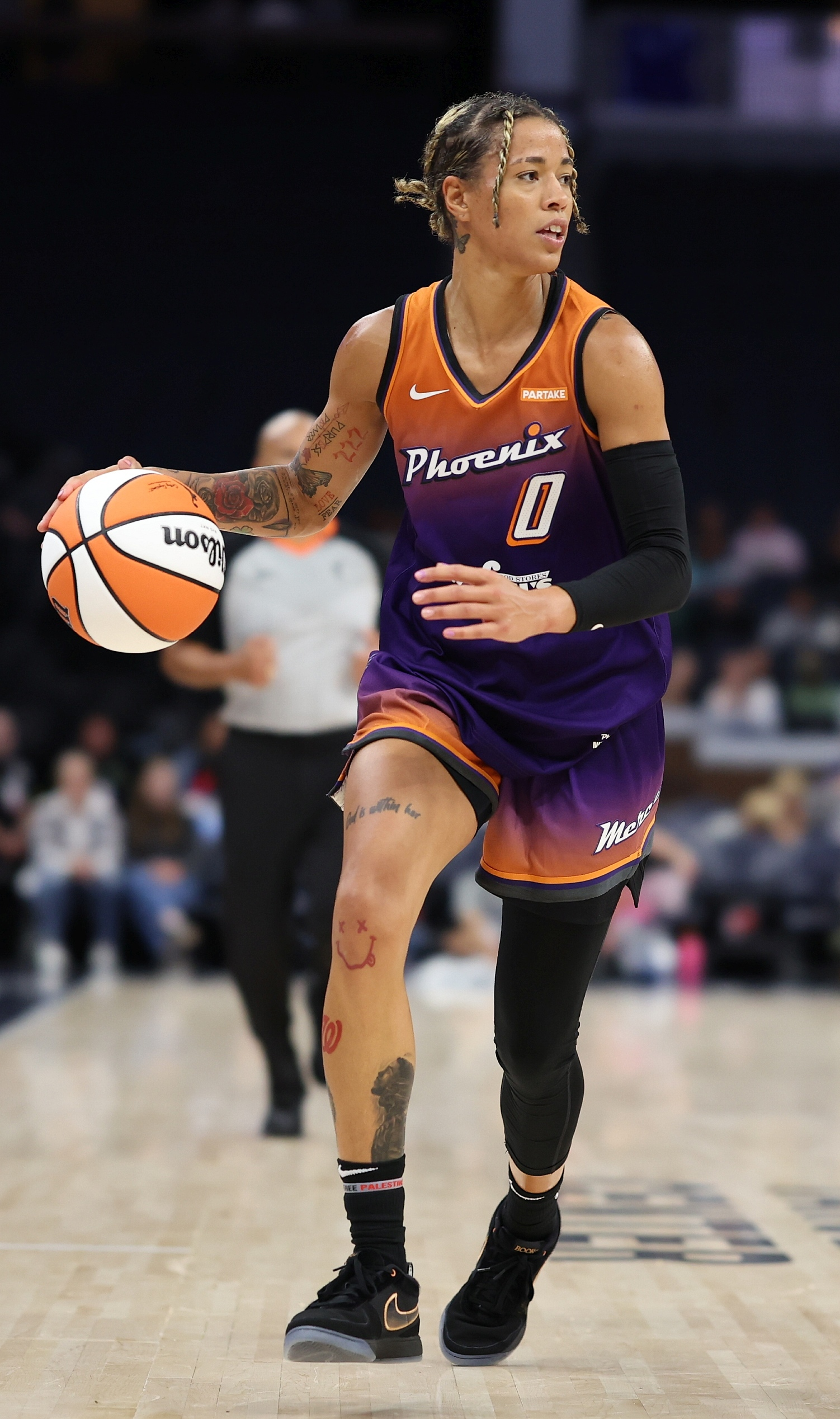
Natasha Cloud was selected 15th overall by the Washington Mystics.

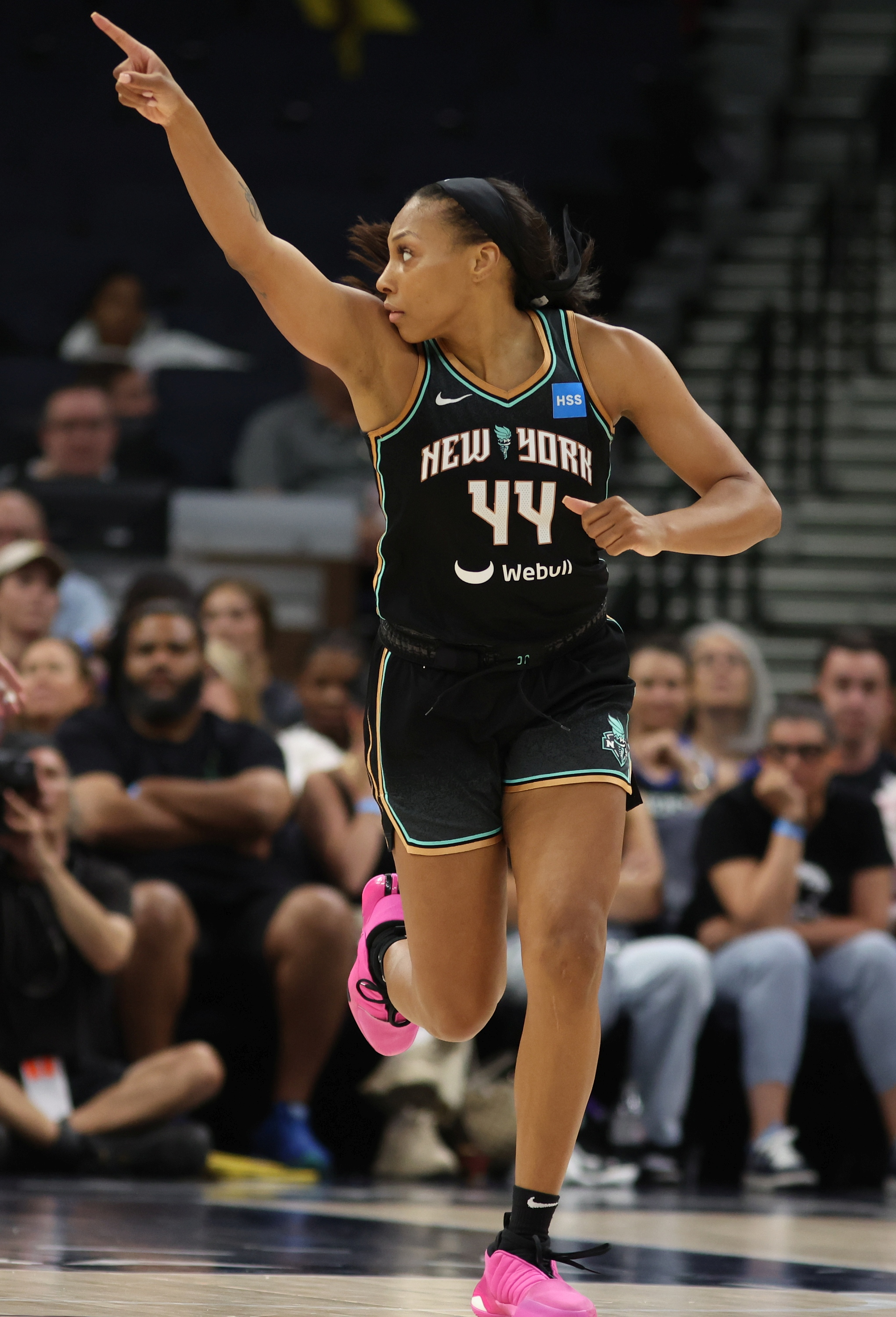
Betnijah Laney-Hamilton was selected 17th overall by the Chicago Sky.

=== Round 1 ===
| Pick | Player | Nationality | Team | School / club team |
|---|---|---|---|---|
| 1 | **Jewell Loyd** * | United States | Seattle Storm | Notre Dame |
| 2 | Amanda Zahui B. | Sweden | Tulsa Shock | Minnesota |
| 3 | Kaleena Mosqueda-Lewis | United States | Seattle Storm (from Connecticut) (Note: The Storm traded Camille Little and Shekinna Stricklen to Connecticut for the 3rd and 15th picks in this draft.) | Connecticut |
| 4 | Elizabeth Williams ^{+} | United States | Connecticut Sun (from New York) | Duke |
| 5 | Cheyenne Parker ^{+} | United States | Chicago Sky | Middle Tennessee |
| 6 | Dearica Hamby ^{+} | United States | San Antonio Stars (from Indiana) (Note: The Stars traded Shenise Johnson and their second-round pick to Indiana for the first- and third-round picks in this draft.) | Wake Forest |
| 7 | Crystal Bradford | United States | Los Angeles Sparks | Central Michigan |
| 8 | Ally Malott | United States | Washington Mystics | Dayton |
| 9 | Brittany Boyd | United States | New York Liberty (from San Antonio) | California |
| 10 | Samantha Logic | United States | Atlanta Dream | Iowa |
| 11 | Kiah Stokes | United States | New York Liberty (from Minnesota) | Connecticut |
| 12 | Isabelle Harrison | United States | Phoenix Mercury | Tennessee |

=== Round 2 ===
| Pick | Player | Nationality | Team | School / club team |
|---|---|---|---|---|
| 13 | Brianna Kiesel | United States | Tulsa Shock | Pittsburgh |
| 14 | Cierra Burdick | United States | Los Angeles Sparks (from Seattle) | Tennessee |
| 15 | Natasha Cloud | United States | Washington Mystics (from Connecticut via Seattle) | Saint Joseph's |
| 16 | Reshanda Gray | United States | Minnesota Lynx (from New York) | California |
| 17 | Betnijah Laney ^{+} | United States | Chicago Sky | Rutgers |
| 18 | Alex Harden | United States | Phoenix Mercury (from Indiana) (Note: May 12, 2014: Indiana to Phoenix: Indiana acquired Maggie Lucas; Phoenix acquired 2015 second-round pick) | Wichita State |
| 19 | Brittany Hrynko (traded to Atlanta) | United States | Connecticut Sun (from Los Angeles) | DePaul |
| 20 | Vicky McIntyre ^{#} | United States | Seattle Storm (from Washington) | Oral Roberts |
| 21 | Chelsea Gardner ^{#} | United States | Indiana Fever (from San Antonio) | Kansas |
| 22 | Aleighsa Welch ^{#} | United States | Chicago Sky (from Atlanta) | South Carolina |
| 23 | Amber Orrange ^{#} | United States | New York Liberty (from Minnesota) | Stanford |
| 24 | Žofia Hruščáková ^{#} | Slovakia | Phoenix Mercury | Good Angels Košice (Slovakia) |

=== Round 3 ===
| Pick | Player | Nationality | Team | School / club team |
|---|---|---|---|---|
| 25 | Mimi Mungedi ^{#} | Gabon | Tulsa Shock | Nevada |
| 26 | Nneka Enemkpali ^{#} | United States | Seattle Storm | Texas |
| 27 | Laurin Mincy ^{#} | United States | New York Liberty (from Connecticut) | Maryland |
| 28 | Michala Johnson ^{#} | United States | New York Liberty (from Minnesota) | Wisconsin |
| 29 | Ariel Massengale ^{#} | United States | Atlanta Dream | Tennessee |
| 30 | Dragana Stanković ^{#} | Serbia | San Antonio Stars (from Indiana) | UNIQA Euroleasing Sopron (Hungary) |
| 31 | Andrea Hoover | United States | Los Angeles Sparks | Dayton |
| 32 | Marica Gajić ^{#} | Bosnia and Herzegovina | Washington Mystics | ŽKK Celje (Slovenia) |
| 33 | Nikki Moody ^{#} | United States | San Antonio Stars | Iowa State |
| 34 | Lauren Okafor ^{#} | United States | Atlanta Dream | James Madison |
| 35 | Shae Kelley | United States | Minnesota Lynx (from New York) | Minnesota |
| 36 | Promise Amukamara ^{#} | Nigeria | Phoenix Mercury | Arizona State |
