= Odyssey Sims =

American basketball player (born 1992)

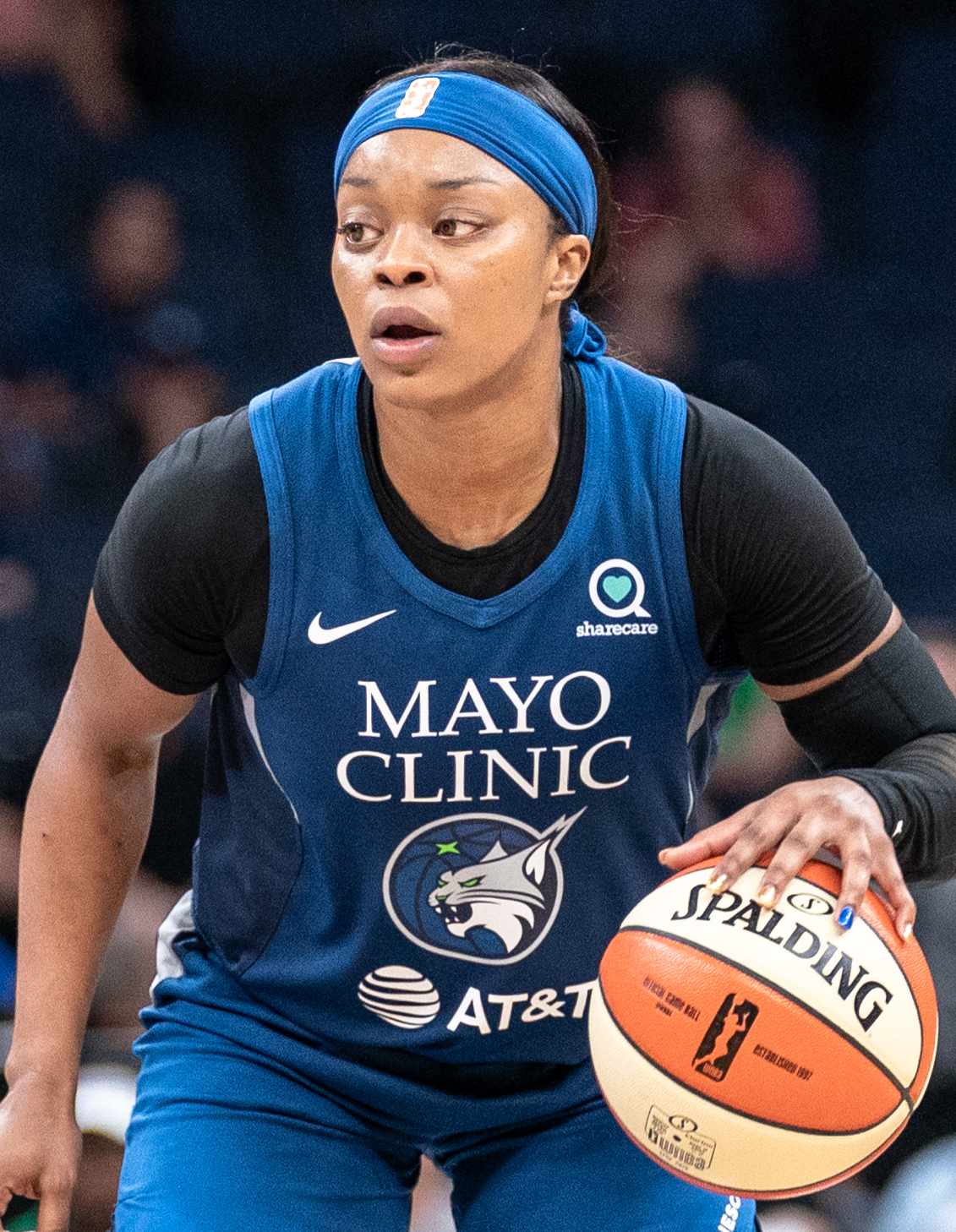
- Sims with the Minnesota Lynx in 2019

No. 1 – Dallas Wings
- Position: Point guard / shooting guard
- League: WNBA

Personal information
- Born: July 13, 1992 (age 34) Irving, Texas, U.S.
- Listed height: 5 ft 8 in (1.73 m)
- Listed weight: 155 lb (70 kg)

Career information
- High school: MacArthur (Irving, Texas)
- College: Baylor (2010–2014)
- WNBA draft: 2014: 1st round, 2nd overall pick
- Drafted by: Tulsa Shock
- Playing career: 2014–present

Career history
- 2014–2016: Tulsa Shock / Dallas Wings
- 2014–2015: Bucheon KEB-Hana Bank
- 2015–2016: AGÜ Spor
- 2016–2017: Botaş SK
- 2017–2018: Los Angeles Sparks
- 2017–2018: Adana ASKİ SK
- 2018–2019: Kayseri Basketbol
- 2019–2020: Minnesota Lynx
- 2021: Atlanta Dream
- 2022: Minnesota Lynx
- 2022: Connecticut Sun
- 2023–2024: Dallas Wings
- 2024–2025: Los Angeles Sparks
- 2024: Henan Phoenix
- 2025: Indiana Fever
- 2026–present: Dallas Wings

Career highlights
- WNBA All-Star (2019); All-WNBA Second Team (2019); WNBA All-Rookie Team (2014); NCAA champion (2012); Nancy Lieberman Award (2014); Frances Pomeroy Naismith Award (2014); Dawn Staley Award (2014); Wade Trophy (2014); 2× First-team All-American – AP (2013, 2014); 3× WBCA Coaches' All-American (2012–2014); 3× All-American – USBWA (2012–2014); Second-team All-American – AP (2012); Big 12 Player of the Year (2014); Big 12 Defensive Player of the Year (2014); 4× First-team All-Big 12 (2011–2014); 3× Big 12 All-Defensive Team (2012–2014); USBWA National Freshman of the Year (2011); Big 12 Freshman of the Year (2011); Big 12 All-Freshman Team (2011); McDonald's All-American (2010)
- Stats at WNBA.com
- Stats at Basketball Reference
Medals
Women's basketball
Representing United States
FIBA World Championship
Gold medal – first place	2014 Turkey	National team
World University Games
Gold medal – first place	2013 Kazan	Team
Gold medal – first place	2011 Shenzhen	Team

Odyssey Celeste Sims (born July 13, 1992) is an American professional basketball player for the Dallas Wings of the Women's National Basketball Association (WNBA) and Athletes Unlimited Pro Basketball. An AP and WBCA All-American, Sims was born in Irving, Texas and graduated from MacArthur High School.

== Early life ==
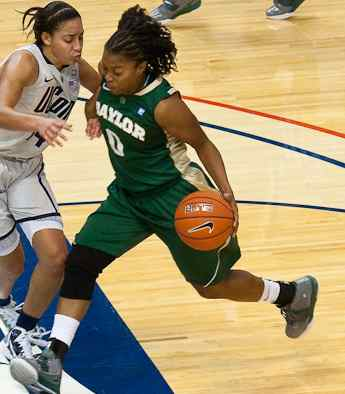
Sims in 2010

Sims was a 2010 graduate of MacArthur High School in Irving, Texas. She was rated the number one point guard in the class of 2010, earned the WBCA/State Farm National High School Player of the Year award and had her jersey retired.

== College career ==
Sims attended Baylor University for four seasons. As a freshman, Sims was Named National Freshman of the Year, was named Big 12 Freshman of the Year and also to the All-Big 12 first team. In her sophomore season, Sims earned team Co-MVP honors with teammate Brittney Griner, scored in double-digits in 30 of 40 games and won an NCAA Championship after Baylor defeated Notre Dame 80–69 to win their second title in school history after a perfect 40–0 record during the season, making it the first time ever in college basketball history that a team has achieved such a record. In her junior year, Sims was earned Co-MVP honors for the second straight year with Griner. In Big 12 statistics, she was ranked number 1 in assist/turnover ratio (2.7), number 3 in steals (2.8), number 4 in assists (5.8), and number 5 in free throw percentage (.832). In her senior year, Sims would statistically have the best season of her college career. She scored a career-high 48 points along with 10 rebounds in a 78–62 victory against West Virginia. She finished the season averaging 28.5 points per game.

Sims was inducted in the Baylor Athletics Hall of Fame on November 1, 2024.

== Professional career ==
=== WNBA ===
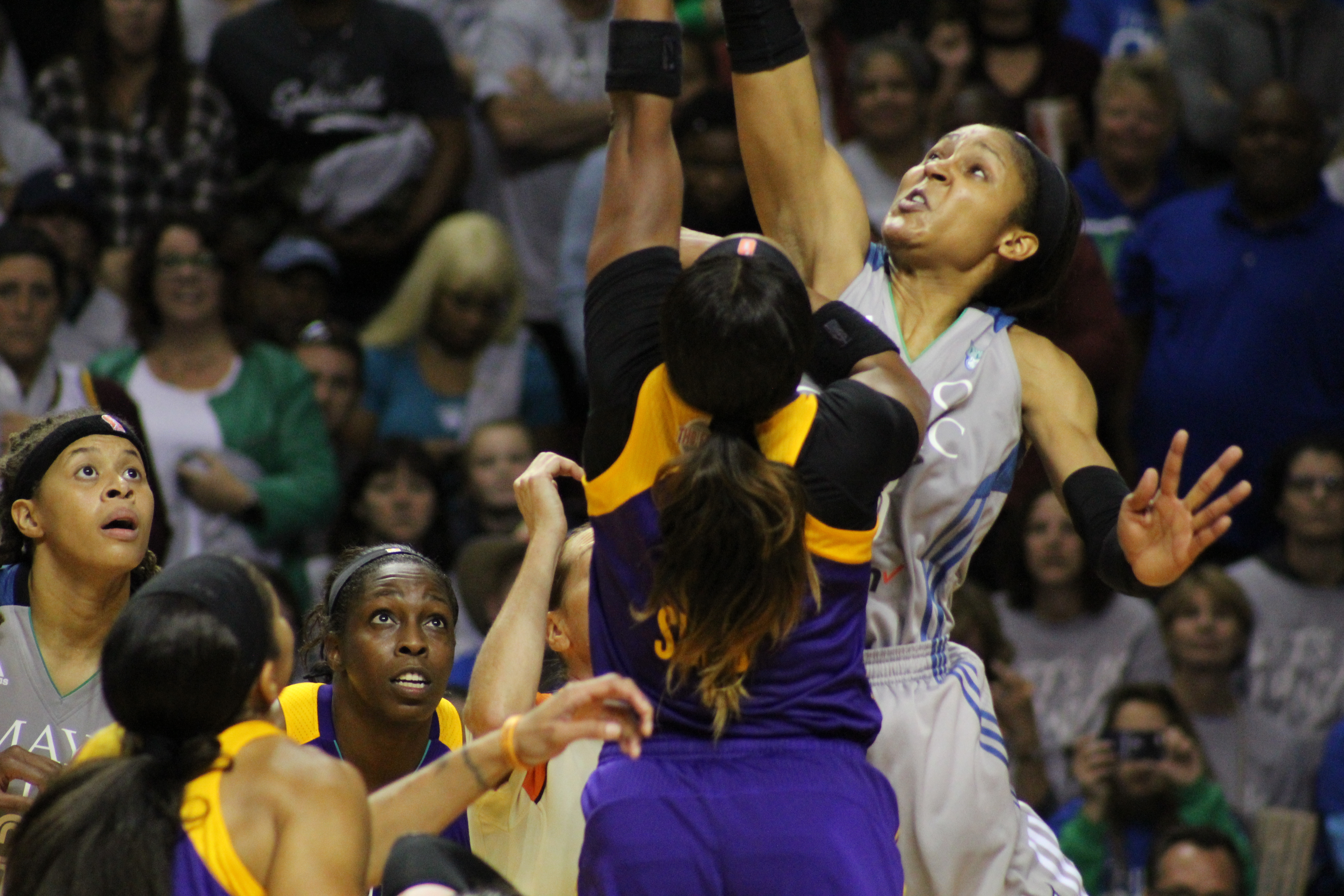
Sims and Maya Moore jump for the ball during game 5 of the 2017 WNBA Finals

Sims was drafted second overall by the Tulsa Shock in the 2014 WNBA draft. In her rookie season, Sims immediately entered the starting line-up for the Shock at the shooting guard position. Sims would instantly become a scoring sensation in the league; she scored a career-high 39 points in a 95–93 loss to the San Antonio Stars. She finished her rookie season, averaging a career-high 16.7 points per game along with a career-high 4.2 assists per game in 34 games with 31 starts and was named to the WNBA All-Rookie Team. The Shock finished in fifth place in the Western Conference with a 12–22 record, missing out on the playoffs.

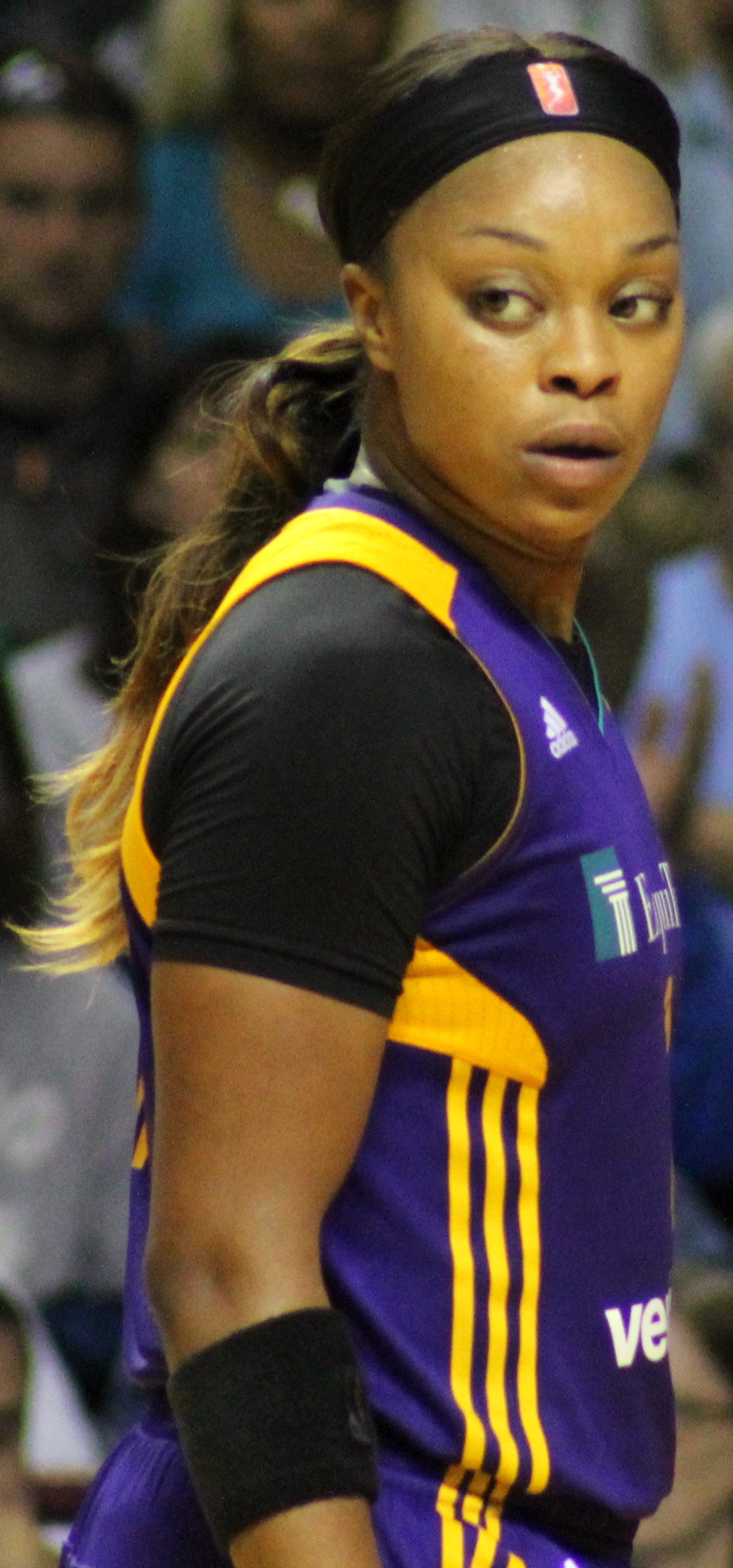
Sims during the 2017 WNBA Finals

In 2015, Sims would have an injury-riddled season, as she missed 10 games with a knee injury. She finished the season with 23 games played along with 19 starts and averaged 16.0 points per game and 3.8 assists per game. The Shock would make the playoffs with the number 3 seed in the Western Conference, posting an 18–16 record, but were eliminated in a two-game sweep by the Phoenix Mercury in the first round.

In 2016, the Tulsa Shock relocated to Dallas, Texas (which is approximately 15 miles away from Sims's hometown of Irving) and were renamed the Dallas Wings. In the 2016 season, Sims would be healthy; she played in 34 games with 30 starts and averaged 14.0 points per game along with 3.9 assists per game at shooting guard. The Wings missed out on playoff contention with an 11–23 record.

In 2017, Sims was traded to the Los Angeles Sparks, along with the number 11 overall pick in the 2017 WNBA draft, in exchange for two first-round picks in the 2017 WNBA Draft. She initially came off the bench, but would be inserted into the starting lineup at the shooting guard spot after Essence Carson suffered a right elbow sprain. On August 24, 2017, Sims scored a season-high 28 points along with eight assists and six rebounds as a starter in an 82–67 victory over the Phoenix Mercury. The Sparks would finish with a 26–8 record as the number 2 seed in the league with a double-bye to the semi-finals, following last season's new playoff format. Heading into the playoffs, Sims remained the starting shooting guard for the Sparks. The Sparks would go on to advance to the Finals after defeating the Mercury in a three-game sweep of the semi-finals, making it Sims's first Finals appearance. Sims tied her playoff career-high of 22 points in Game 3, with the Sparks winning 89–87 to clinch their second consecutive berth to the Finals. However, the Sparks would lose in the Finals to the Minnesota Lynx in five games.

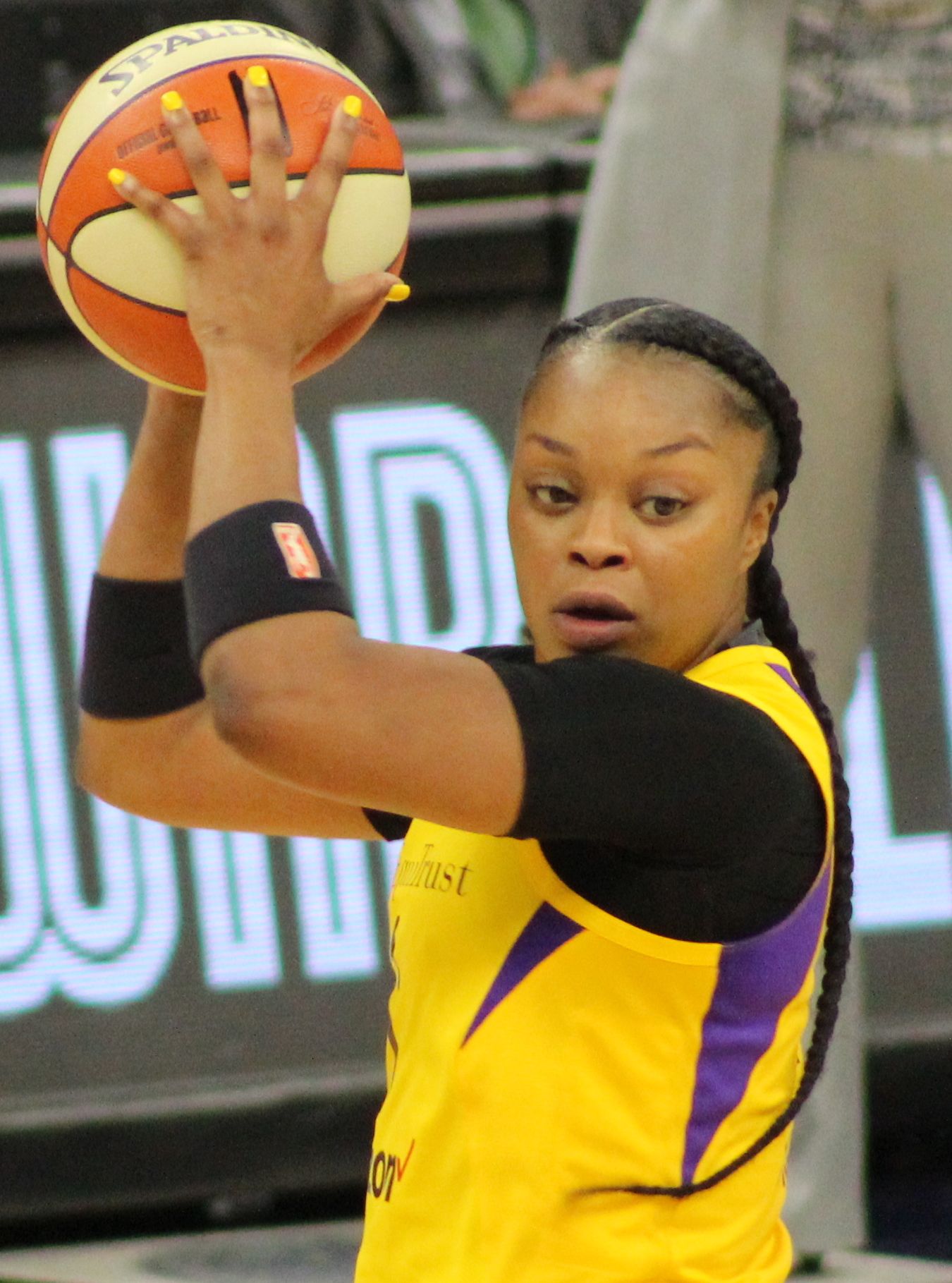
Sims in 2018

In February 2018, Sims re-signed with the Sparks in free agency. On May 20, 2018, in the Sparks' season opener, Sims scored a season-high 21 points in a 77–76 victory over the Minnesota Lynx. As the season went on, Sims would struggle and eventually would lose her starting position going into the playoffs. The Sparks finished as the number 6 seed in the league with a 19–15 record. In the first round elimination game, the Sparks defeated the Minnesota Lynx 75–68 to advance. In the second round elimination game, the Sparks would lose 96–64 to the Washington Mystics.

In 2019, Sims again re-signed with the Sparks after they matched an offer sheet made by the Phoenix Mercury. On April 22, 2019, Sims was traded to the Minnesota Lynx in exchange for Alexis Jones. Sims would be the starting point guard for the Lynx, her role enabled her to average a new career-high in assists. She would also end up being named an All-Star for the first time in her career after being voted into the 2019 WNBA All-Star Game and would make the All-WNBA Second Team. The Lynx finished the season 18–16 with the number 7 seed, but were eliminated by the Seattle Storm in the first round elimination game.

In 2020, the season was delayed and shortened to 22 games in a bubble at IMG Academy due to the COVID-19 pandemic. Sims was suspended for the first two regular season games without pay stemming from a DUI charge in October 2019 to which she pleaded guilty. She would end up missing more time after giving birth to her first child in April and eventually made her return in August. For the remainder of the team schedule, she started in 7 of the 13 games played, working her way back into the starting the lineup. The Lynx finished 14–8 with the number 4 seed, receiving a bye to the second round. In the second round elimination game, the Lynx edged out the Phoenix Mercury 80–79, advancing the franchise back to the semi-finals. However, in the semi-finals, they would get swept by the Seattle Storm who would end up being the eventual champions.

Sims signed a one-year contract with the Atlanta Dream for the 2021 season on March 1, 2021. She appeared in 30 games for the Dream, averaging 25.1 minutes and 8.7 points per game. The team went 8-24, missing the playoffs.

On May 3, 2022, Sims re-signed with the Minnesota Lynx on an undisclosed contract. On 13 May 2022, after the Lynx began the season 0–3, Sims left the team via "mutual separation" as one of six roster moves made by the team.

On August 3, 2022, Sims signed a seven-day contract with the Connecticut Sun.

On June 6, 2023, Sims signed back with the Dallas Wings on a hardship contract. Sims appeared in four games with the Wings before Crystal Dangerfield was cleared to return for Dallas - forcing them to release Sims from her hardship contract. On June 28, 2023, Sims returned to Dallas on a standard (rest-of-season) contract for the Wings.

Sims was not part of the Wings' training camp roster announced in April 2024. She played with Athletes Unlimited, serving as a team captain throughout their 2024 season, which was held in Dallas. Sims was signed to a hardship contract with the Wings on June 25, 2024. On August 17, 2024, Sims was signed to a hardship seven-day contract with the Los Angeles Sparks.

On February 2, 2025, Sims re-signed with the Sparks. On July 2, she was waived by the Sparks. She averaged 9.8 points, 2.9 rebounds, and 3.5 assists in 12 games.

On August 10, 2025 Sims signed with the Indiana Fever on a hardship contract due to the Fever's roster having several players out due to injury.

=== Overseas ===
In the 2014–15 WNBA off-season, Sims played for Bucheon KEB-Hana Bank in South Korea. In the 2015–16 WNBA off-season, Sims played for Abdullah Gül Üniversitesi B.K. in Turkey. As of August 2016, Sims signed with Botaş SK of the Turkish League for the 2016–17 WNBA off-season. In 2017, Sims signed with Adana ASKİ SK of the Turkish League for the 2017–18 WNBA off-season. In 2018, Sims signed with Kayseri Basketbol of the Turkish League during the 2018–19 WNBA off-season.

=== Athletes Unlimited ===
Sims has been a central figure in Athletes Unlimited Pro Basketball since the league's inaugural season. She is the league's all-time leader in career leaderboard points, win points, stat points, and MVP points, and the only player to surpass 20,000 leaderboard points and 10,000 win points. Sims has recorded three consecutive medal finishes, including runner-up placements in 2024 and 2025, and was named to the AU All-Defensive Team in 2025, while also holding multiple league records for games played, captaincies, and Game MVP awards. In October 2025, Sims signed to return to Athletes Unlimited Pro Basketball for its fifth season in Nashville, continuing her long-term involvement with the league. In March 2026, Sims became champion of the sixth season of AU Pro Basketball.

== National team career ==
Sims played on the team representing the US at the 2011 Summer Universiade held in Shenzhen, China. The team, coached by Bill Fennelly, won all six games to earn the gold medal. Sims averaged 6.2 points per game.

Sims was selected to be a member of the team representing the US at the 2013 Summer Universiade held in Kazan, Russia. The team, coached by Sherri Coale, won the opening four games easily, scoring in triple digits in each game, and winning by 30 or more points in each case. After winning the quarterfinal game against Sweden, they faced Australia in the semifinal. The USA team opened up as much as a 17 point in the fourth quarter of the game but the Australian team fought back and took a one-point lead in the final minute. Crystal Bradford scored a basket with 134 seconds left in the game to secure a 79–78 victory. The gold medal opponent was Russia, but the USA team never trailed, and won 90–71 to win the gold medal and the World University games Championship. Sims was the third leading scorer for the team, averaging 12.7 points per game. She led the team in assists with 32, and steals with 12. She was named co-MVP of the tournament, along with Russia's Tatiana Grigoryeva.

== Career statistics ==
Legend
GP	Games played	GS	Games started	MPG	Minutes per game	RPG	Rebounds per game
APG	Assists per game	SPG	Steals per game	BPG	Blocks per game	PPG	Points per game
TO	Turnovers per game	FG%	Field-goal percentage	3P%	3-point field-goal percentage	FT%	Free-throw percentage
**Bold**	Career best	°	League leader

*	Denotes season(s) in which Sims won an NCAA Championship

=== WNBA ===
==== Regular season ====
Stats current through end of 2025 season

WNBA regular season statistics
Year	Team	GP	GS	MPG	FG%	3P%	FT%	RPG	APG	SPG	BPG	TO	PPG
2014	Tulsa	**34**	31	**34.4**	.406	.346	.839	2.8	4.2	1.3	0.3	2.1	16.7
2015	Tulsa	23	19	31.4	.369	.207	.847	3.4	3.8	1.1	0.0	2.8	16.0
2016	Dallas	**34**	30	31.6	.353	.280	.883	2.5	3.9	1.1	0.2	2.5	14.0
2017	Los Angeles	31	14	24.3	.447	.190	.886	1.9	3.5	1.5	0.2	1.4	9.6
2018	Los Angeles	**34**	24	25.5	.388	.273	.722	2.5	2.8	0.6	0.0	1.5	8.2
2019	Minnesota	**34**	**34**	31.9	.415	.269	.795	3.4	5.4	1.4	0.1	3.3	14.5
2020	Minnesota	13	7	18.5	.403	.333	.909	2.0	3.5	0.5	0.1	1.9	9.4
2021	Atlanta	30	21	25.1	.370	.232	.729	2.5	3.6	1.2	0.1	1.6	8.7
2022	Minnesota	2	0	27.0	.304	.250	.444	**3.5**	3.5	0.5	**1.0**	2.5	9.5
2022	Connecticut	5	0	18.2	.333	.273	**1.000**	1.2	2.6	1.4	0.0	1.4	5.8
2023	Dallas	28	0	12.0	.304	.133	.550	1.3	2.2	0.4	0.0	**0.6**	2.0
2024	Dallas	9	7	33.9	**.535**	**.500**	.654	2.9	**5.6**	**1.7**	0.4	1.8	**17.2**
2024	Los Angeles	15	10	26.3	.438	.154	.838	1.7	5.1	0.9	0.1	2.4	9.8
2025	Los Angeles	12	11	29.5	.417	.353	.765	2.9	3.5	0.8	0.1	1.4	9.8
2025	Indiana	12	10	26.4	.412	.300	.810	1.8	4.0	0.6	0.0	1.3	10.3
**Career**	12 years, 6 teams	316	218	26.9	.398	.278	.814	2.5	3.8	1.0	0.1	1.9	11.1
**Career**	All-Star	1	0	15.9	.571	.667	—	2.0	2.0	1.0	0.0	1.0	10.0

==== Playoffs ====
WNBA playoff statistics
Year	Team	GP	GS	MPG	FG%	3P%	FT%	RPG	APG	SPG	BPG	TO	PPG
2015	Tulsa	2	2	33.6	.336	.333	.786	**4.0**	**5.0**	**2.0**	0.0	2.0	**20.0**
2017	Los Angeles	8	**8**	**34.8**	**.442**	.346	.929	2.4	3.6	1.3	0.0	3.1	15.9
2018	Los Angeles	2	0	14.4	.375	**.500**	**1.000**	2.5	1.5	1.0	0.0	**0.0**	4.5
2019	Minnesota	1	1	19.0	.000	.000	.500	1.0	**5.0**	0.0	0.0	1.0	1.0
2020	Minnesota	4	4	32.8	.412	.231	**1.000**	3.3	4.3	1.8	0.0	2.8	15.3
2022	Connecticut	**12**	0	13.8	.436	.286	.875	1.5	1.3	0.4	0.0	0.8	3.6
2023	Dallas	5	2	18.6	.411	.333	.600	1.0	2.4	0.8	0.0	1.0	6.4
2025	Indiana	8	**8**	29.4	.414	.333	.857	2.3	4.4	1.4	0.0	2.6	14.1
**Career**	8 years, 5 teams	42	25	24.2	.412	.313	.872	2.1	3.0	1.0	0.0	1.8	10.1

=== College ===
NCAA statistics
Year	Team	GP	GS	MPG	FG%	3P%	FT%	RPG	APG	SPG	BPG	TO	PPG
2010–11	Baylor	36	27	29.8	.475	**.453**	.757	3.0	3.1	1.4	0.0	2.4	13.1
2011–12*	Baylor	**40**	**37**	32.2	.447	.399	.830	3.0	4.4	**3.0**	**0.1**	2.6	14.9
2012–13	Baylor	32	31	30.8	**.477**	.337	**83.2**	2.5	**5.8**	2.8	**0.1**	**2.2**	12.9
2013–14	Baylor	37	**37**	**33.1**	.446	.398	.808	**4.6**	4.6	2.0	**0.1**	2.9	**28.5**
**Career**		145	132	31.5	.457	.403	.810	3.3	4.4	2.3	0.1	2.5	17.5

== Awards and honors ==
- WNBA All-Star (2019)
- All-WNBA Second Team (2019)
- WNBA All-Rookie Team (2014)
- WNBA turnovers leader (2019)
- 2010—WBCA High School Coaches' All-America Team
- 2014—ESPNW First Team All-American
- 2014—USBWA All-American team
- 2014—Nancy Lieberman Award
- 2014—Frances Pomeroy Naismith Award
- 2014—Wade Trophy
- 2014—Dawn Staley Award
- 2024—Baylor Athletics Hall of Fame
