= John Hryniuk =

Canadian photographer

John Hryniuk (September 5, 1968 – November 9, 2021) was a Canadian photographer based in Toronto, Ontario, Canada.

== Biography ==
John Hryniuk (pronounced “her-nick”) began his career in photojournalism working at Reuters and the Canadian Press in Ottawa Canada starting at the age of 16. He has also worked for The Globe and Mail, and The Toronto Star.

He has received the following awards for his work: Communication Arts, Coupe and the London Photographic Association.

His work has appeared in Forbes, People, Time, Wired, The New York Times Magazine, Life, Stern, Der Spiegel, and Newsweek.

Hryniuk has taken portraits of Charlize Theron, Sting, Michael Caine, Scott Speedman, Mariah Carey, former prime minister of Canada Brian Mulroney, Jean Chretien, Albert II, Prince of Monaco.
