= Volodymyr Hryniuk =

Volodymyr Hryniuk (October 14, 1986, Kivertsi, Ukraine) is a prominent Ukrainian activist, soldier, lieutenant colonel of the Armed Forces of Ukraine, commander of the motorized infantry battalion of the 30th separate mechanized brigade. Hero of Ukraine (2015), a participant in the Russian-Ukrainian war.

== Biography ==
Hryniuk graduated from Lutsk Pedagogical College (2006). Since then, he served in the ranks of the Armed Forces of Ukraine and studied at the Academy of Land Forces named after Hetman P. Sagaidachny in Lviv. After obtaining a higher military education, he served in the 30th Separate Mechanized Brigade of the 8th Army Corps of the Ground Forces of the Armed Forces of Ukraine, stationed in Novohrad-Volynskyi, Zhytomyr Region.

== Russia-Ukraine war ==
As of the beginning of 2015, he is the captain, commander of the mechanized company of the mechanized battalion of the 30th separate mechanized brigade.

On February 10–11, 2015, during the clearing of the settlement of Logvynove, thanks to the officer's courage and lightning-fast decisive actions, the assault group captured part of the settlement, while Volodymyr Hryniuk personally destroyed 3 units of armored vehicles and up to 30 militants. He was wounded during the operation, but continued to lead the combined unit. The unit subordinated to V. Hrynyuk destroyed a large number of armored vehicles and manpower of illegal armed formations.

As of October 2017, he is the deputy commander of the mechanized battalion of the 30th separate mechanized brigade.

As of July 2022, he is the commander of the motorized infantry battalion of the 30th separate mechanized brigade.

In 2022, he received the Order of Bohdan Khmelnytskyi, 3rd degree (2022).
