= 2015 Washington Mystics season =

- Coach: Mike Thibault
- Arena: Verizon Center
- Attendance: per game

Results
- Record: 18–16 (.529)
- Place: 4th (Eastern)

The 2015 WNBA season for the Washington Mystics of the Women's National Basketball Association was scheduled to begin June 5, 2015.

== Transactions ==
=== WNBA draft ===
In the first round of the 2015 WNBA Draft, the Washington Mystics selected Ally Malott from University of Dayton as the eighth pick. The Mystics selected Natasha Cloud from Saint Joseph's University in the second round with the fifteenth overall pick, and Maria Gajic from Bosnia in the third round with the thirty-second overall pick.

=== Trades ===
Date	Trade

== Roster ==
Player	GP	GS	MPG	FG%	3P%	FT%	RPG	APG	SPG	BPG	PPG

== Season standings ==
Eastern Conference	W	L	PCT	GB	Home	Road	Conf.
x - New York Liberty	23	11	.676	–	12–5	11–6	13–9
x - Chicago Sky	21	13	.618	2	13–4	8–9	14–8
x - Indiana Fever	20	14	.588	3	11–6	9–8	13–9
x - Washington Mystics	18	16	.529	5	11–6	7–10	10–12
e - Atlanta Dream	15	19	.441	8	9–8	6–11	10–12
e - Connecticut Sun	15	19	.441	8	8–9	7–10	6–16

== Schedule ==
=== Playoffs ===
They lost to the New York Liberty twice in the playoffs.
