= Hrytsko Hryhorenko =

Ukrainian journalist and writer

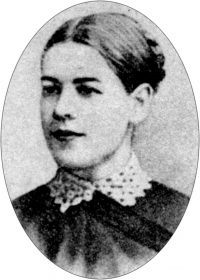
Hrytsko Hryhorenko

Hrytsko Hryhorenko (Ukrainian: Грицько Григоренко) was the pen name for Oleksandra Sudovshchykova-Kosach (Ukrainian: Олександра Євгенівна Судовщикова-Косач, March 1867, Makariev, Kostroma Province – 27 April 1924, Mogilev or Kyiv), who was a Ukrainian journalist and writer.

== Biography ==
The daughter of Yevhen Sudovshchykov, a Russian teacher, and Hanna Khoynatska, she was born in northern Russia where her parents had been exiled for their pro-Ukrainian activities. After the death of her father in 1868, she returned with her mother to Kiev. She was educated there and joined a literary group, the Pleiada, which studied Ukrainian literature and translated foreign authors into Ukrainian.

She wrote poetry in Ukrainian, Russian and French. She also translated Ukrainian writers into French and French, Swedish and English writers into Ukrainian. In 1893, she married Mykhaylo Kosach. He was forced to move to Estonia to continue his studies because of his political views, so Oleksandra and her mother moved to Tartu. There she began writing prose and published her first collection of stories Nashi lyudy na seli (The Lives of our Peasants] in 1898.

In 1901, they returned to Kharkiv, where her husband became a professor at the University of Kharkiv. Unfortunately, he died two years later. She moved to Kiev with her daughter. She completed a law degree and worked in a court. She also became involved in the women's movement.

Some of Hrytsko Hryhorenko's works were translated into English and comprise collections From Heart to Heart (1998) and Warm the Children, O Sun (1998).
