= 2015 WNBA playoffs =

Professional women's basketball tournament

- Dates: September 17–October 14, 2015

Final positions
- Champions: Minnesota Lynx
- Runners-up: Indiana Fever

Tournament statistics
- Attendance: 8,799 per game
- Scoring leader (s): Maya Moore (Minnesota) (23.4 PPG)

Awards
- MVP: Sylvia Fowles (Minnesota)

The 2015 WNBA playoffs was the postseason tournament of the WNBA's 2015 season.

== Format ==
Following the WNBA regular season, four teams in each conference qualified for the playoffs and are seeded one to four based on their regular season record.

The first round of the playoffs, or Conference Semi-Finals, consisted of two match-ups in each conference based on the seedings (1-4 and 2-3). The two winners advanced to the second round, or Conference Finals, with a match-up between the 1-4 and 2-3 winners. At the conclusion of the Conference Finals, the winners of these series advanced to the WNBA Finals.

The Conference Semi-Finals and the Conference Finals are each best-of-three series. Series are played in a 1-1-1 format, meaning the team with home-court advantage (better record) hosts games 1 and 3, while their opponent hosts game 2. The WNBA Finals are a best-of-five series played in a 2-2-1 format, meaning the team with home-court advantage hosts games 1, 2, and 5 while their opponent hosts games 3 and 4.

=== Tiebreak procedures ===
==== Two-team tie ====
1. Better record in head-to-head games.
2. Better winning percentage within own conference.
3. Better winning percentage against all teams with .500 or better record at the end of the season.
4. Better point differential in games head-to-head.
5. Coin toss.

==== Three or more-team tie ====
1. Better winning percentage among all head-to-head games involving tied teams.
2. Better winning percentage against teams within conference (for first two rounds of playoffs) or better record against teams in the opposite conference (for Finals).
3. Better winning percentage against all teams with a .500 or better record at the end of the season.
4. Better point differential in games involving tied teams.
5. Coin toss.

== Playoff qualifying ==
=== Eastern Conference ===
Seed	Team	Record	Clinched		
Seed	Team	Record	Playoff berth	Best record in Conference	Best record in WNBA
1	New York Liberty	23–11	August 28	September 6	September 9
2	Chicago Sky	21–13	August 29	—	—
3	Indiana Fever	20–14	September 1	—	—
4	Washington Mystics	18–16	September 8	—	—

=== Western Conference ===
Seed	Team	Record	Clinched		
Seed	Team	Record	Playoff berth	Best record in Conference	Best record in WNBA
1	Minnesota Lynx	22–12	August 11	September 8	—
2	Phoenix Mercury	20–14	August 21	—	—
3	Tulsa Shock	18–16	August 30	—	—
4	Los Angeles Sparks	14–20	September 6	—	—

== Bracket ==
**Conference semifinals** Best-of-3
E1	**New York**	**2**
E4	Washington	1
**Eastern Conference**
E2	Chicago	1
E3	**Indiana**	**2**
W1	**Minnesota**	**2**
W4	Los Angeles	1
**Western Conference**
W2	**Phoenix**	**2**
W3	Tulsa	0

**Conference finals** Best-of-3
E1	New York	1
E3	**Indiana**	**2**
W1	**Minnesota**	**2**
W2	Phoenix	0

**WNBA Finals**; Best-of-5
E3	Indiana	2
W1	**Minnesota**	**3**

- **Bold** – Series winner
- Italics – Team with home-court advantage

== Eastern Conference ==
All times are in Eastern Daylight Time (UTC−4)

=== Conference semifinals ===
==== (1) New York Liberty vs. (4) Washington Mystics ====
NBATV

September 18
7:00 PM

Game 1

**Washington Mystics** **86**, New York Liberty 83 (2OT)
Scoring by quarter: 14–**21**, **22**–15, 19–**20**, **14**–13, Overtime: 7–7, **10**–7
Pts: Latta 15; Rebs: Meesseman 10; Asts: three tied 3	Pts: Prince 26; Rebs: Swords 9 Asts: Charles 5

Madison Square Garden, New York, NY
Attendance: 10,120
Referees: Michael Price, Cheryl Flores, Tom Mauer

ESPN

September 20
1:00 PM

Game 2

**New York Liberty** **86**, Washington Mystics 68
Scoring by quarter: **23**–15, 21–**22**, **26**–15, 16–16
Pts: Charles 22; Rebs: Stokes 7 Asts: Wright 6	Pts: Hill 19; Rebs: Dolson, Meesseman 5 Asts: Ruffin-Pratt 4

Verizon Center, Washington, D.C.
Attendance: 6,619
Referees: Daryl Humphrey, Denise Brooks, Kurt Walker

ESPN2

September 22
7:00 PM

Game 3

Washington Mystics 74, **New York Liberty** **79**
Scoring by quarter: **25**-15, 12-**30**, **20**-12, 17-**22**
Pts: Latta 18; Rebs: Vaughn 9 Asts: Latta 7	Pts: Charles 22; Rebs: Stokes 13; Asts: Wright 5
**New York wins series 2-1**

Madison Square Garden, New York, NY
Attendance: 9,255
Referees: Roy Gulbeyan, Sue Blauch, Lamont Simpson

Regular-season series
Washington won 3–1 in the regular-season series

June 6, 2015

Report

New York Liberty 62, **Washington Mystics 67**

Verizon Center, Washington, D.C.

June 14, 2015

Report

**Washington Mystics 74**, New York Liberty 59

Madison Square Garden, New York, NY

July 9, 2015

Report

**New York Liberty 79**, Washington Mystics 76 (OT)

Verizon Center, Washington, D.C.

September 11, 2015

Report

**Washington Mystics 82**, New York Liberty 55

Madison Square Garden, New York, NY

==== (2) Chicago Sky vs. (3) Indiana Fever ====
ESPN2

September 17
8:00 PM

Game 1

Indiana Fever 72, **Chicago Sky** **77**
Scoring by quarter: 15–**24**, **20**–12, 16–**18**, 21–**23**
Pts: Catchings 21; Rebs: Larkins 10; Asts: January 7	Pts: Quigley 20; Rebs: Delle Donne 11; Asts: Quigley 6

UIC Pavilion, Chicago, IL
Attendance: 4,098
Referees: Maj Forsberg, Jeff Smith, Eric Brewton

NBATV

September 19
7:00 PM

Game 2

Chicago Sky 82, **Indiana Fever** **89**
Scoring by quarter: 20–20, 22–**24**, 23–**25**, 17–**20**
Pts: Vandersloot 19; Rebs: de Souza 8 Asts: Vandersloot 6	Pts: Catchings 22; Rebs: Larkins 12; Asts: Zellous 8

Bankers Life Fieldhouse, Indianapolis, IN
Attendance: 7,124
Referees: Amy Bonner, Lamont Simpson, Roy Gulbeyan

NBATV

September 21
8:00 PM

Game 3

**Indiana Fever** **100**, Chicago Sky 89
Scoring by quarter: 28–28, **24**–19, **19**–16, **29**–26
Pts: Catchings 27; Rebs: Catchings 9 Asts: January 8	Pts: Delle Donne 40; Rebs: Breland 8 Asts: Vandersloot 14
**Indiana wins series 2–1**

Allstate Arena, Rosemont, IL
Attendance: 2,882
Referees: Denise Brooks, Byron Jarrett, Thomas Nunez

Regular-season series
Chicago won 4–0 in the regular-season series

June 5, 2015

Report

Indiana Fever 72, **Chicago Sky 95**

Allstate Arena, Rosemont, IL

June 14, 2015

Report

**Chicago Sky 98**, Indiana Fever 72

Bankers Life Fieldhouse, Indianapolis, IN

June 26, 2015

Report

**Chicago Sky 83**, Indiana Fever 77

Bankers Life Fieldhouse, Indianapolis, IN

August 4, 2015

Report

Indiana Fever 82, **Chicago Sky 106**

Allstate Arena, Rosemont, IL

=== Conference Finals: (1) New York Liberty vs. (3) Indiana Fever ===
ESPN2

September 23
7:00 PM

Game 1

Indiana Fever 67, **New York Liberty** **84**
Scoring by quarter: 18–**26**, **24**–22, 7–**16**, 18–**20**
Pts: Johnson 12; Rebs: Zellous 5 Asts: four tied 4	Pts: Stokes 21; Rebs: Charles 7 Asts: Charles 9

Madison Square Garden, New York, NY
Attendance: 7,229
Referees: Denise Brooks, Byron Jarrett, Eric Brewton

ESPN

September 27
1:00 PM

Game 2

New York Liberty 64, **Indiana Fever** **70**
Scoring by quarter: **22**–17, **22**–12, 9–**13**, 11–**28**
Pts: Charles 25; Rebs: Stokes 11; Asts: Wright 5	Pts: Tamika Catchings 25; Rebs: Catchings 7 Asts: January 4

Bankers Life Fieldhouse, Indianapolis, IN
Attendance: 7,505
Referees: Sue Blauch, Maj Forsberg, Tom Mauer

ESPN2

September 29
7:00 PM

Game 3

**Indiana Fever** **66**, New York Liberty 51
Scoring by quarter: **15**–13, **18**–9, 16–**18**, **17**–11
Pts: Coleman 15; Rebs: Larkins 8 Asts: January 8	Pts: Wiggins 15; Rebs: Charles 10; Asts: Prince 4
**Indiana wins series 2-1**

Madison Square Garden, New York, NY
Attendance: 10,120
Referees: Michael Price, Roy Gulbeyan, Lamont Simpson

Regular-season series
Indiana won 4–1 in the regular-season series

June 9, 2015

Report

Indiana Fever 79, **New York Liberty 86**

Madison Square Garden, New York, NY

June 19, 2015

Report

**Indiana Fever 80**, New York Liberty 63

Madison Square Garden, New York, NY

July 29, 2015

Report

New York Liberty 72, **Indiana Fever 84**

Bankers Life Fieldhouse, Indianapolis, IN

August 23, 2015

Report

New York Liberty 79, **Indiana Fever 80**

Bankers Life Fieldhouse, Indianapolis, IN

September 13, 2015

Report

New York Liberty 76, **Indiana Fever 81**

Bankers Life Fieldhouse, Indianapolis, IN

== Western Conference ==
All times are in Eastern Daylight Time (UTC−4)

=== Conference semifinals ===
==== (1) Minnesota Lynx vs. (4) Los Angeles Sparks ====
NBATV

September 18
9:00 PM

Game 1

Los Angeles Sparks 65, **Minnesota Lynx** **67**
Scoring by quarter: 15–**22**, **21**–11, 13–**22**, **16**–12
Pts: Parker 16; Rebs: Parker 9 Asts: Parker 4	Pts: Moore 33; Rebs: Fowles 9 Asts: Cruz 5

Target Center, Minneapolis, MN
Attendance: 8,333
Referees: Sue Blauch, Daryl Humphrey, Jeff Wooten

ESPN

September 20
3:00 PM

Game 2

Minnesota Lynx 71, **Los Angeles Sparks** **81**
Scoring by quarter: 23–**24**, 12–**29**, **20**–10, 16–**18**
Pts: Moore 27; Rebs: three tied 7 Asts: Whalen 5	Pts: Parker 25; Rebs: Parker 10; Asts: Dabović 7

Walter Pyramid, Long Beach, CA
Attendance: 3,112
Referees: Maj Forsberg, Billy Smith, Michael Price

ESPN2

September 22
9:00 PM

Game 3

Los Angeles Sparks 80, **Minnesota Lynx** **91**
Scoring by quarter: 10-**18**, 20-**25**, **27**-20, 23-**28**
Pts: Parker 28; Rebs: Parker 13; Asts: Ogwumike, Parker 4	Pts: Moore 20; Rebs: Moore 8 Asts: Brunson 5
**Minnesota wins series 2-1**

Target Center, Minneapolis, MN
Attendance: 9,014
Referees: Eric Brewton, Amy Bonner, Tom Mauer

Regular-season series
Minnesota won 3–1 in the regular-season series

June 16, 2015

Report

**Minnesota Lynx 67**, Los Angeles Sparks 52

Staples Center, Los Angeles, CA

July 29, 2015

Report

Los Angeles Sparks 76, **Minnesota Lynx 82**

Target Center, Minneapolis, MN

August 4, 2015

Report

Minnesota Lynx 61, **Los Angeles Sparks 83**

Staples Center, Los Angeles, CA

August 9, 2015

Report

Los Angeles Sparks 64, **Minnesota Lynx 72**

Target Center, Minneapolis, MN

==== (2) Phoenix Mercury vs. (3) Tulsa Shock ====
ESPN2

September 17
10:00 PM

Game 1

Tulsa Shock 55, **Phoenix Mercury** **88**
Scoring by quarter: 15–**22**, 7–**30**, **22**–16, 11–**20**
Pts: Sims 18; Rebs: Paris 7 Asts: Sims 3	Pts: Griner 18; Rebs: Griner 8 Asts: Mitchell 6

Talking Stick Resort Arena, Phoenix, AZ
Attendance: 8,509
Referees: Denise Brooks, Byron Jarrett, Thomas Nunez

NBATV

September 19
9:00 PM

Game 2

**Phoenix Mercury** **91**, Tulsa Shock 67
Scoring by quarter: 19–19, **22**–12, **23**–17, **27**–19
Pts: Griner 23; Rebs: Griner 12; Asts: Xargay, Mitchell 3	Pts: Sims 22; Rebs: Paris 8 Asts: Sims 7
**Phoenix wins series 2–0**

BOK Center, Tulsa, OK
Attendance: 3,261
Referees: Sue Blauch, Tony Dawkins, Eric Brewton

Regular-season series
Phoenix won 3–2 in the regular-season series

July 2, 2015

Report

Tulsa Shock 55, **Phoenix Mercury 86**

US Airways Center, Phoenix, AZ

July 30, 2015

Report

**Phoenix Mercury 78**, Tulsa Shock 66

BOK Center, Tulsa, OK

August 4, 2015

Report

Tulsa Shock 84, **Phoenix Mercury 87 (OT)**

US Airways Centers, Phoenix, AZ

August 18, 2015

Report

Phoenix Mercury 59, **Tulsa Shock 74**

BOK Center, Tulsa, OK

September 13, 2015

Report

Phoenix Mercury 87, **Tulsa Shock 91**

BOK Center, Tulsa, OK

=== Conference Finals: (1) Minnesota Lynx vs. (2) Phoenix Mercury ===
ESPN2

September 24
8:00 PM

Game 1

Phoenix Mercury 60, **Minnesota Lynx** **67**
Scoring by quarter: **21**–14, 11–**21**, 14–14, 14–**18**
Pts: Bonner 21; Rebs: Dupree 12; Asts: Bonner 5	Pts: Moore 19; Rebs: Brunson 19; Asts: Whalen 5

Target Center, Minneapolis, MN
Attendance: 8,732
Referees: Michael Price, Roy Gulbeyan, Maj Forsberg

ESPN

September 27
3:00 PM

Game 2

**Minnesota Lynx** **72**, Phoenix Mercury 71
Scoring by quarter: **25**–15, 16–**26**, 17–**18**, **14**–12
Pts: Moore 40; Rebs: Fowles 14; Asts: Moore, Whalen 4	Pts: Dupree 16; Rebs: Currie 7 Asts: Currie 6
**Minnesota wins series 2-0**

Talking Stick Resort Arena, Phoenix, AZ
Attendance: 9,871
Referees: Kurt Walker, Amy Bonner, Eric Brewton

Regular-season series
Phoenix won 3–2 in the regular-season series

June 14, 2015

Report

Minnesota Lynx 66, **Phoenix Mercury 81**

US Airways Center, Phoenix, AZ

June 27, 2015

Report

Phoenix Mercury 56, **Minnesota Lynx 71**

Target Center, Minneapolis, MN

August 7, 2015

Report

Minnesota Lynx 66, **Phoenix Mercury 73**

US Airways Center, Phoenix, AZ

August 23, 2015

Report

Minnesota Lynx 67, **Phoenix Mercury 79**

US Airways Center, Phoenix, AZ

August 30, 2015

Report

Phoenix Mercury 61, **Minnesota Lynx 71**

Target Center, Minneapolis, MN

== WNBA Finals ==
=== Minnesota Lynx vs. Indiana Fever ===
ABC

October 4
3:00 PM

Game 1

**Indiana Fever** **75**, Minnesota Lynx 69
Scoring by quarter: 10–10, **25**–19, **19**–18, 21–**22**
Pts: January 19; Rebs: Larkins 8 Asts: January 6	Pts: Moore 27; Rebs: Moore 12; Asts: Augustus, Whalen 4

Target Center, Minneapolis, MN
Attendance: 11,023
Referees: Sue Blauch, Eric Brewton, Kurt Walker

ESPN2

October 6
8:00 PM

Game 2

Indiana Fever 71, **Minnesota Lynx** **77**
Scoring by quarter: **24**–20, 17–**19**, 18–**24**, 12–**14**
Pts: January 17; Rebs: Catchings, Larkins 9 Asts: Catchings, January 5	Pts: Fowles 21; Rebs: Fowles 9 Asts: Cruz, Moore 5

Target Center, Minneapolis, MN
Attendance: 12,134
Referees: Michael Price, Maj Forsberg, Lamont Simpson

ESPN2

October 9
8:00 PM

Game 3

**Minnesota Lynx** **80**, Indiana Fever 77
Scoring by quarter: **20**–19, 18–**23**, **21**–15, **21**–20
Pts: Moore 24; Rebs: Fowles 11; Asts: Cruz 5	Pts: Johnson 17; Rebs: Catchings 10; Asts: January 8

Bankers Life Fieldhouse, Indianapolis, IN
Attendance: 16,332
Referees: Denise Brooks, Roy Gulbeyan, Tom Mauer

ESPN

October 11
8:30 PM

Game 4

Minnesota Lynx 69, **Indiana Fever** **75**
Scoring by quarter: **20**–15, 12–**21**, 14–**22**, **23**–17
Pts: Moore 20; Rebs: Moore 8 Asts: six tied 2	Pts: Johnson 15; Rebs: Larkins 6 Asts: January 5

Bankers Life Fieldhouse, Indianapolis, IN
Attendance: 10,582
Referees: Sue Blauch, Eric Brewton, Maj Forsberg

ESPN2

October 14
8:00 PM

Game 5

Indiana Fever 52, **Minnesota Lynx** **69**
Scoring by quarter: **17**–15, 4–**12**, 8–**21**, **23**–21
Pts: Catchings 18; Rebs: Catchings 11; Asts: January, Zellous 3	Pts: Fowles 20; Rebs: Brunson 14; Asts: Moore 5
**Minnesota wins series 3-2**

Target Center, Minneapolis, MN
Attendance: 18,933
Referees: Michael Price, Denise Brooks, Roy Gulbeyan

Regular-season series
Minnesota won 2–0 in the regular-season series

June 6, 2015

Report

**Minnesota Lynx** 78, Indiana Fever 69

Bankers Life Fieldhouse, Indianapolis, IN

September 4, 2015

Report

Indiana Fever 65, **Minnesota Lynx 81**

Target Center, Minneapolis, MN
