= 2015 WNBA season =

- League: Women's National Basketball Association
- Sport: Basketball
- Duration: June 5 – October 14, 2015
- Games: 34
- Teams: 12
- Total attendance: 1,465,432
- Average attendance: 7,183
- TV partner(s): ABC, ESPN, ESPN2, NBA TV

Draft
- Top draft pick: (United States) Jewell Loyd
- Picked by: Seattle Storm

Regular season
- Top seed: New York Liberty
- Season MVP: (United States) Elena Delle Donne (Chicago)
- Top scorer: (United States) Elena Delle Donne (Chicago)

Playoffs
- Finals champions: Minnesota Lynx
- Runners-up: Indiana Fever
- Finals MVP: (United States) Sylvia Fowles (Minnesota)

WNBA seasons
- ← 2014 2016 →

The 2015 WNBA season was the 19th season of the Women's National Basketball Association (WNBA). The regular season started on June 5 and concluded on September 13 and playoffs started on September 17 and concluded on October 14.

The Minnesota Lynx beat the Indiana Fever 69–52 in game five of the Finals on October 14 to clinch a third WNBA title in five years.

== Notable occurrences ==
- On February 3, 2015, the Phoenix Mercury announced that superstar Diana Taurasi would not play in 2015. Her Russian club team, UMMC Ekaterinburg, offered her more than her WNBA season salary to rest during the 2015 WNBA season. Some in the league feared this would cause more star players to reach similar agreements.
- On June 4, 2015, Tulsa player Glory Johnson announced that she is pregnant and would miss all of the 2015 WNBA season.
- On July 23, 2015, The WNBA approved the relocation of the Tulsa Shock to Dallas-Fort Worth. The move is the first franchise relocation or fold since the 2009 Sacramento Monarchs folded, and the Detroit Shock moved to Tulsa. At the time, the Shock were the only WNBA franchise to relocate twice.
- On October 14, 2015, The Minnesota Lynx won their third WNBA title in five years, beating the Indiana Fever 3–2.
- On November 4, 2015, shortly after the 2015 season concluded, WNBA President Laurel Richie announced her resignation, effective November 9, 2015. She was the league's 3rd president.

== Draft ==
On August 21, 2014, the 2015 WNBA Draft Lottery took place. The Seattle Storm, who had a league-worst record of 12–22 last season, won the draft lottery and had the right to pick first in the 2015 draft. In the draft, held on April 16, the Storm made Jewell Loyd of Notre Dame the top pick.

== Media coverage ==
Games aired on ESPN (1 regular season game), ESPN2 (10 regular season games), ABC (All-Star Game) and NBA TV (47 regular season games).

== Regular season ==
=== Standings ===
Eastern Conference

Eastern Conference	W	L	PCT	GB	Home	Road	Conf.
x - New York Liberty	23	11	.676	–	12–5	11–6	13–9
x - Chicago Sky	21	13	.618	2	13–4	8–9	14–8
x - Indiana Fever	20	14	.588	3	11–6	9–8	13–9
x - Washington Mystics	18	16	.529	5	11–6	7–10	10–12
e - Atlanta Dream	15	19	.441	8	9–8	6–11	10–12
e - Connecticut Sun	15	19	.441	8	8–9	7–10	6–16

Western Conference

Western Conference	W	L	PCT	GB	Home	Road	Conf.
z - Minnesota Lynx	22	12	.647	–	13–4	9–8	16–6
x - Phoenix Mercury	20	14	.588	2	13–4	7–10	15–7
x - Tulsa Shock	18	16	.529	4	12–5	6–11	11–11
x - Los Angeles Sparks	14	20	.412	8	9–8	5–12	10–12
e - Seattle Storm	10	24	.294	12	8–9	2–15	8–14
e - San Antonio Stars	8	26	.235	14	7–10	1–16	6–16

Notes

z – Clinched Conference
x – Clinched playoff spot
e – Eliminated from playoffs

== Playoffs ==
**Conference semifinals** Best-of-3
E1	**New York**	**2**
E4	Washington	1
**Eastern Conference**
E2	Chicago	1
E3	**Indiana**	**2**
W1	**Minnesota**	**2**
W4	Los Angeles	1
**Western Conference**
W2	**Phoenix**	**2**
W3	Tulsa	0

**Conference finals** Best-of-3
E1	New York	1
E3	**Indiana**	**2**
W1	**Minnesota**	**2**
W2	Phoenix	0

**WNBA Finals**; Best-of-5
E3	Indiana	2
W1	**Minnesota**	**3**

- **Bold** – Series winner
- Italics – Team with home-court advantage

== Awards ==
=== Individual ===
Award		Winner	Team	Position	Votes/Statistic
Most Valuable Player (MVP)		Elena Delle Donne	Chicago Sky	Forward / Guard	38 out of 39
Finals MVP		Sylvia Fowles	Minnesota Lynx	Center	
Rookie of the Year		Jewell Loyd	Seattle Storm	Guard	21 out of 39
Most Improved Player		Kelsey Bone	Connecticut Sun	Center	14 out of 39
Defensive Player of the Year		Brittney Griner	Phoenix Mercury	Center	33 out of 39
Sixth Woman of the Year		Allie Quigley	Chicago Sky	Guard	24 out of 39
Kim Perrot Sportsmanship Award		DeLisha Milton-Jones	Atlanta Dream	Forward	11 out of 39
Peak Performers	**Scoring**	Elena Delle Donne	Chicago Sky	Forward / Guard	23.4 PPG
Peak Performers	**Rebounding**	Courtney Paris	Tulsa Shock	Center	9.3 RPG
Peak Performers	**Assists**	Courtney Vandersloot	Chicago Sky	Guard	5.8 APG
Coach of the Year		Bill Laimbeer	New York Liberty	Coach	23 out of 39

=== Team ===
Award		Guard	Guard	Forward	Forward	Center
All-WNBA	**First Team**	DeWanna Bonner	Angel McCoughtry	Elena Delle Donne	Maya Moore	Tina Charles
All-WNBA	**Second Team**	Epiphanny Prince	Courtney Vandersloot	Candace Parker	Tamika Catchings	Brittney Griner
All-Defensive	**First Team**	Briann January	Angel McCoughtry	Nneka Ogwumike	Tamika Catchings	Brittney Griner
All-Defensive	**Second Team**	Tanisha Wright	DeWanna Bonner	Sancho Lyttle	Tina Charles	Kiah Stokes
All-Rookie Team		Jewell Loyd	Brittany Boyd	Ramu Tokashiki	Natalie Achonwa (tie)	Kiah Stokes
All-Rookie Team		Jewell Loyd	Brittany Boyd	Ramu Tokashiki	Ana Dabović (tie)	Kiah Stokes

=== Players of the Week ===
Week ending	Eastern Conference		Western Conference	
Week ending	Player	Team	Player	Team
June 14	Elena Delle Donne (3)	Chicago Sky	DeWanna Bonner	Phoenix Mercury
June 21	Elena Delle Donne (3)	Chicago Sky	Skylar Diggins	Tulsa Shock
June 28	Elena Delle Donne (3)	Chicago Sky	Lindsay Whalen	Minnesota Lynx
July 5	Tamika Catchings	Indiana Fever	Nneka Ogwumike	Los Angeles Sparks
July 13	Cappie Pondexter	Chicago Sky	Maya Moore (3)	Minnesota Lynx
July 20	Tina Charles (2)	New York Liberty	Maya Moore (3)	Minnesota Lynx
August 3	Tina Charles (2)	New York Liberty	Maya Moore (3)	Minnesota Lynx
August 10	Elena Delle Donne (4)	Chicago Sky	Brittney Griner	Phoenix Mercury
August 17	Epiphanny Prince	New York Liberty	Maya Moore (4)	Minnesota Lynx
August 24	Elena Delle Donne (5)	Chicago Sky	Candace Parker	Los Angeles Sparks
August 31	Epiphanny Prince (2)	New York Liberty	Odyssey Sims	Tulsa Shock
September 8	Courtney Vandersloot	Chicago Sky	Candace Parker (2)	Los Angeles Sparks

=== Players of the Month ===
Month	Eastern Conference		Western Conference	
Month	Player	Team	Player	Team
June	Elena Delle Donne	Chicago Sky	Skylar Diggins	Tulsa Shock
July	Tina Charles	New York Liberty	Maya Moore	Minnesota Lynx
August	Epiphanny Prince	New York Liberty	Candace Parker	Los Angeles Sparks

=== Rookies of the Month ===
Month	Player	Team
June	Natalie Achonwa	Indiana Fever
July	Jewell Loyd	Seattle Storm
August	Kiah Stokes	New York Liberty

== Coaches ==
=== Eastern Conference ===
- Atlanta Dream: Michael Cooper
- Chicago Sky: Pokey Chatman
- Connecticut Sun: Anne Donovan
- Indiana Fever: Stephanie White
- New York Liberty: Bill Laimbeer
- Washington Mystics: Mike Thibault

=== Western Conference ===
- Los Angeles Sparks: Brian Agler
- Minnesota Lynx: Cheryl Reeve
- Phoenix Mercury: Sandy Brondello
- San Antonio Silver Stars: Dan Hughes
- Seattle Storm: Jenny Boucek
- Tulsa Shock: Fred Williams
