= Houston Comets (1997–2008) =

Former Women's National Basketball Association team in Houston, Texas

- Conference: Western
- Leagues: WNBA
- Founded: 1997
- Dissolved: 2008
- History: Houston Comets; 1997–2008
- Arena: Compaq Center (1997–2003); Toyota Center (2004–2007); Reliant Arena (2008)
- Location: Houston, Texas
- Team colors: Red, navy blue, silver
- Championships: 4 (1997, 1998, 1999, 2000)
- Conference titles: 4 (1997, 1998, 1999, 2000) (Note: The WNBA awarded conference championships to the winners of the Conference Finals in the playoffs from 1998 to 2015.)
- Retired numbers: 2 (10, 14)
- Website: comets.wnba.com

The Houston Comets were an American professional basketball team based in Houston. The Comets compete in the Women's National Basketball Association (WNBA) as a member of the Western Conference. Formed in 1997, the team was one of the original teams of the WNBA and won the first four championships of the league's existence. They were undefeated in the WNBA Finals; the Seattle Storm and the Golden State Valkyries are the only other teams undefeated in the finals. The Comets were the first dynasty of the WNBA and are tied with the Minnesota Lynx and Seattle Storm for the most championships of any WNBA franchise. Despite their success, the team was folded and disbanded by the league in 2008 during the height of the Great Recession because new ownership could not be found.

The Comets were known for courting great women's basketball stars. The team had among its members Cynthia Cooper (the WNBA's first MVP); college and national team standout Sheryl Swoopes; Kim Perrot, who succumbed to cancer in 1999; and college stars Michelle Snow and Tina Thompson.

On March 27, 2026, sources told ESPN that the Fertitta family, owners of the NBA's Houston Rockets, agreed to purchase the Connecticut Sun and relocate them to Houston, where they would be renamed the Houston Comets and begin playing in 2027. However, the history of the original Comets were not transferred to new Comets, who had the Sun’s team history and records follow the organization to Houston.

== History ==
=== 1997–2000: Building the first dynasty of the WNBA ===
The Comets were one of the founding teams in the WNBA. Their first four seasons were marked by dominant success in the league, as they became the WNBA's first dynasty. They capped off the league's inaugural season in 1997 with a win over the New York Liberty in the WNBA championship game to win the WNBA's first championship.

When the league expanded the next season, the Comets were moved from the Eastern Conference to the Western Conference. In 1998, they finished 27–3 – a .900 winning percentage, a WNBA record that still stands. They went on to repeat as champions, defeating the Phoenix Mercury in the first-ever WNBA Finals, which had become a three-game championship series.

In 1999, led by what was already known as the Big Three, (Cynthia Cooper, Sheryl Swoopes and Tina Thompson), the Comets survived a stunning last-second, half-court, buzzer beater by the Liberty's Teresa Weatherspoon in Game 2 -- as it appeared the Comets were set to win the title -- to beat the Liberty in three games and win their third straight title, this one after the death of teammate Kim Perrot, who died of cancer.

In 2000, behind league MVP Sheryl Swoopes and eventual WNBA Finals MVP Cynthia Cooper, the Comets beat the Liberty again, this time in two games, to win their fourth straight title cementing themselves as the greatest WNBA team ever assembled. This was the Comets' last championship and last Finals appearance in franchise history.

=== 2001–2006: The years of change and rebuilding ===
The Comets suffered two blows before the 2001 season--Cooper retired and Swoopes tore her ACL. Despite playing without the two biggest stars from their title runs, Houston made the playoffs with a 19–13 record before falling in the first round to the eventual champion Los Angeles Sparks. In 2002, Swoopes won her second MVP and the Comets finished 24–8, but lost to the Utah Starzz in 3 games.

In 2003, they qualified to the playoffs for the 7th straight year, but they lost in the first round to the Sacramento Monarchs in 3 games. They missed the playoffs for the first time in franchise history with a record of 13–21 in 2004, but returned in 2005 with a 19–15 record, finishing 3rd. In the first round, the Comets knocked out the 2004 defending champion Seattle Storm in 3 games, but lost in the conference finals to the Sacramento Monarchs in a sweep, which Sacramento later became WNBA Champions in 2005. Houston would return to the playoffs with an 18–16 record, but lost to the 2005 defending champion Sacramento Monarchs in another sweep. 2006 was the last playoff appearance for the Houston Comets.

After the Comets' season ended in 2006, the team went through a major front-office changes during the off-season. In October 2006, team owner Leslie Alexander – who also owned the Houston Rockets -- announced he was selling the Comets, and longtime head coach Van Chancellor resigned in January 2007.

=== 2007: New ownership and a new home ===
On January 31, 2007, the WNBA Board of Governors approved the sale of the team to Hilton Koch, a Houston-based mattress and furniture businessman. Two weeks later, Comets assistant coach Karleen Thompson was named to become the team's new head coach and general manager for the 2007 season.

For the 2007 season, they would miss the playoffs for the second time in franchise history after starting the season 0–10, resulting in a 13–21 record.

On December 12, 2007, team owner Hilton Koch announced that the Comets would be moving from the Toyota Center to Reliant Arena for the 2008 WNBA season. This resulted in a loss of fans. The Toyota Center drew 13,000 fans, but the Reliant Arena could only house 7,200. In 2008, the Comets' final year, they only drew an average 6,000 fans per game and sold out four games.

=== 2008: End of the original era ===
In 2008, Koch put the team up for sale, with an asking price of $10 million, however no investors stepped up. The WNBA took over management of the Comets and disbanded the team in December 2008. They stated that they would only be suspending operations in 2009, which some people saw as a sign that the franchise could be revived if an investor came in. Comets players were sent off to other teams in a dispersal draft.

League president Donna Orender said that the collapse of the Comets was not a sign that the WNBA was in trouble. Cynthia Cooper said that the loss of the Comets was "disturbing news" and that the Comets were integral to the WNBA.

The original Comets played their final home game on September 15, 2008 at the Strahan Coliseum on the campus of Texas State due to Hurricane Ike. They defeated the Sacramento Monarchs 90–81. They finished the season 17–17 and missed the playoffs for the third time in their history.

=== Revival of the team name ===
In April 2024, the Houston Rockets, now owned by Tilman Fertitta, submitted to the WNBA to revive the Comets franchise and intends to retain the team's branding if successfully landing an expansion bid. On March 27, 2026, the Associated Press reported that Fertitta agreed to purchase the Connecticut Sun and relocate the franchise to Houston, where they would take on the Comets name upon approval from the WNBA Board of Governors. On May 13, 2026, the WNBA and NBA Boards of Governors unanimously approved the sale of the Sun to Fertitta and the franchise's relocation to Houston, where the team would revive the Houston Comets name beginning with the 2027 season. On October 22, 2026, It was announced that the Comets games will air broadcast live on KHOU and KTBU beginning with the 2027 season and will also simulcast locally on Space City Home Network as well. On October 29, 2026, Comets has revealed a brand new logo similar to the original design.

== Season-by-season records ==
Season	Team	Conference		Regular season			Playoff Results	Head coach
Season	Team	Conference		W	L	PCT	Playoff Results	Head coach
Houston Comets
1997	1997	East	1st	18	10	.643	Won WNBA Semifinal (Charlotte, 70–54); Won WNBA Championship (New York, 65–51)	Van Chancellor
1998	1998	West	1st	27	3	.900	Won WNBA Semifinals (Charlotte, 2–0); Won WNBA Finals (Phoenix, 2–1)	Van Chancellor
1999	1999	West	1st	26	6	.813	Won Conference Finals (Los Angeles, 2–1); Won WNBA Finals (New York, 2–1)	Van Chancellor
2000	2000	West	2nd	27	5	.844	Won Conference Semifinals (Sacramento, 2–0); Won Conference Finals (Los Angeles, 2–0); Won WNBA Finals (New York, 2–0)	Van Chancellor
2001	2001	West	4th	19	13	.594	Lost Conference Semifinals (Los Angeles, 0–2)	Van Chancellor
2002	2002	West	2nd	24	8	.750	Lost Conference Semifinals (Utah, 1–2)	Van Chancellor
2003	2003	West	2nd	20	14	.588	Lost Conference Semifinals (Sacramento, 1–2)	Van Chancellor
2004	2004	West	6th	13	21	.382		Van Chancellor
2005	2005	West	3rd	19	15	.559	Won Conference Semifinals (Seattle, 2–1); Lost Conference Finals (Sacramento, 0–2)	Van Chancellor
2006	2006	West	3rd	18	16	.529	Lost Conference Semifinals (Sacramento, 0–2)	Van Chancellor
2007	2007	West	5th	13	21	.382		Karleen Thompson
2008	2008	West	5th	17	17	.500		Karleen Thompson
Regular Season				241	149	.618	4 Conference Championships	
Playoffs				20	14	.588	4 WNBA Championships	

=== Team owners ===
- Leslie Alexander (1997–2006)
- Hilton Koch (2007–2008)
- WNBA (2008)

== Players ==
=== Retired numbers ===
Houston Comets retired numbers
No.	Player	Position	Tenure
10	Kim Perrot	G	1997–98
14	Cynthia Cooper	G	1997–2000, 2003

=== Former Comets ===
- Matee Ajavon
- Janeth Arcain
- Octavia Blue
- Latasha Byears
- Dominique Canty
- Cynthia Cooper, formerly the head coach of the Texas Southern Tigers Women's Basketball Team
- Tamecka Dixon
- Ukari Figgs
- Nekeshia Henderson
- Sonja Henning
- Tammy Jackson
- Shannon Johnson
- Tiffani Johnson
- Amanda Lassiter
- Edwige Lawson
- Tynesha Lewis
- Rebecca Lobo
- Sancho Lyttle
- Mwadi Mabika
- Hamchétou Maïga
- Kim Perrot
- Jennifer Rizzotti, formerly the head coach of the George Washington Colonials (now Revolutionaries) women's basketball team
- Michelle Snow
- Dawn Staley, now the head coach of the South Carolina Gamecocks Women's Basketball Team
- Sheryl Swoopes, formerly an assistant coach of Texas Tech Red Raiders Women's Basketball Team
- Lindsay Taylor
- Tina Thompson, formerly the head coach of Virginia Cavaliers Women's Basketball Team
- Amaya Valdemoro
- Coquese Washington, formerly the assistant head coach of Notre Dame Fighting Irish Women's Basketball Team
- Kara Wolters

=== FIBA Hall of Fame ===
Houston Comets Hall of Famers
Players
No.	Player	Position	Tenure	Inducted
9	Janeth Arcain	G	1997–2003, 2005	2019
13	Amaya Valdemoro	F	1998–2000	2023

== Coaches and others ==
Head coaches:

- Van Chancellor (1997–2007) (served as the head women's basketball coach at Louisiana State University from 2007 to 2011)
- Karleen Thompson (2007–2008)

General managers

- Carroll Dawson (1997–2007)
- Karleen Thompson (2007–08)

== Notes ==
Sporting positions
Preceded by Inaugural Champions	WNBA Champions; 1997 (First title); 1998 (Second title); 1999 (Third title); 2000 (Fourth title)	Succeeded by Los Angeles Sparks
Preceded by Inaugural Champions	WNBA Western Conference Champions; 1998 (First title); Co-Champions with Phoenix Mercury; 1999 (Second title); 2000 (Third title)	Succeeded by Los Angeles Sparks
Preceded by Inaugural Champions	WNBA Eastern Conference Champions; 1997 (First title); Co-Champions with New York Liberty	Succeeded by No Championship Awarded
