= 2007 Houston Comets season =

- Head coach: Karleen Thompson
- Arena: Toyota Center

Results
- Record: 13–21 (.382)
- Place: 5th (Western)
- Playoff finish: Did not qualify

The 2007 WNBA season was the 11th season for the Houston Comets. The team started the season 0-10, finishing 13-11 in the remainder part of the season, and missing the playoffs for the first time in four years. It was also their last year playing at the Toyota Center.

== Offseason ==
=== Dispersal Draft ===
With the folding of the Charlotte Sting, the league held a dispersal draft prior to the 2007 WNBA draft. The order of teams picking players was based on their 2006 records. The Comets would be selecting 8th.

Round	Pick	Player	Nationality	School/Team/Country
1	8	Yelena Leuchanka	Belarus	West Virginia; Charlotte Sting

=== WNBA draft ===
Round	Pick	Player	Nationality	School/Team/Country
1	8	Ashley Shields	United States	Southwest Tennessee CC
2	14	Dee Davis	United States	Vanderbilt
3	34	Kristen Newlin	United States	Stanford

=== Trades and Roster Changes ===
Date	Trade
January 11, 2007	Waived Tamecka Dixon
March 5, 2007	Signed Tasha Butts
March 7, 2007	Signed Hamchétou Maïga-Ba
April 5, 2007	Signed Latasha Byears
April 24, 2007	Waived Lauren Neaves, Ashely Awkward, and Fatima Maddox
April 26, 2007	Signed Jae Kingi-Cross
April 26, 2007	Waived Monica Roberts
April 27, 2007	Waived Desire Wheeler
May 1, 2007	Waived Coretta Brown, LaTasha Butts, Alisha Gladden, and Giuliana Mendiola
May 5, 2007	Waived Edna Campbell
May 13, 2007	Waived Amber Metoyer, Kristen Newlin, and Amber Obaze
May 16, 2007	Waived Jae Kingi-Cross
May 18, 2007	Signed Jessica Dickson
May 18, 2007	Waived Jillian Robbins and Yelena Leuchanka
May 23, 2007	Waived Jessica Dickson and Erin Grant
May 24, 2007	Signed Tamara Moore
May 30, 2007	Signed Barbara Turner
June 11, 2007	Waived Dee Davis
June 13, 2007	Signed Crystal Smith
July 1, 2007	Waived Tamara Moore and Tari Phillips
July 2, 2007	Signed Tamecka Dixon
July 4, 2007	Signed Erin Grant

== Regular season ==
=== Season standings ===
Western Conference	W	L	PCT	GB	Home	Road	Conf.
Phoenix Mercury ^{x}	23	11	.676	–	12–5	11–6	17–5
San Antonio Silver Stars ^{x}	20	14	.588	3.0	9–8	11–6	13–9
Sacramento Monarchs ^{x}	19	15	.559	4.0	12–5	7–10	12–10
Seattle Storm ^{x}	17	17	.500	6.0	12–5	5–12	11–11
Houston Comets ^{o}	13	21	.382	10.0	7–10	6–11	10–12
Minnesota Lynx ^{o}	10	24	.294	13.0	7–10	3–14	8–14
Los Angeles Sparks ^{o}	10	24	.294	13.0	5–12	5–12	6–16

=== Season schedule ===
Date	Opponent	Score	Result	Record
May 19	@ Seattle	69-82	Loss	0-1
May 25	@ Phoenix	85-111	Loss	0-2
May 29	San Antonio	71-82	Loss	0-3
June 2	Detroit	71-77	Loss	0-4
June 6	@ Indiana	59-84	Loss	0-5
June 8	Connecticut	77-88	Loss	0-6
June 11	Sacramento	67-82	Loss	0-7
June 13	@ Los Angeles	71-74	Loss	0-8
June 15	@ Seattle	71-84	Loss	0-9
June 16	@ Sacramento	63-75	Loss	0-10
June 20	Los Angeles	74-64	Win	1-10
June 22	Washington	95-85	Win	2-10
June 24	@ Phoenix	85-90	Loss	2-11
June 26	San Antonio	75-67	Win	3-11
June 28	Seattle	81-76	Win	4-11
June 30	Phoenix	75-92	Loss	4-12
July 6	Seattle	55-71	Loss	4-13
July 8	@ Minnesota	79-67	Win	5-13
July 10	Indiana	77-79	Loss	5-14
July 12	Minnesota	87-77	Win	6-14
July 18	@ Washington	58-65	Loss	6-15
July 20	@ New York	80-74	Win	7-15
July 22	@ Connecticut	79-81	Loss	7-16
July 27	@ San Antonio	69-63	Win	8-16
July 29	@ Chicago	70-88	Loss	8-17
July 31	Phoenix	74-76	Loss	8-18
August 3	Los Angeles	66-56	Win	9-18
August 4	@ Minnesota	80-77	Win	10-18
August 7	New York	71-77	Loss	10-19
August 10	Sacramento	83-75	Win	11-19
August 11	@ San Antonio	60-63	Loss	11-20
August 14	@ Detroit	81-73	Win	12-20
August 16	Chicago	70-81	Loss	12-21
August 19	@ Los Angeles	82-72	Win	13-21

== Player stats ==
Player	GP	REB	AST	STL	BLK	PTS
Tina Thompson	34	229	94	29	23	639
Michelle Snow	34	230	47	18	35	366
Hamchetou Maiga-Ba	34	137	77	57	3	310
Tamecka Dixon	18	57	57	24	6	216
Sancho Lyttle	31	164	30	37	20	183
Crystal Smith	27	53	72	34	3	170
Latasha Byears	30	75	16	23	5	151
Ashley Shields	26	33	20	10	1	137
Roneeka Hodges	29	30	27	13	0	102
Barbara Turner	22	42	20	8	4	92
Tamara Moore	15	25	44	16	2	58
Erin Grant	17	19	37	7	0	25
Sheryl Swoopes	3	17	11	5	1	23
Mistie Williams	19	28	5	5	6	22
Tari Phillips	7	5	1	3	0	10
Dee Davis	3	0	0	0	0	6
