= 2008 Houston Comets season =

- Head coach: Karleen Thompson
- Arena: Reliant Arena

Results
- Record: 17–17 (.500)
- Place: 5th (Western)
- Playoff finish: Did not qualify

The 2008 WNBA season was the 12th and final season before hiatus for the Houston Comets. The Comets were not able to return to the postseason for the first time since 2006. By season's end, Comets owner Hilton Koch put the franchise up for sale less than two years after he bought it.

Comets won't return until the 2027 WNBA season, when the Connecticut Sun sold to Rockets owner Tilman Fertitta become the "revived" Houston Comets.

== Offseason ==
=== Expansion draft ===
- Roneeka Hodges was selected in the 2008 Expansion Draft for the Atlanta Dream, and subsequently traded her to the Seattle Storm, along with the No. 4 pick in the 2008 WNBA draft for Iziane Castro Marques and the No. 8 overall pick.

=== WNBA draft ===
Pick	Player	Nationality	School/Club team
5	Matee Ajavon	United States	Rutgers
17	Erica White	United States	LSU
31	Crystal Kelly	United States	Western Kentucky

== Transactions ==
- February 20: Signed free agent Mwadi Mabika.
- February 25: Re-signed free agent Tamecka Dixon.
- February 27: Signed Erin Grant to a training camp contract.
- March 6: Re-signed Barbara Turner, then traded her to the Connecticut Sun for Megan Mahoney.
- March 7: Signed free agent Shannon Johnson.
- March 28: Re-signed free agent Michelle Snow.
- March 31: Re-signed free agent Tina Thompson.
- April 10: Signed Debbie Remmerde to a training camp contract.
- April 14: Signed Tamara Ransburg and Marcedes Walker to training camp contracts.
- April 15: Waived Anastasia Kostaki.
- April 16: Signed Sequoia Holmes to a training camp contract.
- April 19: Waived Tamara Ransburg.
- April 24: Waived Debbie Remmerde.
- April 29: Waived Erin Grant, Megan Mahoney, Erin Myrick and Crystal Smith.
- May 15: Waived Crystal Kelly.
- May 16: Waived Latasha Byears.
- June 15: Waived Marcedes Walker.
- June 25: Re-signed Latasha Byears.
- June 27: Waived Ashley Shields.
- July 5: Signed Roneeka Hodges to a seven-day contract.
- July 16: Signed Roneeka Hodges for the remainder of the season.

== Preseason ==
Game	Date	Opponent	Result	Record
1	May 1	San Antonio	W 74–68	1–0
2	May 9	Connecticut	L 80–88	1–1
3	May 13	Washington	L 66–72	1–2

== Regular season ==
In a game against the Detroit Shock on July 24, Shock player Nancy Lieberman broke her own record for being the oldest player in the WNBA. Lieberman, a Hall of Famer since 1999, was 39 years old when she played with Phoenix during the league's first year in 1997.

Nancy Lieberman played nine minutes and had two assists. One of the assists included a no-look pass in the closing minutes of the Detroit Shock's 79–61 loss to the Houston Comets on July 24.

=== Season standings ===
Western Conference	W	L	PCT	GB	Home	Road	Conf.
San Antonio Silver Stars ^{x}	24	10	.706	–	15–2	9–8	10–10
Seattle Storm ^{x}	22	12	.647	2.0	16–1	6–11	13–7
Los Angeles Sparks ^{x}	20	14	.588	4.0	12–5	8–9	12–8
Sacramento Monarchs ^{x}	18	16	.529	6.0	5–12	13–4	9–11
Houston Comets ^{o}	17	17	.500	7.0	13–4	4–13	10–10
Minnesota Lynx ^{o}	16	18	.471	8.0	10–7	6–11	8–12
Phoenix Mercury ^{o}	16	18	.471	8.0	9–8	7–10	8–12

=== Season schedule ===
Date	Opponent	Score	Result	Record
May 17	@ Detroit	66-85	Loss	0-1
May 25	@ Washington	66-69	Loss	0-2
May 27	vs. Minnesota	92-98 (OT)	Loss	0-3
May 30	@ Sacramento	66-73	Loss	0-4
June 1	@ Seattle	63-64	Loss	0-5
June 3	vs. San Antonio	75-72	Win	1-5
June 6	@ New York	73-81	Loss	1-6
June 7	@ Indiana	75-84	Loss	1-7
June 14	vs. Seattle	68-60	Win	2-7
June 16	vs. Atlanta	88-79	Win	3-7
June 18	vs. Washington	63-67	Loss	3-8
June 21	@ Minnesota	72-65	Win	4-8
June 24	@ San Antonio	82-81(OT)	Win	5-8
June 26	vs. San Antonio	77-71	Win	6-8
June 28	vs. Indiana	75-61	Win	7-8
July 1	@ Connecticut	68-78	Loss	7-9
July 3	@ Atlanta	72-65	Win	8-9
July 5	vs. Sacramento	73-65	Win	9-9
July 8	@ Phoenix	94-99	Loss	9-10
July 9	@ Los Angeles	74-82(OT)	Loss	9-11
July 12	@ Minnesota	71-85	Loss	9-12
July 17	vs. Minnesota	96-88	Win	10-12
July 19	vs. Los Angeles	75-72(OT)	Win	11-12
July 22	vs. Phoenix	94-92	Win	12-12
July 24	vs. Detroit	79-61	Win	13-12
July 26	vs. Chicago	79-65	Win	14-12
August 28	@ Seattle	49-66	Loss	14-13
August 30	@ Sacramento	65-80	Loss	14-14
September 2	vs. New York	87-90(OT)	Loss	14-15
September 6	vs. Los Angeles	66-84	Loss	14-16
September 7	@ Phoenix	74-99	Loss	14-17
September 9	vs. Connecticut	75-68	Win	15-17
September 14	@ Chicago	79-76	Win	16-17
September 15	vs. Sacramento	90-81	Win	17-17

- The September 12th game against Sacramento Monarchs was postponed due to Hurricane Ike.

== Player stats ==
Legend
GP	Games played	GS	Games started	MPG	Minutes per game
FG%	Field-goal percentage	3P%	3-point field-goal percentage	FT%	Free-throw percentage
RPG	Rebounds per game	APG	Assists per game	SPG	Steals per game
BPG	Blocks per game	PPG	Points per game

=== Regular season ===
Player	GP	GS	MPG	FG%	3P%	FT%	RPG	APG	SPG	BPG	PPG
Tina Thompson	30	29	35.8	.412	.403	.859	6.9	2.1	1.1	0.7	18.1
Michelle Snow	34	34	25.2	.529	.500	.697	6.8	1.3	0.5	0.9	9.9
Tamecka Dixon	24	20	26.4	.403	.154	.857	3.2	1.8	1.0	0.1	9.0
Sancho Lyttle	27	9	18.1	.582	.000	.745	6.2	0.9	1.5	1.0	8.2
Matee Ajavon	34	2	17.8	.331	.191	.791	1.8	1.7	0.9	0.2	8.0
Hamchétou Maïga-Ba	26	22	22.7	.492	.500	.692	3.3	1.5	1.3	0.3	7.8
Shannon Johnson	33	32	30.7	.379	.320	.747	3.2	5.1	1.6	0.3	7.7
Roneeka Hodges	15	6	18.3	.418	.366	1.000	2.0	1.3	0.3	0.1	7.3
Mwadi Mabika	20	11	16.4	.303	.274	.714	1.9	0.9	0.5	0.0	4.6
Mistie Williams	32	0	11.4	.505	.000	.549	2.4	0.6	0.4	0.3	3.8
Erica White	34	2	12.5	.284	.143	.897	1.4	1.4	0.7	0.1	3.6
Sequoia Holmes	17	3	11.9	.258	.235	.727	2.1	0.6	0.5	0.1	3.1
Latasha Byears	11	0	4.2	.471	.000	.667	1.1	0.1	0.3	0.0	1.6
Ashley Shields	3	0	4.0	.000	.000	.500	0.0	0.3	0.3	0.0	0.7
Marcedes Walker	2	0	5.5	.000	.000	.000	3.5	0.5	0.0	0.5	0.0

== Roster ==
2008 Houston Comets roster
Players
Coaches

Pos.	No.	Nat.	Name	Height	Weight	From
G	1	(United States)	Ajavon, Matee	5' 10" (1.78m)	160 lb (73kg)	Rutgers
G/F	00	(United States)	Byears, Latasha	5' 11" (1.8m)	206 lb (93kg)	DePaul
G	20	(United States)	Dixon, Tamecka	5' 9" (1.75m)	148 lb (67kg)	Kansas
G	15	(United States)	Hodges, Roneeka	5' 11" (1.8m)	165 lb (75kg)	Florida State
G/F	17	(United States)	Holmes, Sequoia	6' 1" (1.85m)	155 lb (70kg)	UNLV
G	41	(United States)	Johnson, Shannon	5' 7" (1.7m)	152 lb (69kg)	South Carolina
F	21	(United States)	Lyttle, Sancho	6' 4" (1.93m)	175 lb (79kg)	Houston
G	4	(Democratic Republic of the Congo)	Mabika, Mwadi	5' 11" (1.8m)	165 lb (75kg)	Democratic Republic of the Congo
G/F	99	(Mali)	Maïga-Ba, Hamchétou	6' 1" (1.85m)	160 lb (73kg)	Old Dominion
C	2	(United States)	Snow, Michelle	6' 5" (1.96m)	158 lb (72kg)	Tennessee
F	7	(United States)	Thompson, Tina	6' 2" (1.88m)	178 lb (81kg)	USC
G	5	(United States)	White, Erica	5' 3" (1.6m)	135 lb (61kg)	LSU
F	8	(United States)	Williams, Mistie	6' 3" (1.91m)	184 lb (83kg)	Duke

Head coach
(United States) Karleen Thompson (USC)
Assistant coaches
(United States) Ryan Weisenberg (Cal Poly)
(United States) Laurie Byrd (Eastern Michigan)
Athletic trainer
(United States) Courtney Watson
Strength and conditioning coach
(United States) Virgil Campbell

Legend

- (C) Team captain
- (DP) Unsigned draft pick
- (FA) Free agent
- (S) Suspended
- Injured

WNBA roster page

== Awards and honors ==
- Matee Ajavon, Guard, All-WNBA Rookie Team

== Final Days ==
On December 1, 2008, the WNBA announced a plan to fold the team, which resulted in the loss of 37 jobs. A dispersal draft took place on December 8, 2008. Before the team folded, they were possibly going to move to Las Vegas, Nevada, but the plan didn't work out.

What turned out to be the team's final home game in its history was relocated from the Reliant Arena to the Strahan Coliseum on the campus of Texas State due to Hurricane Ike. The game was played on September 15, 2008 as the Comets defeated the Sacramento Monarchs 90–81.
