= Wisconsin Badgers women's basketball =

2025–26 Wisconsin Badgers women's basketball team
- University: University of Wisconsin–Madison
- Head coach: Robin Pingeton (1st season)
- Location: Madison, Wisconsin
- Arena: Kohl Center (capacity: 17,230)
- Conference: Big Ten
- Nickname: Badgers
- Colors: Cardinal and white
- Student section: Area Red
- All-time record: 628-738

NCAA Division I tournament second round
- 1995, 1996

NCAA Division I tournament appearances
- 1992, 1995, 1996, 1998, 2001, 2002, 2010

AIAW tournament quarterfinals
- 1982
Other AIAW tournament results
Appearances	1982

Uniforms
Home	Away

The Wisconsin Badgers women's basketball team is an NCAA Division I college basketball team competing in the Big Ten Conference. Home games are played at the Kohl Center, located on the University of Wisconsin–Madison campus in Madison, Wisconsin. Previous to the Kohl Center, the home games were played at the Wisconsin Field House.

== Coaching history ==
=== Marilyn Harris era (1974–1976) ===
Harris was the first coach of the women's basketball team at UW. She led the Lady Badgers to a 16–20 record in two seasons.

=== Edwina Qualls era (1976–1986) ===
Qualls led the Badgers for 10 years and the start of the Big Ten Conference in 1982. In the 1982–1983 season, the Badgers had recorded their best season thus far: 19–8. Qualls finished with a record of 131–141.

=== Mary Murphy era (1986–1994) ===
Murphy led the Badgers to an 87–135 record over eight years. She was the Big Ten Conference Coach of the Year in 1992 with an overall record of 20–9 and a Big Ten record of 13–5. In 1992, Murphy led the Badgers to their first appearance in the NCAA tournament.

=== Jane Albright era (1994–2003) ===
Albright led the Badgers for nine years and earned a record of 161–107. During her tenure, she led the Badgers to five NCAA tournament appearances, and two WNIT appearances. The Badgers were WNIT runners-up in 1999 and WNIT champions in 2000. Albright was the Big Ten Conference Coach of the Year in 1995.

=== Lisa Stone era (2003–2011) ===
Lisa Stone led the Badgers to a 128–118 (.520) record in eight seasons, with a Big Ten Conference record of 56–79 (.415). The 2006–2007 season produced a record 23 wins (23–13) before the team fell in the WNIT championship to the University of Wyoming, 72–56. The 2007–2008 season produced another trip to the WNIT, but the Badgers fell in the second round to Villanova University. The 2008–2009 season was the third consecutive year the Badgers went to the WNIT, making it to the third round before falling to St. Bonaventure.

The 2009–2010 season produced a 21–11 record as Stone took the Badgers to the NCAA tournament for the first time where they lost in the first round to Vermont, 64–55. In Stone's final year (2010–2011) the Badgers finished 16–15, with another 10-win record in the Big Ten Conference (10–6) and another trip to the WNIT, where they bowed out in the second round to Illinois State 62–59.

Assistant coach was Tasha McDowell.

=== Bobbie Kelsey era (2011–2016) ===
On April 11, 2011, Bobbie Kelsey became the new head coach for the Badgers, signing a five-year contract. Her first season ended with a Big Ten tournament loss to Minnesota as the Badgers finished with a 9–20 overall record, finishing 5–11 in Big Ten play. Kelsey's second season ended with a 12–19 overall record, 3–13 in Big Ten play. The Badgers recorded their first Big Ten tournament win for Kelsey by beating Illinois 58–57 before bowing out of the tournament with a 74–62 loss to Purdue. The third season in the Kelsey era came to a close with a loss to Minnesota in the B1G tournament. The Badgers finished with an overall record of 10–19, with a 3–13 conference record. Taylor Wurtz and Morgan Paige became the 22nd and 23rd players to reach the 1,000 point plateau. At the end of the 2013–2014 Kelsey's contract was extended three years, ending in the spring of 2019. The 2014–15 season ended with an 11th-place finish in the conference and a 9–20 record. Kelsey's fifth year as head coach ended with a 7-22 overall record and a 13th-place finish in the conference. Kelsey was let go on March 4, 2016, after finishing with an all-time record of 47–100.

=== Jonathan Tsipis era (2016–2021) ===
On March 31, 2016, Jonathan Tsipis was named the head coach and first male coach of the Badgers women's basketball team. He previously was the head coach at George Washington University. He was relieved of his duties on March 9, 2021, following a 67–42 loss to Illinois in the first round of the Big Ten Women's Basketball Tournament. He finished with a 50-99 overall record in his 5 seasons.

=== Marisa Moseley era (2021–2025) ===
Former Boston University head coach Marisa Moseley was chosen as the new head coach on March 25, 2021.

=== Robin Pingeton era (2025–present) ===
Robin Pingeton was named the new head coach on March 25, 2025.

== Coaching staff ==
- Head Coach: Robin Pingeton
- Associate Head Coach: Chris Bracey
- Assistant Coach: McGhee Mann
- Assistant Coach: Ariel Massengale
- Assistant Coach: Evan Johnson
- Assistant Coach: Julia Ford

== Roster ==
2024–25 Wisconsin Badgers women's basketball team
Players
Coaches

Pos.	#	Name	Height	Year	Previous school	Hometown
PG	0	Nikki Kerstein	5 ft 8 in (1.73 m)	So	Montini Catholic	Riverwoods, IL
G	2	Giselle Janowski	5 ft 9 in (1.75 m)	Fr	Pewaukee, WI	Pewaukee, WI
G	3	Addie Deal	6 ft 0 in (1.83 m)	So	Mater Dei High School	Irvine, CA
C	6	Dorja Zaja	6 ft 3 in (1.91 m)	So	Privatna Gimnazija Marul Zagreb	Zagreb, Croatia
G	7	Teagan Mallegni	6 ft 1 in (1.85 m)	Jr	McFarland, WI	McFarland, WI
G	9	Alba Martín Mesa	5 ft 6 in (1.68 m)	Jr	ÍES Pérez Galdós	Las Palmas de Gran Canaria, Spain
G	10	Adaline Sheplee	6 ft 3 in (1.91 m)	Fr	Rice Lake	Rice Lake, WI
G	11	Caia Rose	5 ft 3 in (1.6 m)	Sr	Mater Dei High School	Whittier, CA
F	13	Kadidia Toure	6 ft 3 in (1.91 m)		Silver Spring, MD	Silver Spring, MD
G	14	Leah Nordin	6 ft 3 in (1.91 m)	Fr	Shawano, WI	Shawano, WI
G	20	Kyrah Daniels	6 ft 0 in (1.83 m)	Sr	Thunder Ridge	Highlands Ranch, CO
G	22	Shay Bollin	6 ft 3 in (1.91 m)		Bridgewater-Raynham Regional	Raynham, MA
G	24	Laci Steele	5 ft 11 in (1.8 m)	Sr	Edmond, OK	Edmond, OK
G	71	Alicia Courthiau (W)	5 ft 10 in (1.78 m)	Fr	Brussels, Belgium
		[[ ]]	—	—

Head coach

- Robin Pingeton (St. Ambrose)

Assistant coach(es)

Legend

- (C) Team captain
- (S) Suspended
- (I) Ineligible
- (W) Walk-on
- Injured
- Current redshirt

Roster

== Year by year results ==
Conference tournament winners noted with # Source

Season	Team	Overall	Conference	Standing	Postseason	Coaches' poll	AP poll
Marilyn Harris (Independent) (1974–1976)
1974-75	Marilyn Harris	11–7	–				
1975-76	Marilyn Harris	5–13	–				
Marilyn Harris:		16–20	–				
Edwina Qualls (Independent, Big Ten) (1976–1986)
1976-77	Edwina Qualls	7–14	–		WWIAC		
1977-78	Edwina Qualls	14–10	–		MAIAW		
1978-79	Edwina Qualls	13–11	–		WWIAC		
1979-80	Edwina Qualls	10–16	–		MAIAW		
1980-81	Edwina Qualls	13–18	–				
Big Ten Conference
1981-82	Edwina Qualls	21–13	1–1	T-4th	AIAW Quarterfinals		
1982-83	Edwina Qualls	19–8	11–7	5th			
1983-84	Edwina Qualls	18–10	13–5	2nd			
1984-85	Edwina Qualls	11–17	6–12	T-7th			
1985-86	Edwina Qualls	4–24	1–17	10th			
Edwina Qualls:		130–141	32–42				
Mary Murphy (Big Ten) (1986–1994)
1986-87	Mary Murphy	9–19	4–14	T-8th			
1987-88	Mary Murphy	4–24	2–16	10th			
1988-89	Mary Murphy	13–14	5–13	8th			
1989-90	Mary Murphy	8–20	3–15	T-9th			
1990-91	Mary Murphy	13–15	7–11	7th			
1991-92	Mary Murphy	20–9	13–5	3rd	NCAA First Round		
1992-93	Mary Murphy	7–20	4–14	10th			
1993-94	Mary Murphy	13–14	6–12	9th			
Mary Murphy:		87–135	44–100				
Jane Albright (Big Ten) (1994–2003)
1994-95	Jane Albright	20–9	11–5	3rd	NCAA Second Round		
1995-96	Jane Albright	21–8	12–4	3rd	NCAA Second Round	20	18
1996-97	Jane Albright	16–11	8–8	T-6th			
1997-98	Jane Albright	21–10	9–7	6th	NCAA First Round		
1998-99	Jane Albright	18–14	9–7	T-4th	WNIT Finals		
1999-2000	Jane Albright	21–12	8–8	T-5th	WNIT Champions		
2000-01	Jane Albright	18–10	12–4	T-2nd	NCAA First Round		24
2001-02	Jane Albright	19–12	8–8	T-5th	NCAA First Round		
2002-03	Jane Albright	7–21	5–11	T-8th			
Jane Albright:		161–107	82–62				
Lisa Stone (Big Ten) (2003–2011)
2003-04	Lisa Stone	10–17	4–12	T-8th			
2004-05	Lisa Stone	12–16	5–11	8th			
2005-06	Lisa Stone	11–18	5–11	9th			
2006-07	Lisa Stone	23–13	7–9	T-5th	WNIT Finals		
2007-08	Lisa Stone	16–14	9–9	T-7th	WNIT First Round (Bye)		
2008-09	Lisa Stone	19–15	6–12	T-7th	WNIT Sixteen		
2009-10	Lisa Stone	21–11	10–8	T-3rd	NCAA First Round		
2010-11	Lisa Stone	16–15	10–6	T-3rd	WNIT Second Round		
Lisa Stone:		128–119	56–78				
Bobbie Kelsey (Big Ten) (2011–2016)
2011-12	Bobbie Kelsey	9–20	5–11	T-9th			
2012-13	Bobbie Kelsey	12–19	3–13	11th			
2013-14	Bobbie Kelsey	10–19	3–13	11th			
2014-15	Bobbie Kelsey	9–20	5–13	11th			
2015-16	Bobbie Kelsey	7–22	3–15	13th			
Bobbie Kelsey:		47–100	19–65				
Jonathan Tsipis (Big Ten) (2016–2021)
2016-17	Jonathan Tsipis	9–22	3–13	T-12th			
2017-18	Jonathan Tsipis	9–21	2–14	13th			
2018-19	Jonathan Tsipis	15–18	4–14	13th			
2019-20	Jonathan Tsipis	12–19	3–15	12th			
2020-21	Jonathan Tsipis	5–19	2–18	T-13th			
Jonathan Tsipis:		50-99	14-74				
Marisa Moseley (Big Ten) (2021–2025)
2021-22	Marisa Moseley	8–21	5–13	T-11th			
2022-23	Marisa Moseley	11–19	6–12	10th			
2023-24	Marisa Moseley	15–17	6–12	10th	WNIT Great 8		
2024-25	Marisa Moseley	14-17	4–14	14th			
Marisa Moseley:		48-64	21-51				
Total:		665-786					
National champion Postseason invitational champion Conference regular season champion Conference regular season and conference tournament champion Division regular season champion Division regular season and conference tournament champion Conference tournament champion

== Postseason results ==
=== NCAA Division I ===
Year	Seed	Coach	Round	Opponent	Result	Location
1992	#6	Mary Murphy	First Round	#11 Montana	L 74-85	UW Field House
1995	#10	Jane Albright	First Round; Second Round	#7 Kansas #2 Texas Tech	W 73-72; L 65-88	Lubbock, TX
1996	#6	Jane Albright	First Round; Second Round	#11 Oregon #3 Vanderbilt	W 74-60; L 82-96	Nashville, TN
1998	#6	Jane Albright	First Round	#11 Virginia Tech	L 64-75	Gainesville, FL
2001	#7	Jane Albright	First Round	#10 Missouri	L 68-71	Athens, GA
2002	#8	Jane Albright	First Round	#9 Arizona State	L 70-73	Nashville, TN
2010	#7	Lisa Stone	First Round	#10 Vermont	L 55-64	South Bend, IN

=== AIAW Division I ===
The Badgers made one appearance in the AIAW National Division I basketball tournament, with a combined record of 1–1.

Year	Round	Opponent	Result
1982	First Round; Quarterfinals	Colorado; Texas	W, 60–59; L, 61–73

== All-time statistical leaders ==
=== Career points leaders (1,000 points or more) ===
	Total points	Name	Career games	Position	Years played	Scored 1,500th point	Date and opponent
1	2,312	Jolene Anderson	123 games	G	2004–2008	Jr./85th game	2/17/07 vs. Purdue
2	1,994	Barb Franke	114 games	F/C	1991–1996	Sr./90th game	12/7/95 vs. Western Illinois
3	1,915	Jessie Stomski	123 games	F	1998–2002	Sr./100th game	12/11/01 vs. UW–Milwaukee
4	1,901	Robin Threatt	114 games	G	1988–1993	Sr./92nd game	12/15/92 vs. UW–Milwaukee
5	1,879	Theresa Huff	118 games	F/C	1979–1983	Sr./97th game	12/22/82 vs. Loyola-Chicago
6	1,857	LaTonya Sims	124 games	F/G	1997–2001	Sr./99th game	11/22/00 vs. Notre Dame
7	1,662	Tamara Moore	124 games	G	1998–2002	Sr./114th game	1/30/02 vs. Iowa
8	1,576	Katie Voigt	116 games	G	1993–1998	Sr./112th game	2/20/98 vs. Illinois
9	1,543	Ann Klapperich	113 games	F	1994–1998	Sr./110th game	2/22/98 vs. Penn State
10	1,512	Janese Banks	118 games	G	2004–2008	Sr./116th game	3/2/08 vs. Iowa
11	1,482	Lisa Bonnell	109 games	F	1984–1988	N/A	N/A
12	1,476	Alyssa Karel	124 games	G	2007-2011	N/A	N/A
13	1,455	Janet Huff	118 games	G	1980–1984	N/A	N/A
14	1,427	Michelle Kozelka	111 games	F	1988–1992	N/A	N/A
15	1,399	Chris Pruitt	115 games	G	1981–1985	N/A	N/A
16	1,367	Taylor Wurtz	126 games	F/G	2009–2014	N/A	N/A
17	1,279	Keisha Anderson	85 games	G	1994–1997	N/A	N/A
18	1,230	Morgan Paige	118 games	G	2010–2014	N/A	N/A
19	1,224	Nicole Bauman	113 games	G	2012–2016	N/A	N/A
20	1,198	Imani Lewis	87 games	F	2018–2021	N/A	N/A
21	1,180	Julia Pospislova	112 games	G	2019-2023	N/A	N/A
22	1,123	Kelly Paulus	119 games	F	1996–2000	N/A	N/A
23	1,121	Marsha Howard	109 games	F	2015-2019	N/A	N/A
24	1,120	Faith Johnson	118 games	G	1980–1985	N/A	N/A
25	1,074	Cayla McMorris	115 games	G	2014-2018	N/A	N/A
26	1,053	Lin Zastrow	122 games	F	2007–2011	N/A	N/A
27	1,037	Linda Gough	104 games	F	1977–1981	N/A	N/A
28	1,008	Mynette Clark	95 games	G	1988–1992	N/A	N/A

=== Career rebounding leaders ===
	Name	Rebounds	Years played
1	Theresa Huff	1,201	1979–1983
2	Jessie Stomski	959	1998–2002
3	Michele Kozelka	916	1988–1992
4	LaTonya Sims	882	1997–2001
5	Barb Franke	881	1991–1996
6	Jolene Anderson	848	2004–2008
7	Taylor Wurtz	793	2009-2014
8	Serah Williams	777	2022-2025
9	Lisa Bonnell	760	1984-1988
10	Michelle Lowman	719	1978-1983

=== Career assists leaders ===
	Name	Assists	Years played
1	Tamara Moore	554	1998–2002
2	Rae Lin D'Alie	483	2006–2010
3	Keisha Anderson	471	1994–1997
4	Kendra Van Leeuwen	442	2016–2019
5	Janet Huff	412	1980–1984
6	Jolene Anderson	409	2004–2008
7	Stephanie Rich	383	2001-2005
8	Katie Voigt	373	1993–1998
9	Amy Bauer	370	1988–1991
10	Chris Pruitt	367	1981–1985

=== Career steals leaders ===
	Name	Steals	Years played
1	Tamara Moore	353	1998–2002
2	Keisha Anderson	327	1994–1997
3	Janet Huff	294	1980–1984
4	Robin Threatt	283	1998-1993
5	Faith Johnson	260	1980–1985
6	Jolene Anderson	242	2004–2008
7	Theresa Huff	241	1979–1983
8	Chris Pruitt	217	1981–1985
9	Rae Lin D'Alie	213	2006–2010
10	Stephanie Rich	209	2001-2005

=== Career blocks leaders ===
	Name	Blocks	Years played
1	Michelle Lowman	253	1978–1983
2	Serah Williams	206	2022-2025
3	Cassie Rochel	181	2010-2015
4	Danielle Ward	156	2004–2008
5	Abby Laszewski	131	2016-2019
6	Janetta Johnson	130	1988–1989
7	Emily Ashbaugh	113	2000–2004
8	Lello Gebisa	110	2002–2004
9	Inga Young	109	1984–1987
10	Lin Zastrow	108	2007–2011

== Badgers in the pros ==
Name	UW years	Country (team)	Years played
Jolene Anderson	2004–2008	WNBA Connecticut Sun	2008
		France, Poland, Turkey, Italy	2009–present
Keisha Anderson	1994-97	ABL: Colorado Xplosion	1998-99
		WNBA: Atlanta, Washington, Charlotte, Chicago	2000-07
Emily Ashbaugh	2000-04	Germany	2005-06
Nicole Bauman	2012-16	Sweden	2016-17
Anya Covington	2009-12	Germany	2013-14
Rae Lin D'Alie	2006-10	Italy	2011-present
Barb Franke	1991-96	France, ABL: Chicago	1997-99
Lello Gebisa	2002-04	Greece	2004-05
Marsha Howard	2015-19	Luxembourg	2019-Present
Theresa Huff	1979-83	Spain	1983-84
Michala Johnson	2013-16	Belgium, WBC: St. Louis	2016-18
Ashley Josephson	2002-06	Spain	2007-08
Alyssa Karel	2007-11	Germany	2012-14
Ann Klapperich	1994-98	Portugal	1998-99
Michelle Lowman	1978-83	Sweden	1983-84
Cayla McMorris	2014-18	Turkey, Sweden	2018-19
Tamara Moore	1998-02	WNBA: Miami, Minnesota, Phoenix, Los Angeles	2002-06
DeeDee Pate	1996-2000	Germany	2000-01
Cassie Rochel	2010-14	Romania, Hungaria, Australia, Greece	2014-19
Jessie Stomski	1998-02	Iceland, Greece, France	2002-05
Robin Threatt	1988-93	WNBA: Seattle	2000
Katie Voigt	1993-98	Belgium, Israel	1998-01
Jordan Wilson	2002–06	Spain, Austria, Luxembourg	2006–2010
Dakota Whyte	2012-16	Sweden, Greece	2016-18
Taylor Wurtz	2009-13	Sweden, France	2015-Present
Avyanna Young	2015-17	Finland	2017-18
