= Dee Davis =

American basketball player (born 1984)

Personal information
- Born: November 8, 1984 (age 41) Cincinnati, Ohio, U.S.
- Listed height: 5 ft 7 in (1.70 m)
- Listed weight: 138 lb (63 kg)

Career information
- High school: Princeton (Sharonville, Ohio)
- College: Vanderbilt (2003–2007)
- WNBA draft: 2007: 2nd round, 14th overall pick
- Drafted by: Houston Comets
- Position: Point guard

Career history
- 2007: Houston Comets

Career highlights
- First-team All-SEC – Coaches (2006); 2× Second-team All-SEC (2005, 2006); McDonald's All-American (2003)
- Stats at Basketball Reference

Deonna "Dee" Davis (born November 8, 1984) is an American former professional basketball player.

== Early life ==
Born in Cincinnati, Ohio, Davis played for Princeton High School in Sharonville, Ohio, where she was named a WBCA All-American. She participated in the 2003 WBCA High School All-America Game.

== Professional career ==
Davis was selected by the Houston Comets with the fourteenth pick of The 2007 WNBA draft but was released in six games of the 2007 season averaging 2.0 points per game.

== Career statistics ==
Legend
GP	Games played	GS	Games started	MPG	Minutes per game	RPG	Rebounds per game
APG	Assists per game	SPG	Steals per game	BPG	Blocks per game	PPG	Points per game
TO	Turnovers per game	FG%	Field-goal percentage	3P%	3-point field-goal percentage	FT%	Free-throw percentage
**Bold**	Career best	°	League leader

=== WNBA career statistics ===
==== Regular season ====
Year	Team	GP	GS	MPG	FG%	3P%	FT%	RPG	APG	SPG	BPG	TO	PPG
2007	Houston	3	0	6.3	33.3	66.7	0.0	0.0	0.0	0.0	0.0	1.7	2.0
Career	1 year, 1 team	3	0	6.3	33.3	66.7	0.0	0.0	0.0	0.0	0.0	1.7	2.0

=== College career statistics ===
Legend
GP	Games played	GS	Games started	MPG	Minutes per game
FG%	Field goal percentage	3P%	3-point field goal percentage	FT%	Free throw percentage
RPG	Rebounds per game	APG	Assists per game	SPG	Steals per game
BPG	Blocks per game	PPG	Points per game	**Bold**	Career high

Year	Team	GP	Points	FG%	3P%	FT%	RPG	APG	SPG	BPG	PPG
2003–04	Vanderbilt	29	159	37.4	22.2	77.0	2.6	4.7	1.5	–	5.5
2004–05	Vanderbilt	32	**427**	**43.7**	**36.0**	81.3	**3.5**	6.0	1.9	0.1	**13.3**
2005–06	Vanderbilt	31	242	36.4	13.6	**81.6**	3.1	**6.8**	2.1	0.1	7.8
2006–07	Vanderbilt	**34**	264	39.1	34.6	80.4	2.9	5.6	2.1	–	7.8
Career	Vanderbilt	126	1092	39.8	29.4	80.4	3.0	5.8	1.9	0.0	8.7
