= Tamara Moore =

American basketball player and coach (born 1980)

Dallas Mavericks
- Title: Scout
- League: NBA

Personal information
- Born: April 11, 1980 (age 46) Minneapolis, Minnesota, U.S.
- Listed height: 5 ft 10 in (1.78 m)

Career information
- High school: North (Minneapolis, Minnesota)
- College: Wisconsin (1998–2002)
- WNBA draft: 2002: 1st round, 15th overall pick
- Drafted by: Miami Sol
- Playing career: 2002–2007
- Position: Guard

Career history

Playing
- 2002: Miami Sol
- 2002: Minnesota Lynx
- 2003: Detroit Shock
- 2003–2004: Phoenix Mercury
- 2005: New York Liberty
- 2006: Los Angeles Sparks
- 2007: Houston Comets
- ?–?: Hapoel Haifa/ Motzkin
- ?–?: Maccabi Ramat Hen
- ?–?: Saint-Amand Hainaut
- ?–?: Maccabi Bnot Ashdod
- ?–?: Elitzur Ramla

Coaching
- 2020–2024: Mesabi Range College
- 2022: Boston Celtics (summer league assistant)

Career highlights
- Big Ten Defensive Player of the Year (2001); 2× First-team All-Big Ten (2001, 2002); Minnesota Miss Basketball (1998)
- Stats at WNBA.com
- Stats at Basketball Reference

Tamara Tenell Moore (born April 11, 1980, in Minneapolis, Minnesota) is the current men's basketball head coach at Mesabi Range College in Virginia, Minnesota and an assistant coach for the Boston Celtics 2022 Summer League team. Moore was a professional basketball player who competed in the WNBA and Europe, and is the only female head coach of a collegiate men's basketball team.

== Prep career ==
Moore played for Minneapolis North High School in Minneapolis, Minnesota, where she was named a 1998 WBCA All-American. She participated in the WBCA High School All-America Game where she scored thirteen points. Graduating from Minneapolis North in 1998, Moore guided the Lady Polars to a state championship and was named Minnesota Miss Basketball.

== College career ==
Moore attended college at University of Wisconsin–Madison and graduated in 2002. She was named the Big Ten Defensive Player of the Year in 2001. Moore ended her Badgers career playing every game over four years, including two WNIT and two NCAA Tournaments. She finished as the school all-time leader in steals and assists. Following her collegiate career, she was selected 15th overall in the 2002 WNBA draft by the Miami Sol. She was inducted into the Wisconsin Athletic Hall of Fame in 2017

== Coaching career ==
Moore has coached high school girls basketball in Minneapolis. Moore became the second female head coach of a men's team after Kerri-Ann McTiernan coached Kingsborough Community College in the 1990s. She became the 1st African-American female to accomplish the title.

In 2014-2015 she was involved with the short-lived Minnesota Flame semi-pro club. In April 2020, she was hired as the men's basketball and softball coach at Mesabi Range College.

On July 1, 2022, Moore announced via Twitter that she would be an assistant coach for the Boston Celtics 2022 Summer League season.

== WNBA career statistics ==
Legend
GP	Games played	GS	Games started	MPG	Minutes per game	RPG	Rebounds per game
APG	Assists per game	SPG	Steals per game	BPG	Blocks per game	PPG	Points per game
TO	Turnovers per game	FG%	Field-goal percentage	3P%	3-point field-goal percentage	FT%	Free-throw percentage
**Bold**	Career best	°	League leader

=== Regular season ===
Year	Team	GP	GS	MPG	FG%	3P%	FT%	RPG	APG	SPG	BPG	TO	PPG
2002	Miami	5	3	16.6	.320	.222	**1.000**	1.4	2.0	**1.4**	0.0	2.2	5.6
2002	Minnesota	26	20	**25.1**	.366	**.382**	.830	**2.9**	**3.0**	0.9	0.3	2.8	**7.5**
2003	Detroit	15	0	4.4	.500	.000	.833	0.6	0.3	0.3	0.1	0.4	1.4
2003	Phoenix	11	0	10.0	.423	.000	.846	1.7	0.7	0.5	**0.4**	0.9	3.0
2004	Phoenix	32	0	12.1	.443	.300	.862	0.9	1.7	0.8	0.3	1.1	2.6
2005	New York	7	0	6.9	**.667**	.333	**1.000**	1.0	0.9	0.0	0.0	0.6	1.6
2006	Los Angeles	**34**	**33**	18.7	.469	.347	.803	2.1	1.9	1.0	0.2	1.1	6.1
2007	Houston	15	9	19.3	.368	.267	**1.000**	1.7	2.9	1.1	0.1	2.1	3.9
Career	6 years, 7 teams	89	89	33.4	.478	.329	.826	7.0	2.9	1.6	1.1	2.2	14.6

=== Playoffs ===
Year	Team	GP	GS	MPG	FG%	3P%	FT%	RPG	APG	SPG	BPG	TO	PPG
2006	Los Angeles	4	4	21.8	.526	.667	.636	3.0	2.8	0.8	0.3	2.0	7.8
Career	1 year, 1 team	4	4	21.8	.526	.667	.636	3.0	2.8	0.8	0.3	2.0	7.8

== Career statistics ==
Legend
GP	Games played	GS	Games started	MPG	Minutes per game
FG%	Field goal percentage	3P%	3-point field goal percentage	FT%	Free throw percentage
RPG	Rebounds per game	APG	Assists per game	SPG	Steals per game
BPG	Blocks per game	PPG	Points per game	**Bold**	Career high

=== College ===
Year	Team	GP	Points	FG%	3P%	FT%	RPG	APG	SPG	BPG	PPG
1998–99	Wisconsin	32	347	.443	.339	.811	4.9	3.3	2.5	0.3	10.8
1999–00	Wisconsin	**33**	445	.462	.348	.770	5.1	3.3	2.5	0.7	13.5
2000–01	Wisconsin	28	354	.450	.339	.730	4.6	5.4	**3.6**	0.7	12.6
2001–02	Wisconsin	31	**516**	.492	**.363**	**.833**	**5.1**	**6.1**	2.9	**0.8**	**16.6**
Career		124	1,662	.464	.351	.783	4.9	4.5	2.8	0.6	13.4
