= Minnesota Flame =

Semi-professional basketball club, 2014-2015

- Founded: 2014
- League: World All-Star Basketball League
- Team history: Minnesota Flame (2014-2015)
- Based in: Minneapolis, Minnesota
- Arena: North Hennepin Community College
- Colors: Red, gold, orange
- Owner: Tamara Moore
- Head coach: Tamara Moore
- Website: https://www.htosports.com/teams/?u=MNFLAME&s=basketball

The Minnesota Flame was a semi-professional men's and women's basketball club of the World All-Star Basketball League. Founded in 2014, the Flame played one season, 2015, at North Hennepin Community College and Zanewood Rec Center in Brooklyn Park.

== History ==
Founded in Winter of 2014 by former professional basketball player Tamara Moore, the Minnesota Flame organization features a men's and women's minor league team. The teams are scheduled to begin play in the new World All-Star Basketball League (WABL) in the Fall of 2015. An exhibition season began in January 2015 through April.

On January 24, 2015, the Flame played their first-ever exhibition game, defeating the Minnesota Rangers 110–79. Four days later the team traveled to Las Vegas to face the Las Vegas Flames of the American Basketball Association. The Flame again came away on top, defeating Las Vegas 60–56.

== Season-by-season record ==
| Team | Season | W | L | Playoffs W-L | Playoffs Result |
|---|---|---|---|---|---|
| Men | Spring 2015 | 4 | 1 | N/A | Spring exhibition season |
| Women | Summer 2015 | 2 | 3 | N/A | Summer exhibition season vs WABA teams |

== Player Advancement ==
- Carlos Emory (Eastview HS '09 - Oregon Ducks '13) - Ponce Lions, BSN
