= Karleen Thompson =

American basketball coach (born 1968)

Personal information
- Born: July 1, 1968 (age 58) San Diego, California, U.S.

Career history

Coaching
- 2002–2003: Los Angeles Sparks (assistant)
- 2004: Los Angeles Sparks (interim)
- 2005–2007: Houston Comets (assistant)
- 2007–2008: Houston Comets
- 2010–2013: Clemson (assistant)
- 2013–2017: Atlanta Dream (associate HC)
- 2018–present: Virginia (associate HC)

Karleen M. Thompson (née Shields; born July 1, 1968) is the associate head coach of the Virginia Cavaliers women's basketball team since 2018. Before joining the Cavaliers, Thompson was a WNBA head coach for the Los Angeles Sparks in 2004 and the Houston Comets from 2007 to 2008. Additionally, Thompson was an assistant coach for the Clemson Tigers women's basketball team from 2010 to 2013 and the Atlanta Dream from 2013 to 2017.

== Early life and education ==
In 1968, Thompson was born in California. While attending high school in Snyder, Texas, Thompson played on the volleyball and basketball teams. For her post-secondary education, Thompson continued playing basketball with Contra Costa College in 1991 before moving to the USC Trojans women's basketball team in 1993.

== Career ==
After completing her social sciences degree at the University of Southern California in 1996, Thompson joined Gatorade as a sports marketer. The following year, Thompson started her Women's National Basketball Association career when she became a manager for the Los Angeles Sparks in 1997. With the Sparks, Thompson moved to assistant coach in 2002. In 2004, after the resignation of head coach Michael Cooper, Thompson was named one of the team's interim head coaches (the other being Ryan Weisenberg) in 2004. During the remainder of the 2004 season, Thompson had eleven wins and three losses as co-head coach. At the 2004 WNBA Playoffs, Thompson had one win and two losses before Los Angeles was defeated by the Sacramento Monarchs in the first round.

Upon leaving the Sparks, Thompson was an assistant coach of the Houston Comets between 2005 and 2007. While she was an assistant coach for a Moscow basketball team in 2007, Thompson was named the Comets general manager and head coach. With 30 wins and 38 losses as the Comets' head coach from 2007 to 2008, Thompson left the WNBA to work in college basketball as an assistant coach for the Clemson Tigers women's basketball team from 2010 to 2013. She resumed her WNBA career in 2013 when she became an associate head coach for the Atlanta Dream and held the position until 2017. In 2018, she continued to work as an associate head coach when she was hired by the Virginia Cavaliers women's basketball team.

== Head coaching record ==
Team	Year	G	W	L	W–L%	Finish	PG	PW	PL	PW–L%	Result
Los Angeles	2004	14	11	3	.786	1st in Western	3	1	2	.333	Lost Conference semifinals
Houston	2007	34	13	21	.382	5th in Western	—	—	—	—	Missed playoffs
Houston	2008	34	17	17	.500	5th in Western	—	—	—	—	Missed playoffs
Career		82	41	41	.500		3	1	2	.333	

== Personal life ==
In February 2009, Thompson sued the WNBA in a New York district court lawsuit. In the case, Thompson said she was misled to stay with the WNBA when the organization took over the Comets in March 2008. Additionally, Thompson stated she had lost future job positions when the Comets disbanded in December 2008. The case was dismissed in October 2009 due to a lack of diversity jurisdiction.
