= Western Conference (WNBA) =

WNBA Western Conference

- League: WNBA
- Sport: Basketball
- First season: 1997
- No. of teams: 9
- Most recent champion: Las Vegas Aces (2025)
- Most titles: Minnesota Lynx (4)

The Western Conference is one of two conferences that make up the Women's National Basketball Association (WNBA), the other being the Eastern Conference. The Western Conference consists of 9 teams and the Eastern Conference consists of 6 teams.

From the league's second season in 1998 through 2015, the WNBA operated separate playoff brackets for its Eastern and Western Conferences. Each conference's playoff was divided into two playoff rounds, the Conference Semi-Finals and the Conference Finals, with the Conference Finals winners receiving Conference Championships and advancing to the WNBA Finals to determine the WNBA champion. In the final years of this playoff scheme, all in-conference playoff series were best-of-three.

In the current system, the eight best teams by the regular-season record, without regard to conference alignment, qualify for the playoffs. Since 2022, the playoffs have been held in a standard knockout format, with the first round consisting of best-of-three series and the semifinals and finals being best-of-five. The higher seed will generally face a weaker team, and will have home-court advantage in each round. In 2024, all quarterfinal series used a 2–1 home-court pattern, which allowed the higher seed the opportunity to win the series without having to visit the lower seed. This in turn meant that a lower seed that won one of the first two games would host the series decider. However, the quarterfinals will return to a 1–1–1 pattern in 2025, with the higher seed hosting the first game and a potential third game.

The quarterfinals are bracketed in the normal manner for an 8-team tournament, with 1 vs. 8 and 4 vs. 5 on one side of the bracket and 2 vs. 7 and 3 vs. 6 on the other. The winners of each quarterfinal series advance to the semifinals, with the bracket not being reseeded. The semifinals use a 2–2–1 home-court pattern, meaning that the higher-seeded team will have home court in games 1, 2, and 5 while the other team plays at home in game 3 and 4. Through 2024, the finals were also played in a 2–2–1 home-court pattern. Starting in 2025, the finals will use the same 2–2–1–1–1 pattern currently used by the National Basketball Association.

== Teams ==
Team	City/Area	Arena	Colors	Joined WNBA	Head coach
Dallas Wings	Arlington, Texas	College Park Center	Dark blue, lime green, white	1998*	Jose Fernandez
Golden State Valkyries	San Francisco, California	Chase Center	Black, purple	2025	Natalie Nakase
Houston Comets	Houston, Texas	Toyota Center	Red, silver, blue	1999*	Rachid Meziane
Las Vegas Aces	Paradise, Nevada	Michelob Ultra Arena	Red, black, gold, silver	1997*	Becky Hammon
Los Angeles Sparks	Los Angeles, California	Crypto.com Arena	Purple, gold, teal	1997	TBA
Minnesota Lynx	Minneapolis, Minnesota	Target Center	Blue, green, white, silver	1999	Cheryl Reeve
Portland Fire	Portland, Oregon	Moda Center	Red, brown, blue, pink	2026	Alex Sarama
Phoenix Mercury	Phoenix, Arizona	Mortgage Matchup Center	Purple, yellow, orange, white	1997	Nate Tibbetts
Seattle Storm	Seattle, Washington	Climate Pledge Arena	Green, red, white, gold	2000	Sonia Raman

=== Former teams ===
Defunct

- Portland Fire (2000–2002)
- Sacramento Monarchs (1997–2009)
- Houston Comets (1997–2008)

Relocated

- Orlando Miracle (East) to Connecticut Sun (East) (2003)
- Utah Starzz to San Antonio Silver Stars (2003)
- Detroit Shock (East) to Tulsa Shock (2010)
- Tulsa Shock to Dallas Wings (2016)
- San Antonio Stars to Las Vegas Aces (2017)
- Connecticut Sun (East) to Houston Comets (2026)

== Western Conference champions ==
The WNBA awarded conference championships between 1998 and 2015 to the winners of the Conference Finals in the playoffs. Conference championships were not awarded in the 1997 inaugural season, and they were again discontinued since the WNBA adopted its current single-table playoff format in 2016.

WNBA champions in bold

- 1998: **Houston Comets**
- 1999: **Houston Comets** (2)
- 2000: **Houston Comets** (3)
- 2001: **Los Angeles Sparks**
- 2002: **Los Angeles Sparks** (2)
- 2003: Los Angeles Sparks (3)
- 2004: **Seattle Storm**
- 2005: **Sacramento Monarchs**
- 2006: Sacramento Monarchs (2)
- 2007: **Phoenix Mercury**
- 2008: San Antonio Silver Stars
- 2009: **Phoenix Mercury** (2)
- 2010: **Seattle Storm** (2)
- 2011: **Minnesota Lynx**
- 2012: Minnesota Lynx (2)
- 2013: **Minnesota Lynx** (3)
- 2014: **Phoenix Mercury** (3)
- 2015: **Minnesota Lynx** (4)

== All-time regular-season conference standings ==
=== 2026 season ===
#	Team	W	L	PCT	GB	Conf.	Home	Road	Cup
1	**y** — Minnesota Lynx	33	11	.750	–	20–3	15–7	18–4	6–1
2	**x** — Golden State Valkyries	32	12	.727	1	15–8	17–5	15–7	5–2
3	**x** — Las Vegas Aces	31	13	.705	2	17–6	15–7	16–6	6–1
4	**x** — Atlanta Dream	30	14	.682	3	15–5	15–7	15–7	4–2
5	**x** — Washington Mystics	28	16	.636	5	15–5	15–7	13–9	3–3
6	**x** — Indiana Fever	28	16	.636	5	14–6	15–7	13–9	5–1
7	**x** — Dallas Wings	27	17	.614	6	13–10	16–6	11–11	4–3
8	**cx** – New York Liberty	26	18	.591	7	13–7	14–8	12–10	6–0
9	**e** — Portland Fire	17	27	.386	16	7–16	9–13	8–14	2–5
10	**e** — Phoenix Mercury	16	28	.364	17	10–13	7–15	9–13	2–5
11	**e** — Chicago Sky	16	28	.364	17	4–16	11–11	5–17	1–5
12	**e** — Los Angeles Sparks	16	28	.364	17	9–14	8–14	8–14	3–4
13	**e** — Toronto Tempo	11	33	.250	22	5–15	7–15	4–18	2–4
14	**e** — Connecticut Sun	11	33	.250	22	4–16	8–14	3–19	0–6
15	**e** — Seattle Storm	8	36	.182	25	1–22	6–16	2–20	0–7

Notes

(#) – League Standing
c – Commissioner's Cup winner
y – Regular season champion
x – Clinched playoff berth
e – Eliminated from playoff contention
Source: Overall standings and Commissioner's Cup Standings

=== 2025 season ===
#	Team	W	L	PCT	GB	Conf.	Home	Road	Cup
1	**yx** – Minnesota Lynx	34	10	.773	–	20–4	20–2	14–8	5–1
2	**x** – Las Vegas Aces	30	14	.682	4	16–8	17–5	13–9	2–4
3	**x** – Atlanta Dream	30	14	.682	4	15–6	16–6	14–8	3–2
4	**x** – Phoenix Mercury	27	17	.614	7	13–11	15–7	12–10	4–2
5	**x** – New York Liberty	27	17	.614	7	15–5	17–5	10–12	4–1
6	**cx** – Indiana Fever	24	20	.545	10	13–8	13–9	11–11	4–1
7	**x** – Seattle Storm	23	21	.523	11	12–12	10–12	13–9	4–2
8	**x** – Golden State Valkyries	23	21	.523	11	9–15	14–8	9–13	3–3
9	**e** – Los Angeles Sparks	21	23	.477	13	10–14	9–13	12–10	2–4
10	**e** – Washington Mystics	16	28	.364	18	8–12	10–12	6–16	2–3
11	**e** – Connecticut Sun	11	33	.250	23	7–14	7–15	4–18	1–4
12	**e** – Chicago Sky	10	34	.227	24	4–17	6–16	4–18	1–4
13	**e** – Dallas Wings	10	34	.227	24	4–20	6–16	4–18	1–5

Notes

(#) – League Standing
c – Commissioner's Cup winners
y – Regular Season Champion
x – Clinched playoff berth
e – Eliminated from playoff contention
Source: Overall standings and Commissioner's Cup Standings

=== 2024 season ===
#	Team	W	L	PCT	GB	Conf.	Home	Road	Cup
1	**yx** – New York Liberty	32	8	.800	—	16–4	16–4	16–4	5–0
2	**cx** – Minnesota Lynx	30	10	.750	2	14–6	16–4	14–6	4–1
3	**x** – Connecticut Sun	28	12	.700	4	14–6	14–6	14–6	4–1
4	**x** – Las Vegas Aces	27	13	.675	5	12–8	13–7	14–6	2–3
5	**x** – Seattle Storm	25	15	.625	7	13–7	14–6	11–9	4–1
6	**x** – Indiana Fever	20	20	.500	12	11–9	12–8	8–12	3–2
7	**x** – Phoenix Mercury	19	21	.475	13	10–10	10–10	9–11	3–2
8	**x** – Atlanta Dream	15	25	.375	17	7–13	8–12	7–13	1–4
9	**e** – Washington Mystics	14	26	.350	18	7–13	5–15	9–11	1–4
10	**e** – Chicago Sky	13	27	.325	19	5–15	6–14	7–13	1–4
11	**e** – Dallas Wings	9	31	.225	23	6–14	7–13	2–18	0–5
12	**e** – Los Angeles Sparks	8	32	.200	24	5–15	5–15	3–17	2–3

Notes

(#) – League Standing
c – Commissioner's Cup winners
y – Regular Season Champion
x – Clinched playoff berth
e – Eliminated from playoff contention
Source: Overall standings and Commissioner's Cup Standings

=== 2023 season ===
#	Team	W	L	PCT	GB	Conf.	Home	Road	Cup
1	**x** – Las Vegas Aces	34	6	.850	–	18–2	19–1	15–5	9–1
2	**x** – New York Liberty	32	8	.800	2	16–4	15–5	17–3	7–3
3	**x** – Connecticut Sun	27	13	.675	7	14–6	13–7	14–6	7–3
4	**x** – Dallas Wings	22	18	.550	12	11–9	11–9	11–9	6–4
5	**x** – Atlanta Dream	19	21	.475	15	11–9	11–9	8–12	6–4
6	**x** – Minnesota Lynx	19	21	.475	15	12–8	9–11	10–10	5–5
7	**x** – Washington Mystics	19	21	.475	15	9–11	12–8	7–13	5–5
8	**x** – Chicago Sky	18	22	.450	16	5–15	7–13	11–9	3–7
9	**e** – Los Angeles Sparks	17	23	.425	17	9–11	10–10	7–13	5–5
10	**e** – Indiana Fever	13	27	.325	21	5–15	6–14	7–13	2–8
11	**e** – Seattle Storm	11	29	.275	23	8–12	4–16	7–13	4–6
12	**e** – Phoenix Mercury	9	31	.225	25	2–18	8–12	1–19	1–9

Notes

(#) – League Standing
x – Clinched playoff berth
e – Eliminated from postseason contention
Source: Overall standings and Commissioner's Cup Standings

=== 2022 season ===
#	Team	W	L	PCT	GB	Conf.	Home	Road	Cup
1	**x** – Las Vegas Aces	26	10	.722	–	15–3	13–5	13–5	9–1
2	**x** – Chicago Sky	26	10	.722	–	15–3	14–4	12–6	9–1
3	**x** – Connecticut Sun	25	11	.694	1.0	11–7	13–5	12–6	5–5
4	**x** – Seattle Storm	22	14	.611	4.0	10–8	13–5	9–9	6–4
5	**x** – Washington Mystics	22	14	.611	4.0	11–7	12–6	10–8	5–5
6	**x** – Dallas Wings	18	18	.500	8.0	8–10	8–10	10–8	5–5
7	**x** – New York Liberty	16	20	.444	10.0	10–8	9–9	7–11	6–4
8	**x** – Phoenix Mercury	15	21	.417	11.0	7–11	11–7	4–14	3–7
9	**e** – Minnesota Lynx	14	22	.389	12.0	8–10	7–11	7–11	4–6
10	**e** – Atlanta Dream	14	22	.389	12.0	5–13	8–10	6–12	3–7
11	**e** – Los Angeles Sparks	13	23	.361	13.0	6–12	7–11	6–12	3–7
12	**e** – Indiana Fever	5	31	.139	21.0	2–16	3–15	2–16	2–8

Notes

(#) – League Standing
x – Clinched playoff berth
e – Eliminated from playoff contention
Source: Overall standings and Commissioner's Cup Standings

=== 2021 season ===
#	Team	W	L	PCT	GB	Conf.	Home	Road	Cup
1	**x** – Connecticut Sun	26	6	.813	–	12–3	15–1	11–5	9–1
2	**x** – Las Vegas Aces	24	8	.750	2	11–4	13–3	11–5	6–4
3	**x** – Minnesota Lynx	22	10	.688	4	10–5	13–3	9–7	7–3
4	**x** – Seattle Storm	21	11	.656	5	9–6	11–5	10–6	8–2
5	**x** – Phoenix Mercury	19	13	.594	7	6–9	7–9	12–4	5–5
6	**x** – Chicago Sky	16	16	.500	10	10–5	6–10	10–6	6–4
7	**x** – Dallas Wings	14	18	.438	12	7–8	7–9	7–9	3–7
8	**x** – New York Liberty	12	20	.375	14	6–9	7–9	5–11	5–5
9	**e** – Washington Mystics	12	20	.375	14	7–8	8–8	4–12	4–6
10	**e** – Los Angeles Sparks	12	20	.375	14	2–13	8–8	4–12	1–9
11	**e** – Atlanta Dream	8	24	.250	18	6–9	4–12	4–12	4–6
12	**e** – Indiana Fever	6	26	.188	20	4–11	4–12	2–14	2–8

Notes

(#) – League Standing
x – Clinched playoff berth
e – Eliminated from playoff contention
Source: Overall standings and Commissioner's Cup Standings

=== 2020 season ===
#	Team	W	L	PCT	GB	Conf.
1	**x** – Las Vegas Aces	18	4	.818	–	8–2
2	**x** – Seattle Storm	18	4	.818	–	8–2
3	**x** – Los Angeles Sparks	15	7	.682	3	5–5
4	**x** – Minnesota Lynx	14	8	.636	4	4–6
5	**x** – Phoenix Mercury	13	9	.591	5	4–6
6	**x** – Chicago Sky	12	10	.545	6	6–4
7	**x** – Connecticut Sun	10	12	.455	8	7–3
8	**x** – Washington Mystics	9	13	.409	9	6–4
9	**e** – Dallas Wings	8	14	.364	10	1–9
10	**e** – Atlanta Dream	7	15	.318	11	5–5
11	**e** – Indiana Fever	6	16	.273	12	4–6
12	**e** – New York Liberty	2	20	.091	16	2–8

Notes

x – Clinched playoff berth
e – Eliminated from playoffs
Home and Away records not shown, as all games played at a neutral location.
Updated to include results from September 13, 2020

=== 2019 season ===
#	Western Conference	W	L	PCT	GB	Home	Road	Conf.
1	Los Angeles Sparks **(3)**	22	12	.647	–	15–2	7–10	10–6
2	Las Vegas Aces **(4)**	21	13	.618	1	13–4	8–9	11–5
3	Seattle Storm **(6)**	18	16	.529	4	11–6	7–10	10–6
4	Minnesota Lynx **(7)**	18	16	.529	4	11–6	7–10	7–9
5	Phoenix Mercury **(8)**	15	19	.441	7	9–8	6–11	5–11
6	**e** – Dallas Wings	10	24	.294	12	8–9	2–15	5–11

Notes

(#) – Conference Standing, Playoff Seeds shown to the right of team name
e – Eliminated from playoffs

=== 2018 season ===
#	Western Conference	W	L	PCT	GB	Home	Road	Conf.
1	Seattle Storm **(1)**	26	8	.765	–	13–4	13–4	11–5
2	Phoenix Mercury **(5)**	20	14	.588	6	9–8	11–6	8–8
3	Los Angeles Sparks **(6)**	19	15	.559	7	11–6	8–9	9–7
4	Minnesota Lynx **(7)**	18	16	.529	8	9–8	9–8	9–7
5	Dallas Wings **(8)**	15	19	.441	11	10–7	5–12	7–9
6	**e** –Las Vegas Aces	14	20	.412	12	8–9	6–11	4–12

Notes

(#) – Conference Standing, Playoff Seeds shown to the right of team name
x – Qualified for playoffs
e – Eliminated from playoffs

=== 2017 season ===
#	Western Conference	W	L	PCT	GB	Home	Road	Conf.
1	Minnesota Lynx - **(1)**	27	7	.794	–	15–2	12–5	13–3
2	Los Angeles Sparks - **(2)**	26	8	.765	1	16–1	10–7	12–4
3	Phoenix Mercury - **(5)**	18	16	.529	9	9–8	9–8	7–9
4	Dallas Wings - **(7)**	16	18	.471	11	10–7	6–11	7–9
5	Seattle Storm - **(8)**	15	19	.441	12	10–7	5–12	8–8
6	San Antonio Stars - **e**	8	26	.235	19	6–11	2–15	1–15

Notes

(#) – Conference Standing
Playoff Seeds shown next to team name
e – Eliminated from playoffs

=== 2016 season ===
Western Conference	W	L	PCT	GB	Home	Road	Conf.
**1** - Minnesota Lynx	28	6	.824	—	15–2	13–4	15–1
**2** - Los Angeles Sparks	26	8	.765	2	14–3	12–5	11–5
**7** - Seattle Storm	16	18	.471	12	10–7	6–11	7–9
**8** - Phoenix Mercury	16	18	.471	12	11–6	5–12	6–10
**e** - Dallas Wings	11	23	.324	17	6–11	5–12	8–8
**e** - San Antonio Stars	7	27	.206	21	4–13	3–14	1–15

Notes

# – Playoff seed
e – Eliminated from playoffs

=== 2015 season ===
Western Conference	W	L	PCT	GB	Home	Road	Conf.
**z** - Minnesota Lynx	22	12	.647	–	13–4	9–8	16–6
**x** - Phoenix Mercury	20	14	.588	2	13–4	7–10	15–7
**x** - Tulsa Shock	18	16	.529	4	12–5	6–11	11–11
**x** - Los Angeles Sparks	14	20	.412	8	9–8	5–12	10–12
**e** - Seattle Storm	10	24	.294	12	8–9	2–15	8–14
**e** - San Antonio Stars	8	26	.235	14	7–10	1–16	6–16

=== 2014 season ===
#	Western Conference					
#	Team	W	L	PCT	GB	GP
1	y-Phoenix Mercury	29	5	.853	-	34
2	x-Minnesota Lynx	25	9	.735	4.0	34
3	x-San Antonio Stars	16	18	.471	13.0	34
4	x-Los Angeles Sparks	16	18	.471	13.0	34
5	e-Tulsa Shock	12	22	.353	17.0	34
6	e-Seattle Storm	12	22	.353	17.0	34

=== 2013 season ===
#	Western Conference					
#	Team	W	L	PCT	GB	GP
1	**z**-Minnesota Lynx	26	8	.765	-	34
2	**x**-Los Angeles Sparks	24	10	.706	2	34
3	**x**-Phoenix Mercury	19	15	.559	7	34
4	**x**-Seattle Storm	17	17	.500	9	34
5	**e**-San Antonio Silver Stars	12	22	.353	14	34
6	**e**-Tulsa Shock	11	23	.324	15	34

=== 2012 season ===
Western Conference	W	L	PCT	GB	Home	Road	Conf.
Minnesota Lynx ^{z}	27	7	.794	–	16–1	11–6	17–5
Los Angeles Sparks ^{x}	24	10	.706	3.0	16–1	8–9	15–7
San Antonio Silver Stars ^{x}	21	13	.618	6.0	12–5	9–8	14–8
Seattle Storm ^{x}	16	18	.471	11.0	10–7	6–11	11–11
Tulsa Shock ^{o}	9	25	.265	18.0	6–11	3–14	5–17
Phoenix Mercury ^{o}	7	27	.206	20.0	3–14	4–13	4–18

=== 2011 season ===
Western Conference	W	L	PCT	GB	Home	Road	Conf.
Minnesota Lynx ^{x}	27	7	.794	–	14–3	13–4	18–4
Seattle Storm ^{x}	21	13	.618	6.0	15–2	6–11	15–7
Phoenix Mercury ^{x}	19	15	.559	8.0	11–6	8–9	11–11
San Antonio Silver Stars ^{x}	18	16	.529	9.0	9–8	9–8	11–11
Los Angeles Sparks ^{o}	15	19	.441	12.0	10–7	5–12	10–12
Tulsa Shock ^{o}	3	31	.088	24.0	2–15	1–16	1–21

=== 2010 season ===
Western Conference	W	L	PCT	GB	Home	Road	Conf.
Seattle Storm ^{x}	28	6	.824	–	17–0	11–6	20–2
Phoenix Mercury ^{x}	15	19	.441	13.0	9–8	6–11	13–9
San Antonio Silver Stars ^{x}	14	20	.412	14.0	8–9	6–11	11–11
Los Angeles Sparks ^{x}	13	21	.382	15.0	8–9	5–12	10–12
Minnesota Lynx ^{o}	13	21	.382	15.0	7–10	6–11	8–14
Tulsa Shock ^{o}	6	28	.176	22.0	4–13	2–15	4–18

=== 2009 season ===
Western Conference	W	L	PCT	GB	Home	Road	Conf.
Phoenix Mercury ^{x}	23	11	.676	–	12–5	11–6	13–7
Seattle Storm ^{x}	20	14	.588	3.0	13–4	7–10	13–7
Los Angeles Sparks ^{x}	18	16	.529	5.0	11–6	7–10	11–9
San Antonio Silver Stars ^{x}	15	19	.441	8.0	10–7	5–12	10–10
Minnesota Lynx ^{o}	14	20	.412	9.0	9–8	5–12	7–13
Sacramento Monarchs ^{o}	12	22	.353	11.0	7–10	5–12	6–14

=== 2008 season ===
Western Conference	W	L	PCT	GB	Home	Road	Conf.
San Antonio Silver Stars ^{x}	24	10	.706	–	15–2	9–8	10–10
Seattle Storm ^{x}	22	12	.647	2.0	16–1	6–11	13–7
Los Angeles Sparks ^{x}	20	14	.588	4.0	12–5	8–9	12–8
Sacramento Monarchs ^{x}	18	16	.529	6.0	5–12	13–4	9–11
Houston Comets ^{o}	17	17	.500	7.0	13–4	4–13	10–10
Minnesota Lynx ^{o}	16	18	.471	8.0	10–7	6–11	8–12
Phoenix Mercury ^{o}	16	18	.471	8.0	9–8	7–10	8–12

=== 2007 season ===
Western Conference	W	L	PCT	GB	Home	Road	Conf.
Phoenix Mercury ^{x}	23	11	.676	–	12–5	11–6	17–5
San Antonio Silver Stars ^{x}	20	14	.588	3.0	9–8	11–6	13–9
Sacramento Monarchs ^{x}	19	15	.559	4.0	12–5	7–10	12–10
Seattle Storm ^{x}	17	17	.500	6.0	12–5	5–12	11–11
Houston Comets ^{o}	13	21	.382	10.0	7–10	6–11	10–12
Minnesota Lynx ^{o}	10	24	.294	13.0	7–10	3–14	8–14
Los Angeles Sparks ^{o}	10	24	.294	13.0	5–12	5–12	6–16

=== 2006 season ===
Western Conference	W	L	PCT	GB	Home	Road	Conf.
Los Angeles Sparks ^{x}	25	9	.735	–	15–2	10–7	15–5
Sacramento Monarchs ^{x}	21	13	.618	4.0	14–3	7–10	10–10
Houston Comets ^{x}	18	16	.529	7.0	12–5	6–11	11–9
Seattle Storm ^{x}	18	16	.529	7.0	9–8	9–8	10–10
Phoenix Mercury ^{o}	18	16	.529	7.0	10–7	8–9	8–12
San Antonio Silver Stars ^{o}	13	21	.382	12.0	6–11	7–10	10–10
Minnesota Lynx ^{o}	10	24	.294	15.0	8–9	2–15	6–14

=== 2005 season ===
Western Conference	W	L	PCT	GB	Home	Road	Conf.
Sacramento Monarchs ^{x}	25	9	.735	–	15–2	10–7	17–5
Seattle Storm ^{x}	20	14	.588	5.0	14–3	6–11	13–9
Houston Comets ^{x}	19	15	.559	6.0	11–6	8–9	11–11
Los Angeles Sparks ^{x}	17	17	.500	8.0	11–6	6–11	12–10
Phoenix Mercury ^{o}	16	18	.471	9.0	11–6	5–12	12–10
Minnesota Lynx ^{o}	14	20	.412	11.0	11–6	3–14	9–13
San Antonio Silver Stars ^{o}	7	27	.206	18.0	5–12	2–15	3–19

=== 2004 season ===
Western Conference	W	L	PCT	GB	Home	Road	Conf.
Los Angeles Sparks ^{x}	25	9	.735	–	15–2	10–7	16–6
Seattle Storm ^{x}	20	14	.588	5.0	13–4	7–10	13–9
Minnesota Lynx ^{x}	18	16	.529	7.0	11–6	7–10	12–10
Sacramento Monarchs ^{x}	18	16	.529	7.0	10–7	8–9	12–10
Phoenix Mercury ^{o}	17	17	.500	8.0	10–7	7–10	11–11
Houston Comets ^{o}	13	21	.382	12.0	9–8	4–13	7–15
San Antonio Silver Stars ^{o}	9	25	.265	16.0	6–11	3–14	6–16

=== 2003 season ===
Western Conference	W	L	PCT	GB	Home	Road	Conf.
Los Angeles Sparks ^{x}	24	10	.706	–	11–6	13–4	17–7
Houston Comets ^{x}	20	14	.588	4.0	14–3	6–11	14–10
Sacramento Monarchs ^{x}	19	15	.559	5.0	12–5	7–10	13–11
Minnesota Lynx ^{x}	18	16	.529	6.0	11–6	7–10	14–10
Seattle Storm ^{o}	18	16	.529	6.0	13–4	5–12	11–13
San Antonio Silver Stars ^{o}	12	22	.353	12.0	9–8	3–14	10–14
Phoenix Mercury ^{o}	8	26	.235	16.0	6–11	2–15	5–19

=== 2002 season ===
Western Conference	W	L	PCT	Conf.	GB
Los Angeles Sparks ^{x}	25	7	.781	17–4	–
Houston Comets ^{x}	24	8	.750	16–5	1.0
Utah Starzz ^{x}	20	12	.625	12–9	5.0
Seattle Storm ^{x}	17	15	.531	10–11	8.0
Portland Fire ^{o}	16	16	.500	8–13	9.0
Sacramento Monarchs ^{o}	14	18	.438	8–13	11.0
Phoenix Mercury ^{o}	11	21	.344	7–14	14.0
Minnesota Lynx ^{o}	10	22	.313	6–15	15.0

=== 2001 season ===
Western Conference	W	L	PCT	Conf.	GB
Los Angeles Sparks ^{x}	28	4	.875	19–2	–
Sacramento Monarchs ^{x}	20	12	.625	13–8	8.0
Utah Starzz ^{x}	19	13	.594	11–10	9.0
Houston Comets ^{x}	19	13	.594	13–8	9.0
Phoenix Mercury ^{o}	13	19	.406	8–13	15.0
Minnesota Lynx ^{o}	12	20	.375	9–12	16.0
Portland Fire ^{o}	11	21	.344	5–16	17.0
Seattle Storm ^{o}	10	22	.313	6–15	18.0

=== 2000 season ===
Western Conference	W	L	PCT	Conf.	GB
Los Angeles Sparks ^{x}	28	4	.875	17–4	–
Houston Comets ^{x}	27	5	.844	17–4	1.0
Sacramento Monarchs ^{x}	21	11	.656	13–8	7.0
Phoenix Mercury ^{x}	20	12	.625	11–10	8.0
Utah Starzz ^{o}	18	14	.563	13–8	10.0
Minnesota Lynx ^{o}	15	17	.469	5–16	13.0
Portland Fire ^{o}	10	22	.313	4–17	18.0
Seattle Storm ^{o}	6	26	.188	4–17	22.0

=== 1999 season ===
Western Conference	W	L	PCT	Conf.	GB
Houston Comets ^{x}	26	6	.813	16–4	–
Los Angeles Sparks ^{x}	20	12	.625	12–8	6.0
Sacramento Monarchs ^{x}	19	13	.594	9–11	7.0
Phoenix Mercury ^{o}	15	17	.469	7–13	11.0
Minnesota Lynx ^{o}	15	17	.469	8–12	11.0
Utah Starzz ^{o}	15	17	.469	8–12	11.0

=== 1998 season ===
Western Conference	W	L	PCT	Conf.	GB
Houston Comets ^{x}	27	3	.900	15–1	–
Phoenix Mercury ^{x}	19	11	.633	10–6	8.0
Los Angeles Sparks ^{o}	12	18	.400	6–10	15.0
Sacramento Monarchs ^{o}	8	22	.267	5–11	19.0
Utah Starzz ^{o}	8	22	.267	4–12	19.0

=== 1997 season ===
Western Conference	W	L	PCT	Conf.	GB
Phoenix Mercury ^{x}	16	12	.571	9–3	–
Los Angeles Sparks ^{o}	14	14	.500	8–4	2.0
Sacramento Monarchs ^{o}	10	18	.357	4–8	6.0
Utah Starzz ^{o}	7	21	.250	3–9	9.0
