= McFarland High School =

McFarland High School may refer to:

- McFarland High School (Wisconsin), in McFarland, Wisconsin
- McFarland High School (California), in McFarland, California
