= Reliant Arena =

Arena in Texas, United States

Coordinates: 29°40′52″N 95°24′20″W

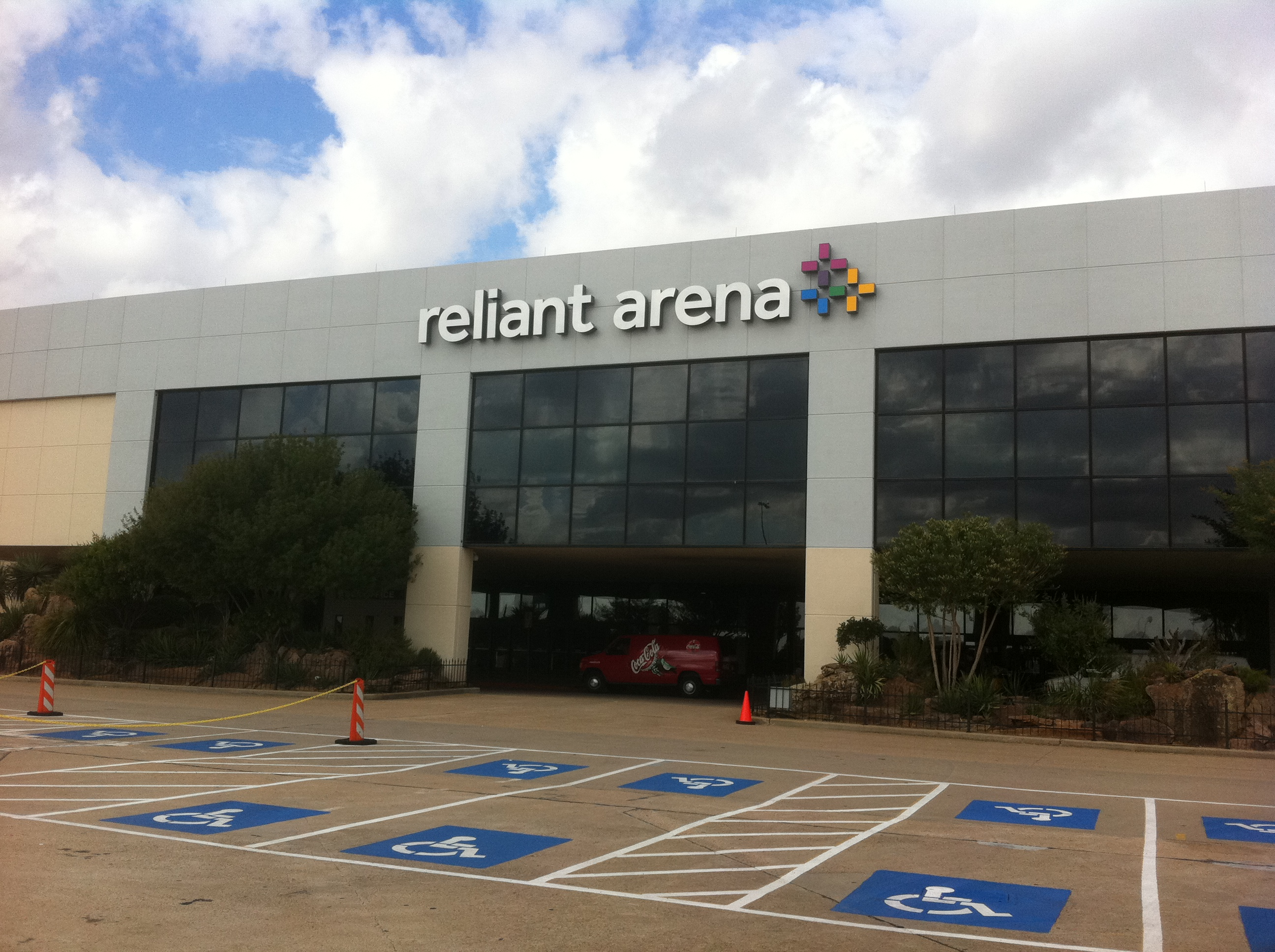
- Exterior of venue (c.2011)
- Full name: Reliant Arena at Reliant Park
- Former names: Astroarena (1974-2000); Reliant Arena (2000–14, August 2026–present); NRG Arena (2014–July 2026)
- Address: 1 Reliant Park; Houston, TX 77054-1574
- Location: Reliant Park
- Owner: Harris County Sports and Convention Corporation
- Operator: ASM Global
- Capacity: 8,000
- Public transit: Stadium Park/Astrodome

Construction
- Opened: February 14, 1974
- Architect: Lloyd Jones & Associates
- Main contractor: Pence Construction Company

Tenants
- Houston Angels (WBL) (1978-80); Houston Hotshots (WISL) (1999-2000); Houston Comets (WNBA) (2008)

Website
- Venue Info

The Reliant Arena (formerly the Astroarena and NRG Arena) is a 350,000 sq ft (33,000 m^{2}) sports center in Reliant Park, in Houston, Texas, USA.

== Building format ==
The main partition on the first floor is the "Arena Proper", a 24,000 gross square foot arena that seats up to 8,500 people.

In addition to the Arena Proper, there are four exhibit halls within the NRG Arena. The largest hall is Exhibit Hall D, boasting 100,000 square feet (10,000 m^{2}) of space. The second is Exhibit Hall A, which has 75,000 square feet (7,000 m^{2}) of space. Exhibit Halls B and C each have 50,000 square feet (5,000 m^{2}) of floor space as well.

The upper level maintains smaller meeting rooms and office space as well as the "Stockman's Club".

== History ==
Aerial photograph of the Astrodomain area by Carol M. Highsmith, c.1999. The round Astrodome is prominent; just to its south is the trefoil-shaped Astrohall, and the Astroarena is just east of the Astrohall

Construction of the Astroarena was completed in 1974 adjacent to the Astrohall. Although the Astrohall (renamed Reliant Hall temporarily) was demolished in May 2002 to make way for a parking lot when Reliant Stadium was being completed. Astroarena was renamed to Reliant Arena in 2000 when Reliant Energy bought the sponsorship of the facility.

The Arena has since been utilized for several other events, including the National Catholic Youth Conference in 2003 and the peripheral events of the Houston Livestock Show and Rodeo.

After previously occupying the Compaq Center from 1998 to 2000, the PBR held a Bud Light Cup event in Reliant Arena in 2001; this was their last big-league event in Houston to date.

In 1993, World Championship Wrestling held their Fall Brawl. Furthermore, the WWE hosted the March 31, 2005 episode of Smackdown.

In 2005, the Arena was used as auxiliary housing and a field clinic for residents displaced by Hurricane Katrina after it was deemed that the Reliant Astrodome would be insufficient for comfortably housing over 30,000 residents.

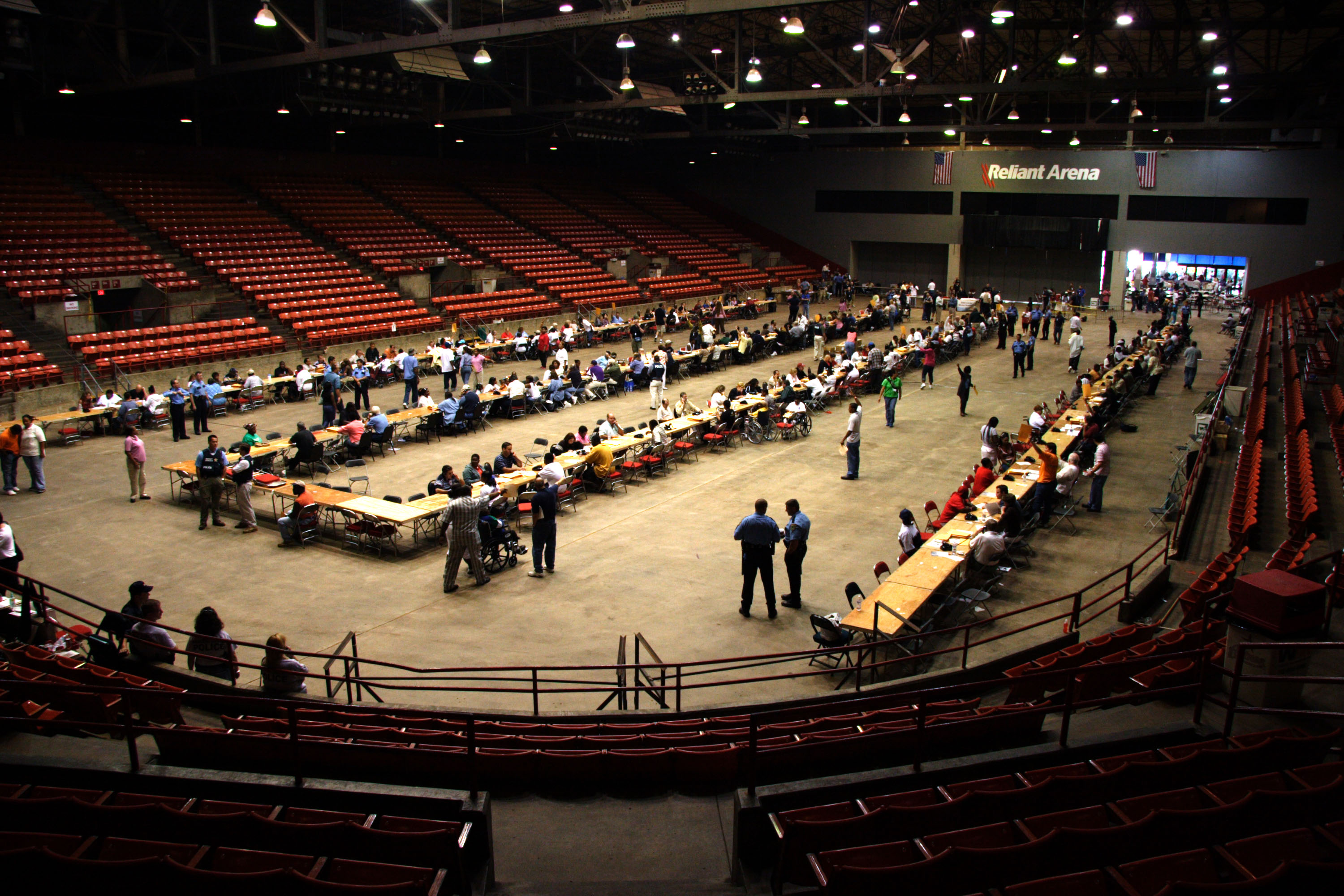
Reliant Arena in 2005

On July 16, 2007, the arena played host to the first indoor stop on the 2007 Vans Warped Tour.

On July 13, 2008, the arena hosted Total Nonstop Action Wrestling's Victory Road event.

Reliant Arena became the home of the Women's National Basketball Association's Houston Comets for what proved to be their final season, 2008.

On March 12, 2014, the arena was renamed as the NRG Arena, after the sponsor, Reliant Energy, was acquired by NRG Energy. The name was later changed back to Reliant Arena in August 2026.

Preceded by Toyota Center	Home of the Houston Comets; 2008	Succeeded by none
Preceded by TNA Impact! Zone	Host of Victory Road; 2008	Succeeded by TNA Impact! Zone
