= Toyota Center =

Arena in Houston, Texas, United States

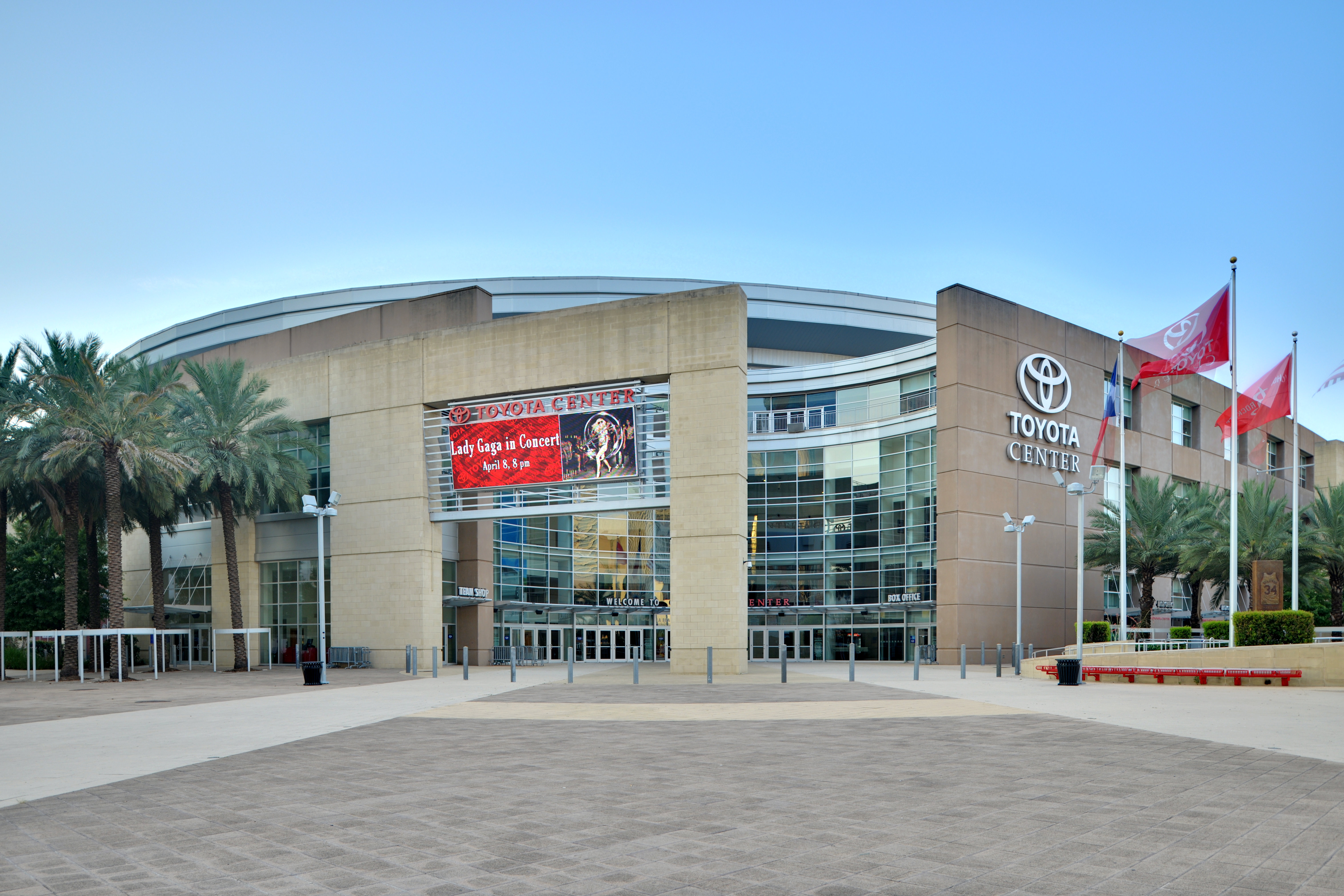
- Toyota Center in 2010

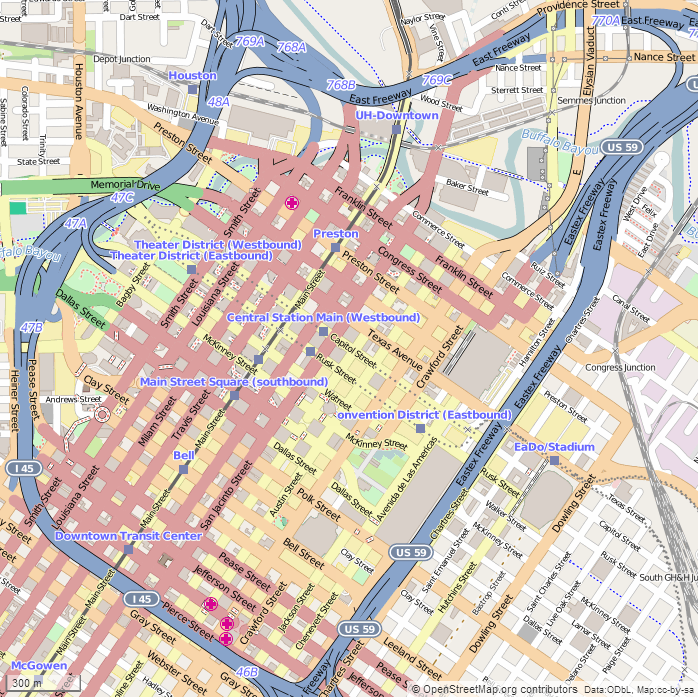
- Location in Houston Location in Texas Location in the United States
- Address: 1510 Polk Street
- Location: Houston, Texas, U.S.
- Coordinates: 29°45′3″N 95°21′44″W
- Owner: Harris County Houston Sports Authority
- Operator: Clutch City Sports and Entertainment
- Capacity: Concerts: 19,000; Basketball: 18,104; Hockey: 17,800
- Public transit: Bell

Construction
- Groundbreaking: July 31, 2001
- Opened: October 6, 2003
- Cost: US$235 million ($411 million in 2025 dollars)
- Architects: Populous (then HOK Sport); Morris Architects; John Chase Architects
- Structural engineer: Walter P Moore
- Services engineers: Bovay Engineers, Inc.
- General contractor: Hunt Construction Group

Tenants
- Houston Rockets (NBA) (2003–present); Houston Aeros (AHL) (2003–2013); Houston Comets (WNBA) (2004–2007); Houston Comets (WNBA) (2027–future)

Website
- toyotacenter.com

Toyota Center is an indoor arena located in Houston, Texas, United States. It is named after the Japanese automobile manufacturer Toyota. The arena is home to the Houston Rockets of the National Basketball Association (NBA), and it was once the home of the Houston Aeros of the American Hockey League (AHL), and the original Houston Comets of the Women's National Basketball Association (WNBA) and it will be once again the home of the new Houston Comets of the Women's National Basketball Association (WNBA) beginning in the 2027 season.

Rockets owner Leslie Alexander first began to request a new arena in 1995 and attempted to release the Rockets from their lease at The Summit, which ran until 2003. However, he was denied by arena owner Chuck Watson, then-owner of the Aeros, who also wanted control of a new arena. The two sides agreed to equal control over an arena in a deal signed in 1997, but the proposal was rejected by city voters in a 1999 referendum. It was not until the city and the Rockets signed an amended agreement in 2001, excluding the Aeros, that the proposal was accepted.

Construction began in July 2001, and the new arena was officially opened in October 2003. The total costs were $235 million, with the city of Houston paying the majority, and the Rockets paying for enhancements. Toyota paid US$100 million for the naming rights.

== History ==
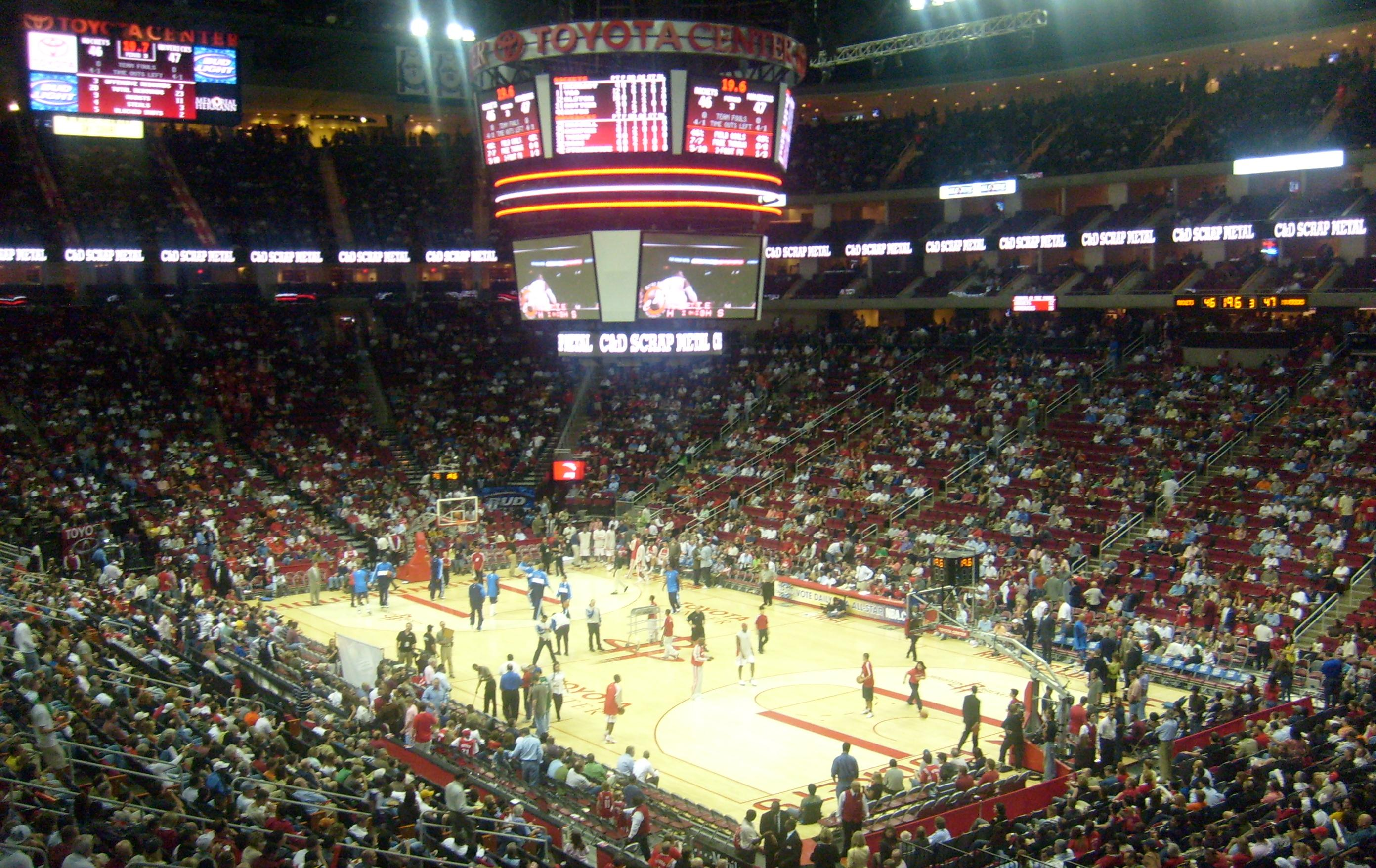
The interior of the arena during a Rockets game in 2007

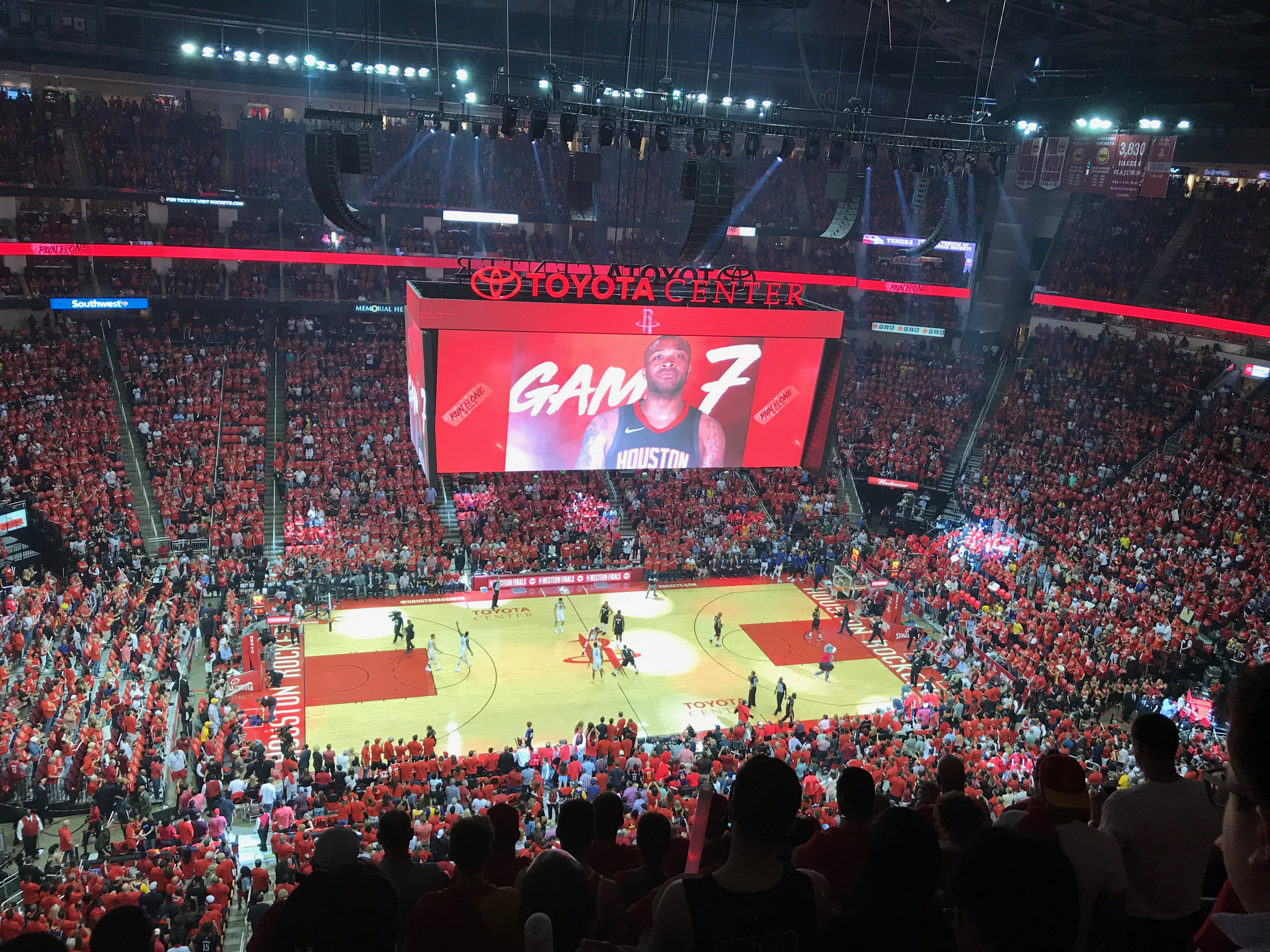
Opening tip in Game 7 of the 2018 NBA Western Conference Finals between the Houston Rockets and the Golden State Warriors.

In May 1995, several Texas sports teams, including the Houston Rockets, proposed legislation that would dedicate state tax revenue to build new arenas. Although the bill failed in the Texas House of Representatives, Rockets owner Leslie Alexander announced he would continue to study the possibility of constructing a new arena in downtown Houston, saying the 20-year-old Summit arena was too outdated to be profitable. Although the Summit's management said they could renovate the building for a small part of the cost of a new arena, the Rockets began talks with the city of Houston on a possible location for an arena, They also negotiated with Houston Aeros and Summit owner, Chuck Watson, to release them from their contract with the Summit, which ran until 2003.

As the negotiations continued into 1996, a panel appointed by Houston mayor Bob Lanier reported that building a new arena was "essential to keep pro sports in Houston". After Watson rejected a contract buyout proposal of $30 million, the Rockets filed a legal challenge against their lease, stating the "need to be able to buy out" of the lease. However, the city of Houston filed a counterclaim to force the Rockets to stay at the Summit, saying that if the Rockets did not honor their contract, then they might "have no incentive to honor any new agreement with the city of Houston to play in a new downtown sports arena". The validity of the lease was eventually upheld, and in April 1997, Lanier announced that the Rockets and Watson would have to agree to share control of the new arena equally, or lose access to it altogether. After both parties agreed to the terms, a bill that authorized increased taxes to pay for a new arena was signed into law in July, by then-Governor George W. Bush.

However, after the NHL decided not to consider Houston as a location for an expansion team because of the indecision over the new arena, Lanier said that he would not have a referendum in November. The Rockets began an appeal in January 1998 against the court order to stay at the Summit, but then dropped it in May, because they felt that a new arena would be ready by the time they finished their lease. In January 1999, recently elected mayor Lee Brown guaranteed a referendum on the issue before the end of the year. After several months negotiating with the Harris County-Houston Sports Authority, the Rockets finalized a deal to pay half of the constructions costs, and a referendum was set for November 2. The deal was approved by Brown and the Houston City Council, but Watson started an opposition group against the referendum, saying the arena was "not in Houston's interest". On November 3, the results of the referendum were announced, and the arena proposal was rejected by 54% of voters. Alexander said "we never thought we would lose" and that they were "devastated by the loss".

After the vote, NBA commissioner David Stern said "if there's not a new building...I think it's certain that the team will be relocated." The Houston Sports Authority had not planned to meet with the Rockets until after the 1999–2000 NBA season ended, but after the Rockets began to talk to other cities about relocation, they resumed talks in February 2000. Although the Rockets continued to negotiate with Louisville, Kentucky, a funding plan for the arena in Houston was released in June. A final agreement was proposed on July 6, and both the Rockets and mayor Brown agreed to the terms. After the city council approved the deal, the proposal was placed on the November referendum ballot. Leading up to the vote, the Rockets stressed that there would be "no new taxes of any kind", although opponents said the new arena would raise energy consumption, and also contended that the public would pay for too much of the costs of the arena. Contributions for the campaign for the arena included donations of US$400,000 from Reliant Energy, and a total of $590,000 in loans and contributions from Enron and Ken Lay, who the Rockets said was a "tireless" force in the campaign. On November 8, the arena was approved by 66% of voters.

=== Construction ===
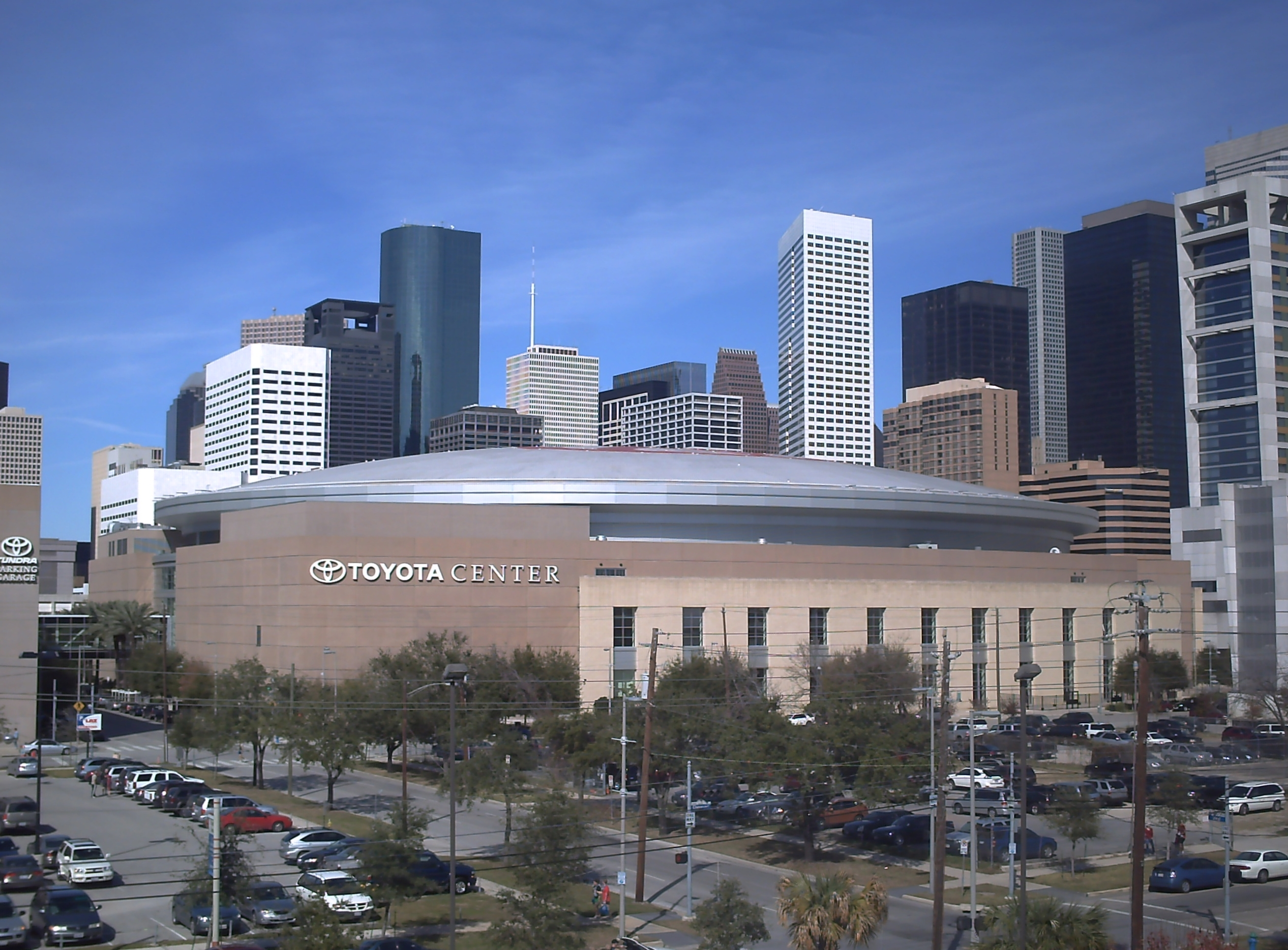
the back side of Toyota Center.

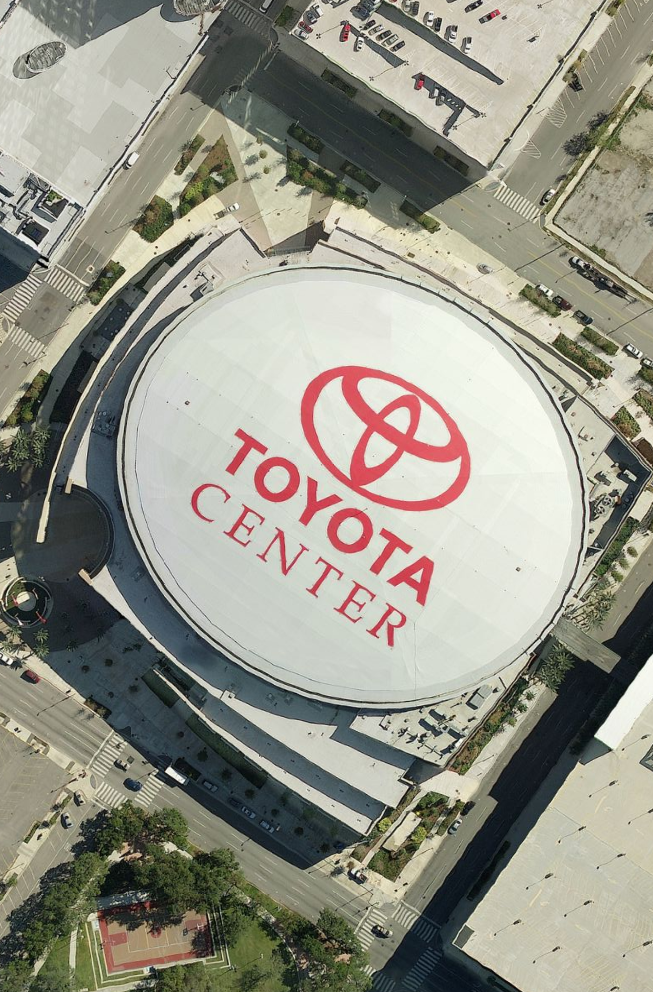
Toyota's logo is seen on the roof of the arena.

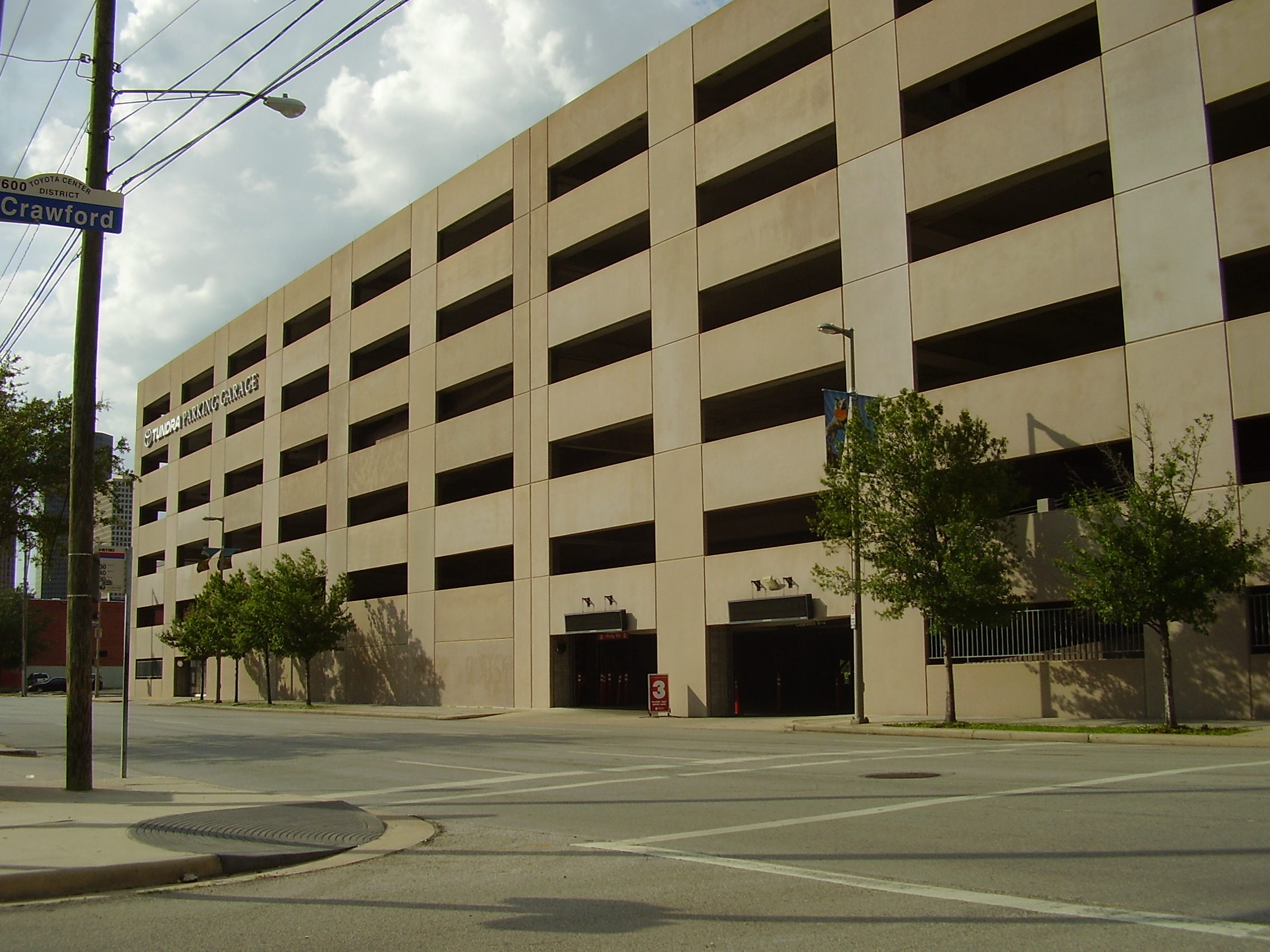
Toyota Center Tundra Parking Garage

According to the agreement signed, the city of Houston bought the land for the arena and an adjoining parking garage, which was near the George R. Brown Convention Center, and paid for it by selling bonds and borrowing $30 million. Morris Architects, designed the 750,000-square-foot (70,000 m^{2}) building, and Hunt Construction was contracted to build the arena. A building formerly owned by Houston Lighting and Power Company was demolished to make way for the arena, and two streets were closed for the duration of the construction. A groundbreaking ceremony was held on July 31, 2001, and construction continued for 26 months.

At the request of Alexander, the arena was built 32 feet (9.8 m) below street level, so fans would not have to walk up stairs to reach their seats. To sink the arena, $12 million was spent to excavate 31,500 cubic yards (24,100 m^{3}) of dirt over four months, which was the largest excavation in Houston history. Concrete was poured for the foundation throughout the summer of 2002, and structural work began in October. The roof was set on in December, as work continued inside, with a peak workforce of 650. In September 2003, a ribbon-cutting ceremony was held to mark the official opening of the arena. The total cost of construction was $235 million, with the city paying $182 million, and the Rockets adding $43 million for additions and enhancements.

== Arena interior ==
The arena can seat 18,104 for a basketball game, 17,800 for ice hockey games, and 19,300 for concerts. The prices for courtside seats to a Rockets game in the new arena were raised by as much as 50% compared to prices in the team's old home, while upper-deck seat prices were lowered.

It has 103 luxury suites and 2,900 club seats (Sections 105–109, Frost Bank West Club; Sections 118–122, Frost Bank East Club). The Rockets East & West Clubs feature upscale concessions, extra wide seats, full private bar featuring premium wine and beverage selections and concierge service. The adjacent 2,500-space Toyota Tundra garage is connected to the arena by a private skybridge that can be accessed by Suite, Court-side and Club Seat holders.

Additionally, the floor level features three separate private club lounges for access from court-side seat holders and floor seat concert goers. Lexus Lounge and Golden Nugget Club are on the west side of the floor level and the Bogarts Platinum Lounge is located on the east side of the floor level. All feature upscale amenities including multiple flat screen televisions, private bar, restrooms, and plush seating. The Lexus Lounge has its own pool tables and all three court-side lounges feature numerous private court-side suites.

Toyota Center also features the Sterling Vineyards Red & White Wine Bistro, located on the lower suites level on the south side of the arena.

Levy Restaurants manages concession services at the arena, and offers fast food on the main concourses, while also catering a VIP restaurant for Suite and Club Seat holders. Alexander personally chose colors for the restaurant to help customers feel "warm and comfortable", and Rockets president George Postolos said that the Rockets looked "for a relationship with the people that attend events in our venue". Originally, a 40 feet (12 m) by 32 feet (9.8 m) centerhung video system from Daktronics, which has four main replay screens and eight other full-color displays, hung from the ceiling of the arena, and had the highest-resolution display of any North American sports facility. In 2012, Toyota Center installed a larger, 4 panel scoreboard, similar to the one installed at AT&T Stadium, measuring 58 feet (18 m) by 25 feet (7.6 m) on the sidelines, and 25 feet (7.6 m) by 25 feet (7.6 m) on the ends, making it the largest such video board in an indoor arena. This larger scoreboard was installed by Panasonic and made its debut during the Houston Rockets 2012–13 season opener. The arena has two additional displays located at each end of the court, and a "state-of-the-art" audio system.

Another amenity new to Toyota Center in the 2012–2013 season is Wi-Fi. Designed by SignalShare and implemented by OfficeConnect.net, the Wi-Fi network is deployed throughout the arena and allows high-speed internet access during events. Its implementation was timed to be ready for the NBA All-Star Game.

=== Sponsorship ===
In July 2003, the arena was named Toyota Center. The logo of the company was placed on the roof of the building, as well in other prominent places inside the arena, and the company was given "a dominant presence" in commercials shown during broadcasts of games played in the arena.

=== Seating capacity ===
The seating capacity for basketball games has been as follows:

Years	Capacity
2003–2007	17,982
2007–2012	18,430
2012–2014	18,230
2014–2015	18,104
2015–present	18,055

== Events ==
The arena's first event was a Fleetwood Mac concert on October 6, 2003, and the first Rockets game at Toyota Center was against the Denver Nuggets on October 30.

=== Concerts ===
Many concerts have also taken place in Toyota Center, like Beyoncé, Prince, Lady Gaga, Tool, Duran Duran on their Astronaut tour, Janet Jackson, Madonna, Tina Turner, Red Hot Chili Peppers, Gloria Estefan, Shakira, Selena Gomez, Demi Lovato, Rihanna, Miley Cyrus, Bruno Mars, Christina Aguilera, P!nk, Andrea Bocelli, Muse, High School Musical The Concert, Aerosmith, Guns N' Roses, Coldplay, RBD, Laura Pausini, Alanis Morissette, Matchbox Twenty, Fiona Apple, Nickelback, Depeche Mode, Bon Jovi, Enrique Iglesias, Katy Perry, Drake, Travis Scott, Cher, Britney Spears, Kanye West and Jay-Z, Justin Bieber, Taylor Swift, The Rolling Stones, One Direction, Ariana Grande, Olivia Rodrigo, Carrie Underwood, Rammstein, Adele, Lana Del Rey, Melanie Martinez, Twenty One Pilots, Sabrina Carpenter, Blackpink, G-Dragon, Panic! At The Disco, Harry Styles, Enhypen, Garth Brooks with Trisha Yearwood, Phil Collins, Rosalía and many more.

On July 23, 2016, Hillsong UNITED performed in the arena, the performance was recorded and released as Empires.

=== Other sports ===
In 2007, 2011, 2013, 2015, 2017, 2020, 2021, 2022 and 2026, it played host to a UFC event.

Event	Date	Attendance
UFC 69: Shootout	Saturday, April 7, 2007	15,269
UFC 136: Edgar vs. Maynard III	Saturday, October 8, 2011	16,164
UFC 166: Velasquez vs. dos Santos III	Saturday, October 19, 2013	17,238
UFC 192: Cormier vs. Gustafsson	Saturday, October 3, 2015	14,622
UFC Fight Night: Bermudez vs. The Korean Zombie	Saturday, February 4, 2017	8,119
UFC 247: Jones vs. Reyes	Saturday, February 8, 2020	17,401
UFC 262: Oliveira vs. Chandler	Saturday, May 15, 2021	16,005
UFC 265: Lewis vs. Gane	Saturday, August 7, 2021	16,604
UFC 271: Adesanya vs. Whittaker 2	Saturday, February 12, 2022	17,872
UFC Fight Night: Strickland vs. Hernandez	Saturday, February 21, 2026	17,160

On August 21, 2010, it played host to Strikeforce: Houston.

The arena has hosted a number of WWE events including No Mercy in 2005, Vengeance: Night of Champions, the 2009 WWE Hall of Fame ceremony, two editions of TLC: Tables, Ladders & Chairs (2010 and 2013), Night of Champions 2015, NXT TakeOver: WarGames 2017, Survivor Series 2017, Elimination Chamber 2019, as well as various episodes of Raw and SmackDown. WWE also held their first live show in front of fans, for the first time since the onset of the COVID-19 pandemic, with the July 16, 2021, episode of SmackDown at Toyota Center. On December 30, 2024, the arena hosted the final episode of Raw on the USA Network.

=== Other events ===
On September 30, 2016, the arena hosted the Kellogg's Tour of Gymnastics Champions.

The arena will be the site of the 2028 Republican National Convention.

== Attendance records ==
The current attendance for a concert held at the arena was set on November 20, 2008, when Metallica played to a sold-out crowd of 17,962 during the Death Magnetic tour. The record for a basketball game is 18,583, set on March 26, 2010, when the Los Angeles Lakers defeated the Rockets 109–101.

== Awards and recognitions ==
The arena was the winner of the Allen Award for Civic Enhancement by Central Houston, the "Rookie of the Year" award by the Harlem Globetrotters, and a finalist for Pollstar Magazine's "Best New Concert Venue" award.

== See also ==
- List of sports venues with the name Toyota
- List of basketball arenas

Events and tenants
Preceded by Compaq Center	Home of the Houston Rockets; 2003 – present	Succeeded by current
Preceded by Compaq Center	Home of the Houston Aeros; 2003–2013	Succeeded by Wells Fargo Arena (as Iowa Wild)
Preceded by Compaq Center	Home of the Houston Comets; 2003–2007	Succeeded by Reliant Arena
Preceded by Pepsi Center; Amway Center	Host of the NBA All-Star Game; 2006; 2013	Succeeded by Thomas & Mack Center; New Orleans Arena
