= Hilton Koch =

American furniture store owner

Hilton Koch is the owner of Hilton Furniture, a retail store in Houston. Koch was the owner of the Houston Comets of the WNBA before they folded.

== Houston Comets ownership ==
Koch bought the Comets from Rockets owner Les Alexander in January 2007. Shortly after the purchase, team control was handed over to the WNBA. Hilton Koch sustained annual losses of over $4 million and was unable to keep the team competitive. The league shut the Comets team down entirely in December 2008.

== Late night television ads ==
In 2000, Conan O'Brien staged a competition on Late Night with Conan O'Brien between two of the show's advertisers, Jim McIngvale of Gallery Furniture and Koch. Hilton Furniture won the Late Night battle of the ads contest, and O'Brien brought Hilton to New York to appear on Late Night as well as for "an advertiser makeover" from Foote, Cone & Belding. During this remote, O'Brien met his future wife Liza Powel, who was a copywriter with FCB.

== Personal ==
Koch hails from the small town of Braithwaite, Louisiana near New Orleans. He attended Nicholls State University where he was president of Tau Kappa Epsilon fraternity.
