= Leslie Alexander (businessman) =

American lawyer

- Born: Leslie Lee Alexander; June 30, 1943 (age 83); New York City, U.S.
- Education: New York University (BS); Thomas Jefferson School of Law (JD)
- Occupations: Businessman; Investor; Attorney
- Known for: Former owner of the Houston Rockets
- Political party: Democratic
- Spouse: Nanci Shnapier (divorced)
- Children: 1

Leslie Lee Alexander (born June 30, 1943) is an American attorney, businessman and financier. He is a former bond trader from New York. He formerly owned the National Basketball Association (NBA) team Houston Rockets for 24 years, from 1993 to 2017.

== Early life ==
He was born in 1943, to a Jewish family in New York City. In 1965, he graduated from New York University with a bachelor's degree in economics. He dropped out of Brooklyn Law School after the death of his father, when he began working to support his mother. He later earned his juris doctor from the San Diego campus of Western State University College of Law, now known as Thomas Jefferson School of Law.

== Career ==
Alexander began his career as an attorney. From 1978 to 2009, he was a member of the California State Bar. His first job was trading options and bonds for the Wall Street firm, Lawrence Kotkin Associates. In 1980, he left to form his own investment company, The Alexander Group. As of 2008 he also owned an 18.5% stake in First Marblehead, a private student loan company.

In the July before the 1993-94 NBA season, Alexander bought the Houston Rockets for $85 million. The Rockets won the NBA championship the next two years: one in the '93-94 season and another in the '94-95 season. In 2008, he was listed by Forbes magazine as the best owner in the NBA.

In 1998, Alexander attempted to purchase and relocate the National Hockey League's Edmonton Oilers franchise, but a grassroots bid by local businessmen successfully prevented the sale.

From 1997 until early 2007, Alexander was the owner of the WNBA's Houston Comets. The Comets won the league's first 4 WNBA championships from 1997 to 2000. He sold the team to Hilton Koch in January 2007, one year before The Comets folded.

Leslie Alexander launched a joint-venture with the Chinese businessman Kenneth Huang (founder of Sportscorp in China), which invests in many companies in Asia. In 2006, a group of investors led by Kenneth Huang bought a minority share in the Rockets from Leslie Alexander.

On July 17, 2017, it was announced that the Rockets were for sale. On September 5, 2017, he reached an agreement to sell the Rockets to fellow Texas businessman Tilman Fertitta, pending league approval, for a worldwide professional sports record of $2.2 billion. Before his departure, Alexander gave the Rockets' General Manager, Daryl Morey, a new contract and extended player James Harden's contract with a record-breaking $228 million, 4-year deal that will last until the end of the 2022-23 NBA season. He also retained the two Larry O'Brien Championship Trophies won by the team in 1993–94 and 1994–95 as mementos of his ownership, and the team commissioned replica trophy replacements for the team upon its sale.

== Real estate ==
He owns a vineyard on Long Island and the related company Leslie Wine, launched in 2008. He also has a residence in Houston.

In March 2019, he put up for sale a $3.7 million French manor-style house in Houston.

== Personal life ==
Alexander divorced his wife Nanci (née Shnapier) in 2003, paying a $150 million settlement. They have one child and two grandchildren.

Alexander was raised Jewish but identifies as Agnostic. He is a supporter of the Democratic Party and has donated $15,000 in the past 20 years to Democratic candidates. He purchased the duplex penthouse of 18 Gramercy Park in 2012, reportedly for $42 million.

Forbes estimated Alexander's net worth was approximately $1.9 billion in 2024, placing him at #1710 on the magazine's list of richest people in the United States.

On March 27, 2017, Alexander pledged $10 million to 20 Houston charities, including the Houston Area Women's Center, Houston Public Library Foundation, Healthcare for the Homeless – Houston, and Citizens for Animal Protection. He also pledged $10 million in relief efforts in wake of Hurricane Harvey, which ravaged the city in August 2017.

Alexander is a supporter of the Hampton Bays center which aims to rescue animals.

In 1998, he and his now ex-wife, Nanci Shnapier, were recognized as the largest individual donors to the People for the Ethical Treatment of Animals (PETA). He also supports a horse sanctuary in Middleburg, Virginia.

Sporting positions
Preceded by Charlie Thomas	Houston Rockets principal owner 1993–2017	Succeeded by Tilman Fertitta
