= Social Statics =

Book by Herbert Spencer

Social Statics, or The Conditions essential to Happiness specified, and the First of them Developed
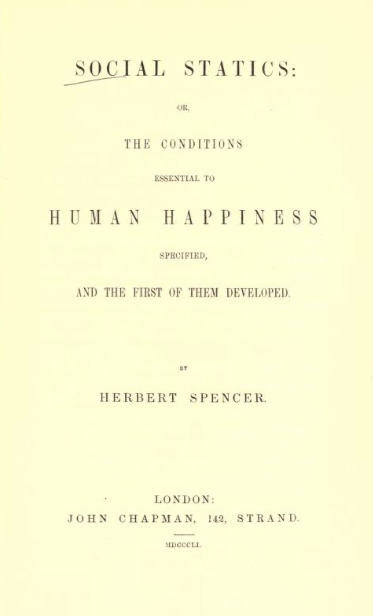
- Title page for Social Statics, or The Conditions essential to Happiness specified, and the First of them Developed (1851)
- Author: Herbert Spencer
- Language: English
- Publisher: John Chapman
- Publication date: 1851
- Publication place: United Kingdom

Social Statics, or The Conditions essential to Happiness specified, and the First of them Developed is an 1851 book by the British polymath Herbert Spencer. The book was published by John Chapman of London.

In the book, he uses the term "fitness" in applying his ideas of Lamarckian evolution to society, saying for example that "It is clear that any being whose constitution is to be moulded into fitness for new conditions of existence must be placed under those conditions. Or, putting the proposition specifically—it is clear that man can become adapted to the social state, only by being retained in the social state. This granted, it follows that as man has been, and is still, deficient in those feelings which, by dictating just conduct, prevent the perpetual antagonism of individuals and their consequent disunion, some artificial agency is required by which their union may be maintained. Only by the process of adaptation itself can be produced that character which makes social equilibrium spontaneous."

Despite its commonly being attributed to this book, it was not until his Principles of Biology of 1864 that Spencer coined the phrase "survival of the fittest", which he would later apply to economics and biology. This could be described as a key tenet of so-called Social Darwinism, though Spencer and his book were not an advocate thereof.

== Reaction ==
Economist Murray Rothbard called Social Statics "the greatest single work of libertarian political philosophy ever written."

In Lochner v. New York, Justice Oliver Wendell Holmes Jr., dissenting from the Supreme Court's holding that state legislation forbidding bakers from working more than ten hours a day or sixty hours a week violated the Due Process Clause of the Fourteenth Amendment to the United States Constitution by infringing on the individual's liberty of contract, famously wrote: "The Fourteenth Amendment does not enact Mr. Herbert Spencer's Social Statics."

Antoinette Brown Blackwell is critical of Spencers work. Writing in The Sexes Throughout Nature that "he became so intent on evolving a system that women's place in nature fell out of perspective in his thoughts. The subject must have seemed of too little importance to require long and laborious investigation "
