= Rush–Henrietta Ninth Grade Academy =

Rush–Henrietta Webster Learning Center

Location
- 2000 Lehigh Station Road; Henrietta, New York; USA
- 43°3′39.2″N 77°35′45.1″W

Information
- Type: Public high school
- Motto: Guiding Student Success
- Established: 1960 (2000 for use of Ninth Grade Academy, 2017 for Webster Learning Center)
- School district: Rush–Henrietta Central School District
- Grades: 9
- Enrollment: Between 400–500 Students (~20–25 a class)
- Campus: Public
- Colors: Green, Gold, and Black
- Mascot: Royal Comets (Lion Mascot)
- Yearbook: Club made
- Website: http://www.rhnet.org/ninthgrade_academy.cfm?subpage=61

The Webster Learning Center is a public high school located in the town of Henrietta, New York. It is part of the Rush–Henrietta Central School District, housing special needs, and special education students. It is sometimes referred to as "R-H Alternative High School." It houses students grades 9 to 12, from Charles H. Roth junior high school, Henry V. Burger junior high, and James E. Sperry Senior High School. The building is known as the Carlton Webster Building.

The Rush–Henrietta Central School District created the Ninth Grade Academy in 2000 in order to alleviate problems regarding over-crowding at Rush–Henrietta Senior High School, which had hosted grades 9 through 12. The Senior High now hosts grades 10-12, and as of 2017, the Webster Building serves as an alternative high school, with the junior high schools serving grades 7-9.

== School day structure ==
The building is broken into two large groups of students; East and West. Corresponding to the specific side of the school a student is assigned to, are the teachers that a student reports to. The school day schedule is broken down into four 80 minute instructional periods or blocks, of which students report to classes. The lunch periods, each 40 minutes long, are broken into East students and West students, placed during the late morning hours. Some students still switch lunches daily to alleviate congestion for lunch periods. At the end of the school day, at approximately 2:00 pm, students report to their homerooms in which homework and getting extra help is encouraged. The official end of the school day is at 2:35 pm. The school also employs 2 security guards to monitor the hallways during the 4 minute passing periods.

== Busing ==
Since the Senior High School building ends their school day at 2:45 pm, administration has decided to have all of the regular end of the day buses stand by at the end of the day at the Ninth Grade Academy. As the students start boarding the buses, they begin to shuttle the students to the Senior High School building, in which Ninth Grade Academy students can then transfer to their bus that takes them to their residence/destination. By 2:45 pm, most buses are waiting at the Senior High School building, of which are then boarded by the students of the Senior High School building. By approximately 2:55 pm, the buses depart the school and go through their runs.

A similar pattern is followed with the late bus schedule, which departs the Ninth Grade Academy at approximately 3:30, and departs the Senior High School at approximately 3:45.
