= Fletcher Steele =

American architect (1885–1971)

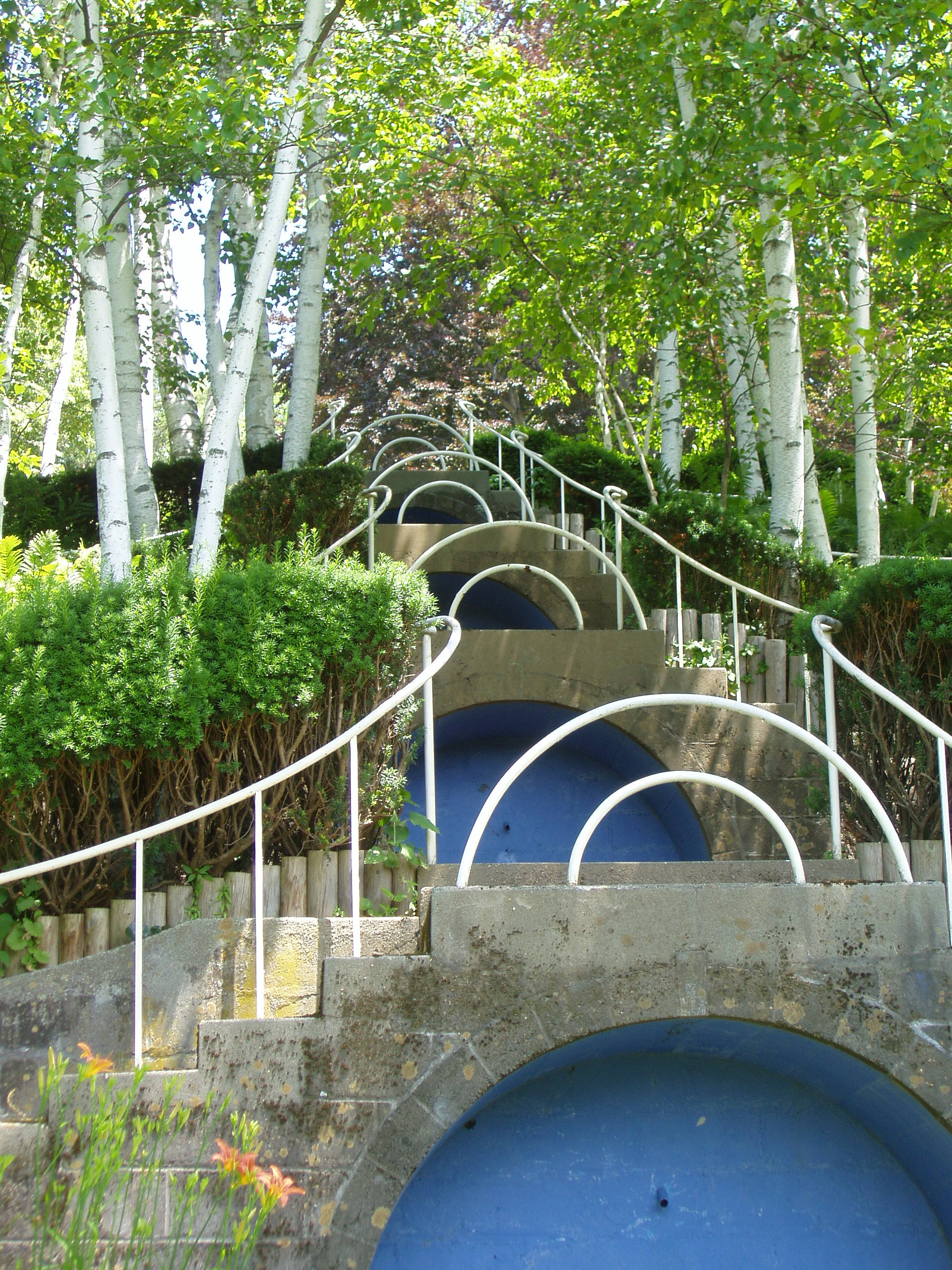
Blue Steps, Naumkeag.

John Fletcher Steele (June 7, 1885 – July 16, 1971) was an American landscape architect credited with designing and creating over 700 gardens from 1915 to the time of his death.

== Early life ==
Steele was born in Rochester, New York, United States to a lawyer father and pianist mother. He graduated with a B.A. from Williams College in 1907. While there, he was a member of the fraternity of Delta Psi (St. Anthony Hall). He then enrolled in the young landscape architecture program at Harvard University where Frederick Law Olmsted Jr. was one of his professors. In 1908 Steele left Harvard to accept an apprenticeship with Warren H. Manning.

== Career ==
In 1913 Steele embarked on a four-month tour of Europe to study European designs. Upon his return to America, he opened his own practice. His early garden plans are generally in the English Arts and crafts style of Gertrude Jekyll, Reginald Blomfield, and T. H. Mawson, but ornamented with Italianate detailing such as balustrades, hedges, urns, statuary, stone pineapples, and flights of water steps. During World War I, Steele served in the American Red Cross in Europe. After war's end he regularly returned in summers.

His conversion to an Art Deco style began in 1925 when he visited the Exposition Internationale des Arts Décoratifs et Industriels Modernes (the 'Art Deco Exposition') and saw its examples of cubist gardens with mirrors, concrete and coloured gravel. By 1930 Steele was writing with enthusiasm of André Vera, Tony Garnier (architect), and Gabriel Guevrekian.

Steele's designs and writings of this period were influential during the stylistic transition from Art Deco to Modernism. He helped shape Modernism through younger design students at Harvard, notably Dan Kiley, Garrett Eckbo, and James C. Rose, to who Steele showed the possibilities of modern art and the creativity inherent within the design process. Kiley later wrote that "Steele was the only good designer working during the twenties and thirties, also the only one who was really interested in new things." Eckbo noted that "Fletcher Steele was the transitional figure between the old guard and the moderns. He interests me because he was an experimenter." Steele's own designs, however, were sufficiently removed from the Modern style so that his works were generally out of fashion until the modern era had passed.

Steele was based in Boston for more than 50 years. In pursuit of his career he traveled by train extensively in the United States. Toward the end of his life, he lived in Pittsford, New York. The local library there has a Fletcher Steele Room and books on display from his private collection.

Steele is interred in the Mount Hope Cemetery in Rochester, New York. His papers are archived in the Library of Congress, the Rochester Historical Society and in the Franklin Moon Library, State University of New York College of Environmental Science and Forestry, Syracuse, New York. Images from the Steele manuscript collection can be found in the SUNY D-Space digital repository.

== Projects ==
Steele is noted for a number of major works including Naumkeag, Peters Reservation, Ancrum House, Whitney Allen House, Standish Backus House, Elihu Kirby House, Lisburne Grange. His most famous work by far is Naumkeag.

These projects were not all viewed with high regard at the time, and only relatively recently have historians begun to appreciate Steele's impact on garden design and landscape architecture.

According to Robin Karson's 1991 book about Steele's life and his landscape architecture, the only two of his gardens that remain in existence (as originally created) are at Naumkeag and at the Whitney Allen House. However, Melissa McGrain, with the support of her husband Andrew Stern, bought the estate containing Nancy and Richard Turner's house in Pittsford, New York and did excellent work in restoring the garden that Steele designed and developed for the Turners.

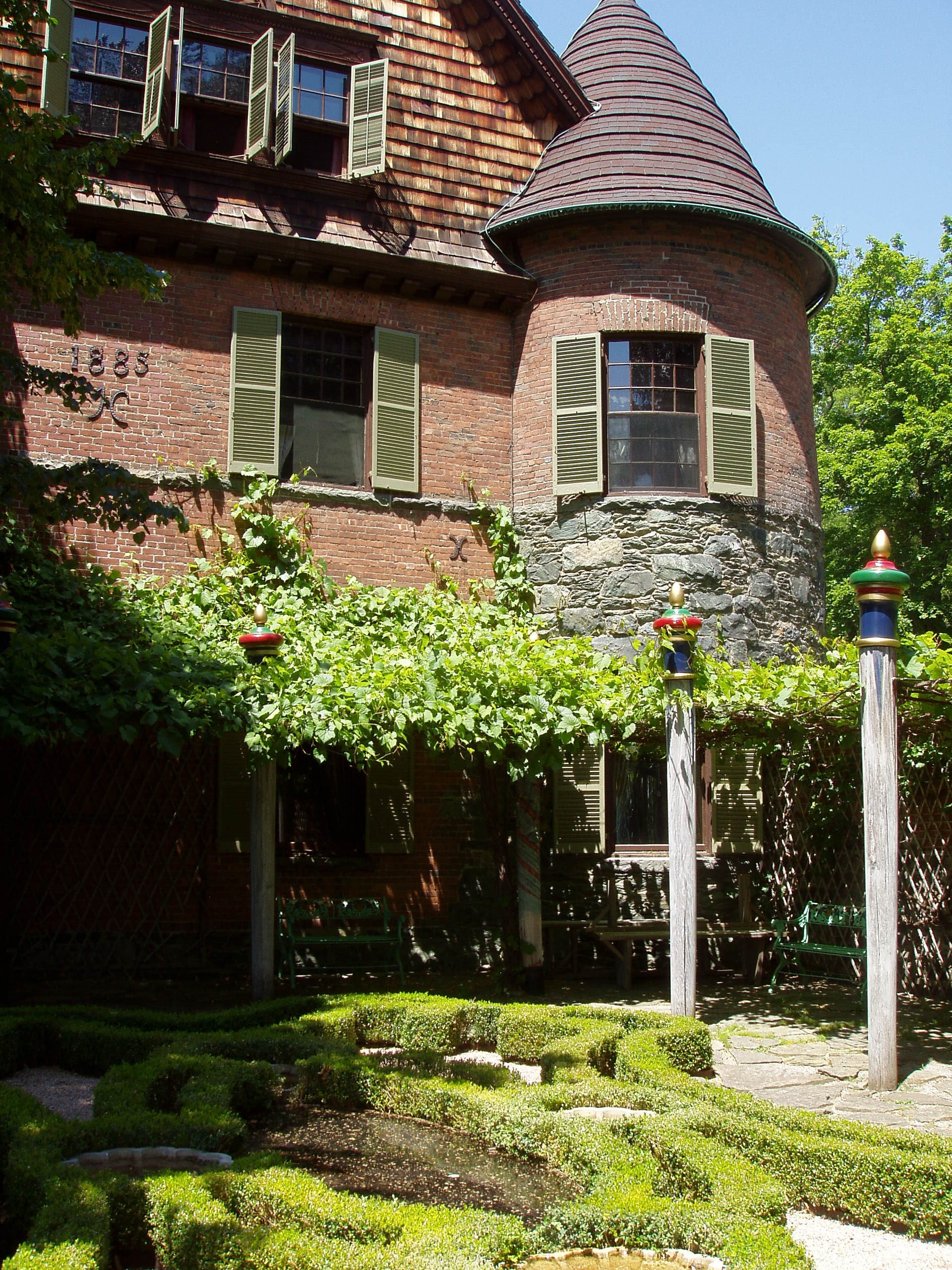
Afternoon Garden, Naumkeag

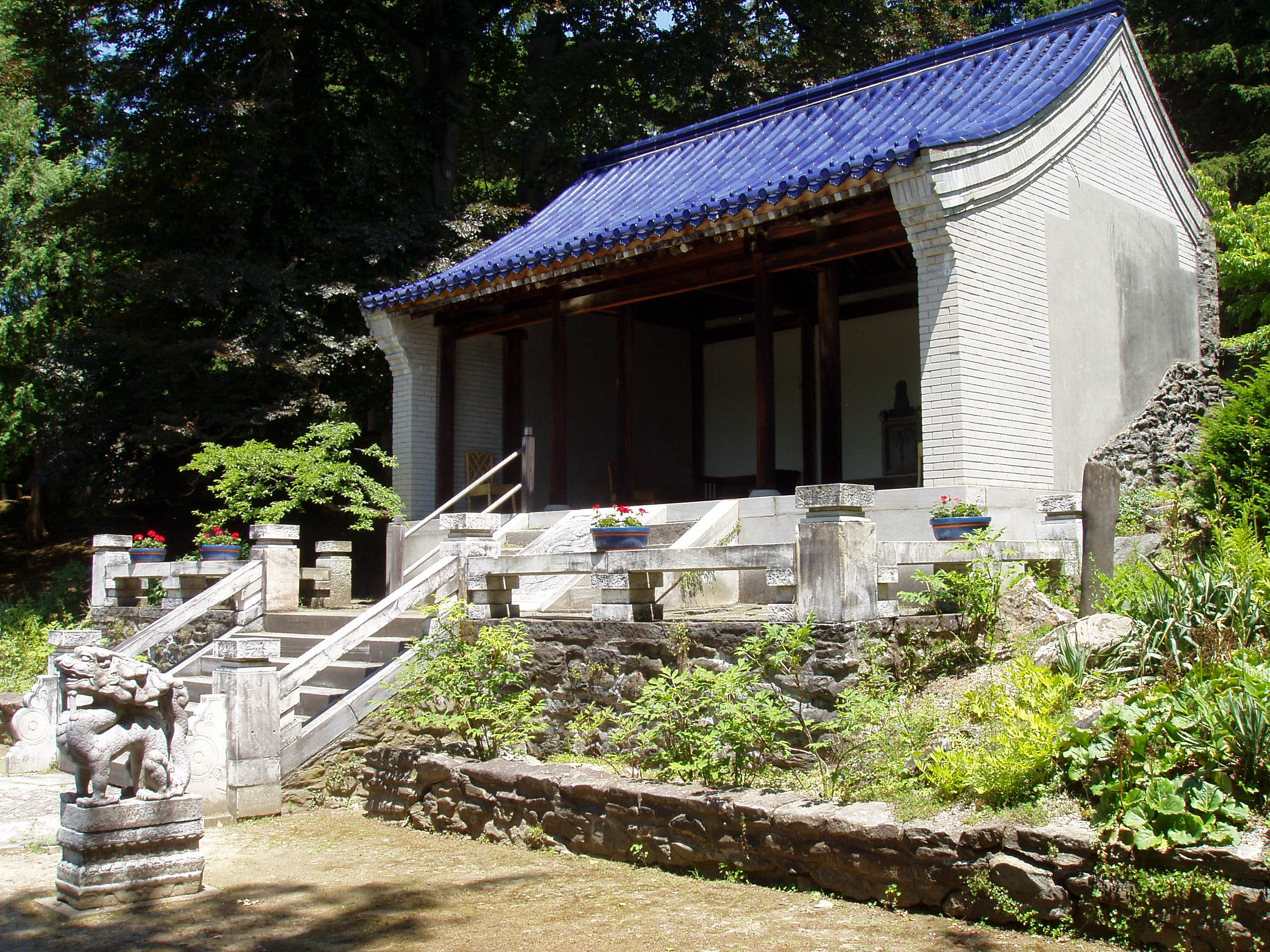
Chinese Garden, Naumkeag

== Selected writing ==
- Design in the little garden, Boston, The Atlantic Monthly Press, 1924. LCCN 24-5820
- The House beautiful gardening manual; a comprehensive guide, æsthetic and practical, for all garden lovers, both those who are still planning their gardens on paper and those who have had gardening experience, including plant lists compiled with the help of horticulturalists in all sections of the country, and an introductory chapter on garden design by Fletcher Steele, Boston, The Atlantic monthly press, 1926. LCCN 27-806
- Gardens and people, Boston, Houghton Mifflin, 1964. LCCN 64-10265
  - 2011 pbk edition; with an introduction by Robin Karson LCCN 2011-15000 ISBN 9781558499072

== External links and sources ==
- The Fletcher Steele Archives at the SUNY College of Environmental Science and Forestry
- www.gardenvisit.com
- GoldsmithBirdhouses.com Birdhouse reproduction from Fletcher Steele design
- Fletcher Steele at Naumkeag An online film on Fletcher Steele's designs at Naumkeag in Stockbridge, Massachusetts
- Fletcher J. Steele Papers at Williams College Archives & Special Collections
