= Elihu Kirby House =

Coordinates: 43°04′59″N 77°33′01″W

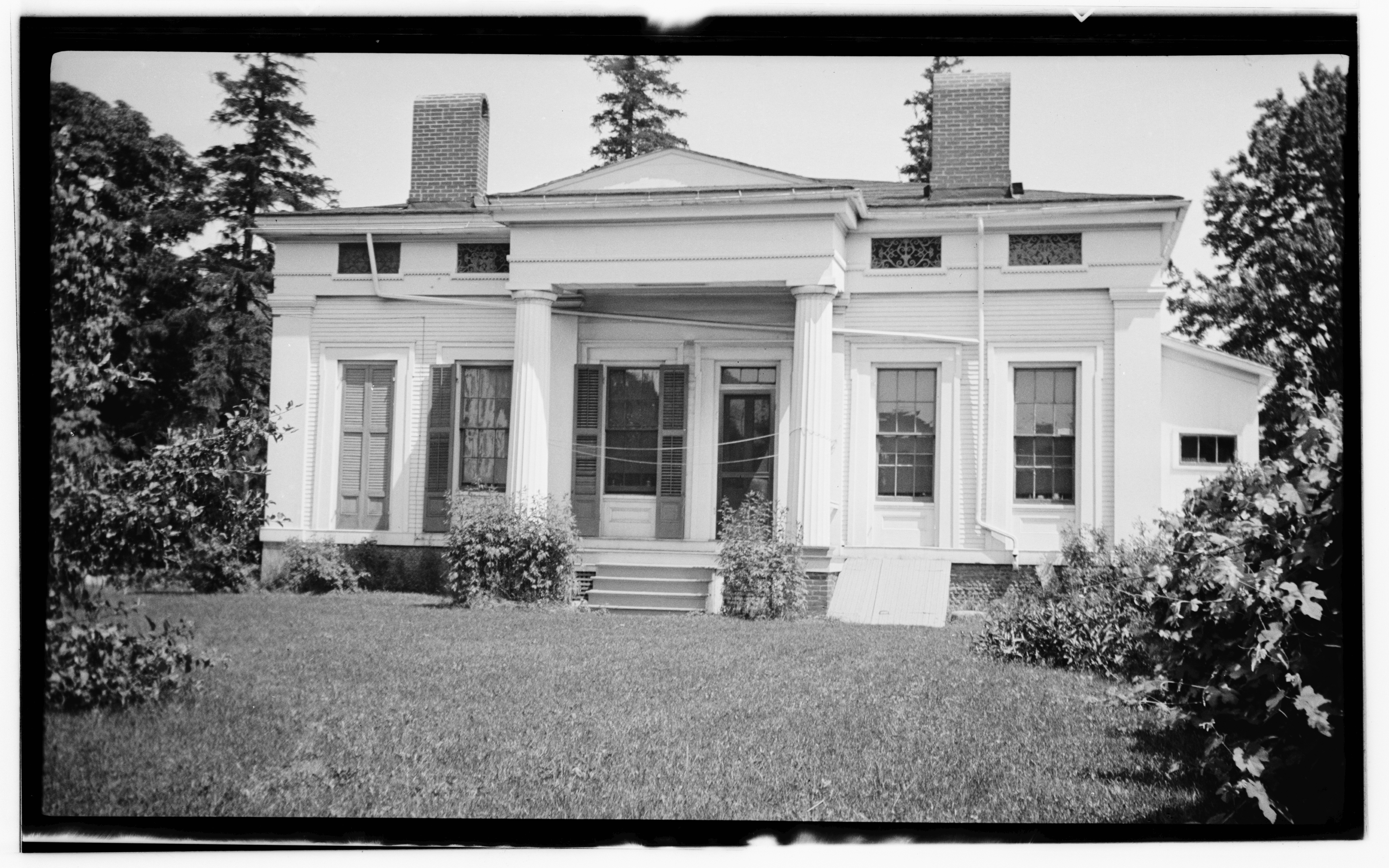
The Kirby House photographed in 1935 before its relocation.

The Elihu Kirby House, also known as the Turner House, is a Greek Revival house in Pittsford, Monroe County, New York. It was built around 1840 in Henrietta, New York. Richard and Nancy Turner bought the house in 1956 and paid for moving the house from Henrietta to a nearby location in Pittsford. The house is located on an estate of 6 acres (2.428 hectares) with a garden, designed and developed in the 1960s by the famous landscape architect Fletcher Steele. The garden was Steele's last major landscaping project.

== Construction and ownership by Elihu Kirby ==
At the age of nineteen, Elihu Kirby (1801–1866) came to Henrietta, New York, and by his late twenties became a success in general merchandising. His imposing house was completed by the early 1840s and he lived there until his death. After his death, his family sold the house.

== Relocation to Pittsford ==
In the early 1950s Richard and Nancy Turner settled in Rochester, New York. The couple, interested in historical preservation, bought the Elihu Kirby House and in 1956 decided that area near the historic house was becoming too commercialized. Therefore, they hired a Weedsport company to move the structure to a vacant lot they owned in Pittsford. (The vacant lot purchased by the Turners was selected by the landscape architect Katherine Wilson Rahn (1915–1992), a Fellow of the American Society of Landscape Architects. A barren cornfield and an abandoned quarry occupied the vacant lot.) The company's workers cut the structure into two sections, each weighing roughly 40 tons. The two section were transported by two trailers to the new location, which was about 3½ miles (5.63 km) away from the old location. The transportation took 10 days, because power lines had to be avoided, the load weight was too much for some roads, and the two trailers had to be pulled over some roadless land. The transportation gained some press coverage, especially when one of the structure-hauling trailers became mired in the mud of a cornfield and when one power line was severed. The downed power line caused some baseball fans to lose their television coverage of a World Series game. However, the transportation was a success, and the two structural sections were successfully rejoined.

== Landscaping ==
In the 1960s the Turners hired Fletcher Steele, who was living in Pittsford, to design a garden for the grounds of the relocated house. Most of the garden's original development occurred from 1964 to 1968.

For the Kirby House in 1963, the landscape architect Katherine Wilson Rahn designed and supervised the creation a long, straight drive bordered by sugar maples. The drive leads to a forecourt with a circular turnaround. In 1964 Richard L. Turner commissioned Steele to design a garden for the 6-acre estate. Steele provided a bilaterally symmetrical plan inspired by the gardens of the Châteaux de Vaux-le-Vicomte, the Château de Sceaux, and the Palace of Versailles. Steele's design balanced geometric formality with an extraordinary variety of plant species. The garden's North Vista has a large outdoor room set amid towering trees, mid-sized flowering trees including hawthorn (Crataegus, dogwood (Cornus), and shadblow {Amelanchier), and shrubbery including vintage rose bushes. The culmination of the North Vista is a circular reflecting pool surrounded by a semicircle of towering cedar trees. However, at the time of Steele's death in 1971, several areas of the 6-acre estate had not been landscaped. Although she respected Steele's design, Nancy Turner commissioned an indoor swimming pool, where she swam each morning. She also commissioned a birch-tree allée in an undeveloped section of the property. The allée was designed by the Rochester-based landscape architect Carolyn Marsh Lindsay (b. 1932), who was in 1989–1990 the president of the American Horticultural Society.

In 2001 Melissa McGrain and her husband Andrew Stern moved to Pittsford and purchased the Kirby House. They constructed a new garage, connected to the house by a glaased-in walkway, and transformed the Turners' former garage (originally, the carriage house) into a guesthouse for overnight visitors. After a few years, Melissa McGrain focused her attention on the garden. She studied Steele's original plans and plant lists, established a team of gardeners, and supervised restorative work on the garden's North Vista. She added a six-foot deep koi pool, with sluiceway and a waterfall, to the site of the Turners' former vegetable garden. She also added some monumental bronze passenger pigeons bordering on Steele's reflecting pool. The bronzes were the work of her brother, the artist Todd McGrain.

Melissa McGrain became a pen pal of Nancy Turner, who supplied valuable advice and interesting knowledge about Steele and the Turners' garden. Nancy Turner was also a valuable source of advice and knowledge for Robin Karson, the author of the 2003 book Fletcher Steele, Landscape Architect: An Account of the Gardenmaker's Life, 1885-1971.

Nancy Turner was a member of the Allyn's Creek Garden Club, which in 1937 became a chapter of the Garden Club of America (GCA). In 1982, the GCA honored both Nancy and Richard Turner by awarding them the Mrs. Oakley Thorne Medal for "outstanding garden design in which they have created a magnificen harmony of house to garden" in their implementation of Fletcher Steele's garden design. Nancy Turner served a term as GCA vice-president.
