= Whitney Allen House =

Historic house in Rochester, New York

- Interactive map of Whitney Allen House

General information
- Location: 32 Oliver St, Rochester, NY, USA 14607, Rochester, New York, United States
- Coordinates: 43°09′02″N 77°34′22″W
- Current tenants: Civic Music Association
- Year built: 1914–1915

The Whitney Allen House is a historic house, located at 32 Oliver Street in Rochester, New York.

== Historical background ==
Atkinson Allen (1886–1957) married Charlotte Whitney (1891–1978) in September 1914. Their childless marriage ended in a Mexican divorce in 1934. Both were born into wealthy families with high society status. Atkinson Allen was vice-president of the Allen Woolen Mills. Charlotte Whitney Allen was the daughter of Warham Whitney and his wife, the former Fanny Palmer Arnot, who belonged to one of Elmira's wealthiest and most socially prestigious families. Their daughter Charlotte was independent, rebellious, and interested in music, art, promoting social progress, and stimulating conversation. She was expelled, for rejecting chaperonage, from the Spence School for Girls and expelled, for smoking a cigarette, from Rochester's Century Club, of which her own mother was the president. Charlotte and her best friend Clara "Clayla" Ward née Werner started their own club — the Corner Club — in Rochester. It was located at 18 Grove Place, where Grove Place intersected Windsor Street, in a house owned by the family into which Clara Louise Werner Ward had recently married. Many of Rochester's social elite would gather to drink, dine, and talk at the Corner Club.

== History ==
=== Construction and inhabitation (1914–1964) ===
The house was constructed in 1914–1915 as a wedding gift from the parents of Charlotte Whitney Allen to her and her husband.

Warham Whitney and his wife funded the Whitney Allen House, completed in 1915, on a lot which was 90 feet (27.43 meters) by 200 feet (60.96 meters). In 1916 Fletcher Steele submitted his design for a compact, walled garden — construction on the garden with its figurative statues continued for half a century. Charlotte Whitney Allen made all of the important funding decisions for the garden and had an idiosyncratic loathing of flowers in terms of garden aesthetics. In a letter to Steele, she wrote, "I believe that the secret of the most beautiful gardens in the world—such creations as Villa d'Este, Caprarola, and the Villa Lante in Italy, or the Generalife in Spain—is that they show as few flowers as possible ...".

Charlotte did not inherit her full share of the Arnot family trust until her mother died in 1936, and Steele charged high prices for his time and talent. The garden had a raised terrace with a hidden allée which was interrupted at intervals by marble vases. At the end of the garden lawn, there was a swimming pool, into which a clamshell fountain spilled water. According to Robin Karson, important additions to the garden were made in 1926, 1934, and 1938, respectively representing Steele's interest in "modernism, eclecticism, and exoticism." In 1937 Steele completed his design for a chain-mail, tent-like structure near the swimming pool. The structure somewhat resembled a tent from an Ottoman military campaign. Steele called the structure the "swimming pool shelter" but Charlotte Whitney Allen called it "the drinking pit."

The house is noteworthy for at least 3 reasons: (1) The garden eventually established there is one of Fletcher Steele's masterpieces. (2) The garden once contained a sculpture by Gaston Lachaise — on a 1926 commission, he sculpted a nude, in the heroic style, installed in a roofed niche on the garden's terrace. (3) In 1935 Alexander Calder constructed a mobile for the garden — the mobile was the first sculpture created by Calder for out-of-doors display.

The garage of the Whitney Allen House once sheltered a Ford-Cunningham Town Car, which Charlotte Whitney Allen purchased in 1936. In that year, only 37 such automobiles were manufactured. She was regularly chauffeured in the town car until 1964.

=== As a historic house (1964–present) ===
In 1964 Charlotte Whitney Allen donated the property at 32 Oliver Street to the University of Rochester's Memorial Art Gallery (MAG) and expressed the wish that the house should become the permanent residence of MAG's Director. However, the pictures and sculptures were removed to University Avenue, Rochester, and the house with its garden was sold.

As of the end of the year 2023, the Whitney Allen House in Rochester, Monroe County, New York is not listed in the National Register of Historic Places.
