= Shenise Johnson =

American basketball player (born 1990)

Personal information
- Born: December 8, 1990 (age 35) Rochester, New York, U.S.
- Listed height: 5 ft 11 in (1.80 m)
- Listed weight: 168 lb (76 kg)

Career information
- High school: Rush–Henrietta (Henrietta, New York)
- College: Miami (Florida) (2008–2012)
- WNBA draft: 2012: 1st round, 5th overall pick
- Drafted by: San Antonio Silver Stars
- Playing career: 2012–present
- Position: Point guard / shooting guard
- Number: 42

Career history
- 2012–2014: San Antonio Stars
- 2015–2019: Indiana Fever
- 2020: Minnesota Lynx

Career highlights
- 2× All-American – State Farm/WBCA Coaches', USBWA (2011, 2012); Second-team All-American – AP (2012); Third-team All-American – AP (2011); ACC Player of the Year (2011); 3× First-team All-ACC (2010–2012); 3× ACC All-Defensive Team (2010–2012); ACC All-Freshman Team (2009); McDonald's All-American (2008); Miss New York Basketball (2008)
- Stats at WNBA.com
- Stats at Basketball Reference

Shenise Johnson (born December 8, 1990) is an American basketball player. She was born in Rochester, New York, Johnson went to Rush–Henrietta Senior High School in Henrietta and played college basketball for the Miami Hurricanes at the University of Miami. She was drafted by the San Antonio Stars with the fifth overall pick of the 2012 WNBA draft.

== USA Basketball ==
Johnson was named to the USA Women's U19 team which represented the US in the 2009 U19 World's Championship, held in Bangkok, Thailand in July and August 2009. Although the USA team lost the opening game to Spain, they went on to win their next seven games to earn a rematch against Spain in the finals, and won the game 81–71 to earn the gold medal. Johnson scored 9.4 points per game and led the team in steals, with 18.

== WNBA ==
Johnson was selected in the first round of the 2012 WNBA draft (fifth overall) by the San Antonio Silver Stars.

On March 12, 2015, the San Antonio Stars traded Johnson and their second round draft pick in the 2015 WNBA draft to the Indiana Fever in exchange for the Fever's first and third round draft picks in the 2015 draft.

== Career statistics ==
=== College ===
Legend
GP	Games played	GS	Games started	MPG	Minutes per game	RPG	Rebounds per game
APG	Assists per game	SPG	Steals per game	BPG	Blocks per game	PPG	Points per game
TO	Turnovers per game	FG%	Field-goal percentage	3P%	3-point field-goal percentage	FT%	Free-throw percentage
**Bold**	Career best	°	League leader

Year	Team	GP	Points	FG%	3P%	FT%	RPG	APG	SPG	BPG	PPG
2008–09	Miami (Florida)	30	384	38.5	32.3	82.0	7.1	4.1	2.6	**1.0**	12.8
2009–10	Miami (Florida)	**36**	**685**	**49.6**	**39.4**	77.3	7.7	**4.6**	3.1	0.6	19.0
2010–11	Miami (Florida)	33	648	48.8	34.9	84.6	**8.3**	3.8	3.2	0.8	**19.6**
2011–12	Miami (Florida)	32	545	45.2	29.8	**87.7**	8.0	4.4	**3.4**	0.4	17.0
Career	Miami (Florida)	131	2262	46.0	34.5	82.5	7.8	4.2	3.1	0.7	17.3

=== WNBA ===
==== Regular season ====
Year	Team	GP	GS	MPG	FG%	3P%	FT%	RPG	APG	SPG	BPG	TO	PPG
2012	San Antonio	**34**	1	17.1	.364	.412	.854	3.9	1.4	0.8	0.2	1.1	5.6
2013	San Antonio	33	24	**27.3**	.395	.274	.791	3.9	2.4	1.3	0.2	1.8	11.0
2014	San Antonio	30	1	17.9	.400	.372	.829	3.3	1.4	1.0	0.1	1.1	6.0
2015	Indiana	31	**27**	26.2	**.467**	**.413**	.805	**4.9**	2.4	1.1	0.2	1.8	10.9
2016	Indiana	29	10	22.4	.410	.359	.938	3.5	2.1	1.2	**0.3**	1.7	9.8
2017	Indiana	14	13	24.9	.433	.333	**.950**	3.4	**2.5**	**1.5**	**0.3**	1.3	**11.3**
2019	Indiana	17	0	12.9	.333	.242	.938	2.1	1.1	0.7	0.1	0.7	4.9
2020	Minnesota	17	4	12.5	.341	.353	.893	1.9	1.2	0.9	0.1	1.2	5.1
Career	8 years, 3 teams	205	80	20.8	.403	.348	.861	3.6	1.8	1.1	0.2	1.4	8.2

==== Playoffs ====
Year	Team	GP	GS	MPG	FG%	3P%	FT%	RPG	APG	SPG	BPG	TO	PPG
2012	San Antonio	2	0	12.0	.333	.000	.000	3.0	1.0	0.5	0.0	0.5	3.0
2014	San Antonio	2	0	8.5	.125	.000	**1.000**	0.5	1.0	0.0	0.0	0.5	2.0
2015	Indiana	**11**	**11**	**30.5**	**.500**	**.286**	.933	**4.5**	**1.5**	0.7	**0.5**	1.2	**12.4**
2016	Indiana	1	0	22.0	.188	.000	**1.000**	4.0	1.0	**1.0**	0.0	2.0	8.0
2020	Minnesota	1	0	3.0	.000	.000	.000	0.0	0.0	0.0	0.0	0.0	0.0
Career	5 years, 3 teams	17	11	23.6	.432	.195	.947	3.6	1.2	0.6	0.3	1.0	9.1

== Filmography ==
2013 Grown Ups 2 as Monica Cubria

2014 Draft Day as Kate Mackey
