= Antoinette Louisa Brown Blackwell Childhood Home =

Historic house in New York, United States

- U.S. National Register of Historic Places
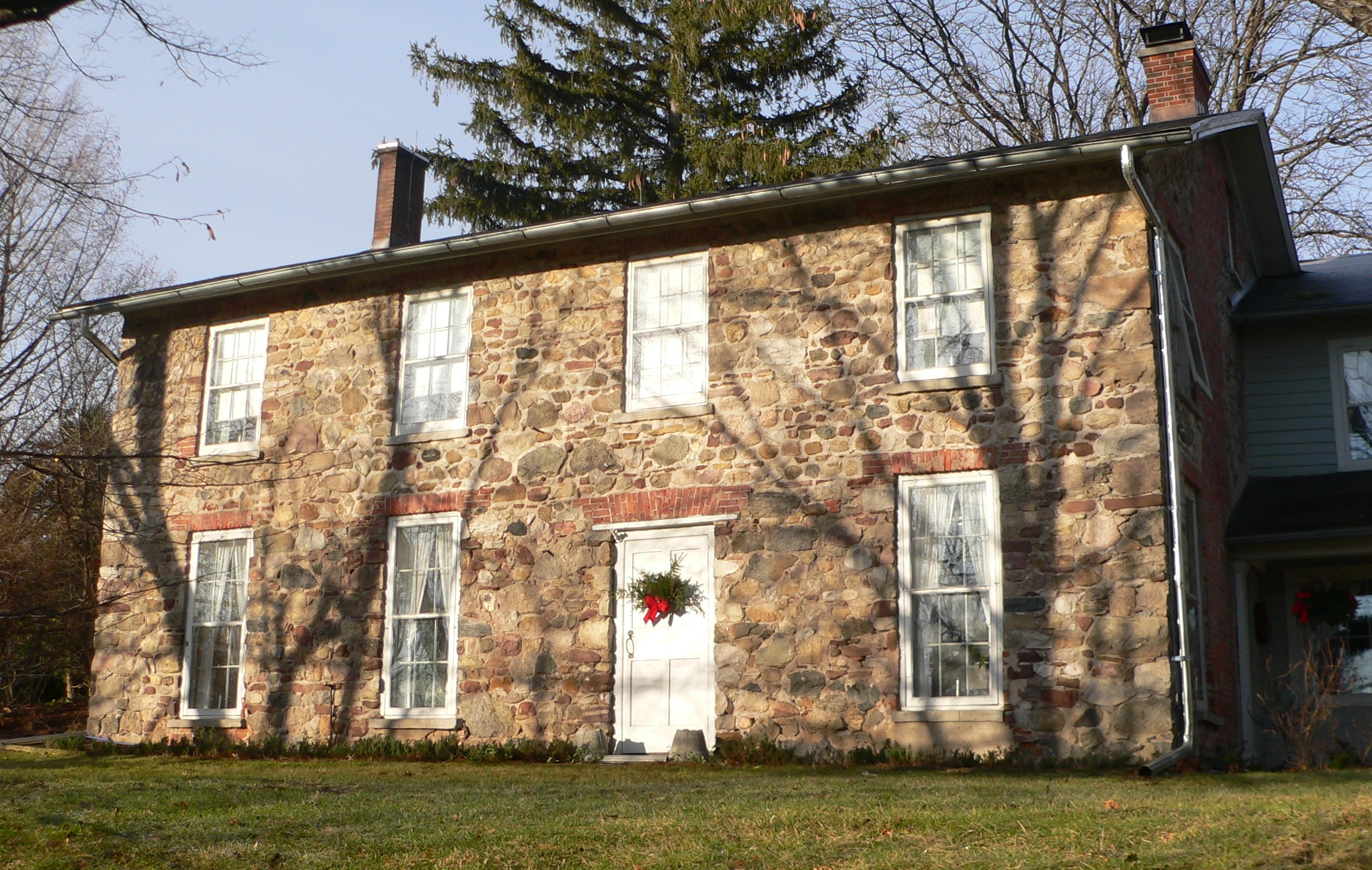
- View from Pinnacle Road

- Location within New York Location within the United States
- Location: 1099 Pinnacle Rd., Henrietta, New York
- Coordinates: 43°3′5″N 77°36′0″W
- Area: 11 acres (4.5 ha)
- Architectural style: Federal
- NRHP reference No.: 89002003
- Added to NRHP: November 16, 1989

The Antoinette Louisa Brown Blackwell Childhood Home is a historic home located at Henrietta in Monroe County, New York. It is a vernacular Federal style masonry residence constructed of random fieldstone with brick infill. It was built in 1830 as a 2 1/2-story side-gable-and-wing design and later modified and expanded. It is notable as the childhood residence of women's rights advocate Antoinette Brown Blackwell (1825–1921), who was the first woman to be ordained as a minister in the United States.

It was listed on the National Register of Historic Places in 1989.

== See also ==
- Votes For Women History Trail
- Timeline of women's suffrage
- Women's suffrage
- Women's suffrage in the United States
