= Tinker Cobblestone Farmstead =

Historic house in New York, United States

- U.S. National Register of Historic Places
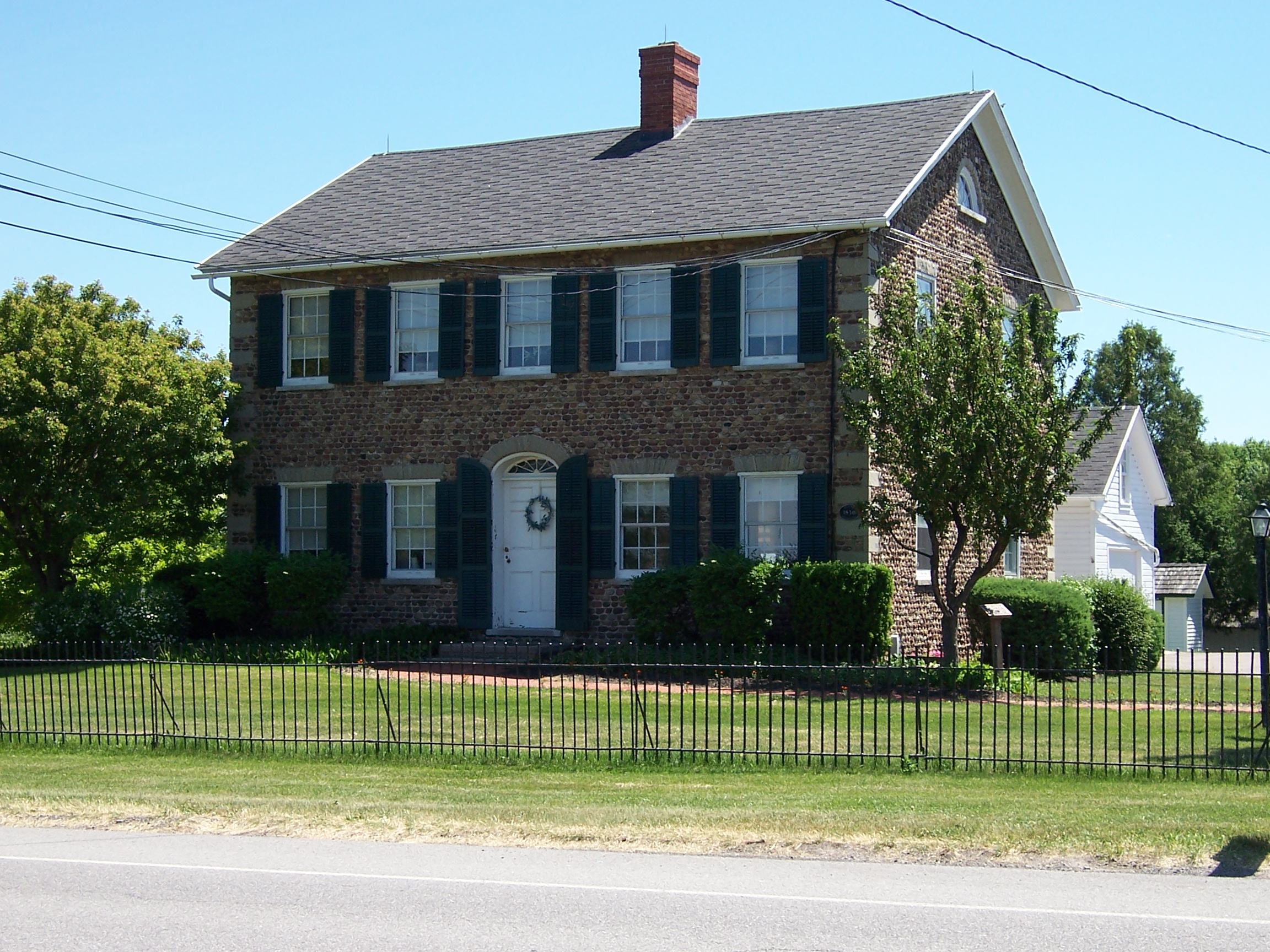
- The Tinker Homestead in May 2010

- Location within New York Location within the United States
- Location: 1585 Calkins Rd., Henrietta, New York
- Coordinates: 43°4′7.5″N 77°34′30.2″W
- Area: 63 acres (25 ha)
- Built: 1828–1830
- Architect: McCarty, Michael
- Architectural style: Federal
- MPS: Cobblestone Architecture of New York State MPS
- NRHP reference No.: 95000502
- Added to NRHP: April 27, 1995

Tinker Cobblestone Farmstead, also known as the Tinker Homestead and Farm Museum, is a historic home located at Henrietta in Monroe County, New York. It is a Federal style cobblestone farmhouse built between 1828 and 1830. It is constructed of medium-sized field cobbles and is one of 13 surviving cobblestone buildings in Henrietta.

Connecticut residents James and Rebecca Tinker arrived in Henrietta in 1812 with their six children (two more would be born later). Initially, they lived in log cabins that had been previously built on the site, but had their own home built starting in 1828, using the cobblestones they collected as they cleared the fields. Like many cobblestone structures in New York, it was constructed by masons whose work on the Erie Canal had recently ended and who needed work. Construction took two years.

The farm surrounding the home started small but at one point expanded to more than 200 acres. Five generations of the Tinkers' descendants lived in the home, until 1991. (Even after donating the home, the residents continued to live in a wooden addition in the rear of the main house until 2010.)

In 1991, the home and surrounding 68 acres (28 ha) were transferred to the Town of Henrietta. Much of the surrounding land is now the Tinker Nature Park, maintained by the town, with hiking trails and a nature center. The house now serves as a museum.

It was listed on the National Register of Historic Places in 1995. Among the architectural features are twin parlors and a spiral staircase.
