= Rush–Henrietta Senior High School =

Rush Henrietta Senior High School
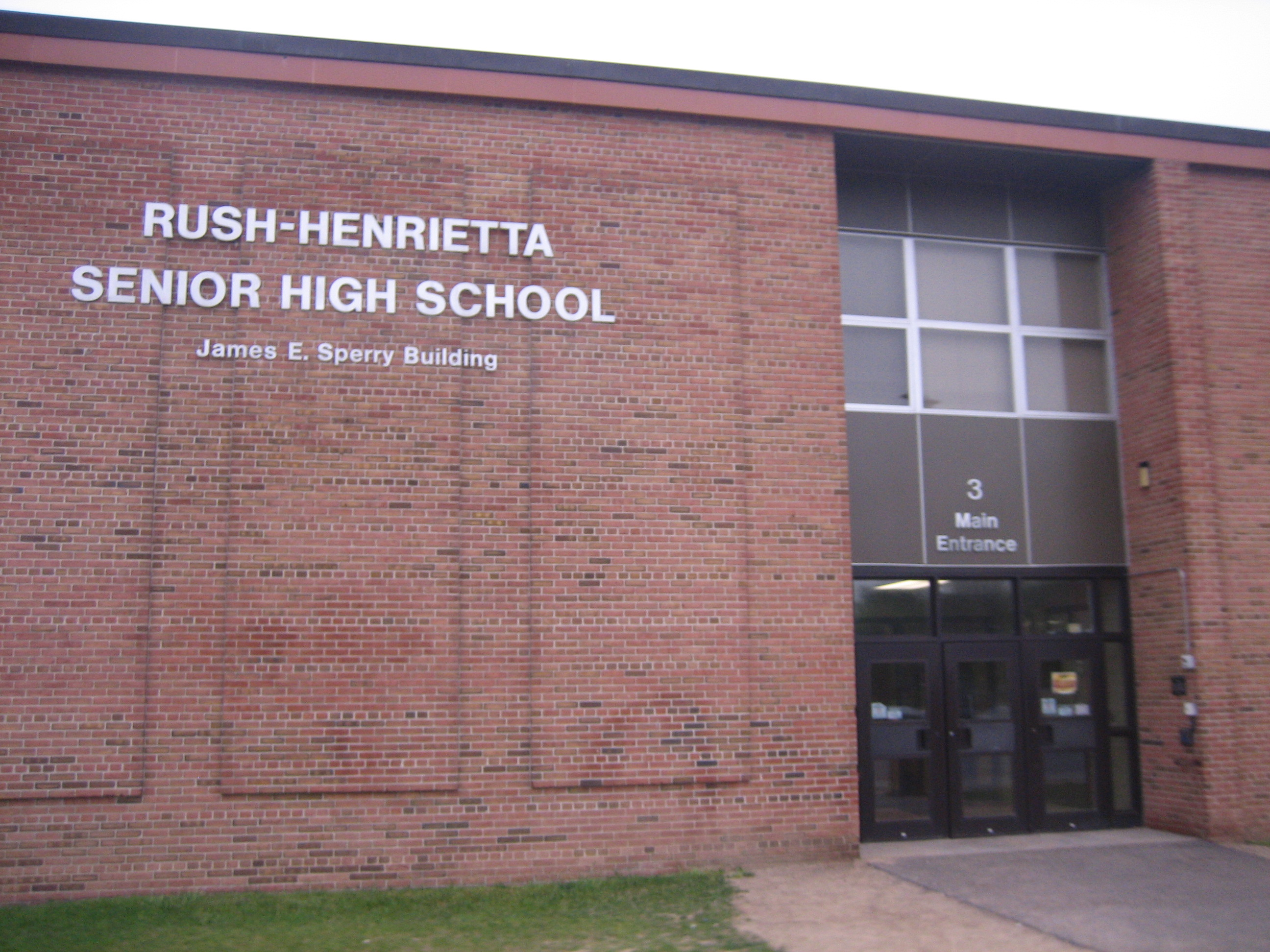

Location
- 1799 Lehigh Station Road; Henrietta, New York; United States; 43.05818°N 77.60688°W

Information
- Type: Public high school
- Motto: Guiding Student Success
- Established: 1969
- School district: Rush-Henrietta Central School District
- Principal: Dave Dunn (Interim)
- Teaching staff: 109.56 (FTE)
- Grades: 10-12
- Enrollment: 1,320 (2023–2024)
- Student to teacher ratio: 12.05
- Colors: Green, Gold, and Black
- Mascot: Royal Comets
- Website: https://shs.rhnet.org/

Rush–Henrietta Senior High School - James E. Sperry Building, located in Henrietta, New York, also referred to as Rush–Henrietta Senior High School, R-H and Sperry High School, is the only high school in the Rush-Henrietta Central School District. As of the 2023-24 school year, the principal is Arkee Allen.

Beginning with the class of 2004, students in the ninth grade in the Rush-Henrietta district began attending the Ninth Grade Academy (the Carlton Webster building). This move was made in response to an overcrowding of students at the Senior High building. The building is a short distance (0.5 miles [0.80 km]) from the high school. However, as of the 2017–18 school year, the Webster Building is now in use as an alternative high school, and ninth-graders attend one of the two junior high schools.

Rush-Henrietta has a strong athletic program with dozens of varsity teams. The school is known to be arch rivals with the Red Raiders of the nearby Fairport Central School District, located in Fairport, New York.

== Sports facilities ==
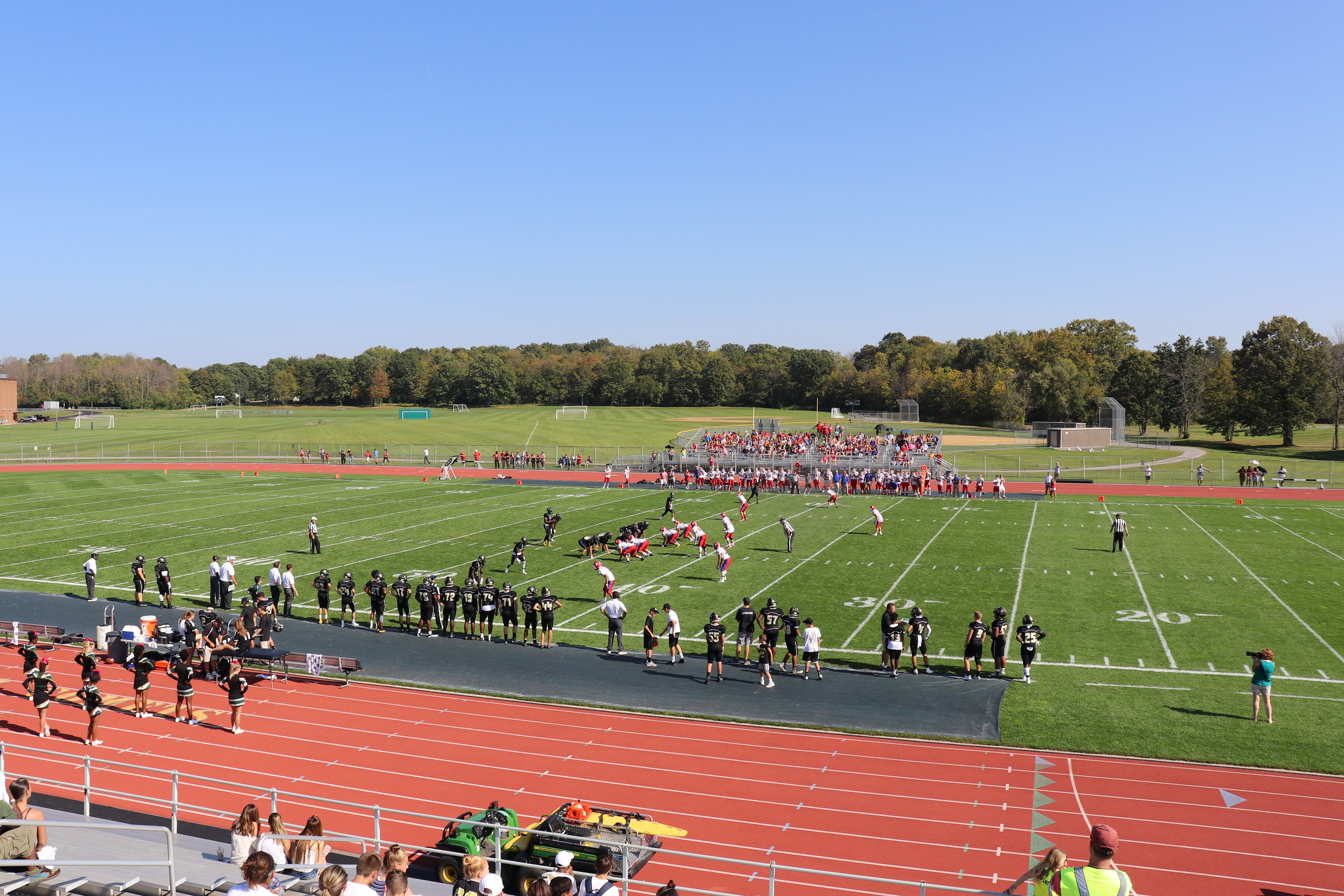
Royal Comets face off against the Fairport High School Red Raiders at Elmer L. Gordon Stadium

The Senior High School has a wide array of sports facilities. The campus includes a turf stadium primarily used for football and lacrosse, as well as a regulation 8-lane track utilized for track and field events. Additional facilities include multiple baseball and softball diamonds and well-kept natural grass fields designated for soccer and general athletic practice.

Inside, an indoor pool features a diving well as standard lap lanes. The school allows time for open swim where any resident of the Rush-Henrietta community may use the pool. A relatively recent renovation added two additional full size basketball courts to the existing one, as well as various space for other sports such as ping pong, volleyball and other net sports.

== Expansion ==
Under the direction of then Superintendent of Schools Ken Graham, the school added on a $15 million gym complex, as well as extensive remodeling to the sports fields located on the campus. This expansion also added eight new classrooms to the academic structure of the building. The expansion also added a senior lounge to the building. The expansion also added a new Literacy Center adjacent to the Senior Lounge. The expansion also added new parking lot space. The expansion was under the supervision of The Rush-Henrietta Central School District. The expansion was completed in September 2014.

== Notable alumni ==
- Blaise Faggiano - head college football coach at Utica College and former defensive coordinator at St. John Fisher College.
- Desmond Green - NY State Champion wrestler; current Mixed Martial Artist
- Mike Nguyen - Class of 1984, is a Vietnamese-American artist who worked as a Supervising Animator on Warner Bros.' The Iron Giant but is most famous for his own animated feature My Little World. Mike Nguyen received his BFA in character animation at the California Institute of the Arts in 1988. Since then, he has worked in the feature animation film industry for over 10 years as an animator, for major studios such as Disney, DreamWorks, and Warner Bros.
- Shenise Johnson - Class of 2008, Professional Women's Basketball player (WNBA) for the Indiana Fever.
- Miranda Melville - Class of 2007, 2016 US Olympic Women's Track and Field Team Member
- Dane Miller Jr. - Class of 2009, Professional basketball player who has played in the Basketball Africa League (BAL).
- Sunny Jain - Class of 1993, jazz drummer and bandleader based in New York City.
