= Andrew Short House =

Historic house in New York, United States

- U.S. National Register of Historic Places
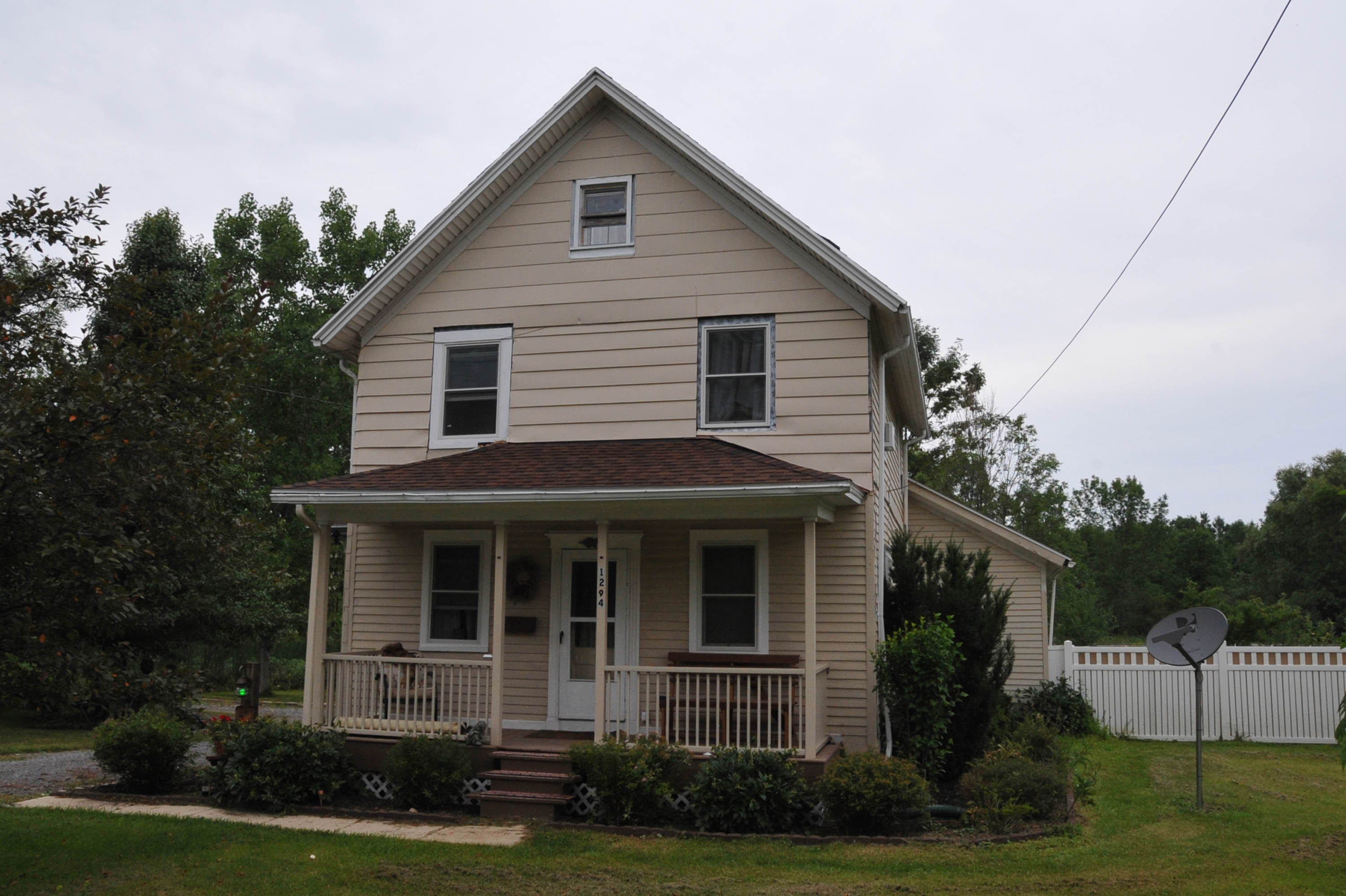
- Andrew Short House, January 2008

- Location within New York Location within the United States
- Location: 1294 Lehigh Station Rd., Henrietta, New York
- Coordinates: 43°03′34″N 77°37′54″W
- Area: less than 1 acre (0.40 ha)
- Built: c. 1855
- NRHP reference No.: 14000005
- Added to NRHP: February 14, 2014

Andrew Short House (originally listed as the Florendin Feasel House) is a historic home located at Henrietta, Monroe County, New York. It was built about 1855, and is a two-story, front gabled frame dwelling with two single-story rear additions. It is of vertical wood plank construction and one of a few surviving farm houses from the 19th century.

It was listed on the National Register of Historic Places in 2014.
