= 2012 San Antonio Silver Stars season =

- Coach: Dan Hughes
- Arena: AT&T Center
- Attendance: per game

Results
- Record: 21–13 (.618)
- Place: 3rd (Western)
- Playoff finish: Lost in Conference Semifinals

Media
- Radio: KTKR
- Television: FS-SW; ESPN2, NBATV

The 2012 WNBA season is the 16th season for the San Antonio Silver Stars franchise of the Women's National Basketball Association. It is their 10th in San Antonio.

== Transactions ==
=== WNBA draft ===
The following are the Silver Stars' selections in the 2012 WNBA draft.

Round	Pick	Player	Nationality	School/team/country
1	5	Shenise Johnson	United States	Miami (FL)

=== Transaction log ===
- April 11, 2011: The Silver Stars traded second- and third-round picks in the 2012 Draft to the Tulsa Shock in exchange for Scholanda Robinson.
- February 8: The Silver Stars signed Shameka Christon.
- February 16: The Silver Stars signed Ify Ibekwe, Kalisha Keane and Latoya Williams.
- February 27: The Silver Stars signed Ziomara Morrison.
- March 1: The Silver Stars traded Roneeka Hodges to the Indiana Fever in exchange for Tangela Smith.
- March 27: The Silver Stars signed Loree Moore.
- April 23: The Silver Stars signed Cierra Bravard and draft pick Shenise Johnson.
- April 30: The Silver Stars waived Ify Ibekwe.
- May 7: The Silver Stars waived Latoya Williams.
- May 14: The Silver Stars waived Cierra Bravard.
- May 15: The Silver Stars waived Kalisha Keane.
- May 16: The Silver Stars waived Loree Moore and Porsha Phillips.

=== Trades ===
Date	Trade	
March 1, 2012	To San Antonio Silver Stars	To Indiana Fever
March 1, 2012	Tangela Smith	Roneeka Hodges
March 14, 2012	To San Antonio Silver Stars	To Chicago Sky
March 14, 2012	Third-round pick in 2013 Draft	Sonja Petrovic

=== Personnel changes ===
==== Additions ====
Player	Signed	Former team
Shameka Christon	February 8, 2012	free agent
Ziomara Morrison	February 27, 2012	free agent
Tangela Smith	March 1, 2012	Indiana Fever
Shenise Johnson	April 16, 2012	draft pick

==== Subtractions ====
Player	Left	New team
Ruth Riley	February 6, 2012	Chicago Sky
Scholanda Dorrell	February 17, 2012	Tulsa Shock
Roneeka Hodges	March 1, 2012	Indiana Fever
Porsha Phillips	May 16, 2012	free agent

== Roster ==
2012 San Antonio Silver Stars roster
Players
Coaches

Pos.	No.	Nat.	Name	Height	Weight	DOB	From	Yrs
F/C	23	(United States)	Adams, Danielle	6' 1" (1.85m)	239 lb (108kg)	1989-02-09	Texas A&M	1
C	32	(United States)	Appel, Jayne	6' 4" (1.93m)	210 lb (95kg)	1988-05-14	Stanford	2
G	41	(Australia)	Bevilaqua, Tully	5' 7" (1.7m)	145 lb (66kg)	1972-07-19	Australia	13
F	20	(United States)	Christon, Shameka	6' 1" (1.85m)	170 lb (77kg)	1982-02-15	Arkansas	7
G	25	(United States)	Hammon, Becky	5' 6" (1.68m)	136 lb (62kg)	1977-03-11	Colorado State	13
G	42	(United States)	Johnson, Shenise	5' 11" (1.8m)		1990-12-09	Miami (FL)	R
C	17	(Chile)	Morrison, Ziomara	6' 4" (1.93m)		1989-02-15	Chile	R
G	7	(United States)	Perkins, Jia	5' 8" (1.73m)	155 lb (70kg)	1982-02-23	Texas Tech	8
G	13	(United States)	Robinson, Danielle	5' 9" (1.75m)	125 lb (57kg)	1989-05-10	Oklahoma	1
F/C	50	(United States)	Smith, Tangela	6' 3" (1.91m)	158 lb (72kg)	1977-04-01	Iowa	14
F	33	(Saint Vincent and the Grenadines)	Young, Sophia	6' 1" (1.85m)	165 lb (75kg)	1983-12-15	Baylor	6

Head coach
(United States) Dan Hughes (Muskingum)
Assistant coaches
(United States) Vickie Johnson (Louisiana Tech)
(United States) Steve Shuman (Sacramento State)
Athletic trainer
(United States) Tonya Holley (St. Andrews Presbyterian)
Strength and conditioning coach
(United States) Chrissy Stragisher (Muskingum)

Legend

- (C) Team captain
- (DP) Unsigned draft pick
- (FA) Free agent
- (S) Suspended
- Injured

=== Depth ===
Pos.	Starter	Bench
C	Jayne Appel	Danielle Adams; Tangela Smith
PF	Sophia Young	Ziomara Morrison
SF	Shameka Christon	Jia Perkins
SG	Becky Hammon	Shenise Johnson
PG	Danielle Robinson	Tully Bevilaqua

== Season standings ==
Western Conference	W	L	PCT	GB	Home	Road	Conf.
Minnesota Lynx ^{z}	27	7	.794	–	16–1	11–6	17–5
Los Angeles Sparks ^{x}	24	10	.706	3.0	16–1	8–9	15–7
San Antonio Silver Stars ^{x}	21	13	.618	6.0	12–5	9–8	14–8
Seattle Storm ^{x}	16	18	.471	11.0	10–7	6–11	11–11
Tulsa Shock ^{o}	9	25	.265	18.0	6–11	3–14	5–17
Phoenix Mercury ^{o}	7	27	.206	20.0	3–14	4–13	4–18

== Schedule ==
=== Preseason ===
2012 Game Log: Preseason (May)

Game	Date	Time (ET)	Opponent	TV	Score	High points	High rebounds	High assists	Location/Attendance	Record
1	Sat 5	8:00	Indiana		67-69	Adams (12)	Adams (7)	Robinson (4)	Trinity University; N/A	0-1
2	Wed 9	12:00	@ Indiana		69-78	Johnson (15)	Phillips (5)	Johnson (3)	Bankers Life Fieldhouse; 5,270	0-2

=== Regular season ===
2012 Game Log: Regular Season
May (1–2)

Game	Date	Time (ET)	Opponent	TV	Score	High points	High rebounds	High assists	Location/Attendance	Record
1	Sat 19	8:00	@ Tulsa	FS-SW	88-79	Young (20)	Young (13)	Hammon (9)	BOK Center; 7,509	1-0
2	Fri 25	7:00	@ Connecticut	CPTV-S	79-83	Adams (21)	Young (9)	Hammon (6)	Mohegan Sun Arena; 6,115	1-1
3	Wed 30	8:00	Chicago	CN100	63-77	Hammon (21)	Adams; Appel (6)	Hammon; Robinson (5)	AT&T Center; 7,233	1-2

June (5–3)

Game	Date	Time (ET)	Opponent	TV	Score	High points	High rebounds	High assists	Location/Attendance	Record
4	Fri 1	8:00	Phoenix		85-66	Hammon (30)	Appel (11)	Robinson (11)	AT&T Center; 6,534	2-2
5	Sun 3	7:00	@ Minnesota	FS-SW	79-83	Adams (21)	Johnson; Young (7)	Hammon (4)	Target Center; 7,942	2-3
6	Fri 8	7:30	@ Atlanta	SSO	57-60	Young (21)	Young (7)	Hammon (4)	Philips Arena; 4,501	2-4
7	Sat 9	8:00	Seattle	FS-SW	80-67	Adams (13)	Appel (6)	Appel; Hammon; Perkins (4)	AT&T Center; 8,187	3-4
8	Sat 16	8:00	Los Angeles	FS-SW; KDOC	98-85 (OT)	Hammon; Young (24)	Appel; Young (8)	Hammon (7)	AT&T Center; 8,234	4-4
9	Fri 22	10:00	@ Seattle		76-82	Perkins (20)	Johnson (6)	Hammon (6)	KeyArena; 6,849	4-5
10	Sun 24	8:30	@ Los Angeles	KDOC	91-71	Young (20)	Appel (11)	Hammon (10)	Staples Center; 11,301	5-5
11	Thu 28	12:30	Los Angeles	FS-SW	94-80	Young (23)	Adams (7)	Hammon (6)	AT&T Center; 15,184	6-5

July (7–0)

Game	Date	Time (ET)	Opponent	TV	Score	High points	High rebounds	High assists	Location/Attendance	Record
12	Sun 1	3:00	Minnesota	NBATV	93-84	Hammon (23)	Young (10)	Hammon (8)	AT&T Center; 6,568	7-5
13	Tue 3	8:00	Phoenix	NBATV	82-81	Adams (24)	Young (14)	Hammon; Robinson (4)	AT&T Center; 6,912	8-5
14	Thu 5	7:00	@ Indiana	NBATV	88-72	Hammon (19)	Adams (10)	Robinson (5)	Bankers Life Fieldhouse; 6,088	9-5
15	Fri 6	7:00	@ Washington	NBATV; CSN-MA	78-73	Young (18)	Appel (7)	Hammon (6)	Verizon Center; 6,522	10-5
16	Sun 8	4:00	@ New York	NBATV; MSG	94-81	Perkins (24)	Young (7)	Robinson (9)	Prudential Center; 7,714	11-5
17	Wed 11	12:30	@ Chicago		77-68	Robinson; Young (16)	Appel (5)	Hammon (7)	Allstate Arena; 13,161	12-5
18	Fri 13	8:00	Atlanta	FS-SW; SSO	91-70	Perkins (21)	Appel; Johnson (9)	Robinson (7)	AT&T Center; 13,426	13-5
Summer Olympic break

August (4-3)

Game	Date	Time (ET)	Opponent	TV	Score	High points	High rebounds	High assists	Location/Attendance	Record
Summer Olympic break
19	Fri 17	8:00	@ Tulsa		89-79	Young (20)	Adams (8)	Hammon (8)	BOK Center; 6,270	14-5
20	Sun 19	6:00	@ Phoenix	FS-SW	89-47	Hammon (19)	Appel (10)	Robinson (4)	US Airways Center; 10,656	15-5
21	Tue 21	8:00	Washington	NBATV	75-72	Hammon (22)	Appel (10)	Hammon (4)	AT&T Center; 5,913	16-5
22	Thu 23	10:30	@ Los Angeles	TWC101	77-101	Robinson (22)	Appel; Johnson; Robinson (5)	Robinson	Staples Center; 8,696	16-6
23	Sat 25	8:00	Tulsa	FS-SW	91-71	Perkins (21)	Johnson (7)	Hammon; Robinson (6)	AT&T Center; 9,025	17-6
24	Tue 28	8:00	@ Minnesota	NBATV	84-96 (OT)	Young (19)	Young (6)	Hammon; Robinson (4)	Target Center; 8,532	17-7
25	Thu 30	8:00	Connecticut		73-84	Adams (22)	Young (10)	Hammon (8)	AT&T Center; 5,023	17-8

September (4–5)

Game	Date	Time (ET)	Opponent	TV	Score	High points	High rebounds	High assists	Location/Attendance	Record
26	Sat 1	10:00	@ Phoenix	NBATV	90-94	Young (32)	Young (8)	Hammon (5)	US Airways Center; 5,964	17-9
27	Fri 7	8:00	Indiana		78-82	Hammon (15)	Appel (10)	Robinson (5)	AT&T Center; 8,097	17-10
28	Sun 9	3:00	Minnesota	NBATV	62-81	Young (20)	Young; Appel (8)	Christon (4)	AT&T Center; 6,025	17-11
29	Wed 12	8:00	@ Tulsa		78-67	Christon (17)	Appel (11)	Hammon (7)	BOK Center; 4,543	18-11
30	Fri 14	8:00	Seattle	NBATV	90-66	Hammon (25)	Young (9)	Hammon (5)	AT&T Center; 7,109	19-11
31	Sun 16	3:00	Tulsa		70-80	Young (15)	Young; Appel (8)	Robinson (5)	AT&T Center; 5,246	19-12
32	Tue 18	8:00	New York	ESPN2	77-66	Robinson (21)	Young (10)	Robinson (5)	AT&T Center; 6,650	20-12
33	Fri 21	10:00	@ Seattle		75-84	Adams (16)	Young (11)	Adams; Hammon (6)	KeyArena; 8,494	20-13
34	Sun 23	3:00	Minnesota		99-84	Adams (28)	Adams; Christon (6)	Robinson; Smith (6)	AT&T Center; 8,084	21-13

All games are viewable on WNBA LiveAccess or ESPN3.com

=== Postseason ===
2012 Game Log: Postseason
Western Conference Semifinals

Game	Date	Time (ET)	Opponent	TV	Score	High points	High rebounds	High assists	Location/Attendance	Series
1	September 27	10:00	@ Los Angeles	ESPN2	86-93	Hammon (19)	Appel (7)	Hammon (6)	Galen Center; 5,013	0-1
2	September 29	3:00	Los Angeles	NBATV	101-94	Young (28)	Adams (8)	Robinson (5)	Freeman Coliseum; 5,293	0-2
