= Antoinette Brown Blackwell =

American philosopher (1825-1921)

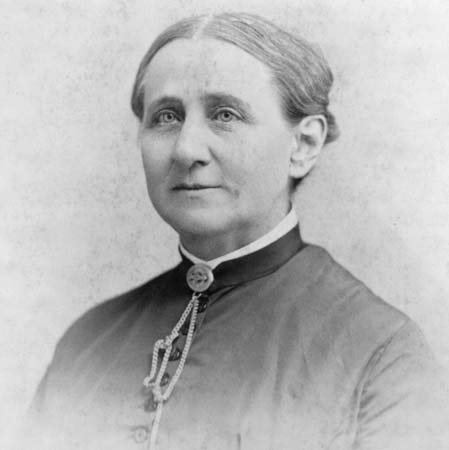
- Blackwell, c. 1900
- Born: Antoinette Louisa Brown; May 20, 1825; Henrietta, New York
- Died: November 5, 1921 (aged 96); Elizabeth, New Jersey
- Other name: Antoinette Blackwell
- Known for: First woman American ordained minister Women's rights advocacy
- Spouse: Samuel Charles Blackwell
- Children: 7

Antoinette Louisa Brown, later Antoinette Brown Blackwell (May 20, 1825 – November 5, 1921), was the first woman to be ordained as a mainstream Protestant minister in the United States. She was a well-versed public speaker on the paramount issues of her time and distinguished herself from her contemporaries with her use of religious faith in her efforts to expand women's rights. She was also known for her science based refutation of Darwin's gender bias in The Descent of Man, and Selection in Relation to Sex with her book The Sexes Throughout Nature.

== Early life and education ==
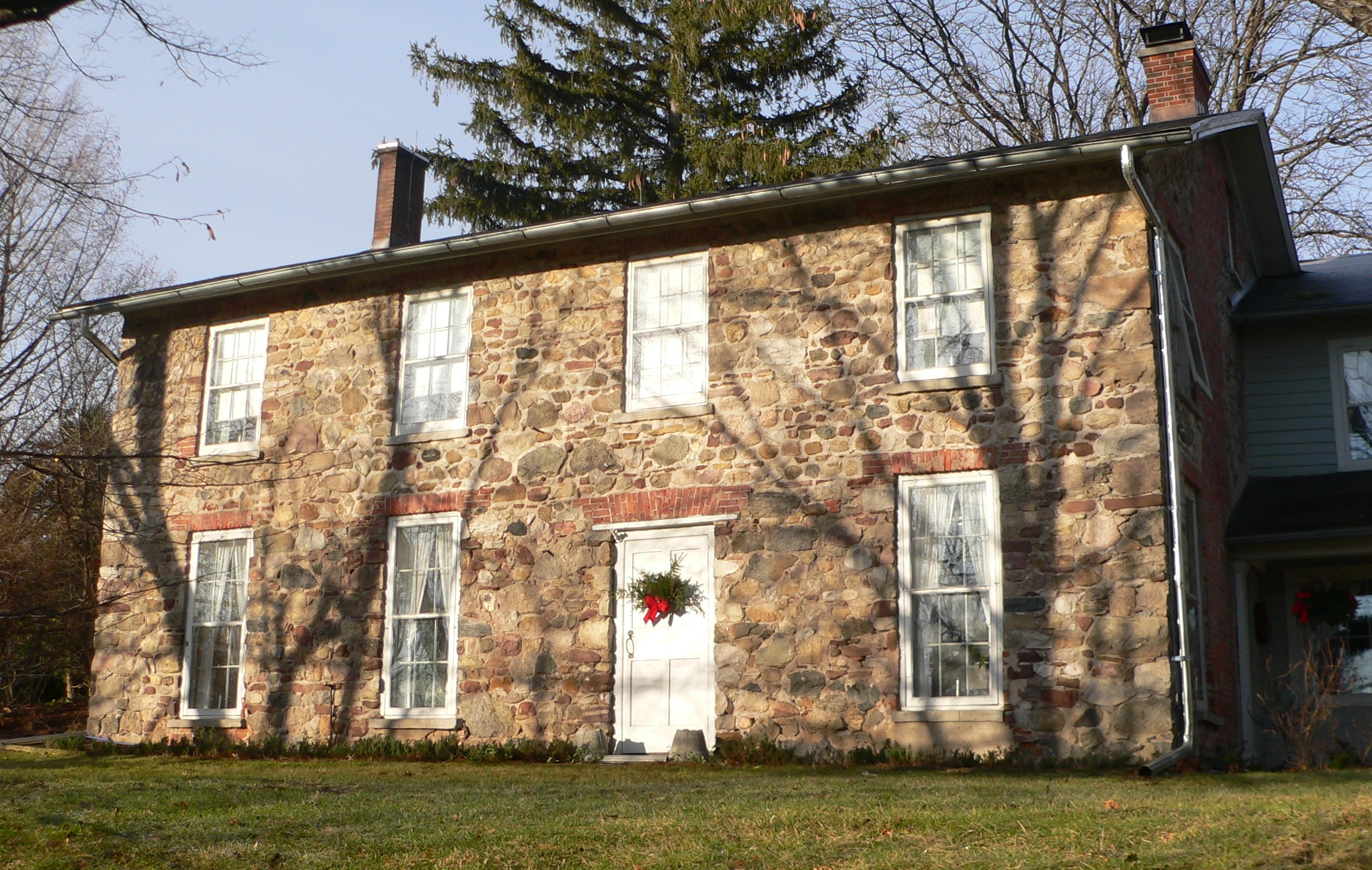
Antoinette Louisa Brown's childhood home, located at 1099 Pinnacle Road in Henrietta, NY.

Brown was born the youngest of seven in Henrietta, New York, to Joseph Brown and Abby Morse. Brown was recognized as highly intelligent as early as three years old. The preaching of evangelist Charles Grandison Finney from nearby Rochester led Brown's family to join the Congregational Church. After daring to inject a prayer into her family's religious observance, Brown was accepted into the church before the age of nine. Shortly after becoming a member of the congregation, she began to preach during Sunday meetings. In 1841 at the age of 16, after completing her requisite early schooling at Monroe County Academy, Brown taught school herself. She did not intend to spend her life teaching and so she set her sights on a degree in theology from Oberlin College and a career in the pulpit.

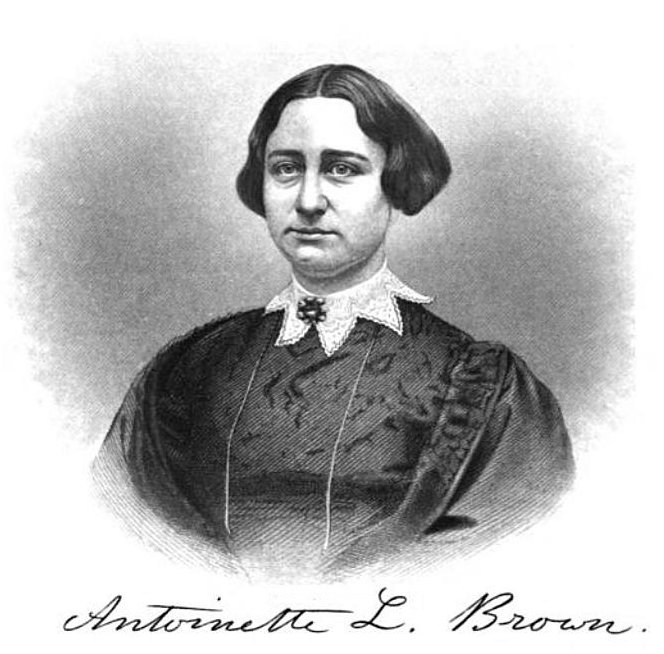
Brown before she married.

For four years, Antoinette taught school and saved enough money to cover the cost of her tuition at Oberlin College in Ohio. Supported by her parents, who believed not only in equal education for men and women, but also for blacks, she enrolled at Oberlin College in 1846. At the college, she completed the literary course and received her literary degree in 1847, the prescribed course for women students. She spent her vacations in teaching and in the study of Hebrew and Greek. In 1847, after graduating with her bachelor's degree, she lobbied the college for admission to the college's theological course with its emphasis on Congregationalist ministry. The administration, opposed to the idea of a woman engaging in any kind of formal theological learning and training, eventually capitulated but with a specific set of pre-conditions: Antoinette may enroll in the courses, but she was not to receive formal recognition. Despite the stipulations made regarding her participation in the theology course, Antoinette was a prolific writer and charismatic public speaker. Her exegesis on the writings of the Apostle Paul was published in the Oberlin Quarterly Review. It is there, from a brief excerpt, that her understanding of what may now be popularly called feminist theology, takes shape as she writes: "Paul meant only to warn against 'excesses, irregularities, and unwarrantable liberties' in public worship.'" She insisted that the Bible and its various pronouncements about women were for a specific span of time and certainly not applicable to the 19th century. Even though women were not asked to do public speaking during this time Antoinette was asked to speak in Ohio and New York to speak about anti-slavery and on women's rights. In April 1860, Brown returned to Oberlin College to deliver a lecture entitled "Men and Women." Testament to Brown's oratory skills appeared in a student letter which noted, "it was an excellent lecture."

== Career ==
=== Abolition and ordination ===
Without a preaching license following graduation, Brown decided to pause her ministerial ambitions to write for Frederick Douglass' abolitionist paper, The North Star. She spoke in 1850 at the first National Women's Rights Convention, giving a speech that was well received and served as the beginning of a speaking tour in which she would address issues such as abolition, temperance, and women's rights. Brown spoke at many of the subsequent annual National Women's Rights Conventions.

Brown was eventually given a license to preach by the Congregational Church in 1851 and then offered a position as Minister of a Congregationalist church in South Butler, New York in 1852. She temporarily suspended her vast speaking engagements, writing to her friend (and later sister-in-law) Lucy Stone that she had lectured eighteen times in almost as many days, and was ordained by a socially radical Wesleyan Methodist minister named Luther Lee, a passionate and vocal advocate of women's right to theological education and leadership. At her ordination, Lee delivered a sermon testifying to Antoinette's suitability as a preacher and her calling from God: "If God and mental and moral culture have not already qualified her," he said to the crowd assembled for the occasion, "we cannot, by anything we may do by way of ordaining or setting her apart ... All we are here to do ... is ... to subscribe our testimony to the fact, that in our belief, our sister in Christ, Antoinette L. Brown, is one of the ministers of the New Covenant, authorized, qualified, and called by God to preach the gospel of his Son Jesus Christ." A month after her ordination Brown traveled as a delegate to the World's Temperance Convention in New York City, where despite representing two temperance organizations, she was denied a chance to speak by the organizers. In the words of Carol Lasser and Marlene Deahl Merrill, Brown again "faced the difficulties of combining essentially conservative causes with women's right's work" at the Temperance Conference At a crossroads in her life, in 1854, Blackwell wrote, "I [find] that the whole groundwork of my faith has dropped away from me." This tension manifested itself within her, and after a year she decided to leave South Butler; and unfortunately, even Luther Lee's unqualified support of Antoinette was not enough to provide her with a sustainable lifestyle there. The Boston Investigator reported her departure with the headline: "REV. ANTOINETTE BROWN, more recently Rev. Mrs. Blackwell, seems to have made a failure in her first pastorate." She did not fail the pastorate due to her gender, but rather a growing insecurity of belief in the orthodoxy of the Congregational ministry, compounded with a lack of sustainable resources for her work. In 1857, she returned to her work as an orator and reformer.

=== Women's rights ===
Following her separation from the ministry, she focused increasingly on women's rights issues. While many women's rights activists opposed religion on the basis that it served to oppress women, Blackwell was steadfast in her belief that women's active participation in religion could serve to further their status in society. Unlike many of her peers, she cared more about improving women's status in society than for suffrage. She believed that the inherent differences between men and women limited men's effectiveness in representing women in politics; thus suffrage would have little positive impact for women unless it was coupled with tangible leadership opportunities. Brown also diverged in opinion from other reformers with her opposition to divorce as a means of easing women's marital restrictions.

Antoinette left for New York City to do charity work in the slums and to lecture and raise money for the people who lived there. On her way to New York City, she stopped in Worcester, Massachusetts to attend the first National Woman's Rights Convention. This convention influenced her so much that she decided to become an independent speaker. She traveled throughout New England in places like Pennsylvania and Ohio to speak on Woman's Rights, Anti-Slavery and Temperance. She sometimes even spoke in church sermons when she had the chance.

With regard to her own prospect of marriage, Brown believed that it was best to remain single because single women experienced greater levels of independence than married women. Upon meeting Samuel Blackwell, her opinions began to waver in favor of marriage. The two married on January 24, 1856, and they had seven children, two dying in infancy.

Blackwell continued her career until domestic responsibilities and her disagreement with many aspects of the women's rights movement caused her to discontinue lecturing. Writing became her new outlet for asserting social change for women; in her works she encouraged women to seek out masculine professions and men to share in household duties, yet she retained the belief that women's primary role was care of the home and family. Inspired by, yet critical of, the writings of Charles Darwin and Herbert Spencer, who she considered to be the most influential men of her day, Blackwell published several works in the fields of theology, science and philosophy. She believed both Darwin and Spencer employed a tainted version of the scientific method, one that embraced a solely masculine vantage point. Blackwell instead asserted that in order to understand women in society, women themselves ought to conduct the study of women, which Blackwell termed the "science of Feminine Humanity." Perhaps her most notable work was published in 1875, The Sexes Throughout Nature, in which she presented a scientific theory arguing that the sexes are different but equal by way of natural evolution. She knew she would be considered presumptuous for criticizing evolutionary theory, but wrote that "However great the disadvantages under which we [women] are placed, these will never be lessened by waiting." Darwin had written a letter to her in 1869, thanking her for a copy of her book, Studies in General Science. She also wrote a novel, The Island Neighbors, in 1871, and a collection of poetry, Sea Drift, in 1902.

In 1860, at the last National Woman's Rights Convention held before the outbreak of the Civil War, Antoinette engaged in the heated debate about divorce with her colleagues and contemporaries, Susan B. Anthony and Elizabeth Cady Stanton. She was opposed to an easy divorce arguing, "the married partner can not annul his obligations to the other… All divorce is naturally and morally impossible." Antoinette, a staunch abolitionist and suffragist, contrary to the hopes of her friends and fellow suffragists, supported the passage of the Fourteenth Amendment to the Constitution, which did not include the right of free women to vote. In 1869, during the controversy over the amendment, she and Lucy Stone separated from other preeminent women's rights activists to form the American Woman Suffrage Association as a counterweight to Anthony's National Woman Suffrage Association.

In 1873, Blackwell founded the Association for the Advancement of Women in an attempt to address women's issues that similar organizations ignored. She was elected president of the New Jersey Woman Suffrage Association in 1891 and helped found the American Purity Association. She also lectured on behalf of the poor of New York City.

== Later life ==
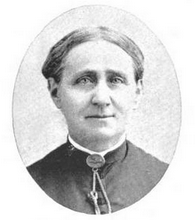
Antoinette Blackwell (1894)

Oberlin College awarded Brown an honorary Master's and Doctoral degrees in 1878 and 1908, respectively.

In 1878, she returned to organized religion, becoming a Unitarian. She applied to the American Unitarian Association and was recognized as a minister. She spoke in Unitarian churches and resumed her lecture touring.

In 1893, Brown attended the Parliament of Religions during the Columbian Exposition in Chicago. There, she said, "Women are needed in the pulpit as imperatively and for the same reason that they are needed in the world — because they are women. Women have become — or when the ingrained habit of unconscious imitation has been superseded, they will become — indispensable to the religious evolution of the human race."

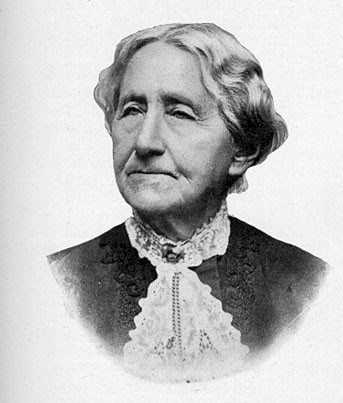
Antoinette Brown Blackwell pictured in her later years

In 1903, she helped found the Unitarian Society of Elizabeth, New Jersey, serving as its minister.

In 1914, she celebrated her eighty-ninth birthday planting trees in her private forest in Martha's Vineyard.

In 1920, at age 95, she was the only surviving participant of the 1850 Women's Rights Convention that took place in Worcester, Massachusetts, to see the passage of the Nineteenth Amendment to the Constitution, which gave women the right to vote. She voted for Warren G. Harding in the 1920 presidential election.

== Death and legacy ==
Antoinette Brown Blackwell died November 5, 1921, at the age of 96 in Elizabeth, New Jersey.

Her childhood home was listed on the National Register of Historic Places in 1989.

In 1975, the United Church of Christ at its 10th General Synod began awarding the Antoinette Brown Awards to ordained UCC women who "exemplify the contributions that women can make through ordained ministry, have provided outstanding ministry in a parish or other church-related institutions, including women in specialized ministry, and have a sensitivity concerning the challenges and possibilities of women in ministry and advocacy on behalf of all women in the church."

In 1993, Antoinette Brown Blackwell was inducted into the National Women's Hall of Fame.

== Selected works ==
- Studies in General Science. New York: G.P. Putnam and Son, 1869.
- The Sexes Throughout Nature. New York: G.P. Putnam and Son, 1875.
- The Physical Basis of Immortality. New York: G.P. Putnam and Son, 1876.
- The Philosophy of Individuality. New York: G.P. Putnam and Son, 1893.
- The Making of the Universe. Boston, Massachusetts: The Gorham press, 1914.
- The Social Side of Mind and Action. New York: The Neale Publishing Company, 1915.
- The Island Neighbors. New York: Harper & Brothers, 1871. (Novel)
- Sea Drift. New York: J.T. White & Co., 1902. (Poetry)

== See also ==
- Antoinette Louisa Brown Blackwell Childhood Home
- Olympia Brown, a follower of Blackwell's who became the first woman ordained by her denomination at large
- List of civil rights leaders
- List of suffragists and suffragettes
- List of women's rights activists
- List of women's suffrage organizations
- Ordination of women
- Timeline of women's suffrage
- Women's suffrage in the United States
- Votes For Women History Trail
