= The Sexes Throughout Nature =

1875 book by Antoinette Brown Blackwell

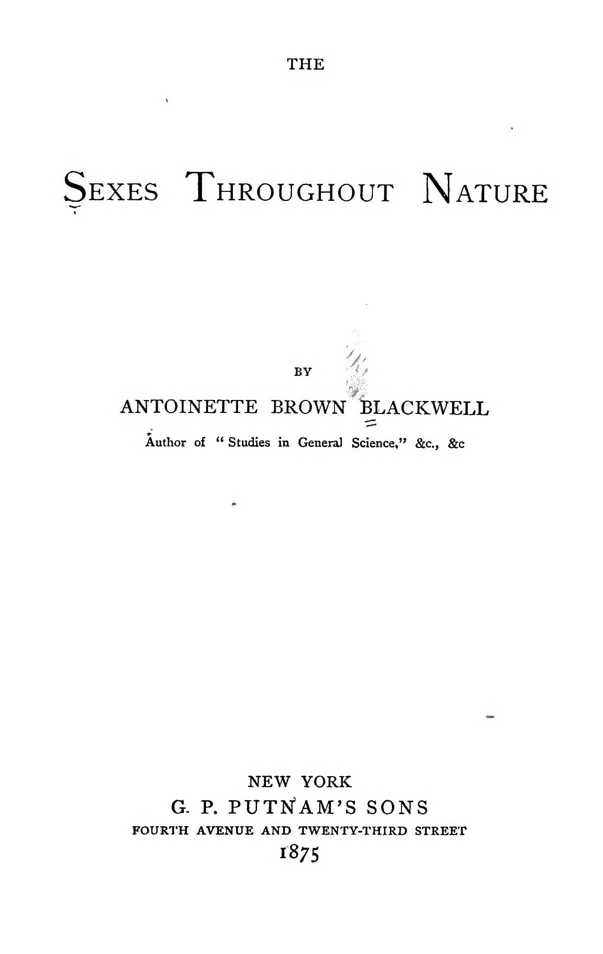
- Title page of The Sexes Throughout Nature
- Author: Antoinette Brown Blackwell
- Publisher: G. P. Putnam's Sons
- Publication date: 1875

The Sexes Throughout Nature is a book written by Antoinette Brown Blackwell, published by G. P. Putnam's Sons in 1875.

== Overview and print history ==
The book critiques Charles Darwin four years after he published The Descent of Man, and Selection in Relation to Sex in 1871, and Herbert Spencer, whom the author thought were the most influential men of her day. Darwin had written a letter to her in 1869, thanking her for a copy of her book, Studies in General Science. She also answers Dr. E. H. Clarke and his book Sex and Education which she deplored. Blackwell's book was republished by Hyperion Press in 1976, 1985 and 1992. Parts of the book were first published in Woman's Journal and Popular Science Monthly.

Blackwell chose to highlight balance and cooperation rather than struggle and savage rivalry. She criticized Darwin for basing his theory of evolution on "time-honored assumption that the male is the normal type of his species". She wrote that Spencer scientifically subtracts from the female and Darwin as scientifically adds to the male. It was not until one century later that feminists were working from inside the natural sciences, and could address Darwin's androcentricity.

Sarah Blaffer Hrdy wrote in her book Mother Nature: A History of Mothers, Infants and Natural Selection (quoting from an excerpt of pages 12–25 in AnthroNotes for educators published by the National Museum of Natural History),

"For a handful of nineteenth-century women intellectuals, however, evolutionary theory was just too important to ignore. Instead of turning away, they stepped forward to tap Darwin and Spencer on the shoulder to express their support for this revolutionary view of human nature, and also to politely remind them that they had left out half the species."

Hrdy added, "Evolutionary biology did eventually respond to these criticisms, yet in their lifetimes, the effect that these early Darwinian feminists—Eliot, Blackwell, Royer, and a few others—had on mainstream evolutionary theory can be summed up with one phrase: the road not taken."

== Themes and Arguments ==
In The Sexes Throughout Nature, Blackwell presents a systematic critique of Charles Darwin's The Descent of Man (1871) and Herbert Spencer's Principles of Biology (1864). While accepting the fundamental tenets of natural selection and evolution, Blackwell argued that the male-dominated scientific community had misinterpreted the data regarding female physiology and behavior.

=== The Theory of Equivalence ===
The central thesis of the book is the "Theory of Equivalence." Blackwell challenged Darwin’s assertion that the male sex was evolutionarily superior due to greater size, strength, and variability. Instead, she posited that nature relies on a balance of physiological and morphological expenditures. Blackwell argued that the sexes are "equivalents—equals but not identicals," meaning that for every evolutionary trait developed in the male (such as muscle mass or plumage), there is a corresponding and equivalent expenditure of energy in the female (specifically regarding the complex functions of reproduction and gestation).

=== Complexity vs. Size ===
Blackwell criticized the scientific tendency to measure evolutionary worth through external physical characteristics. She used the example of the lion to refute the idea that male "pugnacity" and size indicated superiority. She argued that the female lion’s reproductive system represented a higher degree of biological complexity than the male's mane or muscle mass. By reclassifying the energy required for maternity as a "high order" evolutionary function rather than a developmental drain, Blackwell asserted that female physiology was as advanced as male morphology.

=== Cooperation in Evolution ===
While Darwin emphasized competition and the "struggle for existence" between males for access to females, Blackwell highlighted the role of cooperation. She argued that the survival of species depended equally on the collaborative rearing of offspring and domestic partnership, viewing the female not as a passive prize for the victor, but as an active agent in evolutionary continuity.

=== Critique of Androcentric Bias ===
Blackwell was among the first to identify what is now known as androcentrism in scientific methodology. She argued that because biology and botany were fields dominated exclusively by men, the interpretation of natural facts was inherently skewed toward a male perspective. She wrote that "only a woman can approach the subject from a woman's standpoint," suggesting that a complete understanding of evolution required diverse perspectives.

== Contemporary reviews ==
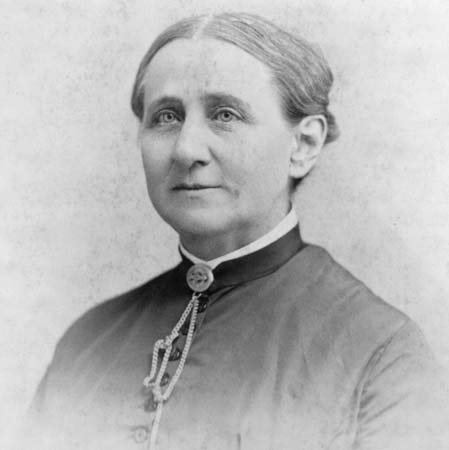
Antoinette Blackwell

Popular Science said it is a "monograph, written to establish, on scientific grounds, the equality of the sexes throughout Nature". "Mrs. Blackwell seems to us quite oblivious of the difficulties of the task here undertaken". And, regarding maternity, "Denying, as we do, the equality of the sexes, and holding to the superiority of the female sex, we protest against the degradation of woman implied...".

Publishers Weekly thought it was an "important contribution to the famous 'sex and education' controversy...".

The Unitarian Review said the "modesty of its preface, at the outset, ought to disarm of his prejudices any reader who can see only superficiality and pretense in the efforts of women after the higher sciences".

The editor Percy M. Wallace made fun of the book in the notes of the 1897 edition of Tennyson's The Princess: "When the man wants weight, the woman takes it up,/And topples down the scales". Explained in a note by "when the man neglects the proper functions of his supremacy, the woman assumes them, and the result is a subversion of the order of nature" followed by a quote of pages 96 and 97 in which Blackwell notes that whenever brilliant-colored male birds acquire maternal instincts, the females acquire male characteristics.

== Contents ==
- Sex and Evolution

- The Statement
- The Argument

- The Alleged Antagonism Between Growth and Reproduction
- Sex and Work
- The Building of a Brain
- The Trial by Science

== Bibliography ==
- Blackwell, Antoinette (1992) [1875]. The Sexes Throughout Nature. Hyperion Press. ISBN 978-0-88355-349-7.
