= Rush–Henrietta Central School District =

School district in the U.S. state of New York

The Rush–Henrietta Central School District is a public school district in New York State that serves approximately 6,000 students in the towns of Rush and Henrietta, and portions of Brighton and Pittsford in Monroe County with over 1,100 employees and an operating budget of $93 million (~$15,789 per student).

The average class size is 15(K–2), 18(3–5), 24(6–12) students and the student-teacher ratio is 10:1 (elementary), 12:1 (middle-high school).

The Rush–Henrietta school district opened on July 1, 1947 as a consolidation of several small schools, approved by residents in Rush and Henrietta on November 14, 1946. An earlier 1938 attempt to consolidate was defeated.

== Administration ==
The district offices are located near the Webster Building (Formally the Ninth Grade Academy) and Winslow Elementary School at 2034 Lehigh Station Rd. in Henrietta. The current Superintendent of Schools is Dr. Barbara Mullen.

=== Board of education ===
The Board of Education has seven elected members. Members serve three-year terms with two to three seats up election each year. Current members:

- Scott M. Adair, President
- Shiloh Arthmann, Vice President
- Mai Abdullah
- Suzanne Bennett
- Laura Borate
- Kimberly DeLardge

== List of schools ==
- High school (Grades 10–12):
  - Senior High School, Interim Principal - Dave Dunn
- Junior High Schools (Grades 7–9):
  - Burger Junior High School, Principal - Stephanie Bliss-Walker
  - Roth Junior High School (opened 1952), Principal - Omar Hussain
- Intermediate Schools (Grades 4–6):
  - Sherman Elementary School, Principal - Courtney Betancourt
  - Vollmer Elementary School, Principal - Yarajia Nguyen
- Elementary Schools (Grades K-3):
  - Leary Elementary School, Principal - Meaghan Magee
  - Fyle Elementary School (opened 1964), Principal - Marcy Mooney
  - Crane Elementary School, Principal - Brian Hill
  - Winslow Elementary School, Principal - Jennifer Tomalty
- Other Schools
  - Good Shepherd School
  - Webster Learning Center

== High School Mascot and School Colors ==
The high school's mascot is a lion. Home to the Royal Comets, the school colors are green, gold and black. Before the Sperry building became the district's only high school, Roth, one of the district's two current junior high schools, was also a high school. During that time, the two high schools represented themselves as the Sperry Comets (green and gold) and the Roth Royals (black and gold). With the change to a single high school came the merger of the two nicknames and the 3 color scheme.

== Performance ==
In June 2007, the American Music Conference recognized the district as being among the 2007 "Best 100 Communities for Music Education".

== Sports ==
In 1982 the Rush–Henrietta Sperry Comets Varsity Lacrosse team won the Section V Lacrosse Championship game. They went on to the New York State Championship round and lost to Gowanda 14–11. http://sportsfive.net/tournaments/brackets.php?year=1982&tourn=nys

In 1983 the Rush–Henrietta Roth Royals Varsity Lacrosse team won the Section V Lacrosse championship game, defeating Webster Thomas 7–5. They went on to the New York State Championship round and defeated Gowanda 15–9. They then faced powerhouse West Genesee and lost 15–5. http://sportsfive.net/tournaments/brackets.php?year=1983&tourn=nys

In 1990 the Rush–Henrietta Royal Comets Varsity Baseball team defeated Hilton 4-3 to win the Section 5 Championship

On November 8, 2010, the Rush–Henrietta Royal Comets Varsity football team won the Section V football Championship game, defeating the Troy Flying Horses 40–28. They went 13–0 in the 2010 season.

== See also ==
- List of school districts in New York
