= Henrietta, New York =

- Town
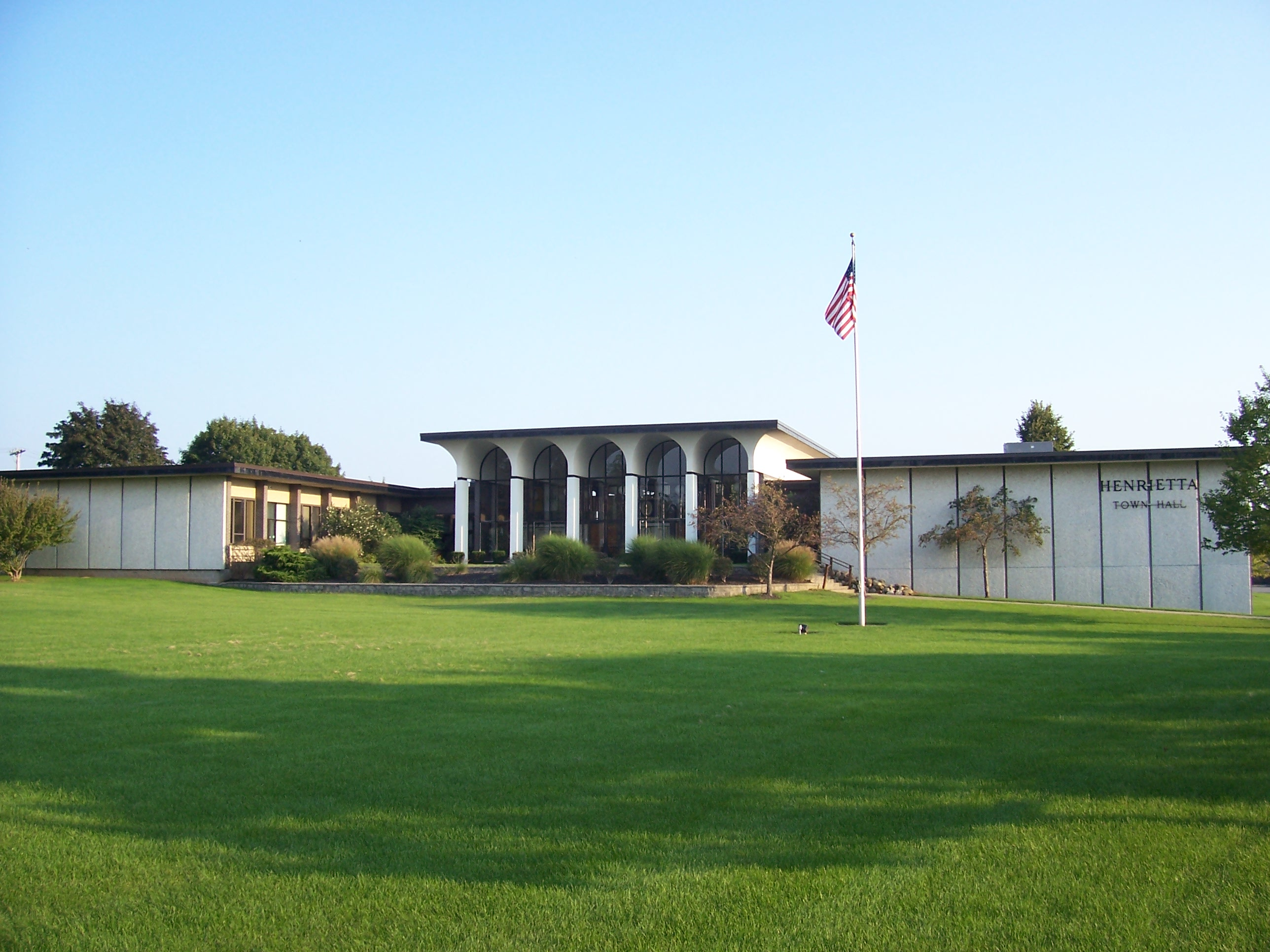
- Town hall

- Location in Monroe County and the state of New York

- Location of New York in the United States
- Coordinates: 43°03′34″N 77°36′53″W
- Country: United States
- State: New York
- County: Monroe
- Established: March 27, 1818; 208 years ago

Government
  - Town supervisor: Stephen L. Schultz (D) First elected 2017 Town council: Rick Page (R); Joseph Bellanca, Jr. (R); Robert Barley, Jr. (D); Michael Stafford (D)

Area
  - Total: 35.64 sq mi (92.32 km^{2})
  - Land: 35.35 sq mi (91.56 km^{2})
  - Water: 0.30 sq mi (0.77 km^{2})
- Elevation: 600 ft (180 m)

Population (2020)
  - Total: 47,096
  - Density: 1,332.2/sq mi (514.37/km^{2})
- Time zone: UTC-5 (EST)
  - Summer (DST): UTC-4 (EDT)
- ZIP Codes: 14467 (Henrietta); 14586 (West Henrietta); 14534 (Pittsford); 14543 (Rush); 14618, 14623 (Rochester)
- Area code: 585
- FIPS code: 36-055-34099
- Website: www.henriettany.gov

Henrietta is a town in Monroe County, New York, United States, and a suburb of the city of Rochester. The population of Henrietta was 47,096 as of the 2020 census, up from 42,581 in 2010. Henrietta is home to the Rochester Institute of Technology, the National Technical Institute for the Deaf and one of the largest retail shopping districts in Monroe County.

== History ==
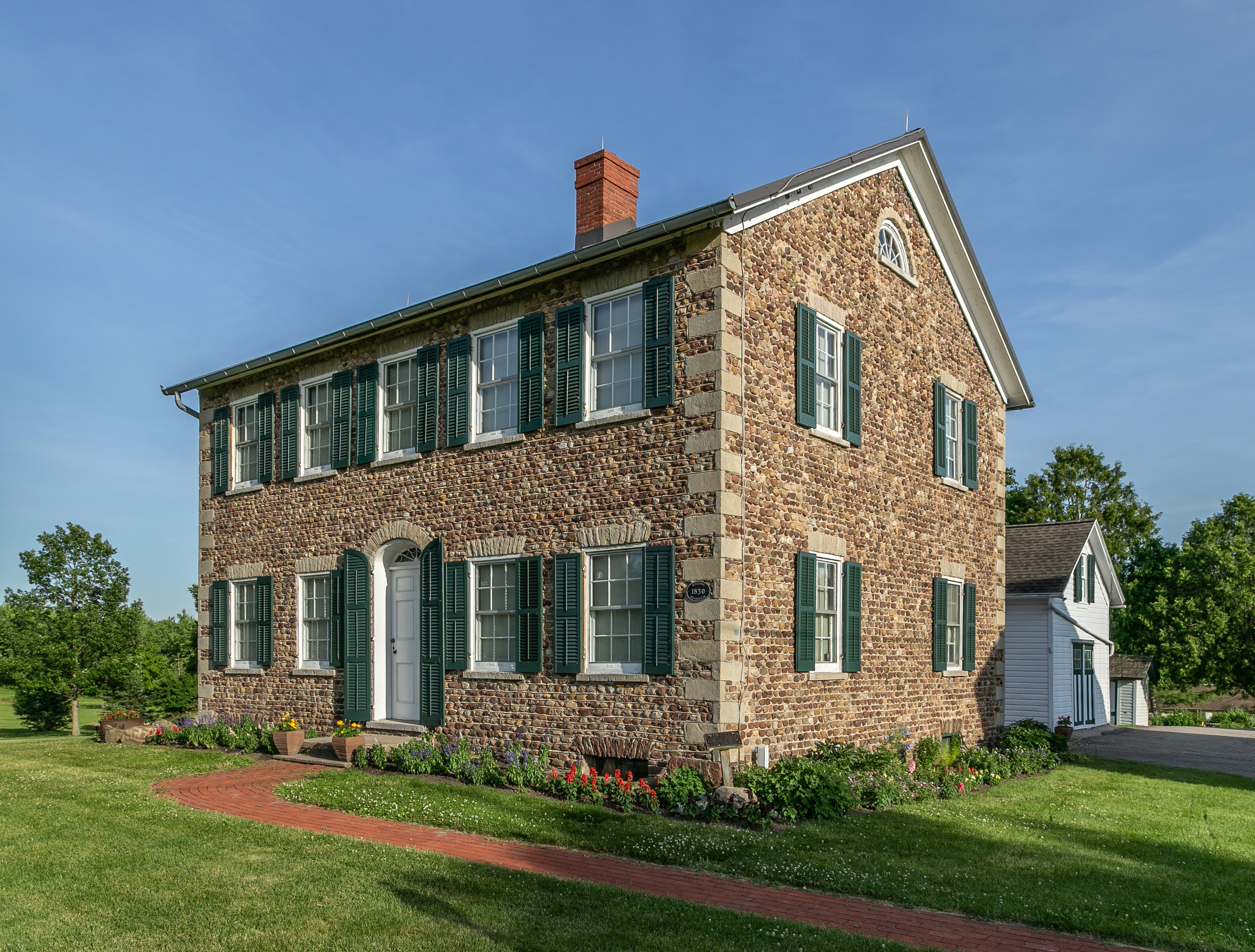
Tinker Cobblestone Homestead (2022)

The first residents of present-day were Native Americans. Although no evidence of Native American villages has been found in Henrietta, numerous artifacts and skeletons have been unearthed by farmers and archeologists over the past 200 years. With the end of the American Revolution, several Iroquois tribes that had sided with the British were forced to leave Upstate New York. As a result, land became available for European settlers in the Finger Lakes and Genesee Valley regions.

The town of Henrietta was named after Henrietta Laura Pulteney, Countess of Bath in Great Britain. Her father Sir William Pulteney, 5th Baronet, a major British investor from the Pulteney Association, owned the land that became the town. Henrietta Pulteney never visited the United states. Pulteney eventually sold his holdings, which then passed through the hands of several American investors.

The first European settlers in Henrietta were Major Ezekiel Scott and his wife Catherine, who purchased 900 acres (360 ha) in 1790. Most of the original arriving settlers were English. Two villages, East and West Henrietta, arose in the area, both part of the town of Pittsford. In 1818, a dispute about the recording of deeds prompted residents of the two villages to secede from Pittsford and form the town of Henrietta.

With the opening of the Erie Canal in 1825, Henrietta farmers gained access to the New York City market for their crops and the town prospered. In 1826, the Monroe Academy opened in Henrietta, becoming the first incorporated school in Monroe County.

After the end of World War II, the population of Henrietta rose from 3,000 to approximately 14,000 in ten years as suburban development grew around the city of Rochester. The opening of the New York State Thruway through Henrietta in 1954 made the town more desirable for commercial development. In 1968, the Rochester Institute of Technology (RIT) moved from Rochester to a new campus by the Genesee River in Henrietta. That same year, the National Technical Institute for the Deaf (NTID) opened as one of RIT's colleges.

In the 1980s, with the completion of Interstate 390 and the building of the Marketplace Mall, Henrietta was developed into one of the major retail shopping destinations in Monroe County.

Henrietta has the following listings on the National Register of Historic Places:

- Andrew Short House
- Antoinette Louisa Brown Blackwell Childhood Home
- Tinker Cobblestone Farmstead.

== Geography ==
Henrietta is in southern Monroe County and is bounded by the following communities:

- The western border of Henrietta is the Genesee River. The west side of the river has the towns of Chili and Wheatland.
- To the north of Henrietta is the town of Brighton. The city of Rochester is north of Henrietta, but does not share a border with the town. Downtown Rochester is 7 miles (11 km) north of the center of Henrietta.
- To the east are the towns of Pittsford and Mendon.
- To the south is the town of Rush.

According to the U.S. Census Bureau, Henrietta has a total area of 35.6 square miles (92 km^{2}). Of this total, 35.3 square miles (91 km^{2}) are land and 0.3 square miles (0.78 km^{2}), or 0.83%, are water. Most of the town drains westward to the Genesee River, but the northeast part of the town drains northeasterly toward Irondequoit Creek. Both streams are north-flowing tributaries of Lake Ontario.

The New York State Thruway (Interstate 90) and Interstate 390 run through Henrietta. A short section of the Erie Canal passes through the northeastern side of the town.

== Government ==
Henrietta's town government consists of a town supervisor and four town board members.

Other boards and commissions in Henrietta include the zoning board, planning board, conservation board, youth board, recreation commission, historic site committee, assessment board, and library board.

== Demographics ==
As of 2020, the population of Henrietta was 47,096.

As of the 2005–2009 American Community Survey, the racial makeup of the town was 81.5% White, 7.9% African American, 0.27% Native American, 5.9% Asian, and 3.1% Hispanic or Latino and 1.4% other.

Historical population
Census	Pop.	Note	%±
1820	2,181		—
1830	2,310		5.9%
1840	2,085		−9.7%
1850	2,513		20.5%
1860	2,249		−10.5%
1870	2,280		1.4%
1880	2,243		−1.6%
1890	2,135		−4.8%
1900	2,062		−3.4%
1910	1,972		−4.4%
1920	1,794		−9.0%
1930	2,142		19.4%
1940	2,728		27.4%
1950	3,385		24.1%
1960	11,598		242.6%
1970	33,017		184.7%
1980	36,134		9.4%
1990	36,376		0.7%
2000	39,028		7.3%
2010	42,581		9.1%
2020	47,096		10.6%
U.S. Decennial Census

The 2000 US census showed a population in Henrietta of 39,028 with 12,823 households and 8,501 families. The population density was 1,102.2 inhabitants per square mile (425.6/km^{2}). There were 13,243 housing units at an average density of 374.0 per square mile (144.4/km^{2}). The racial makeup of the town was 84.3% white, 6.9% African American, .27% Native American, 5.5% Asian, .03% Pacific Islander, .97% from other races, and 17.3% from two or more races. Hispanic or Latino of any race were 3.03% of the population.

There were 12,823 households, out of which 30.6% had children under the age of 18 living with them, 53.8% were married couples living together, 9.2% had a female householder with no husband present, and 33.7% were non-families. 22.7% of all households were made up of individuals, and 6.9% had someone living alone who was 65 years of age or older. The average household size was 2.60 and the average family size was 3.09.

In the town, the population was spread out, with 20.4% under the age of 18, 23.9% from 18 to 24, 26.8% from 25 to 44, 19.6% from 45 to 64, and 9.3% who were 65 years of age or older. The median age was 30 years. For every 100 females, there were 111.7 males. For every 100 females age 18 and over, there were 113.3 males.

The median income for a household in Henrietta was $51,081, and the median income for a family was $60,803. Males had a median income of $39,636 versus $30,271 for females. The per capita income for the town was $19,821. About 3.2% of families and 9.1% of the population were below the poverty line, including 6.3% of those under age 18 and 3.3% of those age 65 or over.

== Communities in Henrietta ==
=== East Henrietta ===
The East Henrietta hamlet is located at the crossroads of East Henrietta (New York State Route 15A) and Lehigh Station roads (New York State Route 253). It was the site of the Monroe Academy, the first secondary school in the county, which later became Rush-Henrietta Senior High School. Also located at this intersection was the Elihu Kirby House (1840), a nationally recognized example of Greek Revival architecture. It has since been relocated to a residential neighborhood near Stone Road in Henrietta.

=== West Henrietta ===
The West Henrietta hamlet is located at the crossroads of West Henrietta (New York State Route 15) and Erie Station roads. This hamlet has several historic buildings:

- West Henrietta Baptist Church, constructed in 1838
- West Henrietta US Postal Service Office/West Henrietta Fire Department building, built in the 1920s as a school house
- Former general store building, built in 1906 and now occupied by a pizza restaurant and apartments
- Former Cartwright Inn building, built as a tavern in 1831. Was a restaurant from 1949 until 2007

=== Riverton ===
Riverton was established in 1973 by the federal government as a planned community.

== Education ==
=== Universities ===
- Rochester Institute of Technology (RIT)
- National Technical Institute for the Deaf (NTID)

=== Schools ===
- Bryant & Stratton College
- Rush-Henrietta Central School District
- School of the Holy Childhood – a non-profit agency for people with developmental disabilities
- Norman Howard School – a day school for children with disabilities
- Continental School of Beauty
- Aab Cardiovascular Research Institute (part of the University of Rochester)

== Notable people ==
- Joseph L. Biehler, U.S. Army major general
- John Birdsell, inventor of the Birdsell Clover Huller and founder of the Birdsell Manufacturing Company
- Antoinette Brown Blackwell, first ordained female minister in the United States
- Shenise Johnson, a former WNBA basketball player
- Samantha Watson, middle-distance runner
