= 2019 WNBA All-Star Game =

Exhibition basketball game

	1	2	3	4	Total
Team Delle Donne	23	40	32	31	126
Team Wilson	39	38	28	24	129
- Date: July 27, 2019
- Arena: Mandalay Bay Events Center
- City: Las Vegas, Nevada
- MVP: Erica Wheeler (Team Wilson)
- Attendance: 9,157
- Network: United States: ABC; Canada: TSN5/SN1

WNBA All-Star Game
< 2018	2021 >

The 2019 WNBA All-Star Game was an exhibition basketball game played on July 27, 2019. The Las Vegas Aces hosted the WNBA All-Star Game for the first time.

== Rosters ==
=== Selection ===
On June 12, the WNBA announced that 2019 would similar roster selection process to the 2018 WNBA All-Star Game. Fans, WNBA players, head coaches, sports writers, and broadcasters would all be able to vote for All Stars. All groups could fill out a ballot of four guards and six front court players. Players and coaches could not vote for members of their own team. Voting began on June 14, 2019, at 2 PM EDT and ended on July 9, 2019, at 2 PM EDT.

The voting was weighted as follows:

Voting group	Vote weight
Fans	50%
WNBA players	25%
Sports media	25%

Players were not allowed to vote for their own teammates. The top 10 players receiving votes based on this weighting would be selected to the All-Star Game. These ten players would be deemed the starters. The starters were revealed on July 11, 2019. After the announcement of the starters, the WNBA's head coaches selected the 12 reserves. Coaches voted for three guards, five frontcourt players, and four players at either position regardless of conference. They could not vote for their own players. The reserves were announced on Monday, July 15. The top two vote-getters were captains of the two All-Star teams and selected their teams from the pool of 8 remaining starters and the 12 reserves. On July 18, it was announced that the selection process would be televised on ESPN2. The selection show aired on July 23, at 9:30 PM ET, prior to the Seattle Storm vs. Las Vegas Aces game that was also televised on ESPN2.

=== Head coaches ===
The head coaches of the two teams will be the head coaches from the two WNBA teams with the best records following games on July 12. On July 11, it was determined that Bill Laimbeer of the Las Vegas Aces and Mike Thibault of the Washington Mystics would be the two All-Star Head Coaches, as their teams had the best records in the WNBA. Laimbeer would coach Team Delle Donne, as the Aces had the best record and Delle Donne had the most All-Star votes. That left Thibault to coach Team Wilson. For both coaches, this was their third time coaching in an All-Star Game.

=== All-Star Pool ===
The players for the All-Star Game were selected by the voting process described above. The starters were announced on July 11, 2019, with Elena Delle Donne and A'ja Wilson leading the vote meaning they would be captains of the two All-Star teams. The player line-up was completed when the reserves were announced on July 15, 2019. On July 22, 2019, the league announced that Napheesa Collier was selected as a replacement player for the injured A'ja Wilson.

Eastern Conference All-Stars
Pos	Player	Team	No. of selections
Players
G	Diamond DeShields	Chicago Sky	1
G	Kia Nurse	New York Liberty	1
G	Allie Quigley	Chicago Sky	3
G	Kristi Toliver	Washington Mystics	3
G	Courtney Vandersloot	Chicago Sky	2
G	Erica Wheeler	Indiana Fever	1
F	Elena Delle Donne	Washington Mystics	6
F	Candice Dupree	Indiana Fever	7
F	Alyssa Thomas	Connecticut Sun	2
F/C	Jonquel Jones	Connecticut Sun	2
C	Tina Charles	New York Liberty	7

Western Conference All-Stars
Pos	Player	Team	No. of selections
Players
G	Chelsea Gray	Los Angeles Sparks	3
G	Jewell Loyd	Seattle Storm	2
G	Kayla McBride	Las Vegas Aces	3
G	Odyssey Sims	Minnesota Lynx	1
F	DeWanna Bonner	Phoenix Mercury	3
F	Natasha Howard	Seattle Storm	1
F	Nneka Ogwumike	Los Angeles Sparks	6
F	A'ja Wilson^{INJ1}	Las Vegas Aces	2
C	Liz Cambage	Las Vegas Aces	3
C	Sylvia Fowles	Minnesota Lynx	6
C	Brittney Griner	Phoenix Mercury	6
F	Napheesa Collier^{REP1}	Minnesota Lynx	1

=== All-Star Selections per team ===
The Las Vegas Aces, Chicago Sky, and Minnesota Lynx led the league with three players selected to the All-Star team. No players were selected from the Atlanta Dream or the Dallas Wings.

Number of All-Star players per team
Team	Number of players
Atlanta Dream	0
Chicago Sky	3
Connecticut Sun	2
Indiana Fever	2
New York Liberty	2
Washington Mystics	2
Dallas Wings	0
Las Vegas Aces	3
Los Angeles Sparks	2
Minnesota Lynx	3
Phoenix Mercury	2
Seattle Storm	2

=== Final rosters ===
Team Delle Donne
Pos	Player	Team	No. of selections
Starters
G	Jewell Loyd	Seattle Storm	2
G	Kia Nurse	New York Liberty	1
F	Elena Delle Donne	Washington Mystics	6
F/C	Jonquel Jones	Connecticut Sun	2
C	Brittney Griner	Phoenix Mercury	6
Reserves
G	Kristi Toliver	Washington Mystics	3
G	Courtney Vandersloot	Chicago Sky	2
F	DeWanna Bonner	Phoenix Mercury	3
F	Nneka Ogwumike	Los Angeles Sparks	6
F	Alyssa Thomas	Connecticut Sun	2
C	Tina Charles	New York Liberty	7
Head coach: Mike Thibault (Washington Mystics)

Team Wilson
Pos	Player	Team	No. of selections
Starters
G	Chelsea Gray	Los Angeles Sparks	3
G	Kayla McBride	Las Vegas Aces	3
F	Natasha Howard	Seattle Storm	1
F	A'ja Wilson^{INJ1}	Las Vegas Aces	2
C	Liz Cambage	Las Vegas Aces	3
Reserves
G	Diamond DeShields	Chicago Sky	1
G	Odyssey Sims	Minnesota Lynx	1
G	Allie Quigley^{ST}	Chicago Sky	3
G	Erica Wheeler	Indiana Fever	1
F	Napheesa Collier^{REP1}	Minnesota Lynx	1
F	Candice Dupree	Indiana Fever	7
C	Sylvia Fowles	Minnesota Lynx	6
Head coach: Bill Laimbeer (Las Vegas Aces)

^TBC Rosters as of July 16, 2019.
^INJ1 A'ja Wilson was unable to play due to injury.
^REP1 Napheesa Collier was selected as Wilson's replacement.
^ST Allie Quigley was selected to start in place of Wilson.

== Game ==
ABC, TSN5/SN1

July 27, 2019
3:30 p.m. ET

Report

Team Wilson 129, Team Delle Donne 126
Scoring by quarter: 39–23, 38–40, 28–32, 24–31
Pts: Wheeler 25; Rebs: Fowles 9 Asts: Gray 10	Pts: Ogwumike 22; Rebs: Jones 13; Asts: Toliver 9

Mandalay Bay Events Center, Las Vegas, Nevada
Attendance: 9,157
Referees:
#42 Roy Gulbeyan
#13 Cheryl Flores
#15 Fatou Cissoko-Stephens

Two rule changes were implemented for the game:

1. A 20-second shot clock.
2. Substitutions were allowed during live play.

== Three-Point Contest & Skills Challenge ==
On June 17, 2019, it was announced that there would be a Three-Point Contest and Skills challenge on July 25, the night before the All-Star game. This marked the first time these two events had been held since 2006.

=== Rules ===
The Three-Point Contest is a two-round, timed competition in which five shooting locations are positioned around the three-point arc. Four racks contain four WNBA balls (each worth one point) and one “money” ball (worth two points). The fifth station is a special “all money ball” rack, which each participant can place at any of the five locations. Every ball on this rack is worth two points. The players have one minute to shoot as many of the 25 balls as they can. The two competitors with the highest scores in the first round advance to the championship round.

The Skills Challenge will be a three-round, obstacle-course competition that tests dribbling, passing, agility and three-point shooting skills. The event will showcase a head-to-head, bracket-style tournament format.

=== Three-Point Contest ===
Position	Player	From	2019 Season 3-point statistics			1st Round	2nd Round
Position	Player	From	Made	Attempted	Percent	1st Round	2nd Round
G	Shekinna Stricklen	Connecticut Sun	45	115	39.1	21	23
G	Kayla McBride	Las Vegas Aces	36	76	47.4	22	22
G	Allie Quigley	Chicago Sky	51	107	47.7	19	—
G	Kia Nurse	New York Liberty	39	110	35.5	14	—
G	Erica Wheeler	Indiana Fever	35	82	42.7	12	—
G	Chelsea Gray	Los Angeles Sparks	23	64	35.9	8	—

=== Skills Challenge ===
1st Round
Courtney Vandersloot (Chicago)	O
Sami Whitcomb (Seattle)	X
Napheesa Collier (Minnesota)	X
Jonquel Jones (Connecticut)	O
Odyssey Sims (Minnesota)	X
Diamond DeShields (Chicago)	O
Elizabeth Williams (Atlanta)	O
Brittney Griner (Phoenix)	X

Semi-Finals
Courtney Vandersloot (Chicago)	X
Jonquel Jones (Connecticut)	O
Diamond DeShields (Chicago)	O
Elizabeth Williams (Atlanta)	X

Final
Jonquel Jones (Connecticut)	X
Diamond DeShields (Chicago)	O
