= 2019 Phoenix Mercury season =

- Head coach: Sandy Brondello
- Arena: Talking Stick Resort Arena

Results
- Record: 15–19 (.441)
- Place: 5th (Western)
- Playoff finish: 8th seed; Lost in 1st Round to Chicago

Media
- Television: Fox Sports Arizona (FS-A)

The 2019 WNBA season was the 23rd season for the Phoenix Mercury franchise of the WNBA. The season tipped off on May 25, 2019 versus the Seattle Storm.

The Mercury's season started with the news that star Diana Taurasi would miss a significant part of the season due to a back procedure. The team started out the season 5–5 by the end of June. This record included a three game losing streak immediately followed by a three game winning streak. July proved more of the same as the team posted a 5–4 record. A two game losing streak split five wins. In August, the team went 5–6, but did secure a playoff spot. Taurasi returned for six games during the season. However, the team finished on a four game losing streak to end the season 15–19. This record earned them the eighth seed in the playoffs.

As the eight seed, the Mercury traveled to the Chicago Sky in the first round. The Mercury are the only eighth seed to win since the WNBA switched to its current playoff format in 2016. However, they could not repeat the feat this season when they lost by 29 points.

The Mercury did well at the end of season awards with Brittney Griner leading the WNBA in scoring, Brianna Turner making the WNBA All-Rookie Team, and Leilani Mitchell winning the WNBA Most Improved Player Award.

== Transactions ==
=== WNBA draft ===
Round	Pick	Player	Nationality	School/Team/Country
1	8	Alanna Smith	Australia	Stanford
2	13	Sophie Cunningham	United States	Missouri
3	32	Arica Carter	United States	Louisville

=== Trades/Roster Changes ===
Date	Details
February 1, 2019	Re-Signed G Briann January
February 1, 2019	Re-Signed G Yvonne Turner
February 6, 2019	Signed G/F Essence Carson
March 21, 2019	Re-Signed F Sancho Lyttle
March 22, 2019	Re-Signed G/F DeWanna Bonner
April 10, 2019	Traded C Marie Gülich to Atlanta for F Brianna Turner
May 21, 2019	Traded G Stephanie Talbot to Minnesota in exchange for Minnesota's second round pick in the 2020 WNBA draft

== Roster ==
2019 Phoenix Mercury roster
Players
Coaches

Pos.	No.	Nat.	Name	Height	Weight	DOB	From	Yrs
F	24	(United States)	Bonner, DeWanna	6' 4" (1.93m)	143 lb (65kg)	1987-08-21	Auburn	9
G	17	(United States)	Carson, Essence	6' 0" (1.83m)	163 lb (74kg)	1986-07-28	Rutgers	11
G	9	(United States)	Cunningham, Sophie	6' 1" (1.85m)	170 lb (77kg)	1996-08-16	Missouri	R
C	42	(United States)	Griner, Brittney	6' 9" (2.06m)	205 lb (93kg)	1990-10-18	Baylor	6
G	12	(United States)	January, Briann	5' 8" (1.73m)	144 lb (65kg)	1987-01-11	Arizona State	10
F	20	(United States)	Little, Camille	6' 2" (1.88m)	180 lb (82kg)	1985-01-18	North Carolina	12
F	31	(Spain)	Lyttle, Sancho	6' 5" (1.96m)	175 lb (79kg)	1983-09-20	Houston	14
G	5	(United States)	Mitchell, Leilani	5' 5" (1.65m)	138 lb (63kg)	1985-06-15	Utah	11
F	11	(Australia)	Smith, Alanna	6' 4" (1.93m)	180 lb (82kg)	1996-11-10	Stanford	R
G/F	3	(United States)	Taurasi, Diana (injured)	6' 0" (1.83m)	163 lb (74kg)	1982-06-11	Connecticut	14
F	21	(United States)	Turner, Brianna	6' 3" (1.91m)	170 lb (77kg)	1996-07-05	Notre Dame	R
G	6	(United States)	Turner, Yvonne	5' 10" (1.78m)	131 lb (59kg)	1987-10-13	Nebraska	2

Head coach
(Australia) Sandy Brondello (Western Sydney)
Assistant coaches
(United States) Julie Hairgrove (Arizona)
(Australia) Penny Taylor
Strength and conditioning coach
(United States) Jonathan Mak (Illinois State)

Legend

- (C) Team captain
- (DP) Unsigned draft pick
- (FA) Free agent
- (S) Suspended
- Injured

== Game log ==
=== Preseason ===
2019 pre-season game log
May: 2–0 (Home: 1–0; Road: 1–0)

Game	Date	Team	Score	High points	High rebounds	High assists	Location Attendance	Record
1	May 11	Los Angeles Sparks	W 82–75	Bonner (20)	Bonner (8)	Smith (5)	Talking Stick Resort Arena; 3,751	1–0
2	May 15	@ Seattle Storm	W 87–84	Tied (15)	Griner (6)	Tied (3)	Angel of the Winds Arena; 3,076	2–0

2019 pre-season schedule

=== Regular season ===
2019 game log
Total: 15–19 (Home: 9–8; Road: 6–11)
May: 1–2 (Home: 1–1; Road: 0–1)

Game	Date	Team	Score	High points	High rebounds	High assists	Location Attendance	Record
1	May 25	@ Seattle Storm	L 68–77	Bonner (31)	Tied (8)	Tied (4)	Angel of the Winds Arena; 8,500	0–1
2	May 31	Las Vegas Aces	W 86–84	Carson (20)	Bonner (12)	Y. Turner (10)	Talking Stick Resort Arena; 14,090	1–1

June : 4–3 (Home: 2–0; Road: 2–3)

Game	Date	Team	Score	High points	High rebounds	High assists	Location Attendance	Record
3	June 6	@ Minnesota Lynx	L 56–58	Bonner (25)	Bonner (8)	3 tied (2)	Target Center; 8,001	1–2
4	June 9	@ Indiana Fever	W 94–87	Griner (26)	Bonner (7)	Mitchell (6)	Bankers Life Fieldhouse; 3,336	2–2
5	June 11	@ Chicago Sky	L 75–82	Bonner (28)	Bonner (12)	Bonner (6)	Wintrust Arena; 4,212	2–3
6	June 14	Los Angeles Sparks	L 68–85	Griner (24)	Griner (13)	January (5)	Talking Stick Resort Arena; 10,381	2–4
7	June 20	@ Dallas Wings	L 54–69	Mitchell (12)	Bonner (8)	January (3)	College Park Center; 4,626	2–5
8	June 23	Los Angeles Sparks	W 82–72	Mitchell (22)	Griner (9)	Mitchell (6)	Talking Stick Resort Arena; 10,132	3–5
9	June 28	Indiana Fever	W 91–69	Griner (23)	3 tied (5)	Mitchell (11)	Talking Stick Resort Arena; 9,435	4–5
10	June 30	@ Seattle Storm	W 69–67	Tied (20)	Tied (7)	Mitchell (4)	Alaska Airlines Arena; 8,002	5–5

July : 5–4 (Home: 3–1; Road: 2–3)

Game	Date	Team	Score	High points	High rebounds	High assists	Location Attendance	Record
11	July 5	New York Liberty	L 76–80	Griner (30)	Griner (8)	Mitchell (4)	Talking Stick Resort Arena; 9,560	5–6
12	July 7	Atlanta Dream	W 65–63	Griner (31)	Bonner (14)	Mitchell (4)	Talking Stick Resort Arena; 9,850	6–6
13	July 10	@ Washington Mystics	W 91–68	Griner (25)	Griner (8)	January (6)	Capital One Arena; 15,377	7–6
14	July 12	@ Connecticut Sun	L 64–79	Bonner (20)	Bonner (8)	January (5)	Mohegan Sun Arena; 6,864	7–7
15	July 14	@ Minnesota Lynx	L 62–75	Bonner (27)	Bonner (7)	Mitchell (5)	Target Center; 8,801	7–8
16	July 17	Dallas Wings	W 69–64	Griner (23)	Bonner (8)	January (5)	Talking Stick Resort Arena; 10,143	8–8
17	July 20	@ Dallas Wings	W 70–66	Griner (17)	Griner (8)	January (4)	College Park Center; 5,471	9–8
18	July 23	Indiana Fever	W 95–77	Tied (22)	Griner (7)	January (7)	Talking Stick Resort Arena; 8,528	10–8
19	July 30	@ Washington Mystics	L 93–99	Griner (30)	Griner (9)	Mitchell (8)	St. Elizabeth's East Arena; 3,819	10–9

August : 5–6 (Home: 3–3; Road: 2–3)

Game	Date	Team	Score	High points	High rebounds	High assists	Location Attendance	Record
20	August 1	@ Connecticut Sun	L 62–68	Bonner (20)	Bonner (10)	Bonner (4)	Mohegan Sun Arena; 6,014	10–10
21	August 4	Washington Mystics	W 103–82	Griner (26)	Griner (9)	Griner (8)	Talking Stick Resort Arena; 9,025	11–10
22	August 8	@ Los Angeles Sparks	L 74–84	Griner (27)	B. Turner (14)	Tied (5)	Staples Center; 10,345	11–11
23	August 10	Dallas Wings	L 77–80	Mitchell (23)	B. Turner (11)	Tied (3)	Talking Stick Resort Arena; 9,717	11–12
24	August 14	Connecticut Sun	L 71–78	Bonner (17)	B. Turner (8)	Y. Turner (4)	Talking Stick Resort Arena; 8,734	11–13
25	August 16	Atlanta Dream	W 77–68	Bonner (27)	Bonner (14)	Mitchell (5)	Talking Stick Resort Arena; 8,480	12–13
26	August 18	New York Liberty	W 78–72	Bonner (30)	Bonner (10)	January (3)	Talking Stick Resort Arena; 9,145	13–13
27	August 20	@ Las Vegas Aces	L 79–84 (OT)	Tied (24)	B. Turner (11)	January (6)	Mandalay Bay Events Center; 5,032	13–14
28	August 25	Chicago Sky	L 86–94	Griner (34)	Bonner (11)	Bonner (5)	Talking Stick Resort Arena; 12,054	13–15
29	August 27	@ New York Liberty	W 95–82	Tied (29)	Griner (10)	Taurasi (10)	Westchester County Center; 1,693	14–15
30	August 29	@ Atlanta Dream	W 65–58	Griner (21)	Tied (8)	Taurasi (8)	State Farm Arena; 3,727	15–15

September : 0–4 (Home: 0–3; Road: 0–1)

Game	Date	Team	Score	High points	High rebounds	High assists	Location Attendance	Record
31	September 1	@ Chicago Sky	L 78–105	Griner (26)	Bonner (12)	Mitchell (6)	Wintrust Arena; 8,845	15–16
32	September 3	Seattle Storm	L 70–82	Griner (22)	Griner (7)	Tied (4)	Talking Stick Resort Arena; 8,724	15–17
33	September 6	Minnesota Lynx	L 69–83	Griner (16)	Griner (7)	Mitchell (4)	Talking Stick Resort Arena; 12,140	15–18
34	September 8	Las Vegas Aces	L 89–98	Griner (24)	Bonner (8)	3 tied (3)	Talking Stick Resort Arena; 13,135	15–19

2019 season schedule

=== Playoffs ===
2019 playoff game log
Total: 0–1 (Home: 0–0; Road: 0–1)
First Round: 0–1 (Home: 0–0; Road: 0–1)

Game	Date	Team	Score	High points	High rebounds	High assists	Location Attendance	Series
1	September 11	@ Chicago Sky	L 76–105	Bonner (21)	Bonner (6)	3 tied (3)	Wintrust Arena; 6,042	0–1

2019 playoff schedule

== Standings ==
#	Western Conference	W	L	PCT	GB	Home	Road	Conf.
1	Los Angeles Sparks (3)	22	12	.647	–	15–2	7–10	10–6
2	Las Vegas Aces (4)	21	13	.618	1	13–4	8–9	11–5
3	Seattle Storm (6)	18	16	.529	4	11–6	7–10	10–6
4	Minnesota Lynx (7)	18	16	.529	4	11–6	7–10	7–9
5	Phoenix Mercury (8)	15	19	.441	7	9–8	6–11	5–11
6	e – Dallas Wings	10	24	.294	12	8–9	2–15	5–11

== Playoffs ==
**First round** Single elimination (Sept. 11)
5	**Chicago Sky**	**105**
8	Phoenix Mercury	76
6	**Seattle Storm**	**84**
7	Minnesota Lynx	74

**Second round** Single elimination (Sept. 15)
4	**Las Vegas Aces**	**93**
5	Chicago Sky	92
3	**Los Angeles Sparks**	**92**
6	Seattle Storm	69

**Semifinals**; Best-of-5 (Sept. 17 – 24)
1	**Washington Mystics**	**3**
4	Las Vegas Aces	1
2	**Connecticut Sun**	**3**
3	Los Angeles Sparks	0

**WNBA Finals**; Best-of-5 (Sept. 29 – Oct. 10)
1	**Washington Mystics**	**3**
2	Connecticut Sun	2

Note: Teams re-seeded after each round.

- **Bold** – Game or series winner
- Italic – Team with home-court advantage

== Statistics ==
Legend
GP	Games played	GS	Games started	MPG	Minutes per game	RPG	Rebounds per game
APG	Assists per game	SPG	Steals per game	BPG	Blocks per game	PPG	Points per game
FG%	Field-goal percentage	3P%	3-point field-goal percentage	FT%	Free-throw percentage	TO	Turnovers per game
PF	Fouls per game		Team leader		League leader

=== Regular season ===
Player	GP	GS	MPG	FG%	3P%	FT%	RPG	APG	SPG	BPG	PPG
Brittney Griner	31	31	32.8	46.4	33.3	80.8	7.2	2.4	0.7	2.0	20.7
DeWanna Bonner	34	34	32.9	37.7	27.2	91.6	7.6	2.7	1.3	0.6	17.2
Leilani Mitchell	32	27	30.3	44.1	43.0	82.9	3.0	4.0	0.9	0.3	12.8
Briann January	32	26	26.6	39.0	37.8	83.7	1.3	3.3	0.8	0.1	6.5
Yvonne Turner	29	14	20.5	34.3	32.9	87.8	2.8	2.3	0.6	0.1	6.4
Essence Carson	23	13	18.5	35.2	34.1	78.4	2.2	1.5	0.5	0.3	5.8
Diana Taurasi	6	6	21.5	10.3	4.2	94.4	3.2	5.3	0.3	0.2	4.3
Brianna Turner	29	12	15.9	53.8	0	73.1	4.1	0.5	0.2	0.7	4.0
Camille Little	29	0	14.7	43.5	33.3	80.6	2.4	0.8	0.4	0.3	3.9
Sophie Cunningham	32	5	12.2	35.4	30.4	88.2	1.4	0.8	0.3	0.1	3.1
Sancho Lyttle	20	2	12.5	41.9	25.0	62.5	2.9	0.3	0.6	0.3	2.9
Alanna Smith	18	0	7.4	19.5	11.1	50.0	1.9	0.2	0.3	0.3	1.1

== Awards and honors ==
Recipient	Award	Date awarded	Ref.
DeWanna Bonner	WNBA Western Conference Player of the Week	June 10, 2019	
Briann January	WNBA Community Assist Award - May	June 27, 2019	
Brittney Griner	WNBA Western Conference Player of the Week	July 8, 2019	
DeWanna Bonner	WNBA All-Star Selection	July 15, 2019	
Brittney Griner	WNBA All-Star Selection	July 15, 2019	
Brittney Griner	WNBA Western Conference Player of the Week	September 3, 2019	
Brittney Griner	WNBA Western Conference Player of the Month - August	September 4, 2019	
Brittney Griner	Peak Performer: Points	September 9, 2019	
Brianna Turner	WNBA All-Rookie Team	September 16, 2019	
Leilani Mitchell	Most Improved Player Award	September 18, 2019	
