= 2019 Seattle Storm season =

- Head coach: Dan Hughes
- Arena: Alaska Airlines Arena; Angel of the Winds Arena

Results
- Record: 18–16 (.529)
- Place: 3rd (Western)
- Playoff finish: 6th Seed; Lost in 2nd Round to Los Angeles

Media
- Television: KZJO (JOEtv)

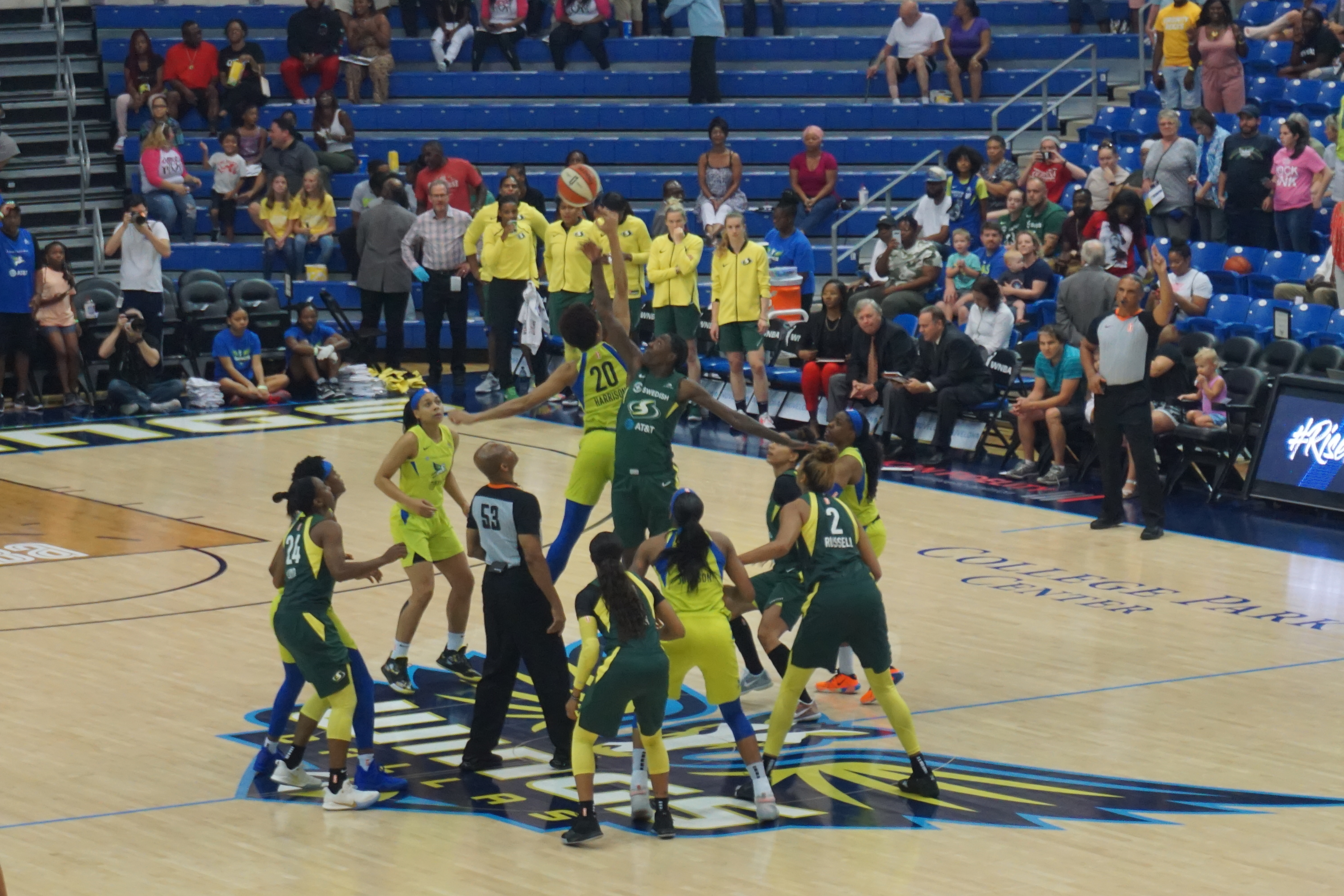
The Storm in action against Dallas

The 2019 WNBA season was the 20th season for the Seattle Storm of the Women's National Basketball Association. The regular season began on May 25 with a game against the Phoenix Mercury.

On August 15, 2018 the Seattle Storm announced that they would play their regular season games at the University of Washington's Alaska Airlines Arena while KeyArena undergoes renovations for the Seattle Kraken of the NHL. The Storm will play five games at the Angel of the Winds Arena in Everett, Washington.

During the preseason, two of the Storm's prominent stars were injured. Breanna Stewart, the 2018 WNBA MVP, ruptured her Achilles tendon while playing in the EuroLeague for Dynamo Kursk. Stewart underwent surgery, and is expected to recover in time for the 2020 season, but miss the entirety of 2019. Sue Bird underwent arthroscopic surgery to remove a loose body in her left knee and would miss the entire 2019 season. Bird was selected to the All Star Game in 2018, and was the team leader in assists.

For the first six games of the season, the Storm alternated winning a game and losing a game. Through the month of June, they could not win more than two games in a row, and finished June with an 8–6 record. July was a streak filled month, with the team winning four games in a row, after starting the month with two home losses to Atlanta Dream and New York Liberty. The Dream and Liberty ended up having the worst records in the WNBA. However, they finished the month with a 12–9 overall record, and an eye toward a playoff berth. August proved difficult as the team went 3–6 during the month. The month ended on a high note when they secured a playoff berth on August 29. They finished the season strong, going 3–1 in September to lock up the number six playoff seed.

As the #6 seed, Seattle hosted the #7 seed Minnesota Lynx in the first round of the playoffs. The Storm were able to advance to the second round with a ten point win. In the second round, the #3 seeded Los Angeles Sparks proved to be too much for the Storm, and their season ended with a twenty three point loss at the Staples Center.

== Transactions ==
=== WNBA draft ===
Round	Pick	Player	Nationality	School/Team/Country
1	12	Ezi Magbegor	Australia	Melbourne Boomers (Australia)
2	24	Anriel Howard	United States	Mississippi State
3	36	Macy Miller	United States	South Dakota State

=== Trades and roster changes ===
Date	Details
February 1, 2019	Re-Signed F Crystal Langhorne
February 1, 2019	Re-Signed C Mercedes Russell
February 7, 2019	Signed Teana Muldrow to Training Camp Contract
April 11, 2019	Signed G Shavonte Zellous
April 18, 2019	Signed F Zykera Rice to Training Camp Contract
April 18, 2019	Signed G Presley Hudson to Training Camp Contract
April 18, 2019	Signed G Receé Caldwell to Training Camp Contract
May 2, 2019	Signed G Brooke Salas to Training Camp Contract

== Roster ==
2019 Seattle Storm roster
Players
Coaches

Pos.	No.	Nat.	Name	Height	Weight	DOB	From	Yrs
G	10	(United States)	Bird, Sue (injured)	5' 9" (1.75m)	150 lb (68kg)	1980-10-16	Connecticut	16
G	21	(United States)	Canada, Jordin	5' 6" (1.68m)		1995-08-11	UCLA	1
F	32	(United States)	Clark, Alysha	5' 11" (1.8m)	167 lb (76kg)	1987-07-07	Middle Tennessee	7
G	12	(United States)	Dietrick, Blake	5' 10" (1.78m)	157 lb (71kg)	1993-07-19	Princeton	2
F	6	(United States)	Howard, Natasha	6' 2" (1.88m)	165 lb (75kg)	1991-09-02	Florida State	5
F/C	1	(United States)	Langhorne, Crystal	6' 2" (1.88m)	185 lb (84kg)	1986-10-27	Maryland	11
G	24	(United States)	Loyd, Jewell	5' 10" (1.78m)	148 lb (67kg)	1993-10-05	Notre Dame	4
F	23	(United States)	Mosqueda-Lewis, Kaleena	5' 11" (1.8m)	180 lb (82kg)	1993-11-03	Connecticut	4
C	3	(United States)	Paris, Courtney	6' 4" (1.93m)	250 lb (113kg)	1987-97-21	Oklahoma	9
G	2	(United States)	Russell, Mercedes	6' 6" (1.98m)		1995-07-27	Tennessee	1
F	30	(United States)	Stewart, Breanna (injured) (S)	6' 4" (1.93m)	170 lb (77kg)	1994-08-27	Connecticut	3
G/F	33	(Australia)	Whitcomb, Sami	5' 10" (1.78m)	145 lb (66kg)	1988-07-20	Washington	2
G	11	(Croatia)	Zellous, Shavonte	5' 10" (1.78m)	188 lb (85kg)	1986-08-28	Pittsburgh	10

Head coach
(United States) Dan Hughes (Muskingum)
Assistant coaches
(United States) Gary Kloppenburg (UC San Diego)
(United States) Noelle Quinn (UCLA)
Athletic trainer
(United States) Tom Spencer (Central Washington)

Legend

- (C) Team captain
- (DP) Unsigned draft pick
- (FA) Free agent
- (S) Suspended
- Injured

== Game log ==
=== Preseason ===
2019 pre-season game log
May: 0–2 (Home: 0–1; Road: 0–1)

Game	Date	Team	Score	High points	High rebounds	High assists	Location Attendance	Record
1	May 15	Phoenix Mercury	L 84–87	Tied (15)	Tied (7)	Canada (5)	Angel of the Winds Arena; 3,076	0–1
2	May 17	@ Los Angeles Sparks	L 85–92	Canada (18)	Russell (9)	Canada (6)	Hutto-Patterson Gym; N/A	0–2

2019 pre-season schedule

=== Regular season ===
2019 game log
Total: 18–16 (Home: 11–6; Road: 7–10)
May: 2–1 (Home: 1–0; Road: 1–1)

Game	Date	Team	Score	High points	High rebounds	High assists	Location Attendance	Record
1	May 25	Phoenix Mercury	W 77–68	Howard (21)	Howard (16)	Canada (6)	Angel of the Winds Arena; 8,500	1–0
2	May 29	@ Minnesota Lynx	L 61–72	Howard (18)	Tied (5)	Canada (4)	Target Center; 8,092	1–1
3	May 31	@ Atlanta Dream	W 82–66	Howard (19)	Howard (14)	Canada (7)	State Farm Arena; 2,119	2–1

June : 6–5 (Home: 4–1; Road: 2–4)

Game	Date	Team	Score	High points	High rebounds	High assists	Location Attendance	Record
4	June 1	@ Chicago Sky	L 79–83	Howard (21)	Howard (9)	Canada (6)	Wintrust Arena; 7,063	2–2
5	June 4	Minnesota Lynx	W 84–77	Loyd (19)	Howard (6)	Canada (7)	Angel of the Winds Arena; 5,711	3–2
6	June 9	@ Chicago Sky	L 71–78	Tied (20)	Tied (6)	Canada (5)	Wintrust Arena; 5,032	3–3
7	June 11	@ Indiana Fever	W 84–82	Howard (26)	Howard (9)	Tied (6)	Bankers Life Fieldhouse; 3,506	4–3
8	June 14	@ Washington Mystics	W 74–71	Howard (19)	Tied (11)	Clark (5)	St. Elizabeth's East Arena; 3,654	5–3
10	June 16	@ Connecticut Sun	L 67–81	Howard (20)	Howard (8)	Tied (3)	Mohegan Sun Arena; 7,773	5–4
11	June 21	Los Angeles Sparks	W 84–62	Loyd (23)	Clark (10)	Tied (3)	Angel of the Winds Arena; 6,114	6–4
12	June 23	Indiana Fever	W 65–61	Loyd (21)	Tied (6)	Howard (4)	Alaska Airlines Arena; 7,211	7–4
12	June 25	@ Las Vegas Aces	L 56–60	Howard (14)	Howard (12)	3 tied (3)	Mandalay Bay Events Center; 4,215	7–5
13	June 28	Chicago Sky	W 79–76	Canada (17)	Howard (9)	Tied (3)	Alaska Airlines Arena; 7,915	8–5
14	June 30	Phoenix Mercury	L 67–69	Whitcomb (13)	Howard (8)	Howard (5)	Alaska Airlines Arena; 8,002	8–6

July : 4–3 (Home: 3–2; Road: 1–1)

Game	Date	Team	Score	High points	High rebounds	High assists	Location Attendance	Record
15	July 3	New York Liberty	L 83–84	Russell (19)	Clark (9)	Canada (7)	Alaska Airlines Arena; 8,710	8–7
16	July 5	Atlanta Dream	L 66–77	Howard (20)	Russell (9)	Whitcomb (5)	Alaska Airlines Arena; 8,111	8–8
17	July 12	Dallas Wings	W 95–81	Mosqueda-Lewis (18)	Russell (8)	Canada (12)	Alaska Airlines Arena; 6,451	9–8
18	July 14	New York Liberty	W 78–69	Langhorne (19)	Canada (9)	Canada (8)	Alaska Airlines Arena; 6,733	10–8
19	July 17	@ Minnesota Lynx	W 90–79	Howard (33)	Russell (9)	Whitcomb (8)	Target Center; 8,403	11–8
20	July 19	Las Vegas Aces	W 69–66	Howard (21)	Howard (10)	Canada (4)	Alaska Airlines Arena; 9,000	12–8
21	July 23	@ Las Vegas Aces	L 62–79	Tied (13)	Howard (10)	Clark (4)	Mandalay Bay Events Center; 5,193	12–9

August : 3–6 (Home: 2–3; Road: 1–3)

Game	Date	Team	Score	High points	High rebounds	High assists	Location Attendance	Record
22	August 2	Washington Mystics	L 79–99	Howard (26)	3 tied (6)	Canada (6)	Angel of the Winds Arena; 7,488	12–10
23	August 4	@ Los Angeles Sparks	L 75–83	Tied (16)	Russell (9)	Howard (5)	Staples Center; 12,820	12–11
24	August 8	Dallas Wings	W 69–57	Howard (23)	Howard (11)	Canada (6)	Angel of the Winds Arena; 6,268	13–11
25	August 11	@ New York Liberty	W 84–69	Clark (21)	Tied (8)	Russell (6)	Barclays Center; 7,715	14–11
26	August 14	@ Washington Mystics	L 59–88	Howard (24)	Howard (8)	Howard (4)	St. Elizabeth's East Arena; 3,917	14–12
27	August 16	@ Connecticut Sun	L 78–79	Howard (27)	Howard (10)	3 tied (4)	Mohegan Sun Arena; 7,092	14–13
28	August 18	Minnesota Lynx	W 82–74	Canada (14)	Tied (6)	Canada (6)	Alaska Airlines Arena; 9,000	15–13
29	August 25	Indiana Fever	L 54–63	Howard (14)	Howard (9)	Howard (5)	Alaska Airlines Arena; 8,076	15–14
30	August 27	Connecticut Sun	L 89–70	Loyd (18)	Howard (7)	Canada (5)	Alaska Airlines Arena; 6,258	15–15

September : 3–1 (Home: 1–0; Road: 2–1)

Game	Date	Team	Score	High points	High rebounds	High assists	Location Attendance	Record
31	September 1	Atlanta Dream	W 92–75	Canada (21)	Tied (8)	Canada (8)	Alaska Airlines Arena; 9,000	16–15
32	September 3	@ Phoenix Mercury	W 82–70	Howard (22)	Howard (12)	Canada (10)	Talking Stick Resort Arena; 8,724	17–15
33	September 5	@ Los Angeles Sparks	L 68–102	Tied (13)	Russell (8)	Howard (4)	Staples Center; 10,591	17–16
34	September 8	@ Dallas Wings	W 78–64	Howard (22)	Howard (9)	Tied (5)	College Park Center; 5,910	18–16

2019 season schedule

=== Playoffs ===
2019 playoff game log
Total: 1–1 (Home: 1–0; Road: 0–1)
First Round: 1–0 (Home: 1–0; Road: 0–0)

Game	Date	Team	Score	High points	High rebounds	High assists	Location Attendance	Series
1	September 11	Minnesota Lynx	W 84–74	Canada (26)	Russell (9)	Howard (6)	Angel of the Winds Arena; 5,011	1–0

Second Round: 0–1 (Home: 0–0; Road: 0–1)

Game	Date	Team	Score	High points	High rebounds	High assists	Location Attendance	Series
1	September 15	Los Angeles Sparks	L 69–92	Howard (20)	Howard (11)	Canada (7)	Staples Center; 9,081	0–1

2019 playoff schedule

== Awards and honors ==
Recipient	Award	Date awarded	Ref.
Natasha Howard	WNBA Western Conference Player of the Week	June 3, 2019	
Natasha Howard	WNBA Western Conference Player of the Week	June 17, 2019	
Natasha Howard	WNBA Western Conference Player of the Month - June	July 1, 2019	
Jewell Loyd	WNBA All-Star Selection	July 15, 2019	
Natasha Howard	WNBA All-Star Selection	July 15, 2019	
Natasha Howard	WNBA Western Conference Player of the Week	July 22, 2019	
Natasha Howard	Defensive Player of the Year Award	September 11, 2019	

== Standings ==
#	Western Conference	W	L	PCT	GB	Home	Road	Conf.
1	Los Angeles Sparks (3)	22	12	.647	–	15–2	7–10	10–6
2	Las Vegas Aces (4)	21	13	.618	1	13–4	8–9	11–5
3	Seattle Storm (6)	18	16	.529	4	11–6	7–10	10–6
4	Minnesota Lynx (7)	18	16	.529	4	11–6	7–10	7–9
5	Phoenix Mercury (8)	15	19	.441	7	9–8	6–11	5–11
6	e – Dallas Wings	10	24	.294	12	8–9	2–15	5–11

Notes

(#) – Conference Standing, Playoff Seeds shown to the right of team name
e – Eliminated from playoffs

== Playoffs ==
**First round** Single elimination (Sept. 11)
5	**Chicago Sky**	**105**
8	Phoenix Mercury	76
6	**Seattle Storm**	**84**
7	Minnesota Lynx	74

**Second round** Single elimination (Sept. 15)
4	**Las Vegas Aces**	**93**
5	Chicago Sky	92
3	**Los Angeles Sparks**	**92**
6	Seattle Storm	69

**Semifinals**; Best-of-5 (Sept. 17 – 24)
1	**Washington Mystics**	**3**
4	Las Vegas Aces	1
2	**Connecticut Sun**	**3**
3	Los Angeles Sparks	0

**WNBA Finals**; Best-of-5 (Sept. 29 – Oct. 10)
1	**Washington Mystics**	**3**
2	Connecticut Sun	2

Note: Teams re-seeded after each round.

- **Bold** – Game or series winner
- Italic – Team with home-court advantage

== Statistics ==
Legend
GP	Games played	GS	Games started	MPG	Minutes per game	RPG	Rebounds per game
APG	Assists per game	SPG	Steals per game	BPG	Blocks per game	PPG	Points per game
FG%	Field-goal percentage	3P%	3-point field-goal percentage	FT%	Free-throw percentage	TO	Turnovers per game
PF	Fouls per game		Team leader		League leader

=== Regular season ===
Player	GP	GS	MPG	FG%	3P%	FT%	RPG	APG	SPG	BPG	PPG
Natasha Howard	34	34	31.4	43.9	30.8	81.0	8.2	2.1	2.2	1.7	18.1
Jewell Loyd	27	21	25.4	39.1	33.7	92.8	2.7	2.0	1.3	0.1	12.3
Jordin Canada	30	29	28.8	38.8	18.6	76.8	2.4	5.2	2.3	0.2	9.8
Alysha Clark	31	30	28.4	48.1	48.1	81.8	4.7	2.5	1.1	0.5	9.6
Mercedes Russell	34	30	25.6	51.7	0.0	64.6	6.1	1.0	1.1	0.5	7.5
Sami Whitcomb	33	13	20.4	36.8	34.2	100	1.7	2.4	1.1	0.1	7.2
Crystal Langhorne	34	4	17.0	40.9	31.6	75.0	3.1	1.0	0.3	0.3	5.6
Kaleena Mosqueda-Lewis	31	4	14.0	39.9	34.1	100	1.2	0.5	0.3	0.2	5.5
Shavonte Zellous	31	4	13.9	37.6	18.8	75.0	1.5	1.5	0.3	0.2	4.0
Courtney Paris	30	0	6.3	40.0	0	42.9	1.7	0.4	0.3	0.1	0.5
Blake Dietrick	17	1	6.2	10.0	0	66.7	0.6	0.9	0.2	0.1	0.4
