= 2019 Connecticut Sun season =

- Head coach: Curt Miller
- Arena: Mohegan Sun Arena

Results
- Record: 23–11 (.676)
- Place: 2nd (Eastern)
- Playoff finish: 2nd seed; lost in WNBA Finals to Washington Mystics 2-3

Media
- Television: NESN

The 2019 WNBA season was the 21st season for the Connecticut Sun franchise of the WNBA. It was also the 17th season for the franchise in Connecticut. The team opened the season on May 25 versus the Washington Mystics.

The Sun started the season well, posting a 9–4 record through the end of June. They were especially strong at home, going 6–0 over the first two months of the season. The end of June into the beginning of July proved to be a rough patch for the team. They lost five straight games from June 23 to July 10. This stretch included one of only two home losses on the season. After this losing streak, the Sun went on a seven game winning streak that lasted from July 12 to August 4. The Sun's final record in July was 5–2. The Sun didn't lose in August and posted an 8–3 record. The Sun's other home loss came on September 6 as the team closed out the season 1–2 in September. The Sun clinched a playoff berth on August 18, and their final 23–11 record earned them the second seed in the playoffs.

As the second seed, the Sun earned a bye through to the Semifinals. There, they met the #3 seed Los Angeles Sparks. The Sun proved to be too much for the Sparks, sweeping them three games to none. They advanced to the finals where they faced off against the #1 seed Washington Mystics. In a tightly contested finals, the Sun ultimately came up short, losing two games to three.

== Transactions ==
=== WNBA draft ===
The Sun made the following selections in the 2019 WNBA draft.

Round	Pick	Player	Nationality	School/Team/Country
1	9	Kristine Anigwe	United States	California
2	21	Bridget Carleton	Canada	Iowa State
3	33	Regan Magarity	Sweden	Virginia Tech

=== Trades/Roster Changes ===
Date	Details
February 7, 2019	Re-signed G Jasmine Thomas
February 27, 2019	Signed F Ariel Edwards to Training Camp Contract
March 22, 2019	Signed G Brianna Kiesel to Training Camp Contract
April 10, 2019	Traded G Lexie Brown to Minnesota in exchange for G Natisha Hiedeman.
April 11, 2019	Signed F Emma Cannon to Training Camp Contract
April 27, 2019	Traded F Chiney Ogwumike to Sparks in exchange for the Spark's first round pick in the 2020 WNBA draft
May 7, 2019	Waived F Ariel Edwards and G Brianna Kiesel
August 6, 2019	Traded C/F Kristine Anigwe to Dallas Wings for C/F Theresa Plaisance

== Roster ==
2019 Connecticut Sun roster
Players
Coaches

Pos.	No.	Nat.	Name	Height	Weight	DOB	From	Yrs
G	1	(United States)	Banham, Rachel	5' 9" (1.75m)	168 lb (76kg)	1993-07-15	Minnesota	3
G	23	(United States)	Clarendon, Layshia	5' 9" (1.75m)	158 lb (72kg)	1991-05-02	California	6
G	2	(United States)	Hiedeman, Natisha	5' 7" (1.7m)	125 lb (57kg)	1997-02-10	Marquette	R
G	32	(United States)	Holmes, Bria	6' 1" (1.85m)	170 lb (77kg)	1994-04-19	West Virginia	2
F/C	35	(The Bahamas)	Jones, Jonquel	6' 6" (1.98m)	190 lb (86kg)	1994-01-05	George Washington	3
F	42	(United States)	Jones, Brionna	6' 3" (1.91m)	230 lb (104kg)	1995-12-18	Maryland	2
F/C	55	(United States)	Plaisance, Theresa	6' 5" (1.96m)	200 lb (91kg)	1992-05-18	LSU	5
G/F	40	(United States)	Stricklen, Shekinna	6' 2" (1.88m)	178 lb (81kg)	1990-07-30	Tennessee	7
F	25	(United States)	Thomas, Alyssa	6' 2" (1.88m)	185 lb (84kg)	1992-04-12	Maryland	5
G	5	(United States)	Thomas, Jasmine	5' 9" (1.75m)	145 lb (66kg)	1989-09-30	Duke	8
F	33	(United States)	Tuck, Morgan	6' 2" (1.88m)	200 lb (91kg)	1994-04-30	Connecticut	3
G	10	(United States)	Williams, Courtney	5' 8" (1.73m)	136 lb (62kg)	1994-05-11	South Florida	3

Head coach
(United States) Curt Miller (Baldwin Wallace)
Assistant coaches
(United States) Brandi Poole
(United States) Chris Koclanes

Legend

- (C) Team captain
- (DP) Unsigned draft pick
- (FA) Free agent
- (S) Suspended
- Injured

== Game log ==
=== Preseason ===
2019 pre-season game log
May: 2–1 (Home: 1–1; Road: 1–0)

Game	Date	Team	Score	High points	High rebounds	High assists	Location Attendance	Record
1	May 13	New York Liberty	W 100–66	J. Jones (19)	J. Thomas (7)	Williams (7)	Mohegan Sun Arena; 3,806	1–0
2	May 14	Dallas Wings	L 67–71	Holmes (14)	J. Jones (14)	Stricklen (4)	Mohegan Sun Arena; 3,965	1–1
3	May 19	vs. New York Liberty	W 98–79	J. Jones (21)	Williams (5)	Williams (5)	Times Union Center	2–1

2019 pre-season schedule

=== Regular season ===
2019 game log
Total: 23–11 (Home: 15–2; Road: 8–9)
May: 2–1 (Home: 2–0; Road: 0–1)

Game	Date	Team	Score	High points	High rebounds	High assists	Location Attendance	Record
1	May 25	Washington Mystics	W 84–69	A. Thomas (23)	J. Jones (14)	J. Thomas (6)	Mohegan Sun Arena; 7,913	1–0
2	May 28	Indiana Fever	W 88–77	J. Jones (25)	A. Thomas (10)	J. Thomas (7)	Mohegan Sun Arena; 4,781	2–0
3	May 31	@ Los Angeles Sparks	L 70–77	J. Jones (16)	J. Jones (22)	Clarendon (3)	Staples Center; 12,334	2–1

June : 7–3 (Home: 4–0; Road: 3–3)

Game	Date	Team	Score	High points	High rebounds	High assists	Location Attendance	Record
4	June 2	@ Las Vegas Aces	W 80–74	Williams (19)	J. Jones (13)	Tied (5)	Mandalay Bay Events Center; 2,747	3–1
5	June 6	Los Angeles Sparks	W 89–77	J. Jones (18)	A. Thomas (12)	A. Thomas (6)	Mohegan Sun Arena; 5,496	4–1
6	June 9	@ Atlanta Dream	W 65–59	J. Jones (17)	J. Jones (13)	J. Thomas (6)	State Farm Arena; 3,082	5–1
7	June 11	Washington Mystics	W 83–75	J. Jones (24)	A. Thomas (12)	J. Thomas (6)	Mohegan Sun Arena; 5,224	6–1
8	June 14	@ Minnesota Lynx	W 85–81	3 tied (16)	J. Jones (12)	Williams (6)	Target Center; 8,803	7–1
9	June 16	Seattle Storm	W 81–67	A. Thomas (20)	J. Jones (11)	J. Jones (6)	Mohegan Sun Arena; 7,773	8–1
10	June 21	Atlanta Dream	W 86–76	Stricklen (24)	J. Jones (8)	J. Thomas (9)	Mohegan Sun Arena; 6,608	9–1
11	June 23	@ Chicago Sky	L 75–93	A. Thomas (13)	J. Jones (10)	J. Thomas (7)	Wintrust Arena; 5,607	9–2
12	June 26	@ Dallas Wings	L 73–74	A. Thomas (28)	Williams (7)	J. Thomas (11)	College Park Center; 4,017	9–3
13	June 29	@ Washington Mystics	L 59–102	J. Jones (15)	J. Jones (7)	J. Thomas (5)	St. Elizabeth's East Arena; 4,200	9–4

July : 5–2 (Home: 4–1; Road: 1–1)

Game	Date	Team	Score	High points	High rebounds	High assists	Location Attendance	Record
14	July 6	Minnesota Lynx	L 71–74	J. Thomas (16)	Tied (9)	J. Thomas (5)	Mohegan Sun Arena; 8,076	9–5
15	July 10	@ Atlanta Dream	L 75–78	Williams (13)	Tied (9)	6 tied (2)	State Farm Arena; 3,866	9–6
16	July 12	Phoenix Mercury	W 79–64	A. Thomas (20)	J. Jones (11)	J. Thomas (8)	Mohegan Sun Arena; 6,864	10–6
17	July 14	@ Indiana Fever	W 76–63	J. Jones (26)	J. Jones (8)	J. Thomas (6)	Bankers Life Fieldhouse; 6,434	11–6
18	July 19	Atlanta Dream	W 98–69	Holmes (17)	J. Jones (9)	Williams (5)	Mohegan Sun Arena; 6,733	12–6
19	July 24	New York Liberty	W 70–63	J. Thomas (18)	A. Thomas (12)	J. Thomas (7)	Mohegan Sun Arena; 8,249	13–6
20	July 30	Chicago Sky	W 100–94	J. Jones (27)	J. Jones (11)	J. Thomas (8)	Mohegan Sun Arena; 6,358	14–6

August : 8–3 (Home: 4–0; Road: 4–3)

Game	Date	Team	Score	High points	High rebounds	High assists	Location Attendance	Record
21	August 1	Phoenix Mercury	W 68–62	J. Jones (15)	J. Jones (14)	Williams (5)	Mohegan Sun Arena; 6,014	15–6
22	August 4	@ New York Liberty	W 94–79	Williams (28)	J. Jones (10)	Williams (6)	Westchester County Center; 1,927	16–6
23	August 9	@ Minnesota Lynx	L 57–89	Holmes (10)	A. Thomas (7)	3 tied (2)	Target Center; 8,892	16–7
24	August 11	@ Las Vegas Aces	L 81–89	Williams (13)	J. Jones (12)	Tied (4)	Mandalay Bay Events Center; 4,633	16–8
25	August 14	@ Phoenix Mercury	W 78–71	J. Thomas (18)	J. Jones (14)	Tied (4)	Talking Stick Resort Arena; 8,734	17–8
26	August 16	Seattle Storm	W 79–78	Stricklen (24)	A. Thomas (11)	J. Thomas (7)	Mohegan Sun Arena; 7,092	18–8
27	August 18	Dallas Wings	W 78–68	Williams (18)	J. Jones (10)	J. Thomas (9)	Mohegan Sun Arena; 7,275	19–8
28	August 23	Las Vegas Aces	W 89–85	A. Thomas (27)	A. Thomas (12)	J. Thomas (8)	Mohegan Sun Arena; 7,483	20–8
29	August 25	@ Los Angeles Sparks	L 72–84	Williams (18)	J. Jones (12)	Tied (5)	Staples Center; 17,076	20–9
30	August 27	@ Seattle Storm	W 89–70	A. Thomas (22)	A. Thomas (11)	Tied (4)	Alaska Airlines Arena; 6,258	21–9
31	August 30	@ New York Liberty	W 94–84	Williams (26)	A. Thomas (9)	J. Thomas (7)	Westchester County Center; 1,791	22–9

September : 1–2 (Home: 1–1; Road: 0–1)

Game	Date	Team	Score	High points	High rebounds	High assists	Location Attendance	Record
32	September 4	Dallas Wings	W 102–72	J. Jones (22)	Williams (8)	Hiedeman (9)	Mohegan Sun Arena; 6,284	23-9
33	September 6	Chicago Sky	L 104–109	Williams (25)	Tied (9)	Williams (9)	Mohegan Sun Arena; 8,077	23–10
34	September 8	@ Indiana Fever	L 76–104	B. Jones (14)	B. Jones (10)	Williams (4)	Bankers Life Fieldhouse; 5,451	23–11

2019 season schedule

=== Playoffs ===
2019 playoff game log
Total: 5–3 (Home: 3–1; Road: 2–2)
Semifinals: 3–0 (Home: 2–0; Road: 1–0)

Game	Date	Team	Score	High points	High rebounds	High assists	Location Attendance	Series
1	September 17	Los Angeles Sparks	W 84–75	A. Thomas (22)	A. Thomas (10)	J. Thomas (8)	Mohegan Sun Arena; 7,102	1–0
2	September 19	Los Angeles Sparks	W 94–68	J. Jones (27)	Tied (13)	J. Thomas (7)	Mohegan Sun Arena; 8,051	2–0
3	September 22	@ Los Angeles Sparks	W 78–56	J. Thomas (29)	Williams (13)	A. Thomas (6)	Walter Pyramid; 4,000	3–0

WNBA Finals: 2–3 (Home: 1–1; Road: 1–2)

Game	Date	Team	Score	High points	High rebounds	High assists	Location Attendance	Series
1	September 29	@ Washington Mystics	L 86–95	Williams (26)	Tied (6)	A. Thomas (6)	St. Elizabeth's East Arena; 4,200	0–1
2	October 1	@ Washington Mystics	W 99–87	J. Jones (32)	J. Jones (18)	Tied (6)	St. Elizabeth's East Arena; 4,200	1–1
3	October 6	Washington Mystics	L 81–94	Tied (16)	J. Jones (9)	A. Thomas (9)	Mohegan Sun Arena; 9,170	1–2
4	October 8	Washington Mystics	W 90–86	J. Jones (18)	J. Jones (13)	A. Thomas (11)	Mohegan Sun Arena; 8,458	2–2
5	October 10	@ Washington Mystics	L 78–89	J. Jones (25)	A. Thomas (12)	Tied (6)	St. Elizabeth's East Arena; 4,200	2–3

2019 playoff schedule

== Standings ==
#	Eastern Conference	W	L	PCT	GB	Home	Road	Conf.
1	Washington Mystics (1)	26	8	.765	–	14–3	12–5	13–3
2	Connecticut Sun (2)	23	11	.676	3	15–2	8–9	11–5
3	Chicago Sky (5)	20	14	.588	6	12–5	8–9	11–5
4	e –Indiana Fever	13	21	.382	13	7–10	6–11	7–9
5	e –New York Liberty	10	24	.294	16	4–13	6–11	3–13
6	e –Atlanta Dream	8	26	.235	18	5–12	3–14	3–13

== Playoffs ==
**First round** Single elimination (Sept. 11)
5	**Chicago Sky**	**105**
8	Phoenix Mercury	76
6	**Seattle Storm**	**84**
7	Minnesota Lynx	74

**Second round** Single elimination (Sept. 15)
4	**Las Vegas Aces**	**93**
5	Chicago Sky	92
3	**Los Angeles Sparks**	**92**
6	Seattle Storm	69

**Semifinals**; Best-of-5 (Sept. 17 – 24)
1	**Washington Mystics**	**3**
4	Las Vegas Aces	1
2	**Connecticut Sun**	**3**
3	Los Angeles Sparks	0

**WNBA Finals**; Best-of-5 (Sept. 29 – Oct. 10)
1	**Washington Mystics**	**3**
2	Connecticut Sun	2

Note: Teams re-seeded after each round.

- **Bold** – Game or series winner
- Italic – Team with home-court advantage

== Statistics ==
Legend
GP	Games played	GS	Games started	MPG	Minutes per game	RPG	Rebounds per game
APG	Assists per game	SPG	Steals per game	BPG	Blocks per game	PPG	Points per game
FG%	Field-goal percentage	3P%	3-point field-goal percentage	FT%	Free-throw percentage	TO	Turnovers per game
PF	Fouls per game		Team leader		League leader

=== Regular season ===
Player	GP	GS	MPG	FG%	3P%	FT%	RPG	APG	SPG	BPG	PPG
Jonquel Jones	34	34	28.8	44.8	30.9	81.8	9.7	1.5	1.3	2.0	14.6
Courtney Williams	34	34	29.1	43.5	45.7	80.0	5.6	3.8	1.4	0.4	13.2
Alyssa Thomas	34	34	30.2	50.5	0	49.6	7.8	3.1	1.9	0.4	11.6
Jasmine Thomas	34	34	29.7	39.2	36.6	80.0	2.9	5.1	1.4	0.1	11.1
Shekinna Stricklen	34	34	23.7	40.8	38.2	81.5	1.9	1.1	1.0	0.2	9.0
Bria Holmes	34	0	15.6	39.9	31.7	67.2	1.4	0.9	0.5	0.2	6.3
Layshia Clarendon	9	0	15.3	41.9	100	85.7	2.4	2.1	0.3	0	6.2
Morgan Tuck	33	0	10.7	38.8	35.7	60.0	2.0	0.8	0.4	0.1	3.7
Natisha Hiedeman	20	0	10.3	41.4	46.4	50.0	1.5	1.9	0.4	0.1	3.7
Rachel Banham	29	0	12.2	32.2	30.6	69.2	1.0	0.9	0.3	0.1	3.6
Brionna Jones	27	0	8.4	46.7	0	66.7	2.2	0.3	0.3	0.3	3.5
Theresa Plaisance	9	0	7.1	34.8	33.3	100	1.8	0	0.3	0.2	2.4

== Awards and honors ==
Recipient	Award	Date awarded	Ref.
Jonquel Jones	WNBA Eastern Conference Player of the Week	June 3, 2019	
Jonquel Jones	WNBA Eastern Conference Player of the Week	June 10, 2019	
Jonquel Jones	WNBA Eastern Conference Player of the Week	June 17, 2019	
Jonquel Jones	WNBA Eastern Conference Player of the Week	July 15, 2019	
Alyssa Thomas	WNBA All-Star Selection	July 15, 2019	
Jonquel Jones	WNBA All-Star Selection	July 15, 2019	
Courtney Williams	WNBA Eastern Conference Player of the Week	September 3, 2019	
Jonquel Jones	Peak Performer: Rebounds	September 9, 2019	
