= 2019 Indiana Fever season =

20th season in the WNBA

- Head coach: Pokey Chatman
- Arena: Bankers Life Fieldhouse

Results
- Record: 13–21 (.382)
- Place: 4th (Eastern)
- Playoff finish: Did not qualify

Media
- Television: Fox Sports Indiana, WNDY-TV, ESPN2, NBATV

The 2019 Indiana Fever season was the franchise's 20th season in the WNBA and their 3rd and final season under head coach, Pokey Chatman. The Fever opened the season on May 24, 2019, against the New York Liberty.

The Fever had a promising start to their season, winning three of their first four games. However, from there they lost eight of their next ten to finish June with a 5–9 record. July proved disastrous for any playoff hopes the team had. Six losses in the month were book-ended by two wins. One bright spot from July was that Erica Wheeler was named WNBA All-Star Game MVP. The Fever's form improved into August where they posted a 4–5 record. Winning their last two games proved too little too late, as they missed out on a playoff spot for the third straight year.

After the season, it was announced that General Manager and Head Coach Pokey Chatman would not return for the 2020 season.

== Transactions ==
=== WNBA draft ===
The Fever made three selections in the 2019 WNBA draft, which was held on April 10:

Round	Pick	Player	Nationality	School/Team/Country
1	3	Teaira McCowan	United States	Mississippi State
3	25	Paris Kea	United States	North Carolina
3	28	Caliya Robinson	United States	Georgia

=== Trades and roster changes ===
Date	Details
February 1, 2019	Signed F Natalie Achonwa
February 1, 2019	Signed G Shenise Johnson
February 1, 2019	Signed Erica Wheeler
February 5, 2019	Signed G/F Betnijah Laney
February 18, 2019	Signed F Asia Taylor to Training Camp Contract
April 12, 2019	Signed G Crystal Bradford to Training Camp Contract
April 12, 2019	Signed G Bria Gross to Training Camp Contract

== Roster ==
2019 Indiana Fever roster
Players
Coaches

Pos.	No.	Nat.	Name	Height	Weight	DOB	From	Yrs
F	11	(Canada)	Achonwa, Natalie	6' 3" (1.91m)	190 lb (86kg)	1992-11-22	Notre Dame	4
G	25	(United States)	Burke, Kennedy	6' 1" (1.85m)	182 lb (83kg)	1997-08-16	UCLA	R
F	4	(United States)	Dupree, Candice	6' 2" (1.88m)	178 lb (81kg)	1984-02-25	Temple	13
G	42	(United States)	Johnson, Shenise	5' 11" (1.8m)	172 lb (78kg)	1990-12-09	Miami (FL)	6
G	7	(United States)	Kea, Paris	5' 9" (1.75m)	142 lb (64kg)	1996-04-07	North Carolina	R
G	44	(United States)	Laney, Betnijah	6' 0" (1.83m)	160 lb (73kg)	1993-10-29	Rutgers	3
F	23	(United States)	Mavunga, Stephanie	6' 3" (1.91m)	205 lb (93kg)	1995-02-24	Ohio State	1
F	22	(United States)	McCall, Erica	6' 2" (1.88m)	184 lb (83kg)	1995-08-21	Stanford	2
C	15	(United States)	McCowan, Teaira	6' 7" (2.01m)	239 lb (108kg)	1996-09-28	Mississippi State	R
G	3	(United States)	Mitchell, Tiffany	5' 9" (1.75m)	152 lb (69kg)	1994-09-23	South Carolina	4
G	0	(United States)	Mitchell, Kelsey	5' 11" (1.8m)	151 lb (68kg)	1995-11-12	Ohio State	1
G	35	(United States)	Vivians, Victoria	6' 1" (1.85m)	183 lb (83kg)	1994-11-17	Mississippi State	1
G	17	(United States)	Wheeler, Erica	5' 7" (1.7m)	143 lb (65kg)	1991-05-02	Rutgers	4

Head coach
(United States) Pokey Chatman (LSU)
Assistant coaches
(United States) Christie Sides (Louisiana Tech)
Athletic trainer
(United States) Todd Champlin (Daemen)
Strength and conditioning coach
(United States) Chase Campbell (Ball State)

Legend

- (C) Team captain
- (DP) Unsigned draft pick
- (FA) Free agent
- (S) Suspended
- Injured

== Schedule ==
=== Preseason ===
2019 pre-season game log
May: 3–0 (Home: 1–0; Road: 2–0)

Game	Date	Team	Score	High points	High rebounds	High assists	Location Attendance	Record
1	May 14	@ Chicago Sky	W 69–58	K. Mitchell (11)	McCowan (8)	K. Mitchell (4)	Wintrust Arena; 4,033	1–0
2	May 16	Chicago Sky	W 76–65	T. Mitchell (15)	Tied (7)	Wheeler (8)	Bankers Life Fieldhouse; 3,794	2–0
3	May 19	@ Dallas Wings	W 71–66	K. Mitchell (26)	McCowan (6)	Johnson (6)	College Park Center; 3,428	3–0

2019 pre-season schedule

=== Regular season ===
2019 game log
Total: 13–21 (Home: 7–10 Road: 6–11)
May: 1–1 (Home: 0–0; Road: 1–1)

Game	Date	Team	Score	High points	High rebounds	High assists	Location Attendance	Record
1	May 24	@ New York Liberty	W 81–80	T. Mitchell (22)	Dupree (7)	Wheeler (5)	Westchester County Center; 1,965	1–0
2	May 28	@ Connecticut Sun	L 77–88	Wheeler (26)	Dupree (8)	Wheeler (9)	Mohegan Sun Arena; 4,781	1–1

June : 4–8 (Home: 2–4; Road: 2–4)

Game	Date	Team	Score	High points	High rebounds	High assists	Location Attendance	Record
3	June 1	New York Liberty	W 92–77	K. Mitchell (23)	McCowan (6)	Wheeler (6)	Bankers Life Fieldhouse; 5,003	2–1
4	June 7	Dallas Wings	W 79–64	Achonwa (17)	Tied (11)	Wheeler (9)	Bankers Life Fieldhouse; 3,671	3–1
5	June 9	Phoenix Mercury	L 87–94	K. Mitchell (26)	Achonwa (7)	K. Mitchell (6)	Bankers Life Fieldhouse; 3,336	3–2
6	June 11	Seattle Storm	L 82–84	K. Mitchell (21)	Dupree (15)	K. Mitchell (7)	Bankers Life Fieldhouse; 3,506	3–3
7	June 13	@ Dallas Wings	W 76–72	Dupree (20)	Laney (11)	T. Mitchell (5)	College Park Center; 3,562	4–3
8	June 15	Chicago Sky	L 64–70	K. Mitchell (16)	T. Mitchell (8)	Wheeler (8)	Bankers Life Fieldhouse; 4,715	4–4
9	June 19	@ Atlanta Dream	L 78–88	Dupree (19)	McCowan (14)	Wheeler (5)	State Farm Arena; 6,474	4–5
10	June 21	@ Chicago Sky	W 76–69	Wheeler (28)	McCowan (13)	Wheeler (8)	Wintrust Arena; 4,945	5–5
11	June 23	@ Seattle Storm	L 61–65	Wheeler (18)	McCowan (13)	Wheeler (4)	Alaska Airlines Arena; 7,211	5–6
12	June 25	Minnesota Lynx	L 74–78	K. Mitchell (17)	3 tied (7)	Wheeler (4)	Bankers Life Fieldhouse; 4,692	5–7
13	June 28	@ Phoenix Mercury	L 69–91	Dupree (15)	McCowan (10)	Wheeler (3)	Talking Stick Resort Arena; 9,435	5–8
14	June 29	@ Las Vegas Aces	L 97–102 (OT)	K. Mitchell (21)	Achonwa (9)	Wheeler (8)	Mandalay Bay Events Center; 4,581	5–9

July : 2–6 (Home: 1–3; Road: 1–3)

Game	Date	Team	Score	High points	High rebounds	High assists	Location Attendance	Record
15	July 5	@ Dallas Wings	W 76–58	T. Mitchell (16)	McCowan (12)	Wheeler (7)	College Park Center; 5,093	6–9
16	July 10	Las Vegas Aces	L 71–74	Dupree (13)	McCowan (12)	Wheeler (7)	Bankers Life Fieldhouse; 9,247	6–10
17	July 12	Los Angeles Sparks	L 84–90	Tied (11)	3 tied (5)	K. Mitchell (5)	Bankers Life Fieldhouse; 7,849	6–11
18	July 14	Connecticut Sun	L 63–76	K. Mitchell (14)	McCowan (8)	Tied (4)	Bankers Life Fieldhouse; 6,434	6–12
19	July 19	Washington Mystics	L 88–95 (OT)	Wheeler (18)	Achonwa (12)	Wheeler (5)	Bankers Life Fieldhouse; 6,726	6–13
20	July 21	@ Chicago Sky	L 70–78	Wheeler (13)	McCowan (16)	Wheeler (9)	Wintrust Arena; 6,614	6–14
21	July 23	@ Phoenix Mercury	L 77–95	Wheeler (18)	McCowan (9)	Wheeler (9)	Talking Stick Resort Arena; 8,528	6–15
22	July 31	Atlanta Dream	W 61–59	Wheeler (15)	McCowan (14)	K. Mitchell (4)	Bankers Life Fieldhouse; 5,702	7–15

August : 4–5 (Home: 3–2; Road: 1–3)

Game	Date	Team	Score	High points	High rebounds	High assists	Location Attendance	Record
23	August 3	Minnesota Lynx	W 86–75	K. Mitchell (20)	McCowan (8)	K. Mitchell (9)	Bankers Life Fieldhouse; 7,884	8–15
24	August 8	@ Washington Mystics	L 78–91	K. Mitchell (18)	Mavunga (6)	K. Mitchell (6)	St. Elizabeth's East Arena; 3,013	8–16
25	August 10	Atlanta Dream	W 87–82	Wheeler (19)	Dupree (9)	Wheeler (7)	Bankers Life Fieldhouse; 7,923	9–16
26	August 18	@ Washington Mystics	L 68–107	T. Mitchell (17)	McCowan (10)	Achonwa (5)	St. Elizabeth's East Arena; 4,034	9–17
27	August 20	New York Liberty	L 76–82	McCowan (24)	McCowan (8)	Tied (5)	Bankers Life Fieldhouse; 5,340	9–18
28	August 22	@ Los Angeles Sparks	L 65–98	K. Mitchell (14)	McCowan (7)	Wheeler (6)	Staples Center; 8,816	9–19
29	August 25	@ Seattle Storm	W 63–54	McCowan (22)	McCowan (19)	Tied (3)	Alaska Airlines Arena; 8,076	10–19
30	August 27	Las Vegas Aces	W 86–71	McCowan (24)	McCowan (17)	4 tied (4)	Bankers Life Fieldhouse; 6,958	11–19
31	August 29	Los Angeles Sparks	L 83–87	McCowan (24)	McCowan (10)	K. Mitchell (5)	Bankers Life Fieldhouse; 5,641	11–20

September : 2–1 (Home: 1–0; Road: 1–1)

Game	Date	Team	Score	High points	High rebounds	High assists	Location Attendance	Record
32	September 1	@ Minnesota Lynx	L 73–81	Dupree (18)	McCowan (11)	T. Mitchell (6)	Target Center; 8,833	11–21
33	September 6	@ New York Liberty	W 86–81	K. Mitchell (22)	McCowan (13)	Wheeler (6)	Westchester County Center; 2,301	12–21
34	September 8	Connecticut Sun	W 104–76	K. Mitchell (38)	McCowan (9)	Laney (7)	Bankers Life Fieldhouse; 5,451	13–21

2019 season schedule

=== Standings ===
#	Eastern Conference	W	L	PCT	GB	Home	Road	Conf.
1	Washington Mystics (1)	26	8	.765	–	14–3	12–5	13–3
2	Connecticut Sun (2)	23	11	.676	3	15–2	8–9	11–5
3	Chicago Sky (5)	20	14	.588	6	12–5	8–9	11–5
4	e –Indiana Fever	13	21	.382	13	7–10	6–11	7–9
5	e –New York Liberty	10	24	.294	16	4–13	6–11	3–13
6	e –Atlanta Dream	8	26	.235	18	5–12	3–14	3–13

== Awards and honors ==
Recipient	Award	Date awarded	Ref.
Candice Dupree	WNBA All-Star Selection	July 15, 2019	
Erica Wheeler	WNBA All-Star Selection	July 15, 2019	
Teaira McCowan	WNBA All-Rookie Team	September 16, 2019	

== Statistics ==
Legend
GP	Games played	GS	Games started	MPG	Minutes per game	RPG	Rebounds per game
APG	Assists per game	SPG	Steals per game	BPG	Blocks per game	PPG	Points per game
FG%	Field-goal percentage	3P%	3-point field-goal percentage	FT%	Free-throw percentage	TO	Turnovers per game
PF	Fouls per game		Team leader		League leader

=== Regular season ===
Player	GP	GS	MPG	FG%	3P%	FT%	RPG	APG	SPG	BPG	PPG
Kelsey Mitchell	34	20	25.1	38.7	37.4	83.6	1.6	2.6	0.4	0.1	13.6
Candice Dupree	34	34	30.7	47.2	0	83.9	5.0	2.5	0.4	0.6	11.6
Erica Wheeler	34	34	25.0	42.8	38.4	87.2	3.0	5.0	1.2	0.1	10.1
Teaira McCowan	34	16	22.1	51.7	0	68.7	9.0	0.2	0.6	1.3	10.0
Tiffany Mitchell	33	14	25.2	38.1	29.0	89.2	2.8	2.2	0.6	0.1	9.7
Natalie Achonwa	30	18	21.1	48.8	25.0	90.9	5.2	1.6	0.6	0.7	8.7
Betnijah Laney	34	27	25.8	36.2	30.3	58.1	4.2	1.7	1.4	0.1	5.6
Shenise Johnson	17	0	12.9	33.3	24.2	93.8	2.1	1.1	0.7	0.1	12.9
Kennedy Burke	31	7	13.6	38.5	35.0	70.5	1.5	0.7	0.6	0.3	4.4
Paris Kea	11	0	5.5	40.7	55.6	50.0	0.5	0.5	0.1	0.2	2.6
Stephanie Mavunga	24	0	8.5	51.1	0	70.6	2.3	0.2	0.3	0.3	2.5
Erica McCall	15	0	6.9	13.6	0	100	1.8	0.4	0.1	0.4	0.9
