= 2019 Las Vegas Aces season =

- Head coach: Bill Laimbeer
- Arena: Mandalay Bay Events Center

Results
- Record: 21–13 (.618)
- Place: 2nd (Western)
- Playoff finish: 4th Seed, Lost in Conference Finals Washington, 1–3

Media
- Television: KVMY

The 2019 Las Vegas Aces season was the franchise's 23rd season in the Women's National Basketball Association and the second year the franchise is based in Las Vegas - after relocating from San Antonio and Utah. This was the second season under head coach Bill Laimbeer. The season tipped off on May 26, 2019, versus the Los Angeles Sparks.

The Aces started the season 7–5 and were never able to put together a winning streak of more than two games. However, the Aces improved in July and went 7–2 during that month. Their record included two separate three game winning streaks. One of their two losses actually occurred in August, due to an earthquake delayed game. The Aces cooled off in August, going 6–5. The record included a four-game winning streak, and a three-game losing streak. The Aces locked up a post season bid on August 18. The Aces went 1–1 in September to finish 21–13 on the year. This record secured them the fourth seed in the playoffs.

As the fourth seed, the Aces hosted the Chicago Sky in their second round match. The Aces won a close game 93–92 to advance to the semifinals. There they faced the top-seeded Washington Mystics. The Aces ended up losing to the Mystics, three games to one.

== Transactions ==
=== WNBA draft ===
Round	Pick	Player	Nationality	School/Team/Country
1	1	Jackie Young	United States	Notre Dame

=== Trades/Roster Changes ===
Date	Details
February 1, 2019	Re-signed F Dearica Hamby
February 19, 2019	Signed G Saniya Chong to a Training Camp Contract
February 19, 2019	Signed C Ruth Hamblin to a Training Camp Contract
February 21, 2019	Signed G/F Alex Harden to a Training Camp Contract
April 17, 2019	Signed G Dominique Wilson to a Training Camp Contract
May 12, 2019	Waived C Ruth Hamblin and G Dominique Wilson
May 13, 2019	Signed G Sydney Colson
May 16, 2019	Traded G Moriah Jefferson, C Isabelle Harrison, their first and second-round picks in the 2020 WNBA draft to the Dallas Wings for C Liz Cambage
August 28, 2019	Signed G Epiphanny Prince

== Roster ==
2019 Las Vegas Aces roster
Players
Coaches

Pos.	No.	Nat.	Name	Height	Weight	DOB	From	Yrs
C	8	(Australia)	Cambage, Liz	6' 8" (2.03m)	216 lb (98kg)	1991-08-18	Australia	3
G	51	(United States)	Colson, Sydney	5' 8" (1.73m)	140 lb (64kg)	1989-08-06	Texas A&M	5
F	5	(United States)	Hamby, Dearica	6' 3" (1.91m)	189 lb (86kg)	1993-11-06	Wake Forest	4
G	21	(United States)	McBride, Kayla	5' 10" (1.78m)	174 lb (79kg)	1992-06-25	Notre Dame	5
C	19	(South Korea)	Park Ji-su	6' 5" (1.96m)	206 lb (93kg)	1998-12-06	South Korea	1
G	10	(United States)	Plum, Kelsey	5' 8" (1.73m)	145 lb (66kg)	1994-08-24	Washington	2
G		(United States)	Prince, Epiphanny	5' 9" (1.75m)	179 lb (81kg)	1988-01-11	Rutgers	9
G	14	(United States)	Rodgers, Sugar	5' 9" (1.75m)	161 lb (73kg)	1989-12-08	Georgetown	6
C	4	(United States)	Swords, Carolyn	6' 6" (1.98m)	215 lb (98kg)	1989-07-18	Boston College	7
C	22	(United States)	Wilson, A'ja	6' 4" (1.93m)	195 lb (88kg)	1996-08-08	South Carolina	1
F	1	(United States)	Young, Tamera	6' 2" (1.88m)	175 lb (79kg)	1986-10-30	James Madison	10
G	0	(United States)	Young, Jackie	6' 0" (1.83m)	165 lb (75kg)	1997-09-16	Notre Dame	R

Head coach
(United States) Bill Laimbeer (Notre Dame)
Assistant coaches
(United States) Vickie Johnson (Louisiana Tech)
(United States) Kelly Schumacher (Connecticut)

Legend

- (C) Team captain
- (DP) Unsigned draft pick
- (FA) Free agent
- (S) Suspended
- Injured

== Game log ==
=== Pre-season ===
2019 pre-season game log
May: 0–1 (Home: 0–1; Road: 0–0)

Game	Date	Team	Score	High points	High rebounds	High assists	Location Attendance	Record
1	May 19	Minnesota Lynx	L 75–79	McBride (18)	Swords (8)	Plum (6)	Cox Pavilion	0–1

2019 pre-season schedule

=== Regular season ===
2019 game log
Total: 21–13 (Home: 13–4; Road: 8–9)
May: 1–1 (Home: 1–0; Road: 0–1)

Game	Date	Team	Score	High points	High rebounds	High assists	Location Attendance	Record
1	May 26	Los Angeles Sparks	W 83–70	Wilson (21)	Hamby (14)	Plum (6)	Mandalay Bay Events Center; 7,249	1–0
2	May 31	@ Phoenix Mercury	L 84–86	McBride (15)	Wilson (9)	Wilson (4)	Talking Stick Resort Arena; 14,090	1–1

June : 6–4 (Home: 4–2; Road: 2–2)

Game	Date	Team	Score	High points	High rebounds	High assists	Location Attendance	Record
3	June 2	Connecticut Sun	L 74–80	Wilson (19)	Wilson (9)	Colson (5)	Mandalay Bay Events Center; 2,747	1–2
4	June 6	@ Atlanta Dream	W 92–69	Tied (15)	Hamby (8)	J. Young (8)	State Farm Arena; 2,630	2–2
5	June 9	@ New York Liberty	L 78–88	McBride (25)	Cambage (10)	McBride (4)	Westchester County Center; 1,447	2–3
6	June 14	New York Liberty	W 100–65	Plum (19)	Wilson (8)	J. Young (8)	Mandalay Bay Events Center; 4,110	3–3
7	June 16	@ Minnesota Lynx	W 80–75	McBride (22)	Cambage (9)	Hamby (4)	Target Center; 8,392	4–3
8	June 20	Washington Mystics	L 72–95	Wilson (28)	Tied (6)	Tied (4)	Mandalay Bay Events Center; 4,416	4–4
9	June 22	Dallas Wings	W 86–68	Hamby (27)	Cambage (9)	J. Young (8)	Mandalay Bay Events Center; 4,347	5–4
10	June 25	Seattle Storm	W 60–56	Cambage (14)	Cambage (13)	Colson (4)	Mandalay Bay Events Center; 4,215	6–4
11	June 27	@ Los Angeles Sparks	L 74–86	Cambage (18)	Hamby (10)	J. Young (9)	Staples Center; 10,295	6–5
12	June 29	Indiana Fever	W 102–97 (OT)	Wilson (39)	Wilson (11)	J. Young (10)	Mandalay Bay Events Center; 4,581	7–5

July : 7–2 (Home: 4–1; Road: 3–1)

Game	Date	Team	Score	High points	High rebounds	High assists	Location Attendance	Record
13	July 2	Chicago Sky	W 90–82	3 tied (16)	Cambage (9)	J. Young (8)	Mandalay Bay Events Center; 3,516	8–5
14	July 5	Washington Mystics	L 70–99	Plum (17)	Tied (5)	Tied (5)	Mandalay Bay Events Center; N/A	8–6
15	July 7	@ New York Liberty	W 90–58	McBride (24)	Cambage (11)	Plum (6)	Westchester County Center; 1,971	9–6
16	July 10	@ Indiana Fever	W 74–71	Cambage (19)	3 Tied (6)	3 Tied (3)	Bankers Life Fieldhouse; 9,247	10–6
17	July 13	@ Washington Mystics	W 85–81	Tied (17)	Cambage (9)	3 Tied (4)	St. Elizabeth's East Arena; 4,200	11–6
18	July 19	@ Seattle Storm	L 66–69	Cambage (16)	Cambage (14)	Tied (3)	Alaska Airlines Arena; 9,000	11–7
19	July 21	Minnesota Lynx	W 79–74	Cambage (22)	Cambage (13)	Plum (8)	Mandalay Bay Events Center; 4,352	12–7
20	July 23	Seattle Storm	W 79–62	Hamby (24)	Cambage (12)	Cambage (6)	Mandalay Bay Events Center; 5,193	13–7
21	July 30	Dallas Wings	W 86–54	Tied (18)	Hamby (11)	J. Young (7)	Mandalay Bay Events Center; 3,756	14–7

August : 6–5 (Home: 4–1; Road: 2–4)

Game	Date	Team	Score	High points	High rebounds	High assists	Location Attendance	Record
22	August 1	@ Los Angeles Sparks	L 68–76	McBride (19)	Hamby (11)	T. Young (6)	Staples Center; 11,692	14–8
23	August 3	@ Dallas Wings	W 75–70	McBride (21)	Swords (10)	J. Young (5)	College Park Center; 5,882	15–8
24	August 9	Chicago Sky	L 84–87	Cambage (28)	Hamby (12)	McBride (5)	Mandalay Bay Events Center; 4,200	15–9
25	August 11	Connecticut Sun	W 89–81	Cambage (21)	Cambage (12)	Tied (6)	Mandalay Bay Events Center; 4,633	16–9
26	August 13	Atlanta Dream	W 94–90	Hamby (23)	Hamby (16)	Cambage (6)	Mandalay Bay Events Center; 3,532	17–9
27	August 18	@ Chicago Sky	W 100–85	Wilson (25)	Cambage (10)	T. Young (4)	Wintrust Arena; 6,072	18–9
28	August 20	Phoenix Mercury	W 84–79 (OT)	Tied (19)	Cambage (15)	J. Young (10)	Mandalay Bay Events Center; 5,032	19–9
29	August 23	@ Connecticut Sun	L 85–89	Cambage (18)	Hamby (10)	J. Young (5)	Mohegan Sun Arena; 7,483	19–10
30	August 25	@ Minnesota Lynx	L 77–98	J. Young (14)	Hamby (7)	J. Young (5)	Target Center; 8,834	19–11
31	August 27	@ Indiana Fever	L 71–86	Wilson (18)	Wilson (8)	Plum (6)	Bankers Life Fieldhouse; 6,958	19–12
32	August 31	Los Angeles Sparks	W 92–86	Wilson (24)	Tied (12)	Tied (5)	Mandalay Bay Events Center; 8,470	20–12

September : 1–1 (Home: 0–0; Road: 1–1)

Game	Date	Team	Score	High points	High rebounds	High assists	Location Attendance	Record
33	September 5	@ Atlanta Dream	L 74–78	Wilson (19)	Wilson (8)	J. Young (9)	State Farm Arena; 4,023	20–13
34	September 8	@ Phoenix Mercury	W 98–89	Cambage (21)	Cambage (9)	Tied (4)	Talking Stick Resort Arena; 13,135	21–13

2019 season schedule

=== Playoffs ===
2019 playoff game log
Total: 2–3 (Home: 2–1; Road: 0–2)
Second Round: 1–0 (Home: 1–0; Road: 0–0)

Game	Date	Team	Score	High points	High rebounds	High assists	Location Attendance	Series
1	September 15	Chicago Sky	W 93–92	Cambage (23)	Cambage (17)	Plum (6)	Thomas & Mack Center; 7,981	1–0

Semifinals: 1–3 (Home: 1–1; Road: 0–2)

Game	Date	Team	Score	High points	High rebounds	High assists	Location Attendance	Series
1	September 17	@ Washington Mystics	L 95–97	Wilson (23)	Cambage (12)	Plum (9)	St. Elizabeth's East Arena; 3,968	0–1
2	September 19	@ Washington Mystics	L 91–103	Cambage (23)	Cambage (10)	Plum (10)	St. Elizabeth's East Arena; 4,200	0–2
3	September 22	Washington Mystics	W 92–75	Cambage (28)	Wilson (8)	Plum (9)	Mandalay Bay Events Center; 6,175	1–2
4	September 24	Washington Mystics	L 90–94	Cambage (25)	Cambage (12)	Hamby (7)	Mandalay Bay Events Center; 5,465	1–3

2019 playoff schedule

== Standings ==
#	Western Conference	W	L	PCT	GB	Home	Road	Conf.
1	Los Angeles Sparks (3)	22	12	.647	–	15–2	7–10	10–6
2	Las Vegas Aces (4)	21	13	.618	1	13–4	8–9	11–5
3	Seattle Storm (6)	18	16	.529	4	11–6	7–10	10–6
4	Minnesota Lynx (7)	18	16	.529	4	11–6	7–10	7–9
5	Phoenix Mercury (8)	15	19	.441	7	9–8	6–11	5–11
6	e – Dallas Wings	10	24	.294	12	8–9	2–15	5–11

Notes

(#) – Conference Standing, Playoff Seeds shown to the right of team name
e – Eliminated from playoffs

== Playoffs ==
**First round** Single elimination (Sept. 11)
5	**Chicago Sky**	**105**
8	Phoenix Mercury	76
6	**Seattle Storm**	**84**
7	Minnesota Lynx	74

**Second round** Single elimination (Sept. 15)
4	**Las Vegas Aces**	**93**
5	Chicago Sky	92
3	**Los Angeles Sparks**	**92**
6	Seattle Storm	69

**Semifinals**; Best-of-5 (Sept. 17 – 24)
1	**Washington Mystics**	**3**
4	Las Vegas Aces	1
2	**Connecticut Sun**	**3**
3	Los Angeles Sparks	0

**WNBA Finals**; Best-of-5 (Sept. 29 – Oct. 10)
1	**Washington Mystics**	**3**
2	Connecticut Sun	2

Note: Teams re-seeded after each round.

- **Bold** – Game or series winner
- Italic – Team with home-court advantage

== Statistics ==
Legend
GP	Games played	GS	Games started	MPG	Minutes per game	RPG	Rebounds per game
APG	Assists per game	SPG	Steals per game	BPG	Blocks per game	PPG	Points per game
FG%	Field-goal percentage	3P%	3-point field-goal percentage	FT%	Free-throw percentage	TO	Turnovers per game
PF	Fouls per game		Team leader		League leader

=== Regular season ===
Player	GP	GS	MPG	FG%	3P%	FT%	RPG	APG	SPG	BPG	PPG
A'ja Wilson	26	25	28.4	47.9	0	79.2	6.4	1.8	0.5	1.7	16.5
Liz Cambage	32	30	25.2	50.4	16.7	74.8	8.2	2.1	0.6	1.6	15.9
Kayla McBride	34	34	29.1	42.5	42.8	90.6	4.2	2.6	1.2	0.1	13.3
Dearica Hamby	34	9	24.8	48.8	32.1	71.8	7.6	1.9	1.0	0.4	11.0
Kelsey Plum	34	30	25.5	36.5	35.7	87.2	2.8	3.0	0.8	0.1	8.6
Jackie Young	34	34	22.6	32.2	31.8	80.8	3.3	4.5	0.8	0.4	6.6
Tamera Young	34	4	18.5	38.0	31.3	63.9	3.6	2.0	0.7	0.1	5.3
Epiphanny Prince	3	0	9.3	50.0	42.9	0	0.7	1.0	0.3	0.3	4.3
Sugar Rodgers	33	0	11.6	36.0	35.7	60.0	1.5	1.2	0.4	0.4	3.4
Sydney Colson	33	0	11.5	44.0	45.0	81.8	0.7	1.8	0.9	0.1	3.3
Carolyn Swords	29	4	8.9	43.8	0	84.6	2.2	0.3	0.2	0.1	2.6
Park Ji-su	25	0	6.5	21.6	0	44.4	1.1	0.4	0.2	0.2	0.8

== Awards and honors ==
Recipient	Award	Date awarded	Ref.
A'ja Wilson	WNBA Western Conference Player of the Week	June 24, 2019	
A'ja Wilson	WNBA Western Conference Player of the Week	July 1, 2019	
Kayla McBride	WNBA All-Star Selection	July 15, 2019	
A'ja Wilson	WNBA All-Star Selection	July 15, 2019	
Liz Cambage	WNBA All-Star Selection	July 15, 2019	
Bill Laimbeer	WNBA Coach of the Month - July	August 1, 2019	
Dearica Hamby	Sixth Woman of the Year	September 15, 2019	
Jackie Young	WNBA All-Rookie Team	September 16, 2019	
