= 2019 New York Liberty season =

- Head coach: Katie Smith
- Arena: Westchester County Center

Results
- Record: 10–24 (.294)
- Place: 5th (Eastern)
- Playoff finish: Did not qualify

Media
- Television: YES

The 2019 WNBA season was the 23rd season for the New York Liberty franchise of the WNBA. The Liberty opened the regular season at home on May 24 versus the Indiana Fever.

The Liberty started slowly, losing their first four games of the season. Winning five of their next eight games took them to a 5–7 record at the end of June. The team had plenty of reasons to be positive, as three of those five wins came against eventual playoff teams. The Liberty won their first two games in July to put together a four game win streak and reach a .500 record. However, they could not keep their momentum, losing three of their last four games in July. August proved a difficult month as the team only won one game. A seven game losing streak and a six game losing streak saw the team go into the final game with the Atlanta Dream with a 9–24 record. The Dream entered with 8–25 record, meaning if the Dream won, the teams would tie for the worst record in the WNBA. The Liberty won by seven points to end their season on a high note. Their ten wins is the second lowest in franchise history, with the only worse season being 2018 where they had only seven wins.

After the season, it was announced that head coach Katie Smith's contract would not be renewed.

== Transactions ==
=== WNBA draft ===
Round	Pick	Player	Nationality	School/Team/Country
1	2	Asia Durr	United States	Louisville
2	14	Han Xu	China	Xinjiang Magic Deer (China)
3	26	Megan Huff	United States	Utah

=== Trades/Roster Changes ===
Date	Details
February 11, 2019	Re-signed G Rebecca Allen
February 11, 2019	Re-signed C Amanda Zahui B
February 11, 2019	Signed F Nayo Raincock-Ekunwe
February 11, 2019	Signed G Kelly Faris to a Training Camp Contract.
March 21, 2019	Signed G Marine Johannès
March 28, 2019	Signed G Brittany Boyd
April 11, 2019	Traded a second round pick in the 2020 WNBA draft to Minnesota for G Tanisha Wright.

== Roster ==
2019 New York Liberty roster
Players
Coaches

Pos.	No.	Nat.	Name	Height	Weight	DOB	From	Yrs
G	9	(Australia)	Allen, Rebecca	6' 2" (1.88m)	162 lb (73kg)	1992-11-06	Australia	4
G	15	(United States)	Boyd, Brittany	5' 9" (1.75m)	156 lb (71kg)	1993-06-11	California	4
C	31	(United States)	Charles, Tina	6' 4" (1.93m)	192 lb (87kg)	1988-12-05	Connecticut	9
G	25	(United States)	Durr, Asia	5' 10" (1.78m)	151 lb (68kg)	1997-04-05	Louisville	R
F	12	(United States)	Gray, Reshanda	6' 2" (1.88m)	192 lb (87kg)	1992-06-01	California	2
G	14	(France)	Hartley, Bria	5' 8" (1.73m)	148 lb (67kg)	1992-09-30	Connecticut	5
G	23	(France)	Johannès, Marine	5' 10" (1.78m)	134 lb (61kg)	1995-01-25	France	R
G	5	(Canada)	Nurse, Kia	6' 0" (1.83m)	168 lb (76kg)	1996-02-22	Connecticut	1
F/C	4	(Canada)	Raincock-Ekunwe, Nayo	6' 2" (1.88m)	175 lb (79kg)	1991-08-29	Canada	1
G	30	(United States)	Wright, Tanisha	5' 11" (1.8m)	166 lb (75kg)	1983-11-29	Penn State	13
C	21	(China)	Xu, Han	6' 9" (2.06m)	193 lb (88kg)	1999-10-31	China	R
C	17	(Sweden)	Zahui B., Amanda	6' 5" (1.96m)	250 lb (113kg)	1993-09-08	Minnesota	4

Head coach
(United States) Katie Smith (Ohio State)
Assistant coaches
(United States) Herb Williams (Ohio State)
Athletic trainer
(United States) Theresa Acosta

Legend

- (C) Team captain
- (DP) Unsigned draft pick
- (FA) Free agent
- (S) Suspended
- Injured

== Game log ==
=== Pre-season ===
2019 pre-season game log
May: 1–3 (Home: 1–1; Road: 0–2)

Game	Date	Team	Score	High points	High rebounds	High assists	Location Attendance	Record
1	May 9	China	W 89–71	Tied (19)	Warley-Talbert (8)	Boyd (4)	Barclays Center; 4,115	1–0
2	May 13	@ Connecticut Sun	L 66–100	Charles (11)	Charles (5)	Wright (4)	Mohegan Sun Arena; 3,806	1–1
3	May 14	vs. Atlanta Dream	L 87–92	Zahui B. (20)	Zahui B. (8)	Tied (4)	Mohegan Sun Arena; 3,458	1–2
4	May 19	vs. Connecticut Sun	L 79–98	Nurse (25)	Charles (6)	5 tied (2)	Times Union Center	1–3

2019 pre-season schedule

=== Regular season ===
2019 game log
Total: 10–24 (Home: 4–13; Road: 6–11)
May: 0–1 (Home: 0–1; Road: 0–0)

Game	Date	Team	Score	High points	High rebounds	High assists	Location Attendance	Record
1	May 24	Indiana Fever	L 80–81	Charles (32)	Charles (12)	Hartley (4)	Westchester County Center; 1,965	0–1

June : 5–6 (Home: 3–3; Road: 2–3)

Game	Date	Team	Score	High points	High rebounds	High assists	Location Attendance	Record
2	June 1	@ Indiana Fever	L 77–92	Charles (15)	Gray (9)	Boyd (6)	Bankers Life Fieldhouse; 5,003	0–2
3	June 4	Los Angeles Sparks	L 73–78	Charles (21)	Charles (14)	Boyd (6)	Westchester County Center; 3,579	0–3
4	June 7	Washington Mystics	L 85–94	Charles (27)	Zahui B. (7)	Tied (5)	Westchester County Center; 1,567	0–4
5	June 9	Las Vegas Aces	W 88–78	Charles (21)	Zahui B. (9)	Hartley (6)	Westchester County Center; 1,447	1–4
6	June 12	Minnesota Lynx	W 75–69	Nurse (26)	Zahui B. (13)	Boyd (7)	Westchester County Center; 1,181	2–4
7	June 14	@ Las Vegas Aces	L 65–100	Nurse (12)	Gray (5)	Boyd (5)	Mandalay Bay Events Center; 4,110	2–5
8	June 15	@ Los Angeles Sparks	W 98–92	Zahui B. (37)	Charles (13)	Boyd (12)	Staples Center; 11,388	3–5
9	June 19	Chicago Sky	L 83–91	Durr (19)	Zahui B. (10)	Boyd (7)	Westchester County Center; 1,585	3–6
10	June 22	@ Minnesota Lynx	L 83–92	Nurse (24)	Charles (9)	Boyd (8)	Target Center; 8,600	3–7
11	June 28	Dallas Wings	W 69–68	Nurse (17)	Gray (11)	Boyd (7)	Westchester County Center; 2,191	4–7
12	June 30	@ Atlanta Dream	W 74–58	Charles (24)	Gray (15)	3 tied (4)	State Farm Arena; 4,359	5–7

July : 3–4 (Home: 1–1; Road: 2–3)

Game	Date	Team	Score	High points	High rebounds	High assists	Location Attendance	Record
13	July 3	@ Seattle Storm	W 84–83	Charles (26)	Gray (8)	Boyd (10)	Alaska Airlines Arena; 8,710	6–7
14	July 5	@ Phoenix Mercury	W 80–76	Nurse (26)	Charles (12)	Boyd (6)	Talking Stick Resort Arena; 9,560	7–7
15	July 7	Las Vegas Aces	L 58–90	Charles (13)	Charles (8)	Wright (5)	Westchester County Center; 1,971	7–8
16	July 12	@ Chicago Sky	L 83–99	Nurse (18)	Gray (6)	Tied (5)	Wintrust Arena; 7,221	7–9
17	July 14	@ Seattle Storm	L 69–78	Nurse (19)	Zahui B. (8)	Hartley (5)	Alaska Airlines Arena; 6,733	7–10
18	July 20	Los Angeles Sparks	W 83–78	Johannès (17)	Gray (8)	Boyd (6)	Westchester County Center; 2,195	8–10
19	July 24	@ Connecticut Sun	L 63–70	Charles (13)	Charles (11)	Wright (5)	Mohegan Sun Arena; 8,249	8–11

August : 1–11 (Home: 0–6; Road: 1–5)

Game	Date	Team	Score	High points	High rebounds	High assists	Location Attendance	Record
20	August 1	@ Dallas Wings	L 64–87	Nurse (13)	Charles (5)	Wright (4)	College Park Center; 4,011	8–12
21	August 4	Connecticut Sun	L 79–94	Charles (20)	Charles (10)	Zahui B. (5)	Westchester County Center; 1,927	8–13
22	August 7	@ Chicago Sky	L 92–101	Charles (24)	Zahui B. (9)	Tied (7)	Wintrust Arena; 5,797	8–14
23	August 11	Seattle Storm	L 69–84	Charles (22)	Charles (8)	Wright (7)	Barclays Center; 7,715	8–15
24	August 13	Minnesota Lynx	L 73–89	Allen (28)	Charles (7)	Boyd (7)	Westchester County Center; 1,570	8–16
25	August 16	@ Dallas Wings	L 77–83	Charles (25)	Wright (9)	Wright (7)	College Park Center; 4,070	8–17
26	August 18	@ Phoenix Mercury	L 72–78	Charles (23)	Charles (13)	Tied (5)	Talking Stick Resort Arena; 9,145	8–18
27	August 20	@ Indiana Fever	W 82–76	Charles (23)	Charles (14)	Tied (4)	Bankers Life Fieldhouse; 5,340	9–18
28	August 23	Atlanta Dream	L 87–90	Hartley (17)	Charles (8)	Wright (6)	Westchester County Center; 1,831	9–19
29	August 25	@ Washington Mystics	L 72–101	Nurse (24)	Tied (5)	Wright (4)	St. Elizabeth's East Arena; 4,200	9–20
30	August 27	Phoenix Mercury	L 82–95	Tied (18)	Tied (5)	Nurse (6)	Westchester County Center; 1,693	9–21
31	August 30	Connecticut Sun	L 84–94	Johannès (21)	Raincock-Ekunwe (7)	Tied (6)	Westchester County Center; 1,791	9–22

September : 1–2 (Home: 0–2; Road: 1–0)

Game	Date	Team	Score	High points	High rebounds	High assists	Location Attendance	Record
32	September 3	Washington Mystics	L 77–93	Johannès (22)	Raincock-Ekunwe (5)	Charles (5)	Westchester County Center; 1,558	9–23
33	September 6	Indiana Fever	L 81–86	Charles (19)	Charles (11)	Tied (7)	Westchester County Center; 2,301	9–24
34	September 8	@ Atlanta Dream	W 71–63	Charles (14)	Zahui B. (11)	Charles (5)	State Farm Arena; 5,495	10–24

2019 season schedule

== Standings ==
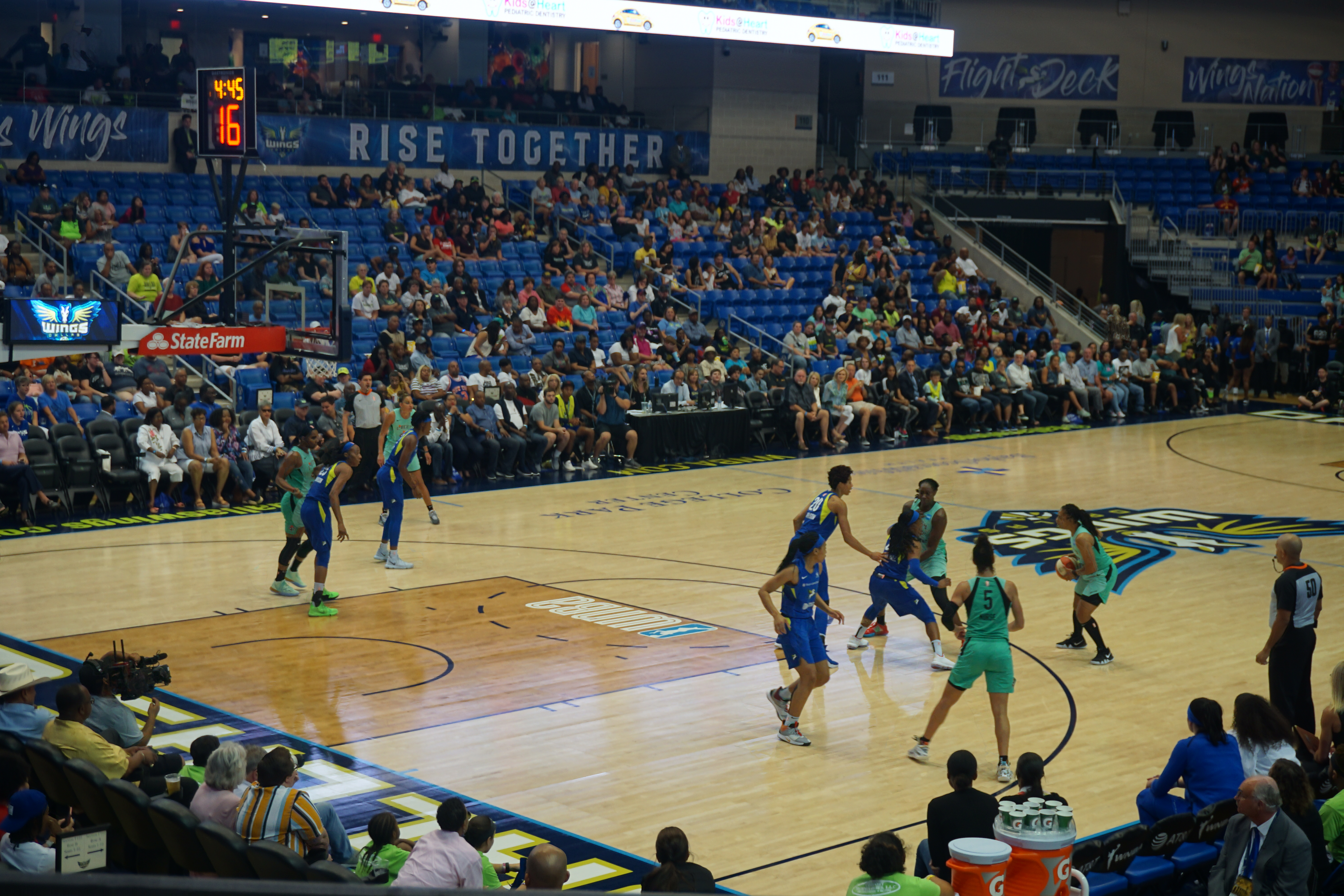
The Liberty in action at Dallas

#	Eastern Conference	W	L	PCT	GB	Home	Road	Conf.
1	Washington Mystics (1)	26	8	.765	–	14–3	12–5	13–3
2	Connecticut Sun (2)	23	11	.676	3	15–2	8–9	11–5
3	Chicago Sky (5)	20	14	.588	6	12–5	8–9	11–5
4	e –Indiana Fever	13	21	.382	13	7–10	6–11	7–9
5	e –New York Liberty	10	24	.294	16	4–13	6–11	3–13
6	e –Atlanta Dream	8	26	.235	18	5–12	3–14	3–13

== Statistics ==
Legend
GP	Games played	GS	Games started	MPG	Minutes per game	RPG	Rebounds per game
APG	Assists per game	SPG	Steals per game	BPG	Blocks per game	PPG	Points per game
FG%	Field-goal percentage	3P%	3-point field-goal percentage	FT%	Free-throw percentage	TO	Turnovers per game
PF	Fouls per game		Team leader		League leader

=== Regular season ===
Player	GP	GS	MPG	FG%	3P%	FT%	RPG	APG	SPG	BPG	PPG
Tina Charles	33	33	31.2	38.9	18.6	81.2	7.5	2.4	0.7	0.9	16.9
Kia Nurse	34	34	29.4	39.3	35.3	87.2	2.5	2.3	0.7	0.1	13.7
Bria Hartley	24	18	22.7	37.6	32.9	80.3	3.2	3.2	0.8	0	9.8
Asia Durr	18	15	26.7	46.7	29.4	81.8	1.6	1.7	0.6	0.4	9.7
Amanda Zahui B.	24	23	23.3	46.8	31.9	85.2	6.3	0.9	1.1	1.4	8.6
Rebecca Allen	24	2	17.2	41.7	42.6	81.3	2.5	0.7	0.5	0.8	7.2
Marine Johannès	19	0	18.2	43.6	37.9	78.9	1.8	2.4	0.4	0.2	7.2
Brittany Boyd	33	17	19.7	39.4	30.4	76.5	3.7	4.6	1.4	0.1	5.3
Reshanda Gray	34	10	15.3	47.3	50.0	56.5	5.2	0.5	0.5	0.2	5.2
Tanisha Wright	31	17	19.8	41.5	36.8	80.6	2.8	4.1	1.0	0.3	4.7
Nayo Raincock-Ekunwe	28	1	13.1	54.4	33.3	64.0	2.8	0.4	0.3	0.1	3.7
Han Xu	18	0	7.9	41.4	50.0	50.0	0.8	0.1	0.2	0.2	3.0

== Awards and honors ==
Recipient	Award	Date awarded	Ref.
Tina Charles	WNBA Eastern Conference Player of the Week	July 8, 2019	
Kia Nurse	WNBA All-Star Selection	July 15, 2019	
Tina Charles	WNBA All-Star Selection	July 15, 2019	
