= Brittany Boyd =

American basketball player (born 1993)

Brittany Boyd-Jones
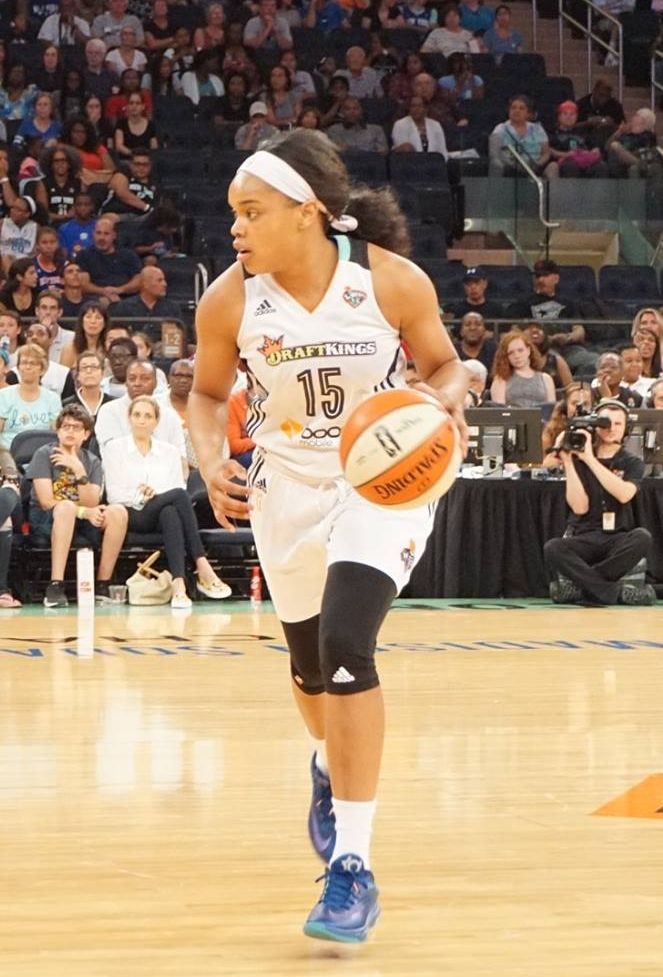
- Boyd in 2015

Personal information
- Born: June 11, 1993 (age 33)
- Listed height: 5 ft 9 in (1.75 m)
- Listed weight: 156 lb (71 kg)

Career information
- High school: Berkeley (Berkeley, California)
- College: California (2011–2015)
- WNBA draft: 2015: 1st round, 9th overall pick
- Drafted by: New York Liberty
- Playing career: 2015–2021
- Position: Point guard
- Number: 15
- Coaching career: 2022–present

Career history

Playing
- 2015–2019: New York Liberty
- 2019–2020: Elitzur Ramla
- 2021: Chicago Sky

Coaching
- 2022-2024: Cal State East Bay (asst.)
- 2024-present: Saint Mary's (asst.)

Career highlights
- WNBA All-Rookie Team (2015); Second-team All-American – AP (2015); WBCA Coaches' All-American (2015); 2x Pac-12 All-Defensive Team (2014, 2015); 3× All-Pac-12 (2013–2015); Pac-12 All-Freshman team (2012)
- Stats at WNBA.com
- Stats at Basketball Reference

Brittany Boyd-Jones (née Boyd; born June 11, 1993) is an American former professional basketball player in the Women's National Basketball Association (WNBA). She previously played for the Chicago Sky. She played college basketball for the California Golden Bears. She was selected by New York in the first round of the 2015 WNBA draft with the ninth overall pick.

Boyd grew up in Richmond, California, and attended high school in Berkeley at Berkeley High. As a senior in college, she helped Cal advance to the second round of the 2015 NCAA Tournament. Boyd averaged 13.4 points, 7.7 rebounds, 6.8 assists and 2.9 steals per game for the season, and was a semifinalist for the Naismith College Player of the Year. She was the first player in the history of the Pac-12 Conference to reach career totals of 1,400 points, 700 rebounds, 600 assists and 300 steals.

Boyd played five seasons with New York. In 2019, she tied a career high with 33 games played while starting in a career-high 17 contests. The Liberty waived her after the season.

She was picked up by the Sky in 2021, but waved by the team in May 2021.

== Coaching career ==
Boyd was assistant coach for the Cal State East Bay women's basketball team from 2022-2024.
In September 2024, it was announced that Boyd would become an assistant coach for the St. Mary's Gaels women's basketball team.

== Career statistics ==
=== WNBA career statistics ===
Legend
GP	Games played	GS	Games started	MPG	Minutes per game	RPG	Rebounds per game
APG	Assists per game	SPG	Steals per game	BPG	Blocks per game	PPG	Points per game
TO	Turnovers per game	FG%	Field-goal percentage	3P%	3-point field-goal percentage	FT%	Free-throw percentage
**Bold**	Career best	°	League leader

==== Regular season ====
WNBA regular season statistics
Year	Team	GP	GS	MPG	FG%	3P%	FT%	RPG	APG	SPG	BPG	TO	PPG
2015	New York	30	4	14.3	39.1	26.7	71.3	2.7	2.3	1.2	0.1	1.6	6.6
2016	New York	**33**	9	19.7	36.1	16.7	72.8	2.5	3.6	**1.6**	0.1	2.0	6.5
2017	New York	2	2	16.0	**60.0**	0.0	72.7	**4.0**	2.5	1.5	0.0	**1.0**	**13.0**
2018	New York	30	14	**20.4**	41.4	37.0	**77.4**	3.9	**5.3**	1.2	0.1	2.7	6.4
2019	New York	**33**	**17**	19.7	39.4	30.4	76.5	3.7	4.6	1.4	0.1	2.5	5.3
2020	Did not play (waived)												
2021	Chicago	2	0	11.0	25.0	**50.0**	50.0	1.0	2.0	1.0	0.0	2.0	2.0
**Career**	6 years, 2 teams	130	46	18.4	39.2	26.9	73.4	3.2	3.9	1.4	0.1	2.2	6.2

==== Playoffs ====
WNBA playoff statistics
Year	Team	GP	GS	MPG	FG%	3P%	FT%	RPG	APG	SPG	BPG	TO	PPG
2016	New York	1	0	12.0	25.0	0.0	0.0	2.0	2.0	1.0	0.0	2.0	2.0
**Career**	1 year, 2 team	1	0	12.0	25.0	0.0	0.0	2.0	2.0	1.0	0.0	2.0	2.0

=== College ===
NCAA statistics
Year	Team	GP	Points	FG%	3P%	FT%	RPG	APG	SPG	BPG	PPG
2011-12	California	**35**	358	37.5%	16.4%	58.6%	3.9	4.8	2.5	0.2	10.2
2012-13	California	**35**	438	37.3%	28.7%	60.6%	5.4	4.4	2.6	**0.3**	12.5
2013-14	California	31	**457**	37.8%	24.3%	**64.6%**	6.6	6.0	2.9	0.2	**14.7**
2014-15	California	33	442	**41.1%**	**34.3%**	62.7%	**7.7**	**6.8**	2.9	0.1	13.4
**Career**		134	1695	38.4%	26.7%	61.9%	5.9	5.5	2.7	0.2	12.6
