= 2019 Atlanta Dream season =

- Head coach: Nicki Collen
- Arena: State Farm Arena

Results
- Record: 8–26 (.235)
- Place: 6th (Eastern)
- Playoff finish: Did not qualify

Media
- Television: WSB-TV

The 2019 WNBA season was the 12th season for the Atlanta Dream of the Women's National Basketball Association. The team began its season on May 24, 2019, against the Dallas Wings and concluded the season on September 8 against the New York Liberty.

On December 13, 2018, the Atlanta Dream announced that they would return to State Farm Arena, formerly Philips Arena, after playing the previous two seasons at Georgia Tech's McCamish Pavilion while State Farm Arena underwent a $192.5 million renovation.

The Dream endured a season without star Angel McCoughtry, who missed time with a knee ligament injury sustained in 2018. The Dream started slowly only winning 2 games of their first ten. Early July brought some hope to the team, with the Dream winning three of four games between July 5 and July 12. However, the streak would not continue as the Dream lost twelve games in a row from July 14 to August 20. The Dream won three of their last 7 games to finish with an 8–26 record, last in the WNBA. It was the Dream's second worst season in franchise history. For the first time in franchise history, the Dream did not have a player selected to the All-Star Game.

== Transactions ==
=== WNBA draft ===
Round	Pick	Player	Nationality	School/team/country
1	11	Brianna Turner	United States	Notre Dame
2	23	Maite Cazorla	Spain	Oregon
3	35	Li Yueru	China	Guangdong Vermilion Birds (China)

=== Trades and Roster Changes ===
Date	Transaction
January 1, 2019	Exercised 4th-Year Team Option on Brittney Sykes
January 1, 2019	Extended a Qualifying Offer to Damiris Dantas
January 2, 2019	Extended a Qualifying Offer to Blake Dietrick
February 2, 2019	Signed Blake Dietrick to a training-camp contract
February 6, 2019	Signed Haley Peters to a training-camp contract
February 11, 2019	Signed Lynetta Kizer to a training-camp contract
March 15, 2019	Signed Mengran Sun to a training-camp contract
April 10, 2019	Traded F Brianna Turner to the Phoenix Mercury for Marie Gülich
April 11, 2019	Traded a 2nd-round pick in the 2020 WNBA draft to the New York Liberty in exchange for Nia Coffey from the Las Vegas Aces - as part of a 3-Team Trade
April 14, 2019	Signed Maite Cazorla to a rookie-scale contract
April 17, 2019	Signed Meme Jackson to training-camp contract
May 16, 2019	Waived Meme Jackson
May 16, 2019	Traded Imani McGee-Stafford to Dallas Wings for a 3rd-round pick in the 2020 WNBA draft
May 21, 2019	Waived Lynetta Kizer
May 23, 2019	Waived Blake Dietrick
May 23, 2019	Full Season Suspension of Mengran Sun
June 16, 2019	Temporarily Suspend Alex Bentley due to Overseas Commitments
June 19, 2019	Signed Natisha Hiedeman
July 1, 2019	Activated Alex Bentley from her Temporary Suspension
July 1, 2019	Waived Natisha Hiedeman
July 17, 2019	Waived Haley Peters
July 18, 2019	Signed Alaina Coates

== Roster ==
2019 Atlanta Dream roster
Players
Coaches

Pos.	No.	Nat.	Name	Height	Weight	DOB	From	Yrs
G	20	(United States)	Bentley, Alex	5' 7" (1.7m)	152 lb (69kg)	1990-10-27	Penn State	6
F	25	(United States)	Billings, Monique	6' 4" (1.93m)	185 lb (84kg)	1996-05-02	UCLA	1
F	51	(United States)	Breland, Jessica	6' 2" (1.88m)	166 lb (75kg)	1988-02-23	North Carolina	7
G	5	(Spain)	Cazorla, Maite	5' 10" (1.78m)	155 lb (70kg)	1997-06-18	Oregon	R
C	81	(United States)	Coates, Alaina	6' 4" (1.93m)	225 lb (102kg)	1995-04-07	South Carolina	1
F	10	(United States)	Coffey, Nia	5' 10" (1.78m)	182 lb (83kg)	1993-06-11	Northwestern	2
C	24	(Germany)	Gülich, Marie	6' 5" (1.96m)	205 lb (93kg)	1994-05-28	Oregon State	1
G	15	(United States)	Hayes, Tiffany	5' 10" (1.78m)	155 lb (70kg)	1989-09-20	Connecticut	7
G/F	35	(United States)	McCoughtry, Angel (injured)	6' 1" (1.85m)	173 lb (78kg)	1986-07-10	Louisville	9
G	21	(United States)	Montgomery, Renee	5' 7" (1.7m)	140 lb (64kg)	1986-12-02	Connecticut	10
G	7	(United States)	Sykes, Brittney	5' 9" (1.75m)	154 lb (70kg)	1994-02-07	Syracuse	2
F/C	1	(United States)	Williams, Elizabeth	6' 3" (1.91m)	200 lb (91kg)	1993-06-23	Duke	4

Head coach
(United States) Nicki Collen (Marquette)
Assistant coaches
(United States) Mike Peterson (Bushnell)
(United States) Darius Taylor (Michigan)
Athletic trainer
(United States) Jessica Cohen (Vanderbilt)
Strength and conditioning coach
(United States) Ashley Alexander (New Orleans)

Legend

- (C) Team captain
- (DP) Unsigned draft pick
- (FA) Free agent
- (S) Suspended
- Injured

=== Depth ===
Pos.	Starter	Bench
C	Elizabeth Williams	Marie Gülich; Alaina Coates
PF	Jessica Breland	Monique Billings
SF	Brittney Sykes	Nia Coffey; Angel McCoughtry
SG	Tiffany Hayes	Alex Bentley
PG	Renee Montgomery	Maite Cazorla

== Schedule ==
=== Preseason ===
2019 Preseason Schedule
Total: 2–1 (Home: 0–1; Road: 2–0)

Game	Date	Opponent	Score	High points	High rebounds	High assists	Location/Attendance	Record
1	May 13	vs. Dallas	W 82–59	Bentley (15)	Gülich (6)	Tied (5)	Mohegan Sun Arena; 3,300	1–0
2	May 14	vs. New York	W 87–92	Coffey (18)	McGee-Stafford (6)	Tied (4)	Mohegan Sun Arena; 3,458	2–0
3	May 17	Washington	L 64–75	Hayes (17)	Billings (6)	Montgomery (4)	Albany Civic Center; N/A	2–1

2019 pre-season schedule

=== Regular season ===
2016 Regular Season
Total: 8–26 (Home: 5–12; Road: 3–14)
May: 1–1 (Home: 1–1; Road: 0–0)

Game	Date	Opponent	Score	High points	High rebounds	High assists	Location/Attendance	Record
1	May 24	Dallas	W 76–72	Breland (17)	Tied (6)	Sykes (4)	State Farm Arena; 3,070	1–0
2	May 31	Seattle	L 66–82	Sykes (12)	3 tied (8)	Bentley (4)	State Farm Arena; 2,119	1–1

June: 1–7 (Home: 1–4; Road: 0–3)

Game	Date	Opponent	Score	High points	High rebounds	High assists	Location/Attendance	Record
3	June 1	@ Washington	L 75–96	Tied (11)	Breland (7)	Bentley (4)	St. Elizabeth's East Arena; 4,200	1–2
4	June 6	Las Vegas	L 69–92	Sykes (15)	Breland (9)	Montgomery (5)	State Farm Arena; 2,630	1–3
5	June 9	Connecticut	L 59–65	Tied (14)	Billings (10)	Tied (3)	State Farm Arena; 3,082	1–4
6	June 15	@ Dallas	L 61–71	Williams (16)	Williams (8)	Hayes (3)	College Park Center; 5,220	1–5
7	June 19	Indiana	W 88–78	Hayes (28)	Billings (8)	Montgomery (9)	State Farm Arena; 6,474	2–5
8	June 21	@ Connecticut	L 76–86	Sykes (18)	Breland (8)	Hayes (6)	Mohegan Sun Arena; 6,608	2–6
9	June 23	Washington	L 73–89	Hayes (18)	Billings (14)	Cazorla (6)	State Farm Arena; 4,136	2–7
10	June 30	New York	L 58–74	Sykes (18)	Williams (8)	Tied (4)	State Farm Arena; 4,359	2–8

July: 3–8 (Home: 2–2; Road: 1–6)

Game	Date	Opponent	Score	High points	High rebounds	High assists	Location/Attendance	Record
11	July 2	@ Minnesota	L 68–85	Williams (14)	Breland (5)	Bentley (5)	Target Center; 8,208	2–9
12	July 5	@ Seattle	W 77–66	Hayes (21)	Williams (9)	Tied (5)	Alaska Airlines Arena; 8,111	3–9
13	July 7	@ Phoenix	L 63–65	Sykes (29)	Sykes (10)	3 tied (3)	Talking Stick Resort Arena; 9,850	3–10
14	July 10	Connecticut	W 78–75	Hayes (18)	Breland (13)	Tied (4)	State Farm Arena; 3,866	4–10
15	July 12	Minnesota	W 60–53	Williams (17)	Breland (9)	Hayes (4)	State Farm Arena; 4,001	5–10
16	July 14	Los Angeles	L 71–76 (OT)	Hayes (24)	Billings (16)	Hayes (4)	State Farm Arena; 5,083	5–11
17	July 17	@ Chicago	L 76–77	Montgomery (23)	Breland (11)	Tied (6)	Wintrust Arena; 10,143	5–12
18	July 19	@ Connecticut	L 69–98	Sykes (26)	Coffey (7)	Sykes (4)	Mohegan Sun Arena; 6,733	5–13
19	July 21	@ Washington	L 65–93	Williams (14)	Gülich (8)	Cazorla (4)	St. Elizabeth's East Arena; 4,200	5–14
20	July 23	Los Angeles	L 66–78	Billings (16)	Tied (8)	Bentley (5)	State Farm Arena; 7,047	5–15
21	July 31	@ Indiana	L 59–61	Williams (17)	Billings (12)	Breland (4)	Bankers Life Fieldhouse; 5,702	5–16

August: 2–7 (Home: 0–4; Road: 2–3)

Game	Date	Opponent	Score	High points	High rebounds	High assists	Location/Attendance	Record
22	August 3	Chicago	L 75–87	Bentley (21)	Breland (7)	Hayes (4)	State Farm Arena; 5,427	5–17
23	August 6	Minnesota	L 69–85	Montgomery (19)	Sykes (8)	Tied (3)	State Farm Arena; 3,395	5–18
24	August 10	@ Indiana	L 82–87	Hayes (34)	Sykes (9)	Sykes (5)	Bankers Life Fieldhouse; 7,923	5–19
25	August 13	@ Las Vegas	L 90–94	Breland (18)	Gülich (12)	Bentley (7)	Mandalay Bay Events Center; 3,532	5–20
26	August 16	@ Phoenix	L 68–77	Montgomery (17)	Williams (11)	Williams (4)	Talking Stick Resort Arena; 8,480	5–21
27	August 20	Chicago	L 83–87	Hayes (27)	Billings (9)	Bentley (5)	State Farm Arena; 4,662	5–22
28	August 23	@ New York	W 90–87	Hayes (19)	Breland (12)	Sykes (6)	Westchester County Center; 1,831	6–22
29	August 25	@ Dallas	W 77–73	Hayes (23)	Breland (12)	Bentley (4)	College Park Center; 4,715	7–22
30	August 29	Phoenix	L 58–65	Montgomery (20)	Breland (11)	3 tied (3)	State Farm Arena; 3,727	7–23

September: 1–3 (Home: 1–1; Road: 0–2)

Game	Date	Opponent	Score	High points	High rebounds	High assists	Location/Attendance	Record
31	September 1	@ Seattle	L 75–92	Tied (15)	Williams (6)	Bentley (5)	Alaska Airlines Arena; 9,000	7–24
32	September 3	@ Los Angeles	L 60–70	Tied (15)	Billings (10)	Montgomery (4)	Staples Center; 9,889	7–25
33	September 5	Las Vegas	W 78–74	Williams (20)	Billings (14)	Bentley (8)	State Farm Arena; 4,023	8–25
34	September 8	New York	L 63–71	Bentley (17)	Breland (12)	Breland (4)	State Farm Arena; 5,495	8–26

2019 season schedule

== Standings ==
#	Eastern Conference	W	L	PCT	GB	Home	Road	Conf.
1	Washington Mystics (1)	26	8	.765	–	14–3	12–5	13–3
2	Connecticut Sun (2)	23	11	.676	3	15–2	8–9	11–5
3	Chicago Sky (5)	20	14	.588	6	12–5	8–9	11–5
4	e –Indiana Fever	13	21	.382	13	7–10	6–11	7–9
5	e –New York Liberty	10	24	.294	16	4–13	6–11	3–13
6	e –Atlanta Dream	8	26	.235	18	5–12	3–14	3–13

Notes

(#) – Conference Standing, Playoff Seeds shown to the right of team name
e – Eliminated from playoffs

== Statistics ==
Legend
GP	Games played	GS	Games started	MPG	Minutes per game	RPG	Rebounds per game
APG	Assists per game	SPG	Steals per game	BPG	Blocks per game	PPG	Points per game
FG%	Field-goal percentage	3P%	3-point field-goal percentage	FT%	Free-throw percentage	TO	Turnovers per game
PF	Fouls per game		Team leader		League leader

=== Regular season ===
Player	GP	GS	MPG	FG%	3P%	FT%	RPG	APG	SPG	BPG	PPG
Tiffany Hayes	29	29	28.2	39.3	30.8	76.4	3.0	2.8	1.0	0.3	14.7
Brittney Sykes	34	27	25.9	36.5	25.9	70.3	4.4	2.5	0.6	0.5	10.2
Renee Montgomery	34	34	27.9	37.0	32.4	82.4	2.2	2.6	0.9	0.5	9.5
Elizabeth Williams	32	32	28.4	45.5	0.0	73.2	6.5	1.2	0.8	1.7	9.3
Alex Bentley	29	4	21.9	30.7	23.5	85.7	1.9	3.0	0.7	0.3	9.0
Jessica Breland	33	33	23.2	37.8	23.7	87.9	7.3	1.7	1.3	1.1	7.5
Monique Billings	29	2	19.1	38.9	100	78.3	6.9	0.6	0.6	0.4	5.5
Nia Coffey	28	6	13.9	33.8	37.9	54.8	2.8	0.4	0.5	0.5	5.0
Marie Gülich	31	1	11.3	36.1	32.0	72.7	2.7	0.6	0.2	0.8	3.3
Maite Cazorla	31	1	15.4	31.2	23.6	87.5	0.7	1.6	0.6	0	3.0
Alaina Coates	9	0	8.3	64.3	0	53.8	3.0	0.1	0.2	0.7	2.8
Angel McCoughtry	1	1	0	0	0	0	0	0	0	0	0
