= 2019 Dallas Wings season =

- Head coach: Brian Agler
- Arena: College Park Center

Results
- Record: 10–24 (.294)
- Place: 6th (Western)
- Playoff finish: Did not qualify

Media
- Television: Fox Sports Southwest

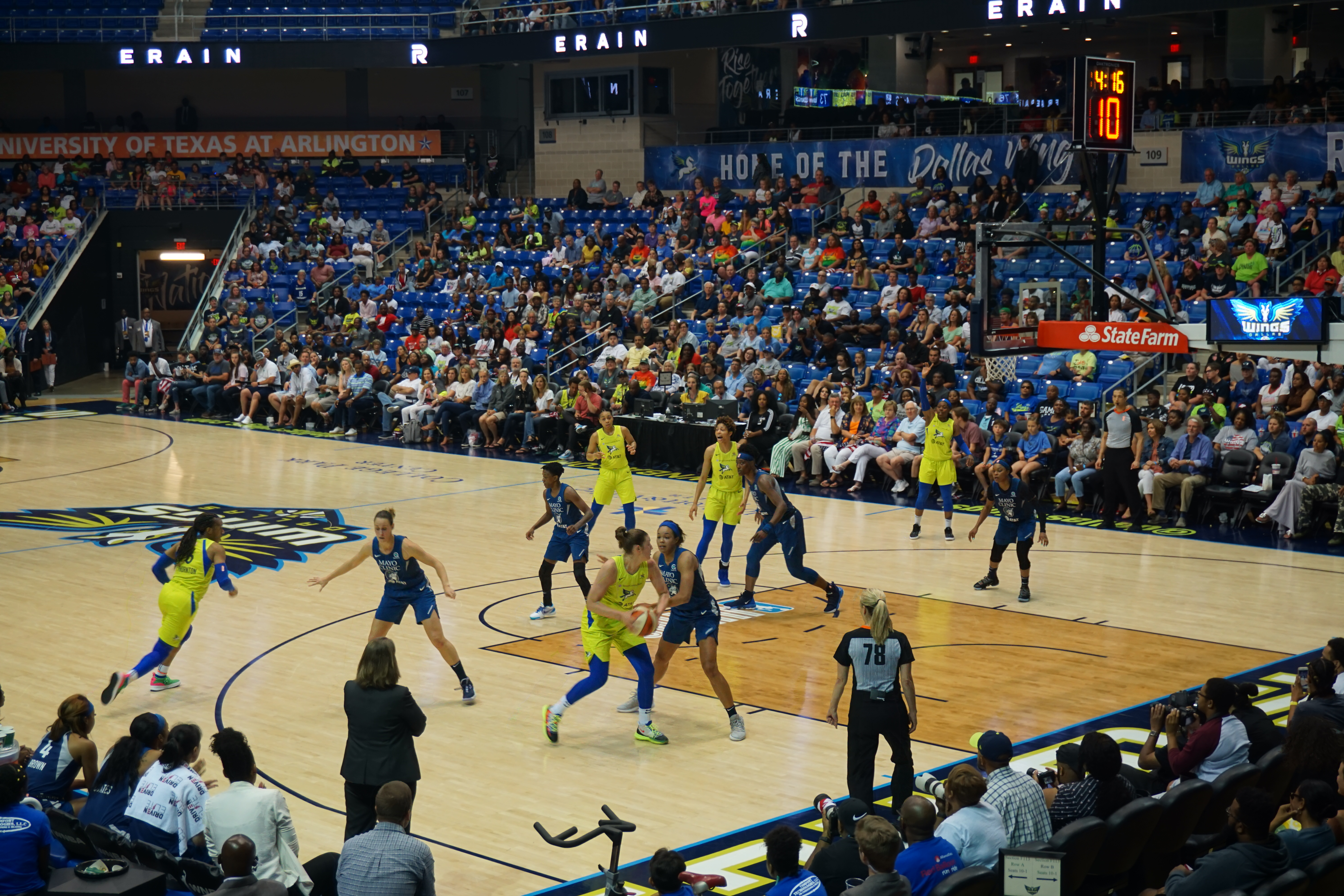
The Wings in action against Minnesota

The 2019 WNBA season was the 22nd season for the Dallas Wings franchise of the WNBA. This was the franchise's 4th season in Dallas. The season tipped off on May 24, 2019 versus the Atlanta Dream.

During the off-season, interim coach Taj McWilliams-Franklin was not retained. Brian Agler was hired from the Los Angeles Sparks to become the team's new head coach.

The Wings started the season slowly, losing their first five games in a row. However, they turned things around, winning 4 of their next 6 to finish June with a 4–7 record. July proved to be disastrous for the Wings. They posted a 1–8 record in July only beating the Los Angeles Sparks at home. The Wings managed to turn things around in August, going 5–6 overall. Three of those five wins game against eventual playoff teams. The team couldn't keep the momentum going, finishing the season on a 4 game losing streak. Their final record of 10–24, was the franchises worst record since moving to Dallas, and worst record since 2012. Rookie Arike Ogunbowale proved to be a bright spot for the team. She won Rookie of the Month in June and August and lead the team in points scored per game, and assists per game.

== Transactions ==
=== WNBA draft ===
Round	Pick	Player	Nationality	School/Team/Country
1	5	Arike Ogunbowale	United States	Notre Dame
2	17	Megan Gustafson	United States	Iowa
2	22	Kennedy Burke	United States	UCLA
3	29	Morgan Bertsch	United States	UC Davis

=== Trades and roster changes ===
Date	Details
February 1, 2019	Re-signed F Kayla Thornton
February 1, 2019	Re-signed F Glory Johnson
February 1, 2019	Re-signed C Cayla George
February 19, 2019	Signed G Brooke McCarty-Williams
February 25, 2019	Signed G Nicole Seekamp
May 16, 2019	Traded C Liz Cambage to the Las Vegas Aces for G Moriah Jefferson, C Isabelle Harrison, the Aces' first and second round picks in the 2020 WNBA draft
May 16, 2019	Traded third round pick in the 2020 WNBA draft to Atlanta Dream for C Imani McGee-Stafford
June 13, 2019	Signed C Megan Gustafson
August 6, 2019	Traded C/F Theresa Plaisance to Connecticut Sun in exchange for C/F Kristine Anigwe

== Roster ==
2019 Dallas Wings roster
Players
Coaches

Pos.	No.	Nat.	Name	Height	Weight	DOB	From	Yrs
F/c	31	(United States)	Anigwe, Kristine	6' 4" (1.93m)	200 lb (91kg)	1997-03-31	California	R
G	3	(United States)	Davis, Kaela	6' 2" (1.88m)	170 lb (77kg)	1995-03-15	South Carolina	2
G	4	(United States)	Diggins-Smith, Skylar	5' 9" (1.75m)	145 lb (66kg)	1990-08-02	Notre Dame	6
G	15	(United States)	Gray, Allisha	6' 0" (1.83m)	167 lb (76kg)	1995-01-12	South Carolina	2
F	13	(United States)	Gustafson, Megan	6' 3" (1.91m)	195 lb (88kg)	1996-12-13	Iowa	R
F	20	(United States)	Harrison, Isabelle	6' 3" (1.91m)	183 lb (83kg)	1993-09-27	Tennessee	3
G	2	(United States)	Hill, Tayler	5' 9" (1.75m)	145 lb (66kg)	1990-10-23	Ohio State	6
G		(United States)	Jefferson, Moriah	5' 6" (1.68m)	123 lb (56kg)	1994-03-08	Connecticut	3
F	25	(United States)	Johnson, Glory	6' 3" (1.91m)	170 lb (77kg)	1990-07-27	Tennessee	6
G	1	(United States)	McCarty-Williams, Brooke	5' 4" (1.63m)		1995-10-02	Texas	R
C	34	(United States)	McGee-Stafford, Imani	6' 7" (2.01m)	215 lb (98kg)	1994-10-11	Texas	3
G	24	(United States)	Ogunbowale, Arike	5' 8" (1.73m)	165 lb (75kg)	1997-03-02	Notre Dame	R
G	44	(United States)	Samuelson, Karlie	6' 0" (1.83m)	160 lb (73kg)	1995-05-10	Stanford	1
F/C	30	(United States)	Stevens, Azurá	6' 6" (1.98m)	180 lb (82kg)	1996-02-01	Connecticut	1
F	6	(United States)	Thornton, Kayla	6' 1" (1.85m)	190 lb (86kg)	1992-10-20	UTEP	3

Head coach
(United States) Brian Agler (St. Edward's)
Assistant coaches
(Australia) Erin Phillips (Australia)
(United States) Crystal Robinson (SE Oklahoma State)
Athletic trainer
(United States) Allison Russell (Tulsa)
Strength and conditioning coach
(England) Danny Wardell (Huddersfield)

Legend

- (C) Team captain
- (DP) Unsigned draft pick
- (FA) Free agent
- (S) Suspended
- Injured

== Game log ==
=== Pre-season ===
2019 pre-season game log
May: 1–2 (Home: 0–1; Road: 1–1)

Game	Date	Team	Score	High points	High rebounds	High assists	Location Attendance	Record
1	May 13	vs. Atlanta Dream	L 59–82	Burke (11)	3 tied (5)	3 tied (2)	Mohegan Sun Arena; 3,300	0–1
2	May 14	@ Connecticut Sun	W 71–67	Ogunbowale (19)	Gray (10)	3 tied (2)	Mohegan Sun Arena; 3,965	1–1
3	May 19	Indiana Fever	L 66–71	McCarty–Williams (14)	Gray (5)	3 tied (2)	College Park Center; 3,428	1–2

2019 pre-season schedule

=== Regular season ===
2019 game log
Total: 10–24 (Home: 8–9; Road: 2–15)
May: 0–1 (Home: 0–0; Road: 0–1)

Game	Date	Team	Score	High points	High rebounds	High assists	Location Attendance	Record
1	May 24	@ Atlanta Dream	L 72–76	Gray (14)	Johnson (9)	McCarty–Williams (8)	State Farm Arena; 3,070	0–1

June : 4–6 (Home: 4–2; Road: 0–4)

Game	Date	Team	Score	High points	High rebounds	High assists	Location Attendance	Record
2	June 1	Minnesota Lynx	L 67–70	Thornton (12)	Stevens (8)	Thornton (3)	College Park Center; 6,535	0–2
3	June 7	@ Indiana Fever	L 64–79	Harrison (18)	Tied (7)	McCarty–Williams (4)	Bankers Life Fieldhouse; 3,671	0–3
4	June 9	@ Washington Mystics	L 62–86	Johnson (15)	Johnson (9)	Davis (5)	St. Elizabeth's East Arena; 3,564	0–4
5	June 13	Indiana Fever	L 72–76	Thornton (19)	Gray (8)	Plaisance (4)	College Park Center; 3,562	0–5
6	June 15	Atlanta Dream	W 71–61	Ogunbowale (17)	Gray (8)	Johnson (4)	College Park Center; 5,220	1–5
7	June 20	Phoenix Mercury	W 69–54	Thornton (18)	Tied (11)	Tied (3)	College Park Center; 4,626	2–5
8	June 22	@ Las Vegas Aces	L 68–86	Ogunbowale (25)	Thornton (10)	McCarty–Williams (5)	Mandalay Bay Events Center; 4,347	2–6
9	June 26	Connecticut Sun	W 74–73	Ogunbowale (23)	Gray (7)	Plaisance (5)	College Park Center; 4,017	3–6
10	June 28	@ New York Liberty	L 68–69	Thornton (20)	Plaisance (10)	Ogunbowale (5)	Westchester County Center; 2,191	3–7
11	June 30	Minnesota Lynx	W 89–86	Ogunbowale (19)	Plaisance (10)	3 tied (5)	College Park Center; 4,521	4–7

July : 1–8 (Home: 1–3; Road: 0–5)

Game	Date	Team	Score	High points	High rebounds	High assists	Location Attendance	Record
12	July 5	Indiana Fever	L 56–76	Tied (15)	Plaisance (7)	McCarty–Williams (4)	College Park Center; 5,093	4–8
13	July 7	@ Chicago Sky	L 66–78	Ogunbowale (22)	Tied (8)	Tied (5)	Wintrust Arena; 6,102	4–9
14	July 9	Los Angeles Sparks	W 74–62	Thornton (17)	Tied (6)	Davis (4)	College Park Center; 6,885	5–9
15	July 12	@ Seattle Storm	L 81–95	Ogunbowale (23)	Johnson (9)	Davis (9)	Alaska Airlines Arena; 6,451	5–10
16	July 14	Chicago Sky	L 79–89	Ogunbowale (20)	McGee-Stafford (8)	Gray (4)	College Park Center; 4,261	5–11
17	July 17	@ Phoenix Mercury	L 64–69	Ogunbowale (14)	McGee-Stafford (11)	Tied (3)	Talking Stick Resort Arena; 10,143	5–12
18	July 18	@ Los Angeles Sparks	L 64–69	Harrison (14)	Harrison (9)	Ogunbowale (7)	Staples Center; 14,050	5–13
19	July 20	Phoenix Mercury	L 66–70	Thornton (16)	Plaisance (10)	Tied (3)	College Park Center; 5,471	5–14
20	July 30	@ Las Vegas Aces	L 54–86	Ogunbowale (14)	Tied (8)	Gray (4)	Mandalay Bay Events Center; 3,756	5–15

August : 5–6 (Home: 3–3; Road: 2–3)

Game	Date	Team	Score	High points	High rebounds	High assists	Location Attendance	Record
21	August 1	New York Liberty	W 78–64	Ogunbowale (22)	Gustafson (8)	Gray (9)	College Park Center; 4,011	6–15
22	August 3	Las Vegas Aces	L 70–75	Ogunbowale (24)	3 tied (4)	Gray (4)	College Park Center; 5,882	6–16
23	August 8	@ Seattle Storm	L 57–69	Thornton (14)	Harrison (7)	Ogunbowale (6)	Angel of the Winds Arena; 6,268	6–17
24	August 10	@ Phoenix Mercury	W 80–77	Ogunbowale (23)	Harrison (9)	Ogunbowale (4)	Talking Stick Resort Arena; 9,717	7–17
25	August 14	Los Angeles Sparks	W 84–78	Ogunbowale (35)	3 tied (6)	3 tied (2)	College Park Center; 5,004	8–17
26	August 16	New York Liberty	W 83–77	Gray (22)	Tied (7)	Ogunbowale (5)	College Park Center; 4,070	9–17
27	August 18	@ Connecticut Sun	L 68–78	Gray (22)	Harrison (13)	Harrison (4)	Mohegan Sun Arena; 7,275	9–18
28	August 22	@ Minnesota Lynx	L 70–86	Ogunbowale (22)	McCarty–Williams (5)	Tied (3)	Target Center; 8,124	9–19
29	August 25	Atlanta Dream	L 73–77	Ogunbowale (29)	Harrison (10)	Tied (2)	College Park Center; 4,715	9–20
30	August 29	@ Chicago Sky	W 88–83	Ogunbowale (35)	Harrison (12)	Ogunbowale (6)	Wintrust Arena; 5,614	10–20
31	August 31	Washington Mystics	L 85–91	Ogunbowale (30)	Anigwe (9)	Ogunbowale (7)	College Park Center; 5,205	10–21

September : 0–3 (Home: 0–1; Road: 0–2)

Game	Date	Team	Score	High points	High rebounds	High assists	Location Attendance	Record
32	September 4	@ Connecticut Sun	72–102	Ogunbowale (32)	3 tied (4)	Ogunbowale (6)	Mohegan Sun Arena; 6,284	10–22
33	September 6	@ Washington Mystics	L 73–86	Ogunbowale (30)	Tied (8)	Ogunbowale (6)	St. Elizabeth's East Arena; 3,963	10–23
34	September 8	Seattle Storm	L 64–78	Ogunbowale (25)	Harrison (8)	Ogunbowale (5)	College Park Center; 5,910	10–24

2019 season schedule

== Standings ==
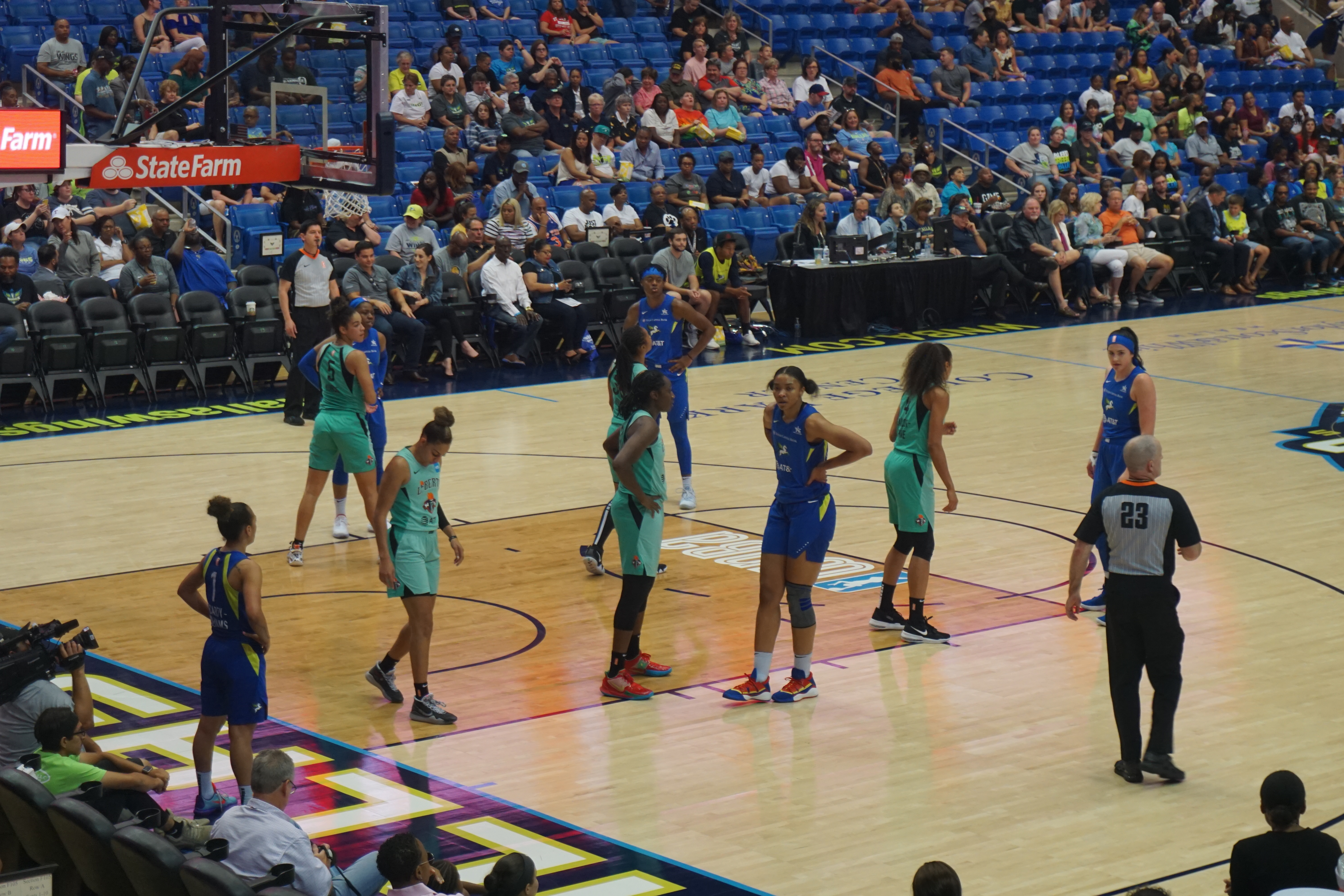
The Wings in action against New York

#	Western Conference	W	L	PCT	GB	Home	Road	Conf.
1	Los Angeles Sparks (3)	22	12	.647	–	15–2	7–10	10–6
2	Las Vegas Aces (4)	21	13	.618	1	13–4	8–9	11–5
3	Seattle Storm (6)	18	16	.529	4	11–6	7–10	10–6
4	Minnesota Lynx (7)	18	16	.529	4	11–6	7–10	7–9
5	Phoenix Mercury (8)	15	19	.441	7	9–8	6–11	5–11
6	e – Dallas Wings	10	24	.294	12	8–9	2–15	5–11

== Statistics ==
Legend
GP	Games played	GS	Games started	MPG	Minutes per game	RPG	Rebounds per game
APG	Assists per game	SPG	Steals per game	BPG	Blocks per game	PPG	Points per game
FG%	Field-goal percentage	3P%	3-point field-goal percentage	FT%	Free-throw percentage	TO	Turnovers per game
PF	Fouls per game		Team leader		League leader

=== Regular season ===
Player	GP	GS	MPG	FG%	3P%	FT%	RPG	APG	SPG	BPG	PPG
Arike Ogunbowale	33	28	32.1	38.8	35.2	81.5	2.4	3.2	1.1	0.0	19.1
Allisha Gray	34	29	30.4	45.7	38.4	84.8	4.1	2.3	1.2	0.4	10.6
Kayla Thornton	27	25	30.4	34.3	27.2	93.1	5.3	1.8	0.9	0.3	10.4
Isabelle Harrison	31	29	25.6	45.6	0	71.6	5.8	1.4	1.1	0.8	8.6
Glory Johnson	28	19	24.1	36.4	34.0	58.3	5.1	1.4	1.4	0.6	7.3
Kaela Davis	33	16	19.2	32.9	31.4	87.9	2.2	2.1	0.5	0.2	6.0
Azurá Stevens	9	1	16.0	35.8	11.1	80.0	3.6	0.6	0.6	1.1	4.8
Imani McGee-Stafford	29	6	11.9	46.8	25.0	64.3	3.8	0.6	0.6	0.6	3.9
Tayler Hill	4	2	12.3	30.8	16.7	80.0	1.3	0.8	0.3	0	3.3
Kristine Anigwe	10	0	12.9	33.3	0	66.7	3.6	0.3	0.3	0.4	3.2
Megan Gustafson	25	0	9.5	49.1	11.1	90.0	2.5	0.3	0.2	0.2	2.9
Brooke McCarty-Williams	34	3	13.1	28.9	36.0	91.7	1.3	1.9	0.5	0	2.4
Karlie Samuelson	4	0	12.0	28.6	33.3	0	0.5	0.5	0.8	0.3	1.5

== Awards and honors ==
Recipient	Award	Date awarded	Ref.
Arike Ogunbowale	WNBA Rookie of the Month - June	July 2, 2019	
Arike Ogunbowale	WNBA Western Conference Player of the Week	August 19, 2019	
Arike Ogunbowale	WNBA Rookie of the Month - August	September 4, 2019	
Arike Ogunbowale	WNBA All-Rookie Team	September 16, 2019	
