= Hines-Allen =

Hines-Allen is a surname. Notable people with the surname include:

- Josh Hines-Allen (born 1997), American football player
- Myisha Hines-Allen (born 1995), American basketball player
