= 2019 Washington Mystics season =

- WNBA champions
- Head coach: Mike Thibault
- Arena: St. Elizabeths East Arena

Results
- Record: 26–8 (.765)
- Place: 1st (Eastern)
- Playoff finish: 1st seed; WNBA Champions, beat Connecticut Sun 3-2

Media
- Television: NBC Sports Washington and Monumental Sports Network

The 2019 WNBA season was the 22nd for the Washington Mystics of the Women's National Basketball Association. The season ended with the Mystics winning their first WNBA Championship.

The Mystics began playing at the St. Elizabeths East Entertainment and Sports Arena in the 2019 season. The arena holds a maximum of 4,200 spectators per game.

They began the season on May 25, 2019 versus the Connecticut Sun. On August 31, with a victory over the Dallas Wings, the Mystics set a franchise record for wins at 23. The previous record was 22, held jointly by the 2010 and 2018 teams. They entered the playoffs as the top-seeded team, and defeated the Las Vegas Aces in the semifinals and the Connecticut Sun in the WNBA Finals.

== Transactions ==
=== WNBA draft ===
Round	Pick	Player	Nationality	School/Team/Country
1	10	Kiara Leslie	United States	NC State
3	34	Sam Fuehring	United States	Louisville

=== Trades/Roster Changes ===
Date	Details
February 1, 2019	Re-signed G Natasha Cloud
February 4, 2019	Re-signed F LaToya Sanders

== Roster ==
2019 Washington Mystics roster
Players
Coaches

Pos.	No.	Nat.	Name	Height	Weight	DOB	From	Yrs
G	7	(United States)	Atkins, Ariel	5' 11" (1.8m)	167 lb (76kg)	1996-07-30	Texas	1
G	15	(United States)	Cloud, Natasha	5' 9" (1.75m)	160 lb (73kg)	1992-02-22	Saint Joseph's	4
G/F	11	(United States)	Delle Donne, Elena	6' 5" (1.96m)	187 lb (85kg)	1989-09-05	Delaware	6
F	21	(United States)	Hawkins, Tianna	6' 3" (1.91m)	186 lb (84kg)	1991-03-02	Maryland	5
F	2	(United States)	Hines-Allen, Myisha	6' 2" (1.88m)	200 lb (91kg)	1996-05-30	Louisville	1
G	5	(United States)	Leslie, Kiara	6' 0" (1.83m)	175 lb (79kg)	1995-12-06	NC State	R
F	33	(Belgium)	Meesseman, Emma	6' 4" (1.93m)	191 lb (87kg)	1993-05-13	Belgium	5
G	6	(Belgium)	Mestdagh, Kim	5' 9" (1.75m)	154 lb (70kg)	1990-03-12	Colorado State	R
G/F	23	(United States)	Powers, Aerial	5' 9" (1.75m)	159 lb (72kg)	1994-07-17	Michigan State	3
F/C	30	(United States)	Sanders, LaToya	6' 2" (1.88m)	170 lb (77kg)	1986-09-11	North Carolina	6
G	20	(United States)	Toliver, Kristi	5' 7" (1.7m)	130 lb (59kg)	1987-01-27	Maryland	10
G	32	(United States)	Walker-Kimbrough, Shatori	5' 9" (1.75m)	140 lb (64kg)	1995-05-18	Maryland	2

Head coach
(United States) Mike Thibault (Saint Martin's)
Assistant coaches
(United States) Marianne Stanley (Immaculata)
(United States) Eric Thibault (Missouri)
Athletic trainer
(United States) Chalisa Fonza (Western Illinois)

Legend

- (C) Team captain
- (DP) Unsigned draft pick
- (FA) Free agent
- (S) Suspended
- Injured

== Game log ==
=== Preseason ===
2019 pre-season game log
May: 1–1 (Home: 0–0; Road: 1–1)

Game	Date	Team	Score	High points	High rebounds	High assists	Location Attendance	Record
1	May 10	@ Minnesota Lynx	L 79–86	Meesseman (19)	Meesseman (6)	3 tied (3)	Target Center; 3,201	0–1
2	May 17	@ Atlanta Dream	W 75–64	Walker-Kimbrough (18)	Sanders (5)	3 tied (3)	Albany Civic Center; N/A	1–1

2019 pre-season schedule

=== Regular season ===
2019 game log
Total: 26–8 (Home: 14–3; Road: 12–5)
May: 0–1 (Home: 0–0; Road: 0–1)

Game	Date	Team	Score	High points	High rebounds	High assists	Location Attendance	Record
1	May 25	@ Connecticut Sun	L 69–84	Meesseman (14)	Sanders (9)	Cloud (8)	Mohegan Sun Arena; 7,913	0–1

June : 9–2 (Home: 4–1; Road: 5–1)

Game	Date	Team	Score	High points	High rebounds	High assists	Location Attendance	Record
2	June 1	Atlanta Dream	W 96–75	Atkins (21)	Hines-Allen (8)	Toliver (5)	St. Elizabeth's East Arena; 4,200	1–1
3	June 5	Chicago Sky	W 103–85	Toliver (19)	Delle Donne (7)	Toliver (6)	St. Elizabeth's East Arena; 2,347	2–1
4	June 7	@ New York Liberty	W 94–85	Cloud (26)	Delle Donne (8)	Cloud (8)	Westchester County Center; 1,567	3–1
5	June 9	Dallas Wings	W 86–62	Hawkins (21)	Delle Donne (9)	Toliver (6)	Westchester County Center; 3,564	4–1
6	June 11	@ Connecticut Sun	L 75–83	Atkins (18)	Sanders (8)	Cloud (8)	Mohegan Sun Arena; 5,224	4–2
7	June 14	Seattle Storm	L 71–74	Delle Donne (19)	Tied (8)	Cloud (5)	St. Elizabeth's East Arena; 3,654	4–3
8	June 18	@ Los Angeles Sparks	W 81–52	Atkins (22)	Delle Donne (15)	Toliver (9)	Staples Center; 9,537	5–3
9	June 20	@ Las Vegas Aces	W 95–72	Delle Donne (29)	Delle Donne (11)	Cloud (7)	Mandalay Bay Events Center; 4,416	6–3
10	June 23	@ Atlanta Dream	W 89–73	Delle Donne (21)	Delle Donne (10)	Cloud (6)	State Farm Arena; 4,136	7–3
11	June 26	@ Chicago Sky	W 81–74	Delle Donne (22)	Delle Donne (7)	Cloud (5)	Wintrust Arena; 8,914	8–3
12	June 29	Connecticut Sun	W 102–59	Delle Donne (19)	Delle Donne (10)	Cloud (6)	St. Elizabeth's East Arena; 4,200	9–3

July : 5–3 (Home: 3–2; Road: 2–1)

Game	Date	Team	Score	High points	High rebounds	High assists	Location Attendance	Record
13	July 5	@ Las Vegas Aces	W 99–70	Delle Donne (21)	Sanders (7)	Cloud (9)	Mandalay Bay Events Center; N/A	10–3
14	July 7	@ Los Angeles Sparks	L 81–98	Powers (24)	Tied (8)	Toliver (9)	Staples Center; 10,336	10–4
15	July 10	Phoenix Mercury	L 68–91	Hawkins (24)	Hawkins (7)	Toliver (6)	Capital One Arena; 15,377	10–5
16	July 13	Las Vegas Aces	L 81–85	Cloud (18)	Sanders (10)	Toliver (7)	St. Elizabeth's East Arena; 4,200	10–6
17	July 19	@ Indiana Fever	W 95–88 (OT)	Delle Donne (28)	Delle Donne (15)	Cloud (7)	Bankers Life Fieldhouse; 6,726	11–6
18	July 21	Atlanta Dream	W 93–65	Delle Donne (28)	Delle Donne (8)	Toliver (7)	St. Elizabeth's East Arena; 4,200	12–6
19	July 24	Minnesota Lynx	W 79–71	Toliver (32)	Meesseman (6)	Toliver (6)	Target Center; 17,934	13–6
20	July 30	Phoenix Mercury	W 99–93	Delle Donne (33)	Powers (8)	Cloud (6)	St. Elizabeth's East Arena; 3,819	14–6

August : 9–2 (Home: 6–0; Road: 3–2)

Game	Date	Team	Score	High points	High rebounds	High assists	Location Attendance	Record
21	August 2	@ Seattle Storm	W 99–79	Delle Donne (29)	Delle Donne (12)	Tied (5)	Angel of the Winds Arena; 7,488	15–6
22	August 4	@ Phoenix Mercury	L 82–103	Tied (18)	Tied (7)	Cloud (7)	Talking Stick Resort Arena; 9,025	15–7
23	August 8	Indiana Fever	W 91–78	Delle Donne (22)	Delle Donne (8)	Toliver (11)	St. Elizabeth's East Arena; 3,013	16–7
24	August 11	Minnesota Lynx	W 101–78	Meesseman (25)	Delle Donne (10)	Cloud (4)	St. Elizabeth's East Arena; 4,200	17–7
25	August 14	Seattle Storm	W 88–59	Powers (16)	Sanders (8)	5 tied (3)	St. Elizabeth's East Arena; 3,917	18–7
26	August 16	@ Minnesota Lynx	W 86–79	Atkins (18)	Delle Donne (8)	Tied (8)	Target Center; 8,803	19–7
27	August 18	Indiana Fever	W 107–68	Delle Donne (25)	Delle Donne (9)	Cloud (8)	St. Elizabeth's East Arena; 4,034	20–7
28	August 23	@ Chicago Sky	L 78–85	Delle Donne (16)	Delle Donne (7)	Powers (5)	Wintrust Arena; 6,131	20–8
29	August 25	New York Liberty	W 101–72	Delle Donne (22)	Delle Donne (10)	Tied (5)	St. Elizabeth's East Arena; 4,200	21–8
30	August 27	Los Angeles Sparks	W 95–66	Powers (20)	Sanders (9)	Cloud (6)	St. Elizabeth's East Arena; 4,200	22–8
31	August 31	@ Dallas Wings	W 91–85	Delle Donne (22)	Sanders (11)	Meesseman (7)	College Park Center; 5,205	23–8

September : 3–0 (Home: 2–0; Road: 1–0)

Game	Date	Team	Score	High points	High rebounds	High assists	Location Attendance	Record
32	September 3	@ New York Liberty	W 93–77	Delle Donne (30)	Tied (10)	Cloud (9)	Westchester County Center; 1,558	24–8
33	September 6	Dallas Wings	W 86–73	Meesseman (25)	Meesseman (10)	Tied (5)	St. Elizabeth's East Arena; 3,963	25–8
34	September 8	Chicago Sky	W 100–86	Delle Donne (25)	Delle Donne (12)	Cloud (6)	St. Elizabeth's East Arena; 4,200	26–8

2019 season schedule

=== Playoffs ===
2019 playoff game log
Total: 6–3 (Home: 4–1; Road: 2–1)
Semifinals: 3–1 (Home: 2–0; Road: 1–1)

Game	Date	Team	Score	High points	High rebounds	High assists	Location Attendance	Series
1	September 17	Las Vegas Aces	W 97–95	Meesseman (27)	Meesseman (10)	Delle Donne (6)	St. Elizabeth's East Arena; 3,968	1–0
2	September 19	Las Vegas Aces	W 103–91	Meesseman (30)	Delle Donne (10)	Cloud (11)	St. Elizabeth's East Arena; 4,200	2–0
3	September 22	@ Las Vegas Aces	L 75–92	Delle Donne (22)	Meesseman (8)	Cloud (6)	Mandalay Bay Events Center; 6,175	2–1
4	September 24	@ Las Vegas Aces	W 94–90	Delle Donne (25)	3 tied (6)	Tied (9)	Mandalay Bay Events Center; 5,465	3–1

WNBA Finals: 3–2 (Home: 2–1; Road: 1–1)

Game	Date	Team	Score	High points	High rebounds	High assists	Location Attendance	Series
1	September 29	Connecticut Sun	W 95–86	Delle Donne (22)	Delle Donne (10)	Cloud (7)	St. Elizabeth's East Arena; 4,200	1–0
2	October 1	Connecticut Sun	L 87–99	Meesseman (23)	Meesseman (8)	Toliver (7)	St. Elizabeth's East Arena; 4,200	1–1
3	October 6	@ Connecticut Sun	W 94–81	Meesseman (21)	Powers (8)	Toliver (10)	Mohegan Sun Arena; 9,170	2–1
4	October 8	@ Connecticut Sun	L 86–90	Powers (15)	Cloud (7)	Cloud (9)	Mohegan Sun Arena; 8,458	2–2
5	October 10	Connecticut Sun	W 89–78	Meesseman (22)	Delle Donne (9)	Toliver (4)	St. Elizabeth's East Arena; 4,200	3–2

2019 playoff schedule

== Standings ==
#	Eastern Conference	W	L	PCT	GB	Home	Road	Conf.
1	Washington Mystics (1)	26	8	.765	–	14–3	12–5	13–3
2	Connecticut Sun (2)	23	11	.676	3	15–2	8–9	11–5
3	Chicago Sky (5)	20	14	.588	6	12–5	8–9	11–5
4	e –Indiana Fever	13	21	.382	13	7–10	6–11	7–9
5	e –New York Liberty	10	24	.294	16	4–13	6–11	3–13
6	e –Atlanta Dream	8	26	.235	18	5–12	3–14	3–13

== Playoffs ==
**First round** Single elimination (Sept. 11)
5	**Chicago Sky**	**105**
8	Phoenix Mercury	76
6	**Seattle Storm**	**84**
7	Minnesota Lynx	74

**Second round** Single elimination (Sept. 15)
4	**Las Vegas Aces**	**93**
5	Chicago Sky	92
3	**Los Angeles Sparks**	**92**
6	Seattle Storm	69

**Semifinals**; Best-of-5 (Sept. 17 – 24)
1	**Washington Mystics**	**3**
4	Las Vegas Aces	1
2	**Connecticut Sun**	**3**
3	Los Angeles Sparks	0

**WNBA Finals**; Best-of-5 (Sept. 29 – Oct. 10)
1	**Washington Mystics**	**3**
2	Connecticut Sun	2

Note: Teams re-seeded after each round.

- **Bold** – Game or series winner
- Italic – Team with home-court advantage

== Statistics ==
Legend
GP	Games played	GS	Games started	MPG	Minutes per game	RPG	Rebounds per game
APG	Assists per game	SPG	Steals per game	BPG	Blocks per game	PPG	Points per game
FG%	Field-goal percentage	3P%	3-point field-goal percentage	FT%	Free-throw percentage	TO	Turnovers per game
PF	Fouls per game		Team leader		League leader

=== Regular season ===
Player	GP	GS	MPG	FG%	3P%	FT%	RPG	APG	SPG	BPG	PPG
Elena Delle Donne	31	31	29.1	51.5	43.0	97.4	8.3	2.2	0.6	1.3	19.5
Emma Meesseman	23	6	23.6	55.2	42.2	90.5	4.2	3.2	0.9	0.7	13.1
Kristi Toliver	23	23	29.5	49.4	36.0	85.7	2.9	6.0	1.2	0.1	13.0
Aerial Powers	30	7	19.8	43.4	36.2	86.7	3.2	1.5	0.8	0.2	11.4
Ariel Atkins	33	33	24.4	41.6	35.7	81.1	2.8	1.9	1.5	0.5	10.3
Tianna Hawkins	31	1	15.4	51.4	36.3	92.5	4.2	0.7	0.5	0.1	9.5
Natasha Cloud	34	34	32.1	39.4	32.6	68.3	2.5	5.6	1.0	0.2	9.0
Shatori Walker-Kimbrough	34	1	17.1	43.2	31.0	93.0	1.6	1.2	0.8	0.2	6.7
LaToya Sanders	34	34	23.6	50.6	0	89.2	5.5	1.9	0.9	1.4	6.1
Myisha Hines-Allen	27	0	7.8	36.2	37.5	58.3	2.1	0.9	0.3	0.4	7.8
Shey Peddy	15	0	4.7	61.5	50.0	100	0.6	0.5	0.3	0.0	1.7
Kim Mestdagh	15	0	4.7	38.9	40.0	100	0.3	0.4	0.1	0.0	1.5

== Awards and honors ==
Recipient	Award	Date awarded	Ref.
Elena Delle Donne	WNBA Eastern Conference Player of the Week	June 24, 2019	
Elena Delle Donne	WNBA Eastern Conference Player of the Week	July 1, 2019	
Elena Delle Donne	WNBA Eastern Conference Player of the Month - June	July 1, 2019	
Mike Thibault	WNBA Coach of the Month - June	July 2, 2019	
Elena Delle Donne	WNBA All-Star Selection	July 15, 2019	
Kristi Toliver	WNBA All-Star Selection	July 15, 2019	
Elena Delle Donne	WNBA Eastern Conference Player of the Week	July 22, 2019	
Elena Delle Donne	WNBA Eastern Conference Player of the Month - July	August 1, 2019	
Elena Delle Donne	WNBA Eastern Conference Player of the Week	August 5, 2019	
Elena Delle Donne	WNBA Eastern Conference Player of the Week	August 12, 2019	
Elena Delle Donne	WNBA Eastern Conference Player of the Week	August 19, 2019	
Elena Delle Donne	WNBA Eastern Conference Player of the Month - August	September 4, 2019	
Mike Thibault	WNBA Coach of the Month - August	September 4, 2019	
Elena Delle Donne	WNBA Eastern Conference Player of the Week	September 9, 2019	
Elena Delle Donne	WNBA MVP	September 19, 2019	
Emma Meesseman	WNBA Finals MVP	October 10, 2019	
