= 2019 Minnesota Lynx season =

American professional basketball season

- Head coach: Cheryl Reeve
- Arena: Target Center

Results
- Record: 18–16 (.529)
- Place: 4th (Western)
- Playoff finish: 7th Seed; Lost in First Round to Seattle

Media
- Television: Fox Sports North, ESPN, NBATV

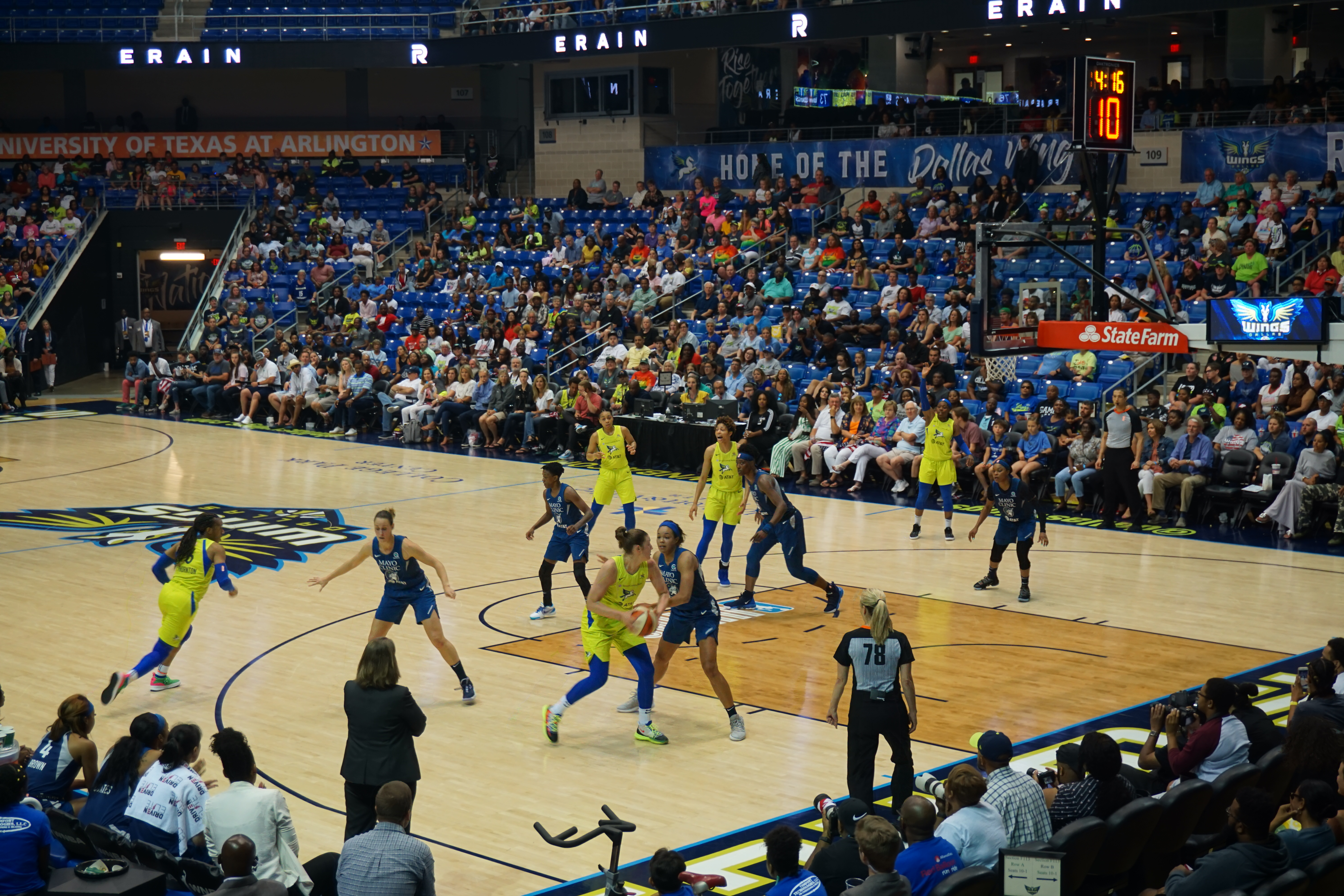
The Lynx in action at Dallas

The 2019 Minnesota Lynx season was the 21st season for the Minnesota Lynx of the Women's National Basketball Association, and the 10th season under head coach Cheryl Reeve.

The Lynx finished last season with a record of 18–16, finishing fourth in the Western Conference and seventh overall in the league, while qualifying for the playoffs, before ultimately being beat by Los Angeles in the first Round of the 2018 WNBA Playoffs.

On February 5, 2019, Maya Moore announced that she would not be playing in the 2019 season citing a need to spend more time with family and to focus on her ministry dreams. On March 14, the Lynx announced that they promoted Walt Hopkins to a full-time assistant coach, while also adding Plenette Pierson to an assistant coaching role.

Despite Moore's retirement, the Lynx started off the season strong, going on a three-game winning streak. However, they could not keep the momentum going, winning only three of their next nine games, including a four-game losing streak, to finish June with a 6–6 record. July proved to be more of the same, with the team winning their first three games in the month, but losing their last three and finishing 4–4 for the month. August was another up-and-down month. The Lynx finished 6–5 on the month, which included losing three games and then winning three games to finish the month. The team did manage to extend their three-game winning streak into a five-game winning streak, but lost their season finale.

Their final record of 18–16 earned them the seventh seed in the playoffs. They faced off against the sixth-seeded Seattle Storm. The Storm earned the right to host the game by winning the regular season series 3–1. Napheesa Collier scored a double double in her playoff debut, but it was ultimately not enough as the Lynx lost by ten points.

Collier's solid postseason continued when she won Rookie of the Year. Collier is the fourth Lynx player to win the award, and the first since Maya Moore.

== Transactions ==
=== WNBA draft ===
Round	Pick	Player	Nationality	School/team/country
1	6	Napheesa Collier	United States	Connecticut Huskies
2	16	Jessica Shepard	United States	Notre Dame
2	18	Natisha Hiedeman	United States	Marquette
2	20	Cierra Dillard	United States	Buffalo
3	30	Kenisha Bell	United States	Minnesota

=== Trades and roster changes ===
Date	Trade
February 1, 2019	Signed F Karima Christmas-Kelly
February 2, 2019	Re-Signed G Seimone Augustus
February 8, 2019	Signed F/C Damiris Dantas
February 22, 2019	Signed F Jillian Alleyne
February 28, 2019	Re-Signed F Erlana Larkins and Signed F Kelsey Griffin
April 10, 2019	Traded G Natisha Hiedeman to Connecticut in exchange for G Lexie Brown.
April 11, 2019	Traded G Tanisha Wright to New York in exchange for a second round pick in the 2020 WNBA draft.
April 17, 2019	Signed F Shao Ting
April 22, 2019	Traded G Alexis Jones to Los Angeles in exchange for G Odyssey Sims.
May 11, 2019	Waived G Cierra Dillard
May 16, 2019	Waived G Taylor Emery
May 21, 2019	Traded their third round pick in the 2020 WNBA draft to Chicago in exchange for C Alaina Coates
May 21, 2019	Traded their second round pick in the 2020 WNBA draft to Phoenix in exchange for G Stephanie Talbot
May 22, 2019	Waived F Erlana Larkins
July 2, 2019	Signed F Asia Taylor and G Kenisha Bell
July 13, 2019	Waived F Shao Ting and activated F Temi Fagbenle
July 14, 2019	Waived C Alaina Coates
July 19, 2019	Waived G Kenisha Bell
July 25, 2019	Waived F Asia Taylor
July 30, 2019	Signed F Jillian Alleyne to a 7-Day Contract
August 6, 2019	Signed F Jillian Alleyne to a 2nd 7-Day Contract
August 13, 2019	Signed F Jillian Alleyne to a 3rd 7-Day Contract
August 22, 2019	Signed F Bridget Carleton to a 7-Day Contract

=== Additions ===
Player	Date	Former team
Karima Christmas-Kelly	February 1, 2019	Dallas Wings
Damiris Dantas	February 8, 2019	Atlanta Dream
Lexie Brown	April 11, 2019	Connecticut Sun
Odyssey Sims	April 22, 2019	Los Angeles Sparks

=== Subtractions ===
Player	Date	New team/reason
Lindsay Whalen	August 13, 2018	Retirement
James Wade (assistant coach)	November 18, 2018	Chicago Sky Head Coach
Maya Moore	February 5, 2019	Taking Year Off

== Roster ==
2019 Minnesota Lynx roster
Players
Coaches

Pos.	No.	Nat.	Name	Height	Weight	DOB	From	Yrs
G	33	(United States)	Augustus, Seimone (C)	6' 0" (1.83m)	172 lb (78kg)	1984-04-30	LSU	13
G	4	(United States)	Brown, Lexie	5' 9" (1.75m)	158 lb (72kg)	1994-10-27	Duke	1
G/F	21	(Canada)	Carleton, Bridget	6' 1" (1.85m)	195 lb (88kg)	1997-05-22	Iowa State	R
F	0	(United States)	Christmas-Kelly, Karima (injured)	6' 0" (1.83m)	209 lb (95kg)	1989-09-11	Duke	8
G	24	(United States)	Collier, Napheesa	6' 2" (1.88m)	182 lb (83kg)	1996-09-23	Connecticut	R
F	92	(Brazil)	Dantas, Damiris	6' 3" (1.91m)	206 lb (93kg)	1992-11-17	Brazil	4
F	14	(United Kingdom)	Fagbenle, Temi	6' 4" (1.93m)	179 lb (81kg)	1992-09-08	USC	2
C	34	(United States)	Fowles, Sylvia (C)	6' 6" (1.98m)	227 lb (103kg)	1985-10-06	LSU	11
F	23	(United States)	Moore, Maya (S)	6' 0" (1.83m)	175 lb (79kg)	1989-06-11	Connecticut	8
G	3	(United States)	Robinson, Danielle (C)	5' 9" (1.75m)	136 lb (62kg)	1989-05-10	Oklahoma	7
F	10	(United States)	Shepard, Jessica (injured)	6' 3" (1.91m)	199 lb (90kg)	1996-09-11	Notre Dame	R
G	1	(United States)	Sims, Odyssey	5' 8" (1.73m)	163 lb (74kg)	1992-07-13	Baylor	5
F	8	(Australia)	Talbot, Stephanie	6' 2" (1.88m)	175 lb (79kg)	1994-06-15	Australia	2

Head coach
(United States) Cheryl Reeve (La Salle)
Assistant coaches
(United States) Shelley Patterson (Washington State)
(United States) Walt Hopkins (Nevada)
(United States) Plenette Pierson (Texas Tech)
Athletic trainer
(United States) Chuck Barta (UW–La Crosse)
Assistant trainer
(United States) Kate Taber (Iowa)

Legend

- (C) Team captain
- (DP) Unsigned draft pick
- (FA) Free agent
- (S) Suspended
- Injured

== Schedule ==
=== Preseason ===
2019 pre-season game log
May: 2–0 (Home: 1–0; Road: 1–0)

Game	Date	Team	Score	High points	High rebounds	High assists	Location Attendance	Record
1	May 10	Washington	W 86–79	Sims (20)	Fowles (11)	Sims (7)	Target Center; 3,201	1–0
2	May 19	@ Las Vegas	W 79–75	Sims (25)	Fowles (7)	Brown (7)	Cox Pavilion	1–1

2019 pre-season schedule

=== Regular season ===
2019 game log
Total: 18–16 (Home: 11–6; Road: 7–10)
May: 2–0 (Home: 2–0; Road: 0–0)

Game	Date	Team	Score	High points	High rebounds	High assists	Location Attendance	Record
1	May 25	Chicago	W 89–71	Collier (27)	Shepard (13)	Shepard (6)	Target Center; 8,524	1–0
2	May 29	Seattle	W 72–61	Sims (15)	Fowles (13)	Sims (5)	Target Center; 8,092	2–0

June : 4–6 (Home: 2–3; Road: 2–3)

Game	Date	Team	Score	High points	High rebounds	High assists	Location Attendance	Record
3	June 1	@ Dallas	W 70–67	Dantas (20)	Fowles (12)	Sims (5)	College Park Center; 6,535	3–0
4	June 4	@ Seattle	L 77–84	Collier (17)	Fowles (5)	Sims (6)	Angel of the Winds Arena; 5,711	3–1
5	June 6	Phoenix	W 58–56	Sims (15)	3 tied (6)	Tied (3)	Target Center; 8,001	4–1
6	June 8	Los Angeles	L 85–89	Brown (21)	Fowles (13)	Sims (7)	Target Center; 8,834	4–2
7	June 12	@ New York	L 69–75	Fowles (16)	Fowles (11)	Robinson (7)	Westchester County Center; 1,181	4–3
8	June 14	Connecticut	L 81–85	Sims (25)	Fowles (9)	Dantas (5)	Target Center; 8,803	4–4
9	June 16	Las Vegas	L 75–80	Dantas (22)	Fowles (9)	Dantas (6)	Target Center; 8,392	4–5
10	June 22	New York	W 92–83	Sims (20)	Fowles (10)	Dantas (5)	Target Center; 8,600	5–5
11	June 25	@ Indiana	W 78–74	Sims (25)	Fowles (11)	Sims (7)	Bankers Life Fieldhouse; 4,692	6–5
12	June 30	@ Dallas	L 86–89	Sims (23)	Fowles (9)	Sims (8)	College Park Center; 4,521	6–6

July : 4–4 (Home: 2–2; Road: 2–2)

Game	Date	Team	Score	High points	High rebounds	High assists	Location Attendance	Record
13	July 2	Atlanta	W 85–68	Talbot (24)	Collier (11)	Sims (8)	Target Center; 8,208	7–6
14	July 6	@ Connecticut	W 74–71	Sims (21)	Fowles (11)	Sims (8)	Mohegan Sun Arena; 8,076	8–6
15	July 10	@ Chicago	W 73–72	Sims (16)	Fowles (12)	Sims (4)	Wintrust Arena; 8,508	9–6
16	July 12	@ Atlanta	L 53–60	Robinson (14)	Fowles (12)	Sims (7)	State Farm Arena; 4,001	9–7
17	July 14	Phoenix	W 75–62	Sims (15)	Fowles (13)	Robinson (5)	Target Center; 8,801	10–7
18	July 17	Seattle	L 79–90	Brown (20)	Fowles (7)	Robinson (10)	Target Center; 8,403	10–8
19	July 21	@ Las Vegas	L 74–79	Sims (19)	Collier (6)	Tied (4)	Mandalay Bay Events Center; 4,352	10–9
20	July 24	Washington	L 71–79	Brown (19)	Fowles (12)	Sims (4)	Target Center; 17,934	10–10

August : 6–5 (Home: 4–1; Road: 2–4)

Game	Date	Team	Score	High points	High rebounds	High assists	Location Attendance	Record
21	August 3	@ Indiana	L 75–86	Fowles (17)	Collier (7)	Sims (5)	Bankers Life Fieldhouse; 7,884	10–11
22	August 6	@ Atlanta	W 85–69	Collier (22)	Tied (11)	Collier (5)	State Farm Arena; 3,395	11–11
23	August 9	Connecticut	W 89–57	Fowles (17)	Fowles (12)	Sims (9)	Target Center; 8,892	12–11
24	August 11	@ Washington	L 78–101	Sims (20)	Collier (6)	Sims (8)	St. Elizabeth's East Arena; 4,200	12–12
25	August 13	@ New York	W 89–73	Sims (17)	Fowles (8)	Sims (6)	Westchester County Center; 1,570	13–12
26	August 16	Washington	L 79–86	Fowles (16)	Collier (9)	Tied (5)	Target Center; 8,803	13–13
27	August 18	@ Seattle	L 74–82	Sims (30)	Collier (5)	Robinson (9)	Alaska Airlines Arena; 9,000	13–14
28	August 20	@ Los Angeles	L 71–81	Brown (20)	Tied (7)	Collier (4)	Staples Center; 9,244	13–15
29	August 22	Dallas	W 86–70	Collier (19)	Tied (7)	Dantas (8)	Target Center; 8,124	14–15
30	August 25	Las Vegas	W 98–77	Tied (23)	Tied (6)	Robinson (8)	Target Center; 8,834	15–15
31	August 27	Chicago	W 93–85	Fowles (25)	Fowles (12)	Sims (8)	Target Center; 8,092	16–15

September : 2–1 (Home: 1–0; Road: 1–1)

Game	Date	Team	Score	High points	High rebounds	High assists	Location Attendance	Record
32	September 1	Indiana	W 81–73	Sims (17)	Collier (10)	3 tied (4)	Target Center; 8,833	17–15
33	September 6	@ Phoenix	W 83–69	Sims (22)	Fowles (11)	Sims (9)	Talking Stick Resort Arena; 12,140	18–15
34	September 8	@ Los Angeles	L 68–77	Collier (16)	Collier (11)	Dantas (9)	Staples Center; 13,500	18–16

2019 season schedule

=== Playoffs ===
2019 playoff game log
Total: 0–1 (Home: 0–0; Road: 0–1)
First Round: 0–1 (Home: 0–0; Road: 0–1)

Game	Date	Team	Score	High points	High rebounds	High assists	Location Attendance	Series
1	September 11	@ Seattle Storm	L 74–84	Dantas (20)	Fowles (11)	Sims (5)	Angel of the Winds Arena; 5,011	0–1

2019 playoff schedule

== Standings ==
#	Western Conference	W	L	PCT	GB	Home	Road	Conf.
1	Los Angeles Sparks (3)	22	12	.647	–	15–2	7–10	10–6
2	Las Vegas Aces (4)	21	13	.618	1	13–4	8–9	11–5
3	Seattle Storm (6)	18	16	.529	4	11–6	7–10	10–6
4	Minnesota Lynx (7)	18	16	.529	4	11–6	7–10	7–9
5	Phoenix Mercury (8)	15	19	.441	7	9–8	6–11	5–11
6	e – Dallas Wings	10	24	.294	12	8–9	2–15	5–11

Notes

(#) – Conference Standing, Playoff Seeds shown to the right of team name
e – Eliminated from playoffs

== Playoffs ==
**First round** Single elimination (Sept. 11)
5	**Chicago Sky**	**105**
8	Phoenix Mercury	76
6	**Seattle Storm**	**84**
7	Minnesota Lynx	74

**Second round** Single elimination (Sept. 15)
4	**Las Vegas Aces**	**93**
5	Chicago Sky	92
3	**Los Angeles Sparks**	**92**
6	Seattle Storm	69

**Semifinals**; Best-of-5 (Sept. 17 – 24)
1	**Washington Mystics**	**3**
4	Las Vegas Aces	1
2	**Connecticut Sun**	**3**
3	Los Angeles Sparks	0

**WNBA Finals**; Best-of-5 (Sept. 29 – Oct. 10)
1	**Washington Mystics**	**3**
2	Connecticut Sun	2

Note: Teams re-seeded after each round.

- **Bold** – Game or series winner
- Italic – Team with home-court advantage

== Statistics ==
Legend
GP	Games played	GS	Games started	MPG	Minutes per game	RPG	Rebounds per game
APG	Assists per game	SPG	Steals per game	BPG	Blocks per game	PPG	Points per game
FG%	Field-goal percentage	3P%	3-point field-goal percentage	FT%	Free-throw percentage	TO	Turnovers per game
PF	Fouls per game		Team leader		League leader

=== Regular season ===
Player	GP	GS	MPG	FG%	3P%	FT%	RPG	APG	SPG	BPG	PPG
Odyssey Sims	34	34	31.9	41.5	26.9	79.5	3.4	5.4	1.4	0.1	14.5
Sylvia Fowles	34	34	29.5	58.8	0	70.7	8.9	1.5	0.9	1.4	13.6
Napheesa Collier	34	34	33.3	49.0	36.1	79.2	6.6	2.6	1.9	0.9	13.1
Danielle Robinson	34	26	27.0	43.7	22.0	87.9	3.5	3.7	1.2	0.2	10.1
Damiris Dantas	26	26	25.7	43.2	39.3	73.1	4.5	3.2	0.7	0.6	9.2
Lexie Brown	33	0	18.3	40.2	38.5	78.9	1.4	1.4	0.9	0.0	7.6
Temi Fagbenle	18	0	15.1	37.0	32.6	72.2	2.9	0.8	0.3	0.3	5.4
Stephanie Talbot	33	9	17.0	37.0	32.6	87.1	2.4	1.2	0.9	0.3	5.2
Jessica Shepard	6	0	18.7	31.3	16.7	75.0	5.7	3.5	0.3	0.2	4.8
Seimone Augustus	12	7	13.0	31.3	16.7	75.0	0.6	1.3	0.4	0.1	3.8
Karima Christmas-Kelly	6	0	12.0	27.8	27.3	60.0	0.8	1.0	0.8	0.2	2.7
Bridget Carleton	4	0	2.8	50.0	50.0	0	0.3	0	0	0	0.8

== Awards and milestones ==
Recipient	Award/milestone	Date awarded	Reference
Odyssey Sims	WNBA All-Star Selection	July 15, 2019	
Sylvia Fowles	WNBA All-Star Selection	July 15, 2019	
Napheesa Collier	WNBA All-Star Replacement Selection	July 22, 2019	
Danielle Robinson	WNBA Community Assist Award - June	July 23, 2019	
Napheesa Collier	WNBA Rookie of the Month - July	August 1, 2019	
Napheesa Collier	WNBA Western Conference Player of the Week	August 26, 2019	
Napheesa Collier	Rookie of the Year	September 16, 2019	
Napheesa Collier	WNBA All-Rookie Team	September 16, 2019	
Cheryl Reeve	WNBA Basketball Executive of the Year Award	September 18, 2019	
