= Allie Quigley =

American basketball player (born 1986)

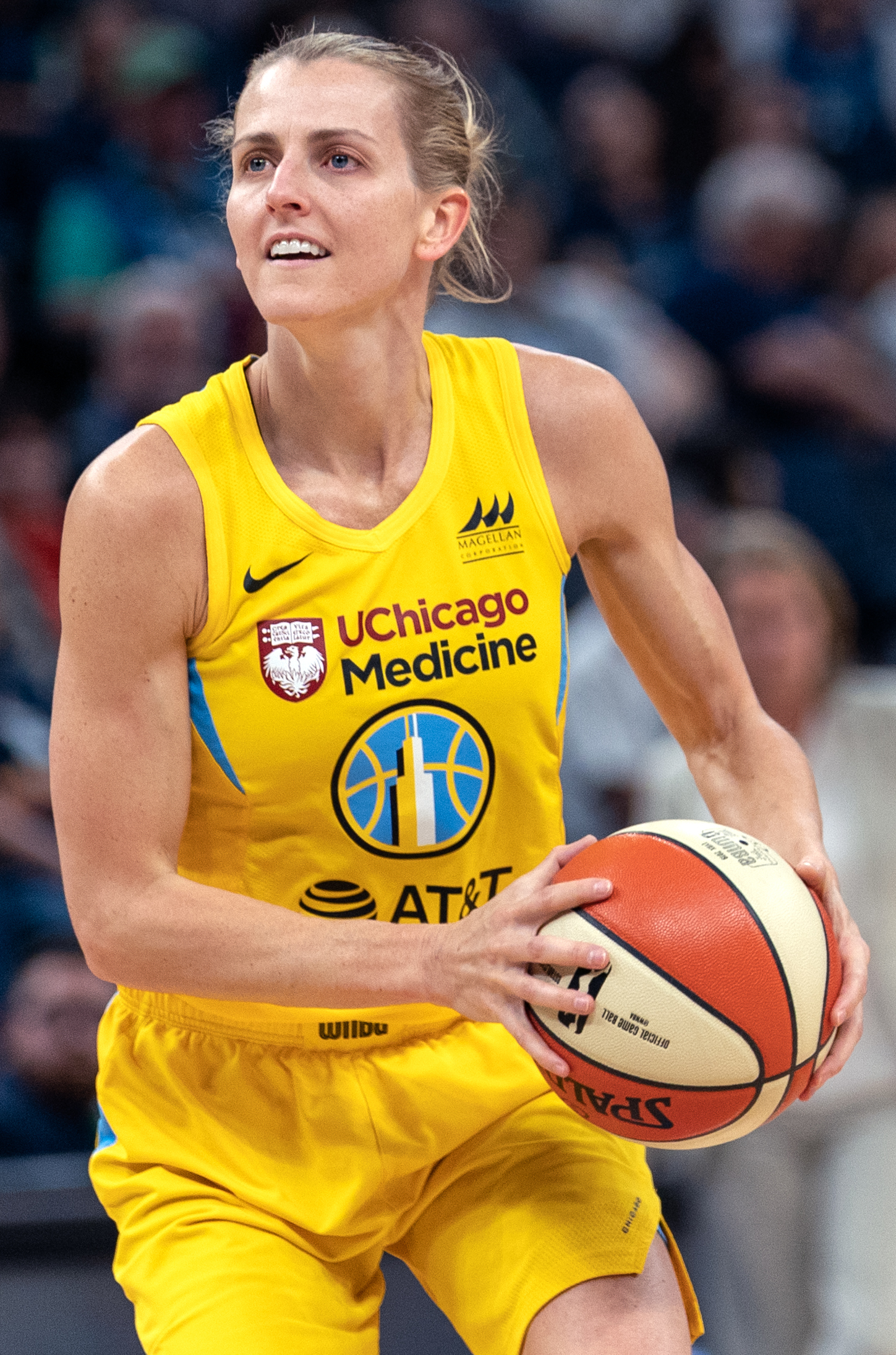
- Quigley with the Chicago Sky in 2019

Personal information
- Born: June 20, 1986 (age 40) Joliet, Illinois, U.S.
- Listed height: 5 ft 10 in (1.78 m)
- Listed weight: 140 lb (64 kg)

Career information
- High school: Joliet Catholic Academy (Joliet, Illinois)
- College: DePaul (2004–2008)
- WNBA draft: 2008: 2nd round, 22nd overall pick
- Drafted by: Seattle Storm
- Playing career: 2008–2022
- Position: Point guard / shooting guard

Career history
- 2008–2009: Phoenix Mercury
- 2008–2009: Mersin BŞB
- 2010: Indiana Fever
- 2010: San Antonio Silver Stars
- 2011: Seattle Storm
- 2013–2022: Chicago Sky
- 2015–2017: Fenerbahçe
- 2017–2018: Galatasaray
- 2018–2019: Famila Schio
- 2019–2022: UMMC Ekaterinburg

Career highlights
- WNBA champion (2021); 3× WNBA All-Star (2017–2019); 2× WNBA Sixth Woman of the Year (2014, 2015); 4× WNBA Three-Point Shootout champion (2017, 2018, 2021, 2022); No. 14 retired by Chicago Sky; EuroLeague championship (2021); Turkish Super League winner (2016); 2× Turkish Cup winner (2015, 2016); Turkish Cup MVP (2016); Turkish Super Cup winner (2015); Euro Cup Women winner (2018); First-team All-Big East (2008); CUSA Freshman of the Year (2005); CUSA All-Freshman Team (2005)
- Stats at WNBA.com
- Stats at Basketball Reference

Alexandria Quigley (born June 20, 1986) is an American former professional basketball player who played primarily for the Chicago Sky of the Women's National Basketball Association (WNBA).

Quigley played for DePaul University in Chicago. After graduating in 2008, Quigley was drafted by Seattle Storm with the 22nd overall pick in the 2008 WNBA draft. After five years playing for four teams in the WNBA, Quigley signed with the Chicago Sky in 2013. She was selected as the WNBA Sixth Woman of the Year Award in 2014 after helping the Sky reach the WNBA Finals for the first time, and won the award again in 2015. She was named a WNBA All-Star in 2017, 2018, and 2019. She won the All-Star Weekend Three-Point Contest in 2017, 2018, 2021, and 2022. She won a WNBA Championship in 2021 with the Sky. After sitting out the 2023 and 2024 seasons, Quigley announced her retirement in 2025, and her jersey number was retired by the Sky that year.

Quigley has also had an active career in European basketball leagues. In 2012, following her third straight year spent in Hungary, she obtained Hungarian citizenship and subsequently became a Hungarian international as well. As a member of the Fenerbahçe, she won the Turkish Super League in 2016 and the Turkish Cup in 2015 and 2016, being named the Turkish Cup MVP in the latter year.

She won the EuroLeague championship with Russian team UMMC Ekaterinburg in 2021. In February 2022, after the 2022 Russian invasion of Ukraine, she left UMMC Ekaterinburg.

== Early life ==
It was really important for [my mom] and my dad for us to go to a Catholic school. He was from a family of faith and all of them went to the same Catholic schools. I think it was just really special that we were able to still do that with the help of these [scholarships]. I think it's just something that I took for granted, and maybe I didn't even realize that we had help.

— Allie Quigley

Quigley was born in Joliet, Illinois on June 20, 1986. She has cited her father, who died when she was seven, as an inspiration for her playing basketball. She began following the WNBA when it debuted in 1997, and aspired to be a player in league.

In high school, she played for Joliet Catholic Academy where she was named a WBCA All-American. She participated in the 2004 WBCA High School All-America Game.

Quigley stated that she "from third grade even through college", as well as her sister and both of her brothers, had a scholarship-funded Catholic education. Quigley described that she had "so many great memories" she attributed to "the traits of a Catholic school, whether it's a smaller atmosphere or that it's more family-oriented". Quigley's matriculation to DePaul University was a continuance of this educational system for her.

== College career ==
Quigley attended DePaul University from 2004 to 2008, and played for the DePaul Blue Demons women's basketball team in all four years. The Blue Demons appeared in the NCAA Division I women's basketball tournament during all four seasons of Quigley's career, reaching the second round in 2005 and the sweet sixteen in 2006.

== Professional career ==
=== WNBA ===
==== Draft and early teams (2008–12) ====
Quigley was drafted by the Seattle Storm with the 22nd overall pick in the 2008 WNBA draft. She was cut by the Storm before the season started, and signed as a free agent with the Phoenix Mercury on May 11, 2008. She was a bench player for the Mercury, before being cut mid-season in 2009. Mercury star Diana Taurasi would later comment that Quigley made a strong impression on the team, saying "We saw it instantly. She could do things that no one else could do. Physically it was a little harder for her; it was early in her career. But she showed glimpses of what she could do on the court."

Quigley played for the San Antonio Stars and Indiana Fever in the 2010 season, and signed with the Seattle Storm in the 2011 season. During all three stints, she came off the bench, never averaging more than 7 minutes per game. She was cut by the Storm after the 2011 season, and did not play in the WNBA in the 2012 season. She has said that she wondered if her career in the WNBA was over, and spent the 2012 summer as a basketball camp counselor.

==== Chicago Sky (2013–22) ====
In March 2013, Quigley was signed by the Chicago Sky, returning to the city where she had played in her college career. Pokey Chatman, then-coach and general manager of the Sky, wanted to sign Quigley after watching her play in European leagues. In the 2013 season, she continued to be a bench player, averaging 9.4 minutes per game.

The 2014 season was a banner year for Quigley: she played a career-high 24.8 minutes per game, averaging 11.2 points. As a result, she was named the WNBA Sixth Woman of the Year. The Sky also had a successful year overall, appearing in their first WNBA Finals after defeating the Atlanta Dream and the Indiana Fever in the playoffs. However, they were swept by Phoenix Mercury in the Finals. Quigley averaged 25.7 minutes and 14.2 points per game in the playoffs.

On February 23, 2015, Quigley re-signed a multi-year contract with the Sky. That season, Quigley was once again named WNBA Sixth Woman of the Year. The Sky achieved a 21–13 record, but were defeated by the Indiana Fever in the conference finals.

In 2017, Quigley emerged as a starter for the Sky, and was named a WNBA All-Star for the first time in her career. She set career records with 32.3 minutes and 16.4 points per game. She was named an All-Star again in 2018, and won back-to-back Three-Point Contests in 2017 and 2018. Her score of 29 points in 2018 set an all-time record for the Three-Point Contest across both the NBA and the WNBA.

In February 2019, she signed a one-year contract extension with the Sky for $117,500, making her the team's highest-paid player for the 2019 season. That season, she started all 34 games for the first time, averaging 13.8 points per game and making a league-high 80 three-pointers. She was also selected to the All-Star Game for the third consecutive year.

In 2020, Quigley once again re-signed with the Sky. The 2020 season was delayed and shortened to 22 games in a bubble due to the COVID-19 pandemic. Quigley played and started in all 22 games, the Sky had finished 12–10 with the number 6 seed, but were eliminated by the Connecticut Sun in the first round elimination game.

Quigley played the Sky's 2021 season opener on May 15, before being sidelined for the rest of the month with a hamstring injury. She came off the bench for the Sky early in the season, but returned to the starting lineup after the mid-season Olympic break. During the Sky's playoff run, she was the team's second-leading scorer. She helped the Sky win the 2021 WNBA Finals, recording a team-high 26 points in the series-clinching Game 4. In the 2022 season, Quigley played and started in 34 of 36 games for the Sky, who earned the second-seed with a 26–10 record, but lost to the Connecticut Sun in the Semifinals.

In February 2023, Quigley announced that she would be sitting out the 2023 season, but was not officially retiring.

=== European leagues ===
In the 2008–09 season Quigley played for Turkey's Mersin in the Turkish Super League for the first time in her overseas career.

In 2009–10 Quigley returned to Europe, this time she played for Pécs 2010 of Hungary. She became Hungarian champion and Hungarian Cup winner, and played in the EuroLeague Women as well. In the 2011–12 season Quigley was still the player of Pécs 2010, though the team could not participate in the Euroleague due to financial issues, thus the team competed in the Hungarian Championship only. The team finished in the third place in the national championship. Quigley averaged 16.68 points in the regular season and 17.50 in the play-offs. At the end of the season Quigley obtained Hungarian citizenship and debuted in the Hungarian national team against Slovakia. She participated in further preparation matches and eventually earned a place in the Hungarian roster for the EuroBasket Women 2013 qualification.

On July 13, 2015, Fenerbahçe announced her transfer to the club.

In February 2022, after the 2022 Russian invasion of Ukraine, she left UMMC Ekaterinburg in the Russian Women's Basketball Premier League.

=== Retirement ===
In June 2025, Quigley officially announced her retirement from professional basketball. Her jersey number (14) was retired by the Chicago Sky at an in-game ceremony on July 9, 2025.

== Personal life ==
In December 2018, Quigley married her Chicago Sky teammate Courtney Vandersloot.

Quigley and Vandersloot's daughter, Jana, was born on April 8, 2025.

== Career statistics ==
Legend
GP	Games played	GS	Games started	MPG	Minutes per game	RPG	Rebounds per game
APG	Assists per game	SPG	Steals per game	BPG	Blocks per game	PPG	Points per game
TO	Turnovers per game	FG%	Field-goal percentage	3P%	3-point field-goal percentage	FT%	Free-throw percentage
**Bold**	Career best	°	League leader

=== WNBA ===
==== Regular season ====
WNBA regular season statistics
Year	Team	GP	GS	MPG	FG%	3P%	FT%	RPG	APG	SPG	BPG	TO	PPG
2008	Phoenix	14	0	7.1	.333	.182	.500	0.8	0.3	0.4	0.1	0.4	2.1
2009	Phoenix	6	0	5.3	.375	**.500**	**1.000**	0.8	0.2	0.0	0.0	0.8	1.7
2010	Indiana	3	0	6.0	.500	.000	**1.000**	0.3	0.3	0.7	0.3	1.0	2.0
2010	San Antonio	4	0	6.3	.500	**.500**	.667	0.3	0.0	0.0	0.0	**0.0**	3.5
2010	Total	7	0	6.1	.500	.500	.750	0.3	0.1	0.3	0.1	0.4	2.9
2011	Seattle	7	0	2.0	.200	.000	**1.000**	0.6	0.1	0.1	0.1	0.1	0.6
2013	Chicago	**34**	0	9.4	.316	.315	.889	0.7	0.6	0.4	0.1	0.6	3.8
2014	Chicago	**34**	1	24.8	.444	.387	.879	2.2	1.9	0.7	0.2	1.8	11.2
2015	Chicago	32	7	22.5	.431	.340	.826	1.8	1.7	0.4	**0.5**	1.4	11.1
2016	Chicago	**34**	0	17.8	.471	.366	.895	0.9	1.6	0.5	0.1	1.1	9.5
2017	Chicago	31	31	**32.3**	**.505**	.430	.893	**3.3**	**3.6**	**0.8**	**0.5**	2.4	**16.4**
2018	Chicago	32	32	29.7	.466	.420	.857	2.4	2.5	0.7	0.3	2.1	15.4
2019	Chicago	**34**	**34**	28.6	.493	.442	.870	3.0	2.5	**0.8**	0.2	1.4	13.8
2020	Chicago	22	22	28.7	.448	.346	.919	2.9	2.4	0.6	0.3	1.3	15.4
2021^{†}	Chicago	26	11	24.4	.448	.454	.959°	2.7	2.3	0.5	0.3	1.2	13.2
2022	Chicago	**34**	**34**	26.3	.428	.355	.950	2.5	2.9	0.7	0.2	1.3	11.4
**Career**	14 years, 5 teams	347	172	22.4	.452	.394	.893	2.0	2.0	0.6	0.3	1.3	10.9

==== Playoffs ====
WNBA playoff statistics
Year	Team	GP	GS	MPG	FG%	3P%	FT%	RPG	APG	SPG	BPG	TO	PPG
2011	Seattle	1	0	4.0	.000	.000	.000	0.0	0.0	0.0	0.0	**0.0**	0.0
2013	Chicago	2	0	12.5	.250	**.500**	.000	0.0	1.5	0.0	0.0	0.5	2.5
2014	Chicago	9	0	25.7	.412	.342	.897	2.7	2.1	0.3	**0.6**	2.6	14.2
2015	Chicago	3	0	27.0	**.590**	.438	**1.000**	2.3	2.7	0.0	0.0	1.3	**18.0**
2016	Chicago	5	0	13.2	.417	.300	**1.000**	1.0	1.4	0.2	0.0	0.6	5.6
2019	Chicago	2	2	28.5	.429	.125	**1.000**	**4.5**	**5.0**	**1.0**	0.5	1.5	10.5
2020	Chicago	1	1	28.0	.778	.333	**1.000**	0.0	0.0	0.0	0.0	1.0	19.0
2021^{†}	Chicago	**10**	**10**	**32.7**	.417	.365	**1.000**°	2.9	1.8	0.6	0.3	1.4	15.3
2022	Chicago	8	8	29.0	.338	.319	.714	3.1	3.1	**1.0**	0.3	1.3	9.6
**Career**	9 years, 2 teams	41	21	25.6	.422	.342	.911	2.4	2.2	0.5	0.3	1.4	11.8

=== College ===
NCAA statistics
Year	Team	GP	Points	FG%	3P%	FT%	RPG	APG	SPG	BPG	PPG
2004–05	DePaul	31	443	**.465**	**.457**	**.923**	2.6	3.1	1.8	0.3	14.3
2005–06	DePaul	**34**	509	.419	.357	.779	2.7	3.1	1.4	0.2	15.0
2006–07	DePaul	32	506	.400	.361	.806	5.0	3.1	1.5	0.3	15.8
2007–08	DePaul	32	**620**	.431	.363	.865	**5.1**	**3.9**	**1.9**	**0.4**	**19.4**
**Career**		129	2,078	.427	.386	.832	3.9	3.3	1.7	0.3	16.1

== See also ==
- List of WNBA career 3-point scoring leaders
