= 2019 Los Angeles Sparks season =

- Head coach: Derek Fisher
- Arena: Staples Center

Results
- Record: 28–6 (.824)
- Place: 1st (Western)
- Playoff finish: 3rd seed, Lost in Semifinals to Connecticut, 0-3

Media
- Television: Spectrum SportsNet; ESPN2, CBSSN, NBATV

The 2019 Los Angeles Sparks season was the 23rd season for the Los Angeles Sparks of the Women's National Basketball Association.

During the off-season, head coach Brian Agler resigned and accepted the head coach position with the Dallas Wings. On December 5, former NBA player Derek Fisher was announced as the new head coach.

The Sparks started the season with a 6-6 record in the first two months. Their good form continued into August, with the team going 8–4 and putting together a five game win streak. The turn around game mostly at home, with the Sparks posting a 9–0 home record during July and August. The team finished out the season with three straight wins at home. Their 22–12 overall record, secured them the third seed in the playoffs.

After earning a bye in the first round, the Sparks easily defeated the Seattle Storm at home, 92–69. This set up a semifinal matchup with the Connecticut Sun. The Sparks lost the first two road games in the series, and couldn't win the third game at home. The Sun swept the Sparks to end their season.

After the 2019 season, Penny Toler was dismissed as general manager. Her dismissal came among rumors that she entered the locker room after a playoff game and gave a "obscenity-laced speech that also included several racial epithets".

== Transactions ==
=== WNBA draft ===
Round	Pick	Player	Nationality	School/Team/Country
1	7	Kalani Brown	United States	Baylor
2	19	Marina Mabrey	United States	Notre Dame
3	31	Ángela Salvadores	Spain	Ensino (Spain)

=== Trades/Roster Changes ===
Date	Details
February 1, 2019	Re-signed G Karlie Samuelson
February 1, 2019	Re-signed G Odyssey Sims
February 6, 2019	Signed F Ashley Walker
February 11, 2019	Re-signed G/F Alana Beard
February 13, 2019	Signed G/F Tierra Ruffin-Pratt
February 20, 2019	Signed G Alina Iagupova
March 5, 2019	Signed C Rachel Hollivay
March 28, 2019	Signed G Loryn Goodwin
April 12, 2019	Signed G Gabby Green
April 22, 2019	Traded G Odyssey Sims to Minnesota in exchange for G Alexis Jones
April 27, 2019	Traded their first-round pick in the 2020 WNBA draft to Connecticut in exchange for F Chiney Ogwumike
April 30, 2019	Re-signed G Chelsea Gray
May 13, 2019	Claimed G Cierra Dillard off Waivers
May 13, 2019	Waived G Gabby Green and G Gabby Green
May 15, 2019	Re-signed G Riquna Williams
May 20, 2019	Traded C Jantel Lavender to Chicago in exchange for Chicago's second round pick in the 2020 WNBA draft

== Roster ==
2019 Los Angeles Sparks roster
Players
Coaches

Pos.	No.	Nat.	Name	Height	Weight	DOB	From	Yrs
G/F	0	(United States)	Beard, Alana	5' 11" (1.8m)	160 lb (73kg)	1982-05-14	Duke	13
C	21	(United States)	Brown, Kalani	6' 7" (2.01m)	245 lb (111kg)	1997-03-21	Baylor	R
G	12	(United States)	Gray, Chelsea	5' 11" (1.8m)	170 lb (77kg)	1992-10-08	Duke	4
G	1	(United States)	Jones, Alexis	5' 9" (1.75m)	173 lb (78kg)	1994-05-08	Baylor	2
G	5	(United States)	Mabrey, Marina	5' 11" (1.8m)	170 lb (77kg)	1996-09-14	Notre Dame	R
F	30	(United States)	Ogwumike, Nneka	6' 2" (1.88m)	174 lb (79kg)	1990-07-02	Stanford	7
F	13	(United States)	Ogwumike, Chiney	6' 4" (1.93m)	173 lb (78kg)	1992-05-22	Stanford	3
F/C	3	(United States)	Parker, Candace	6' 4" (1.93m)	175 lb (79kg)	1986-04-19	Tennessee	11
G	10	(United States)	Ruffin-Pratt, Tierra	5' 11" (1.8m)	180 lb (82kg)	1991-04-11	North Carolina	6
C	7	(Russia)	Vadeeva, Maria	6' 4" (1.93m)	185 lb (84kg)	1998-06-16	Russia	1
G	24	(United States)	Wiese, Sydney	6' 0" (1.83m)	165 lb (75kg)	1995-06-16	Oregon State	2
G	2	(United States)	Williams, Riquna	5' 7" (1.7m)	165 lb (75kg)	1990-05-28	Miami (FL)	6

Head coach
(United States) Derek Fisher (Little Rock)
Assistant coaches
(United States) Latricia Trammell (East Central)
(United States) Fred Williams (Boise State)
Athletic trainer
(United States) Courtney Watson (California)
Strength and conditioning coach
(United States) Kelly Dormandy (Springfield)

Legend

- (C) Team captain
- (DP) Unsigned draft pick
- (FA) Free agent
- (S) Suspended
- Injured

== Game log ==
=== Preseason ===
2019 pre-season game log
May: 1–1 (Home: 0–0; Road: 1–1)

Game	Date	Team	Score	High points	High rebounds	High assists	Location Attendance	Record
1	May 11	@ Phoenix Mercury	L 75–82	Walker (16)	Tied (7)	Jones (5)	Talking Stick Resort Arena; 3,751	0–1
2	May 17	Seattle Storm	W 92–85	N. Ogwumike (18)	N. Ogwumike (7)	Jones (6)	Hutto-Patterson Gym; N/A	1–1

2019 pre-season schedule

=== Regular season ===
2019 game log
Total: 22–12 (Home: 15–2; Road: 7–10)
May: 1–1 (Home: 1–0; Road: 0–1)

Game	Date	Team	Score	High points	High rebounds	High assists	Location Attendance	Record
1	May 26	@ Las Vegas Aces	L 70–83	Vadeeva (24)	N. Ogwumike (11)	3 tied (4)	Mandalay Bay Events Center; 7,249	0–1
2	May 31	Connecticut Sun	W 77–70	C. Ogwumike (20)	N. Ogwumike (15)	Tied (4)	Staples Center; 12,334	1–1

June : 5–5 (Home: 2–2; Road: 3–3)

Game	Date	Team	Score	High points	High rebounds	High assists	Location Attendance	Record
3	June 4	@ New York Liberty	W 78–73	Gray (29)	C. Ogwumike (10)	Gray (4)	Westchester County Center; 3,579	2–1
4	June 6	@ Connecticut Sun	L 77–89	N. Ogwumike (21)	N. Ogwumike (10)	Gray (6)	Mohegan Sun Arena; 5,496	2–2
5	June 8	@ Minnesota Lynx	W 89–85	Williams (25)	Tied (9)	Ruffin-Pratt (5)	Target Center; 8,834	3–2
6	June 14	@ Phoenix Mercury	W 85–65	Gray (21)	N. Ogwumike (8)	Gray (9)	Talking Stick Resort Arena; 10,381	4–2
7	June 15	New York Liberty	L 92–98	C. Ogwumike (26)	C. Ogwumike (14)	Gray (6)	Staples Center; 11,388	4–3
8	June 18	Washington Mystics	L 52–81	Tied (12)	Tied (7)	Parker (3)	Staples Center; 9,537	4–4
9	June 21	@ Seattle Storm	L 62–84	N. Ogwumike (10)	C. Ogwumike (6)	4 tied (2)	Angel of the Winds Arena; 6,114	4–5
10	June 23	@ Phoenix Mercury	L 72–82	Tied (12)	N. Ogwumike (13)	Gray (7)	Talking Stick Resort Arena; 10,132	4–6
11	June 27	Las Vegas Aces	W 86–74	3 tied (18)	C. Ogwumike (10)	Gray (6)	Staples Center; 10,295	5–6
12	June 30	Chicago Sky	W 94–69	Williams (19)	C. Ogwumike (7)	Tied (5)	Staples Center; 11,067	6–6

July : 5–2 (Home: 2–0; Road: 3–2)

Game	Date	Team	Score	High points	High rebounds	High assists	Location Attendance	Record
13	July 7	Washington Mystics	W 98–81	N. Ogwumike (31)	Tied (10)	Gray (13)	Staples Center; 10,336	7–6
14	July 9	@ Dallas Wings	L 62–74	N. Ogwumike (15)	Tied (10)	Gray (4)	College Park Center; 6,885	7–7
15	July 12	@ Indiana Fever	W 90–84	N. Ogwumike (22)	C. Ogwumike (9)	Gray (6)	Bankers Life Fieldhouse; 7,849	8–7
16	July 14	@ Atlanta Dream	W 76–71 (OT)	Williams (23)	N. Ogwumike (15)	Gray (9)	State Farm Arena; 5,083	9–7
17	July 18	Dallas Wings	W 69–64	N. Ogwumike (22)	Gray (9)	Gray (4)	Staples Center; 14,050	10–7
18	July 20	@ New York Liberty	L 78–83	N. Ogwumike (20)	N. Ogwumike (12)	Wiese (6)	Westchester County Center; 2,195	10–8
19	July 23	@ Atlanta Dream	W 78–66	N. Ogwumike (24)	C. Ogwumike (12)	Gray (6)	State Farm Arena; 7,047	11–8

August : 8–4 (Home: 7–0; Road: 1–4)

Game	Date	Team	Score	High points	High rebounds	High assists	Location Attendance	Record
20	August 1	Las Vegas Aces	W 76–68	N. Ogwumike (19)	N. Ogwumike (11)	Gray (10)	Staples Center; 11,692	12–8
21	August 4	Seattle Storm	W 83–75	Parker (21)	N. Ogwumike (10)	Gray (8)	Staples Center; 12,820	13–8
22	August 8	Phoenix Mercury	W 84–74	N. Ogwumike (24)	Parker (11)	Parker (6)	Staples Center; 10,345	14–8
23	August 11	Chicago Sky	W 84–81	Gray (26)	N. Ogwumike (12)	Gray (6)	Staples Center; 9,244	15–8
24	August 14	@ Dallas Wings	L 78–84	Gray (22)	N. Ogwumike (9)	Gray (7)	College Park Center; 5,004	15–9
25	August 16	@ Chicago Sky	L 81–91	Gray (25)	N. Ogwumike (7)	Tied (5)	Wintrust Arena; 7,907	15–10
26	August 20	Minnesota Lynx	W 81–71	Parker (20)	Parker (10)	N. Ogwumike (4)	Staples Center	16–10
27	August 22	Indiana Fever	W 98–65	N. Ogwumike (17)	Tied (7)	Parker (5)	Staples Center; 8,816	17–10
28	August 25	Connecticut Sun	W 84–72	Williams (21)	N. Ogwumike (8)	Gray (6)	Staples Center; 17,076	18–10
29	August 27	@ Washington Mystics	L 66–95	Tied (12)	Vadeeva (7)	Gray (7)	St. Elizabeth's East Arena; 4,200	18–11
30	August 29	@ Indiana Fever	W 87–83	Gray (30)	N. Ogwumike (8)	Gray (9)	Bankers Life Fieldhouse; 5,641	19–11
31	August 31	@ Las Vegas Aces	L 86–92	Williams (37)	N. Ogwumike (7)	Gray (7)	Mandalay Bay Events Center; 8,470	19–12

September : 3–0 (Home: 3–0; Road: 0–0)

Game	Date	Team	Score	High points	High rebounds	High assists	Location Attendance	Record
32	September 3	Atlanta Dream	W 70–60	Parker (21)	Parker (11)	Parker (6)	Staples Center; 9,889	20–12
33	September 5	Seattle Storm	W 102–68	Parker (20)	N. Ogwumike (10)	Gray (7)	Staples Center; 10,591	21–12
34	September 8	Minnesota Lynx	W 77–68	Williams (15)	Parker (7)	Gray (8)	Staples Center; 13,500	22–12

2019 season schedule

=== Playoffs ===
2019 playoff game log
Total: 1–3 (Home: 1–1; Road: 0–2)
Second Round: 1–0 (Home: 1–0; Road: 0–0)

Game	Date	Team	Score	High points	High rebounds	High assists	Location Attendance	Series
1	September 15	Seattle Storm	W 92–68	Gray (21)	Parker (10)	Gray (8)	Staples Center; 9,081	1–0

Semifinals: 0–3 (Home: 0–1; Road: 0–2)

Game	Date	Team	Score	High points	High rebounds	High assists	Location Attendance	Series
1	September 17	@ Connecticut Sun	L 75–84	Parker (24)	Tied (10)	Gray (4)	Mohegan Sun Arena; 7,102	0–1
2	September 19	@ Connecticut Sun	L 68–94	N. Ogwumike (18)	N. Ogwumike (7)	Gray (5)	Mohegan Sun Arena; 8,051	0–2
3	September 22	Connecticut Sun	L 56–78	N. Ogwumike (17)	N. Ogwumike (6)	Gray (4)	Walter Pyramid; 4,000	0–3

2019 playoff schedule

== Standings ==
#	Western Conference	W	L	PCT	GB	Home	Road	Conf.
1	Los Angeles Sparks (3)	22	12	.647	–	15–2	7–10	10–6
2	Las Vegas Aces (4)	21	13	.618	1	13–4	8–9	11–5
3	Seattle Storm (6)	18	16	.529	4	11–6	7–10	10–6
4	Minnesota Lynx (7)	18	16	.529	4	11–6	7–10	7–9
5	Phoenix Mercury (8)	15	19	.441	7	9–8	6–11	5–11
6	e – Dallas Wings	10	24	.294	12	8–9	2–15	5–11

== Playoffs ==
**First round** Single elimination (Sept. 11)
5	**Chicago Sky**	**105**
8	Phoenix Mercury	76
6	**Seattle Storm**	**84**
7	Minnesota Lynx	74

**Second round** Single elimination (Sept. 15)
4	**Las Vegas Aces**	**93**
5	Chicago Sky	92
3	**Los Angeles Sparks**	**92**
6	Seattle Storm	69

**Semifinals**; Best-of-5 (Sept. 17 – 24)
1	**Washington Mystics**	**3**
4	Las Vegas Aces	1
2	**Connecticut Sun**	**3**
3	Los Angeles Sparks	0

**WNBA Finals**; Best-of-5 (Sept. 29 – Oct. 10)
1	**Washington Mystics**	**3**
2	Connecticut Sun	2

Note: Teams re-seeded after each round.

- **Bold** – Game or series winner
- Italic – Team with home-court advantage

== Statistics ==
Legend
GP	Games played	GS	Games started	MPG	Minutes per game	RPG	Rebounds per game
APG	Assists per game	SPG	Steals per game	BPG	Blocks per game	PPG	Points per game
FG%	Field-goal percentage	3P%	3-point field-goal percentage	FT%	Free-throw percentage	TO	Turnovers per game
PF	Fouls per game		Team leader		League leader

=== Regular season ===
Player	GP	GS	MPG	FG%	3P%	FT%	RPG	APG	SPG	BPG	PPG
Nneka Ogwumike	32	32	27.9	51.0	33.8	82.8	8.8	1.8	1.9	0.5	16.1
Chelsea Gray	34	34	32.6	41.6	38.2	91.7	3.8	5.9	1.0	0.1	14.5
Riquna Williams	23	14	25.8	38.4	39.1	88.0	2.6	1.6	1.1	0.2	12.3
Candace Parker	22	22	26.0	42.2	46.7	79.1	6.4	3.5	1.0	0.8	11.2
Chiney Ogwumike	32	14	21.8	49.4	25.0	80.9	5.8	0.8	1.0	0.7	9.6
Maria Vadeeva	15	1	12.0	49.0	31.3	76.9	3.9	0.7	1.0	0.2	7.8
Tierra Ruffin-Pratt	34	33	25.2	36.7	34.2	85.4	2.4	1.7	0.8	0.6	6.0
Kalani Brown	28	0	13.5	47.8	0	78.3	3.5	0.6	0.3	0.8	5.4
Sydney Wiese	32	16	20.6	38.5	36.6	100	1.3	1.8	0.5	0.3	4.8
Alexis Jones	20	1	12.2	40.0	33.3	80.0	1.1	1.8	0.3	0.2	4.0
Marina Mabrey	31	0	11.5	34.4	27.3	87.5	1.2	1.0	0.6	0.2	4.0
Alana Beard	16	3	14.7	44.9	20.0	77.8	1.5	1.4	0.8	0.2	3.3

== Awards and honors ==
Recipient	Award	Date awarded	Ref.
Nneka Ogwumike	WNBA Western Conference Player of the Week	July 15, 2019	
Chelsea Gray	WNBA All-Star Selection	July 15, 2019	
Nneka Ogwumike	WNBA All-Star Selection	July 15, 2019	
Nneka Ogwumike	WNBA Western Conference Player of the Month - July	August 1, 2019	
Candace Parker	WNBA Western Conference Player of the Week	August 5, 2019	
Nneka Ogwumike	WNBA Western Conference Player of the Week	August 12, 2019	
Candace Parker	WNBA Western Conference Player of the Week	September 9, 2019	
Nneka Ogwumike	Kim Perrot Sportsmanship Award	September 16, 2019	
