= 2019 WNBA Finals =

Team	Coach	Wins
Washington Mystics	Mike Thibault	3
Connecticut Sun	Curt Miller	2
- Dates: September 29 – October 10
- MVP: Emma Meesseman
- Hall of Famers: Mystics: Elena Delle Donne (2026)
- Eastern finals: Washington Mystics defeated Las Vegas Aces 3–1 (Note: the semifinal rounds as of 2016 were not divided by conference)
- Western finals: Connecticut Sun defeated Los Angeles Sparks 3–0

The 2019 WNBA Finals, officially the WNBA Finals 2019 presented by YouTube TV for sponsorship reasons, was the best-of-five championship series for the 2019 season of the Women's National Basketball Association (WNBA). The Finals featured the top seeded Washington Mystics facing off against the second seed Connecticut Sun. The Mystics defeated the Sun through five games, with the Mystics winning the odd-numbered games and the Sun the even-numbered games. This was the first-ever Finals win for the Mystics, as well as the Sun's third Finals appearance.

== Road to the Finals ==
=== Standings ===
#	Eastern Conference	W	L	PCT	GB	Home	Road	Conf.
1	Washington Mystics **(1)**	26	8	.765	–	14–3	12–5	13–3
2	Connecticut Sun **(2)**	23	11	.676	3	15–2	8–9	11–5
3	Chicago Sky **(5)**	20	14	.588	6	12–5	8–9	11–5
4	**e** –Indiana Fever	13	21	.382	13	7–10	6–11	7–9
5	**e** –New York Liberty	10	24	.294	16	4–13	6–11	3–13
6	**e** –Atlanta Dream	8	26	.235	18	5–12	3–14	3–13

#	Western Conference	W	L	PCT	GB	Home	Road	Conf.
1	Los Angeles Sparks **(3)**	22	12	.647	–	15–2	7–10	10–6
2	Las Vegas Aces **(4)**	21	13	.618	1	13–4	8–9	11–5
3	Seattle Storm **(6)**	18	16	.529	4	11–6	7–10	10–6
4	Minnesota Lynx **(7)**	18	16	.529	4	11–6	7–10	7–9
5	Phoenix Mercury **(8)**	15	19	.441	7	9–8	6–11	5–11
6	**e** – Dallas Wings	10	24	.294	12	8–9	2–15	5–11

Notes

(#) – Conference Standing, Playoff Seeds shown to the right of team name
e – Eliminated from playoffs

=== Playoffs ===
**First round** Single elimination (Sept. 11)
5	**Chicago Sky**	**105**
8	Phoenix Mercury	76
6	**Seattle Storm**	**84**
7	Minnesota Lynx	74

**Second round** Single elimination (Sept. 15)
4	**Las Vegas Aces**	**93**
5	Chicago Sky	92
3	**Los Angeles Sparks**	**92**
6	Seattle Storm	69

**Semifinals**; Best-of-5 (Sept. 17 – 24)
1	**Washington Mystics**	**3**
4	Las Vegas Aces	1
2	**Connecticut Sun**	**3**
3	Los Angeles Sparks	0

**WNBA Finals**; Best-of-5 (Sept. 29 – Oct. 10)
1	**Washington Mystics**	**3**
2	Connecticut Sun	2

Note: Teams re-seeded after each round.

- **Bold** – Game or series winner
- Italic – Team with home-court advantage

== Summary ==
This finals was the third time in the four years since the WNBA switched playoff formats in 2016 that two teams from the same conference met in the WNBA Finals. In 2016 and 2017, two teams from the Western Conference met. This would be the first time two teams from the Eastern Conference met in the Finals. This Finals is also the third time that the top two seeds have made it to the finals since the WNBA switched playoff formats in 2016. The lone non-top two seed to make the finals was the third seeded Washington Mystics in 2018.

The Mystics' home court advantage figured to play a critical role in these finals. The Mystics had a 14–3 home record during the regular season and the Connecticut Sun had a 15–2 regular season home record. However, the Mystics had a regular season away record advantage 12–5 vs. 8–9. The Sun won the regular season series 2–1, with the home team winning each game.

=== Game 1 ===
Ariel Atkins turned around her recent poor form to lead the Mystics to a win in Game 1 of the Finals. Atkins was 5–21 during the Mystic's semifinal series, but scored 21 points in Game 1 of the Finals on 6–7 shooting. Additionally, Elena Delle Donne and Emma Meesseman played for the Mystics. This was a change from the regular season series, where both players did not play. Delle Donne in particular made her presence felt, leading the Mystics with twenty-two points and ten rebounds. The Sun got a big performance from Courtney Williams, who scored a game high twenty-six points. However, the Sun's bench contributed only eight total points, while the Mystic's bench scored sixteen.

ESPN, TSN5

September 29
3:00pm ET

Box Score

Connecticut Sun 86, Washington Mystics 95
Scoring by quarter: 17–30, 29–25, 20–21, 20–19
Pts: Courtney Williams (26); Rebs: Alyssa Thomas / Jonquel Jones (6); Asts: Alyssa Thomas (6)	Pts: Elena Delle Donne (22); Rebs: Elena Delle Donne (10); Asts: Natasha Cloud (7)
Washington lead series, 1-0

St. Elizabeth's East Arena
Attendance: 4,200
Referees: Roy Gulbeyan
Byron Jarrett
Tim Greene
Cheryl Flores

=== Game 2 ===
Elena Delle Donne only played 3:20 of the first quarter before experiencing back spasms that saw her miss the remainder of the game. The Sun took advantage of the League MVP's absence and won Game Two by twelve points. The Sun were led by Jonquel Jones who achieved the WNBA Finals' first ever thirty point and fifteen rebound game. Jones finished with thirty-two points and eighteen rebounds. The Mystics were able to tie the score at seventy-six, with eight minutes remaining, but Jones re-entered the game after sitting on the bench with four fouls. She returned to the game and helped the Sun finish off the win. With the series tied at one game apiece, the series heads to Connecticut for the next two games. The Sun now have home court advantage in the series.

ESPN, TSN2

October 1
8:00pm ET

Box Score

Connecticut Sun 99, Washington Mystics 87
Scoring by quarter: 29–17, 27–29, 17–23, 26–18
Pts: Jonquel Jones (32); Rebs: Jonquel Jones (18); Asts: Alyssa Thomas / Courtney Williams (6)	Pts: Emma Meesseman (27); Rebs: Emma Meesseman (8); Asts: Kristi Toliver (7)
Series tied, 1-1

St. Elizabeth's East Arena
Attendance: 4,200
Referees: Michael Price
Maj Forsberg
Tim Greene
Billy Smith

=== Game 3 ===
Elena Delle Donne played through her herniated disk and contributed 13 points in the Mystics road win. Washington got out to a hot start, going up fifteen points in the first quarter. They then took a five-point lead into halftime and never looked back, winning by thirteen points. Their road win brings them within one game of the WNBA Championship. The Mystics had four players score in double figures, with two reaching over twenty points. The Sun also had four players score in double figures, but none reached the twenty point mark.

ABC, SN360

October 6
3:30pm ET

Box Score

Washington Mystics 94, Connecticut Sun 81
Scoring by quarter: 32–17, 11–22, 25–18, 26–24
Pts: Emma Meesseman (21); Rebs: Aerial Powers (8); Asts: Kristi Toliver (10)	Pts: Shekinna Stricklen / Jasmine Thomas (16); Rebs: Jonquel Jones (9); Asts: Alyssa Thomas (9)
Washington lead series, 2-1

Mohegan Sun Arena
Attendance: 9,160
Referees: Eric Brewton
Roy Gulbeyan
Tiffany Bird

=== Game 4 ===
The Sun stormed out to a fifteen-point lead in the first quarter and held off a late Mystics charge to win Game 4, and force a deciding Game 5. The Mystics made a run after halftime, winning the third quarter by sixteen points, and tying the game going into the fourth quarter, but it was not enough to overcome the Sun. Alyssa Thomas starred for the Sun, coming within two rebounds of the first WNBA Finals triple double. Jonquel Jones also recorded a double double for the Sun. The Mystics led by five at one point in the fourth, but the Sun hit two three pointers to gain the lead for good with 2:22 left. Connecticut went four for four on free throws in the last minute to seal the game.

ESPN2, TSN4/5

October 8
8:00pm ET

Box Score

Washington Mystics 86, Connecticut Sun 90
Scoring by quarter: 17–32, 23–24, 28–12, 18–22
Pts: Aerial Powers (15); Rebs: Natasha Cloud (7); Asts: Natasha Cloud (9)	Pts: Jonquel Jones (18); Rebs: Jonquel Jones (13); Asts: Alyssa Thomas (11)
Series tied, 2-2

Mohegan Sun Arena
Attendance: 8,458
Referees: Michael Price
Maj Forsberg
Byron Jarrett

=== Game 5 ===
Game five was a tight affair in the first half, with the Sun taking a one-point lead into half time. The game continued to be close in the third quarter. The Sun took a two-point lead into the final period. However, season MVP Elena Delle Donne scored four of her twenty-one points during an 8–0 run with three minutes left to seal the win for the Mystics. The Mystics won the fourth quarter by thirteen points, and the game by eleven. The win secured the Mystic's their first title in franchise history, and leaves the Sun still looking for their franchise's first title. Emma Meesseman lead the Mystics in scoring, with twenty two points. She was named the Finals MVP and became the first bench player to win the award. Jonquel Jones led the Sun with twenty-five points and Alyssa Thomas had twenty-one points and twelve rebounds, but it was not enough to overcome the Mystics.

ESPN2, TSN4

October 10
8:00pm ET

Box Score

Connecticut Sun 78, Washington Mystics 89
Scoring by quarter: 20–23, 23–19, 21–20, 14–27
Pts: Jonquel Jones (25); Rebs: Alyssa Thomas (12); Asts: Alyssa Thomas / Jasmine Thomas (6)	Pts: Emma Meesseman (22); Rebs: Elena Delle Donne (9); Asts: Kristi Toliver (4)
Washington wins WNBA Finals, 3-2

St. Elizabeth's East Arena
Attendance: 4,200
Referees: Eric Brewton
Roy Gulbeyan
Maj Forsberg

== Team rosters ==
2019 Washington Mystics roster
Players
Coaches

Pos.	No.	Nat.	Name	Height	Weight	DOB	From	Yrs
G	7	(United States)	Atkins, Ariel	5' 11" (1.8m)	167 lb (76kg)	1996-07-30	Texas	1
G	15	(United States)	Cloud, Natasha	5' 9" (1.75m)	160 lb (73kg)	1992-02-22	Saint Joseph's	4
G/F	11	(United States)	Delle Donne, Elena	6' 5" (1.96m)	187 lb (85kg)	1989-09-05	Delaware	6
F	21	(United States)	Hawkins, Tianna	6' 3" (1.91m)	186 lb (84kg)	1991-03-02	Maryland	5
F	2	(United States)	Hines-Allen, Myisha	6' 2" (1.88m)	200 lb (91kg)	1996-05-30	Louisville	1
G	5	(United States)	Leslie, Kiara	6' 0" (1.83m)	175 lb (79kg)	1995-12-06	NC State	R
F	33	(Belgium)	Meesseman, Emma	6' 4" (1.93m)	191 lb (87kg)	1993-05-13	Belgium	5
G	6	(Belgium)	Mestdagh, Kim	5' 9" (1.75m)	154 lb (70kg)	1990-03-12	Colorado State	R
G/F	23	(United States)	Powers, Aerial	5' 9" (1.75m)	159 lb (72kg)	1994-07-17	Michigan State	3
F/C	30	(United States)	Sanders, LaToya	6' 2" (1.88m)	170 lb (77kg)	1986-09-11	North Carolina	6
G	20	(United States)	Toliver, Kristi	5' 7" (1.7m)	130 lb (59kg)	1987-01-27	Maryland	10
G	32	(United States)	Walker-Kimbrough, Shatori	5' 9" (1.75m)	140 lb (64kg)	1995-05-18	Maryland	2

Head coach
(United States) Mike Thibault (Saint Martin's)
Assistant coaches
(United States) Marianne Stanley (Immaculata)
(United States) Eric Thibault (Missouri)
Athletic trainer
(United States) Chalisa Fonza (Western Illinois)

Legend

- (C) Team captain
- (DP) Unsigned draft pick
- (FA) Free agent
- (S) Suspended
- Injured

2019 Connecticut Sun roster
Players
Coaches

Pos.	No.	Nat.	Name	Height	Weight	DOB	From	Yrs
G	1	(United States)	Banham, Rachel	5' 9" (1.75m)	168 lb (76kg)	1993-07-15	Minnesota	3
G	23	(United States)	Clarendon, Layshia	5' 9" (1.75m)	158 lb (72kg)	1991-05-02	California	6
G	2	(United States)	Hiedeman, Natisha	5' 7" (1.7m)	125 lb (57kg)	1997-02-10	Marquette	R
G	32	(United States)	Holmes, Bria	6' 1" (1.85m)	170 lb (77kg)	1994-04-19	West Virginia	2
F/C	35	(The Bahamas)	Jones, Jonquel	6' 6" (1.98m)	190 lb (86kg)	1994-01-05	George Washington	3
F	42	(United States)	Jones, Brionna	6' 3" (1.91m)	230 lb (104kg)	1995-12-18	Maryland	2
F/C	55	(United States)	Plaisance, Theresa	6' 5" (1.96m)	200 lb (91kg)	1992-05-18	LSU	5
G/F	40	(United States)	Stricklen, Shekinna	6' 2" (1.88m)	178 lb (81kg)	1990-07-30	Tennessee	7
F	25	(United States)	Thomas, Alyssa	6' 2" (1.88m)	185 lb (84kg)	1992-04-12	Maryland	5
G	5	(United States)	Thomas, Jasmine	5' 9" (1.75m)	145 lb (66kg)	1989-09-30	Duke	8
F	33	(United States)	Tuck, Morgan	6' 2" (1.88m)	200 lb (91kg)	1994-04-30	Connecticut	3
G	10	(United States)	Williams, Courtney	5' 8" (1.73m)	136 lb (62kg)	1994-05-11	South Florida	3

Head coach
(United States) Curt Miller (Baldwin Wallace)
Assistant coaches
(United States) Brandi Poole
(United States) Chris Koclanes

Legend

- (C) Team captain
- (DP) Unsigned draft pick
- (FA) Free agent
- (S) Suspended
- Injured
