= 2019 Chicago Sky season =

Women's North American basketball season

- Head coach: James Wade
- Arena: Wintrust Arena

Results
- Record: 20–14 (.588)
- Place: 3rd (Eastern)
- Playoff finish: 5th Seed; Lost in 2nd Round to Las Vegas

Media
- Television: WMEU-CD (The U Too); ESPN; ESPN2; NBA TV

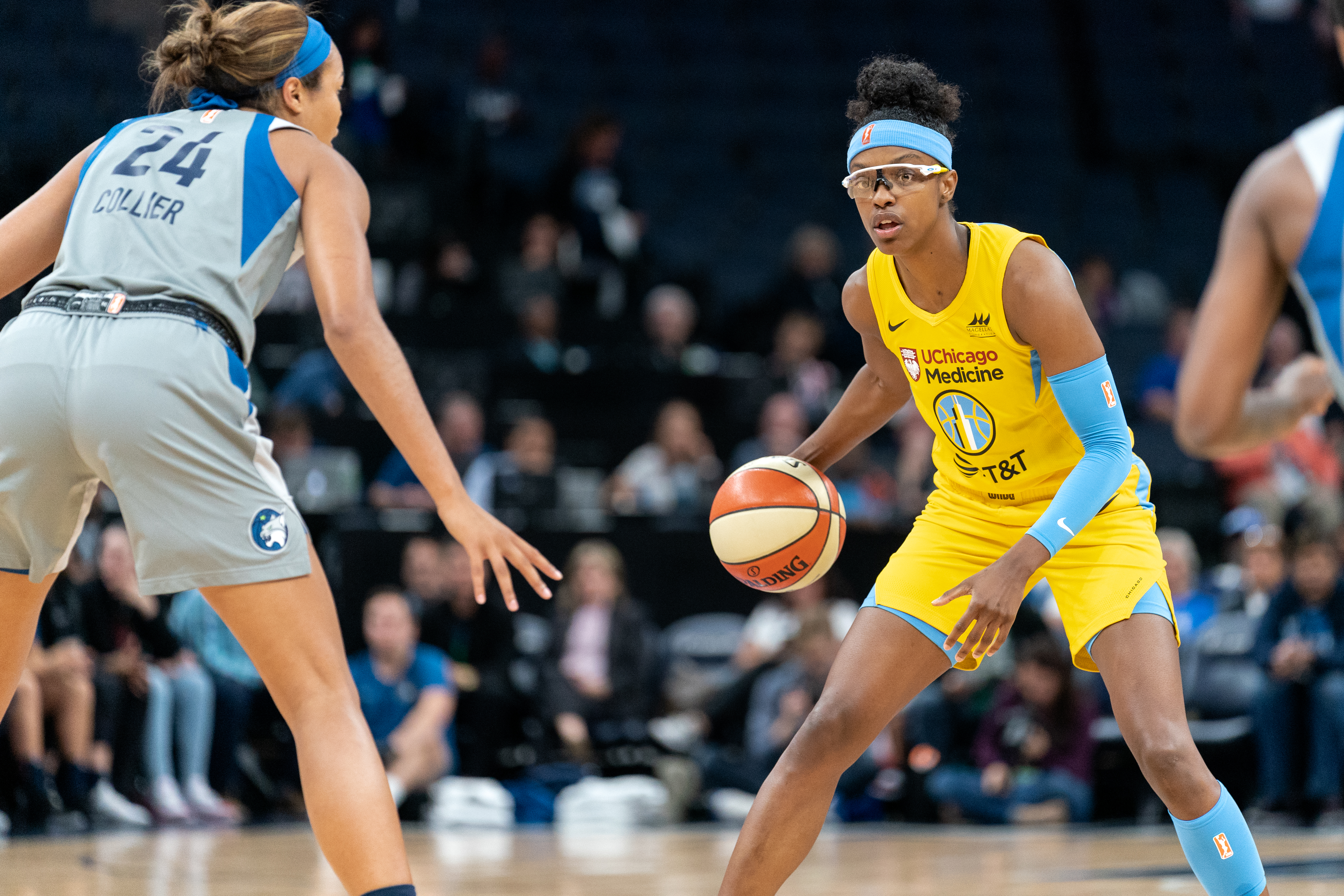
Chicago Sky player Diamond DeShields in a game against the Minnesota Lynx.

The 2019 Chicago Sky season was the franchise's 14th season in the Women's National Basketball Association (WNBA). The regular season tipped off on May 25 and concluded on September 8. On August 22, the team clinched a playoff berth for the first time in three seasons.

During the offseason, Amber Stocks was dismissed by the team as general manager and head coach. In November, James Wade was announced as the team's new head coach. Wade was previously an assistant with UMMC Ekaterinburg and the Minnesota Lynx.

Three Sky players, all guards, were named as reserves to the 2019 WNBA All-Star Game: veterans Allie Quigley and Courtney Vandersloot, and second-year player Diamond DeShields. The Sky finished the season second in points per game, but second-to-last in points allowed. DeShields was the team's leading scorer with 16.2 points per game, and Vandersloot broke her own all-time record with 9.1 assists per game. Vandersloot and DeShields were named to the first and second All-WNBA Teams respectively.

In the first round of the 2019 WNBA Playoffs, fifth-seeded Sky hosted the eighth-seeded Phoenix Mercury, whom they defeated 105–76 in a single-elimination game. They lost their second-round single-elimination game on the road to the Las Vegas Aces by a score of 93–92 in the final seconds.

== Transactions ==
=== WNBA draft ===
The Sky made the following selections in the 2019 WNBA draft:

| Round | Pick | Player | Nationality | School/Team/Country |
|---|---|---|---|---|
| 1 | 4 | Katie Lou Samuelson | United States | Connecticut Huskies |
| 2 | 15 | Chloe Jackson | United States | Baylor Lady Bears |
| 3 | 27 | María Conde | Spain | Wisła Can-Pack Kraków (Poland) |

=== Trades and Roster Changes ===
| Date | Trade |
|---|---|
| February 1, 2018 | Re-signed F Cheyenne Parker |
| February 2, 2019 | Re-Signed G Allie Quigley |
| February 14, 2019 | Signed F Evelyn Akhator to Training Camp Contract |
| February 14, 2019 | Re-Signed G Jamierra Faulkner |
| February 18, 2019 | Re-Signed G Linnae Harper |
| February 19, 2019 | Signed C Victoria Macaulay to Training Camp Contract |
| February 27, 2019 | Re-Sign C Astou Ndour |
| March 19, 2019 | Signed G Hind Ben Abdelkader |
| April 30, 2019 | Signed F Leslie Robinson to Training Camp Contract |
| May 7, 2019 | Waived F Leslie Robinson and F Pallas Kunaiyi-Akpanah |
| May 20, 2019 | Traded their second round pick in the 2020 WNBA draft to Los Angeles in exchange for C Jantel Lavender |
| May 21, 2019 | Traded C Alaina Coates to Minnesota in exchange for Minnesota's third round pick in the 2020 WNBA draft |
| August 22, 2019 | Waived G Chloe Jackson and signed C Kayla Alexander |

=== Additions ===
| Player | Date | Former Team |
|---|---|---|
| Jantel Lavender | May 20, 2019 | Los Angeles Sparks |
| Kayla Alexander | August 22, 2019 | Free agent |

=== Subtractions ===
| Player | Date | New Team |
|---|---|---|
| Alaina Coates | May 21, 2019 | Minnesota Lynx |
| Chloe Jackson | August 22, 2019 | Free agent |

== Roster ==
2019 Chicago Sky roster
Players
Coaches

| Pos. | No. | Nat. | Name | Height | Weight | DOB | From | Yrs |
|---|---|---|---|---|---|---|---|---|
| C | 40 | (United States) | Alexander, Kayla | 6' 4" (1.93m) | 195 lb (88kg) | January 5, 1991 | Syracuse | 6 |
| G/F | 2 | (United States) | Copper, Kahleah | 6' 1" (1.85m) | 155 lb (70kg) | August 28, 1994 | Rutgers | 3 |
| G | 1 | (United States) | DeShields, Diamond | 6' 1" (1.85m) | 163 lb (74kg) | March 5, 1995 | Tennessee | 1 |
| C | 31 | (United States) | Dolson, Stefanie | 6' 5" (1.96m) | 231 lb (105kg) | January 8, 1992 | Connecticut | 5 |
| G | 21 | (United States) | Faulkner, Jamierra | 5' 6" (1.68m) | 138 lb (63kg) | March 9, 1992 | Southern Miss | 4 |
| F/C | 7 | (United States) | Lavender, Jantel | 6' 4" (1.93m) | 185 lb (84kg) | November 12, 1988 | Ohio State | 8 |
| C | 45 | (Spain) | Ndour, Astou | 6' 5" (1.96m) | 150 lb (68kg) | August 22, 1994 | Spain | 3 |
| F | 32 | (United States) | Parker, Cheyenne | 6' 4" (1.93m) | 193 lb (88kg) | August 22, 1992 | Middle Tennessee | 4 |
| G | 14 | (United States) | Quigley, Allie | 5' 10" (1.78m) | 140 lb (64kg) | June 20, 1986 | DePaul | 10 |
| G | 33 | (United States) | Samuelson, Katie Lou | 6' 3" (1.91m) | 169 lb (77kg) | June 13, 1997 | Connecticut | R |
| G | 22 | (United States) | Vandersloot, Courtney | 5' 8" (1.73m) | 145 lb (66kg) | February 8, 1989 | Gonzaga | 8 |
| F | 15 | (United States) | Williams, Gabby | 5' 11" (1.8m) | 172 lb (78kg) | September 9, 1996 | Connecticut | 1 |

Head coach
(United States) James Wade (Kennesaw State)
Assistant coaches
(United States) Carla Morrow (Tulsa)
(United States) Bridget Pettis (Florida)
Player development
(United States) Emre Vatansever
Athletic trainer
(United States) Meghan Lockerby
Strength and conditioning coach
(United States) Ann Crosby (Western Michigan)

Legend

- (C) Team captain
- (DP) Unsigned draft pick
- (FA) Free agent
- (S) Suspended
- Injured

== Season overview ==
Prior to the start of the season, new head coach James Wade prioritized improving defense as a key goal for the Sky this season. In the previous season, the Sky had recorded the league's worst defensive rating.

The Sky lost their opening game against the Lynx on May 25, 2019, but won their home opener a week later against the Storm. After a road loss to the Mystics, the Sky proceeded to win four straight games. After a home loss to the Fever, the Sky faced the league-leading Sun, and surprised their opponents with a blowout 93–75 win. With a loss at home to the Mystics on June 26, Chicago held a 6–4 record ten games into the season.

On a three-game road trip from June 28 to July 2, the Sky lost three games against the Storm, Sparks, and Aces, dropping to a 6–7 record. The Sky won 5 out of their next 6 games, however, and improved to an 11–8 record before the All-Star break. The only game they lost during this period was a July 10 home game against the Lynx, which they lost by one point. The stretch also included a one-point win against the Dream on July 17.

Three Sky players—Diamond DeShields, Allie Quigley, and Courtney Vandersloot—were named as reserves in the 2019 WNBA All-Star Game on July 27. Most of the team (all but three players) made the trip to Las Vegas for All-Star Weekend to support their teammates. DeShields won the Skills Challenge during All-Star Weekend, but Quigley failed to repeat as Three-Point Contest champion.

On July 30, on a road trip to face the league-leading Sun, the Sky faced problems with canceled and delayed flights and did not arrive in their hotel until 4:45am on the day of the game. (Note: The WNBA's collective bargaining agreement requires players to fly on commercial flights, rather than chartered private flights. As such, they are subject to cancellations and delays on commercial airlines.) They rebounded with a win in their next road game against the Dream and improved to a 12–9 record.

During a 101–92 comeback victory against the New York Liberty on August 7, the Chicago Sky scored 42 points in the fourth quarter, the highest of any WNBA team since the league moved to a four-quarter format in 2006. Allie Quigley scored 22 points in the game, and Jantel Lavender double-doubled with 20 points and 10 rebounds. With this win, the Sky matched their previous season's win total of 13.

Over their next four games, the Sky faced the two teams directly above them in the standings—the Las Vegas Aces and the Los Angeles Sparks—twice each. They split the series evenly with both teams, achieving a 15–11 record. Their home game against the Aces was marked by officiating controversies and a conflict between Liz Cambage and Cheyenne Parker, which resulted in technical fouls for both players.

In their remaining five games in August, the Sky went 3–2, for an overall record of 18–13. This stretch included both a convincing home 85–78 win over the top-seeded Washington Mystics and a surprise home loss to the low-seeded Dallas Wings. In September, the Sky scored 100 points in two straight games with wins over the playoff-bound Phoenix Mercury and Connecticut Sun, before losing their last regular season game on the road to the Mystics. Finishing the season with a 20–14 record, they finished the season as the fifth-seeded team.

== Game log ==
2019 pre-season game log
May: 0–2 (Home: 0–1; Road: 0–1)

| Game | Date | Team | Score | High points | High rebounds | High assists | Location Attendance | Record |
|---|---|---|---|---|---|---|---|---|
| 1 | May 14 | Indiana Fever | L 58–69 | Parker (11) | Samuelson (7) | Vandersloot (6) | Wintrust Arena; 4,033 | 0–1 |
| 2 | May 16 | @ Indiana Fever | L 65–76 | Parker (16) | Samuelson (6) | Jackson (5) | Bankers Life Fieldhouse; 3,794 | 0–2 |

2019 pre-season schedule

=== Regular season ===
2019 game log
Total: 20–14 (Home: 12–5; Road: 8–9)
May: 0–1 (Home: 0–0; Road: 0–1)

| Game | Date | Team | Score | High points | High rebounds | High assists | Location Attendance | Record |
|---|---|---|---|---|---|---|---|---|
| 1 | May 25 | @ Minnesota Lynx | L 71–89 | Tied (11) | Dolson (7) | Vandersloot (8) | Target Center; 8,524 | 0–1 |

June : 6–5 (Home: 4–2; Road: 2–3)

| Game | Date | Team | Score | High points | High rebounds | High assists | Location Attendance | Record |
|---|---|---|---|---|---|---|---|---|
| 2 | June 1 | Seattle Storm | W 83–79 | Quigley (25) | Vandersloot (8) | Vandersloot (11) | Wintrust Arena; 7,063 | 1–1 |
| 3 | June 5 | @ Washington Mystics | L 85–103 | DeShields (24) | 4 tied (5) | Vandersloot (8) | St. Elizabeth's East Arena; 2,347 | 1–2 |
| 4 | June 9 | Seattle Storm | W 78–71 | Parker (18) | Parker (11) | Vandersloot (7) | Wintrust Arena; 5,032 | 2–2 |
| 5 | June 11 | Phoenix Mercury | W 82–75 | DeShields (25) | Parker (10) | Vandersloot (8) | Wintrust Arena; 4,212 | 3–2 |
| 6 | June 15 | @ Indiana Fever | W 70–64 | Quigley (18) | Parker (10) | Vandersloot (8) | Bankers Life Fieldhouse; 4,715 | 4–2 |
| 7 | June 19 | @ New York Liberty | W 91–83 | Vandersloot (25) | Tied (8) | Vandersloot (6) | Westchester County Center; 1,585 | 5–2 |
| 8 | June 21 | Indiana Fever | L 69–76 | DeShields (19) | Lavender (7) | Vandersloot (8) | Wintrust Arena; 4,945 | 5–3 |
| 9 | June 23 | Connecticut Sun | W 93–75 | Parker (22) | Lavender (13) | Vandersloot (7) | Wintrust Arena; 5,607 | 6–3 |
| 10 | June 26 | Washington Mystics | L 74–81 | Quigley (21) | DeShields (9) | Vandersloot (8) | Wintrust Arena; 8,914 | 6–4 |
| 11 | June 28 | @ Seattle Storm | L 76–79 | DeShields (19) | Lavender (10) | Vandersloot (6) | Alaska Airlines Arena; 7,915 | 6–5 |
| 12 | June 30 | @ Los Angeles Sparks | L 69–94 | DeShields (23) | Parker (11) | Vandersloot (7) | Staples Center; 11,067 | 6–6 |

July : 5–3 (Home: 4–1; Road: 1–2)

| Game | Date | Team | Score | High points | High rebounds | High assists | Location Attendance | Record |
|---|---|---|---|---|---|---|---|---|
| 13 | July 2 | @ Las Vegas Aces | L 82–90 | Quigley (18) | 3 tied (6) | Vandersloot (12) | Mandalay Bay Events Center; 3,516 | 6–7 |
| 14 | July 7 | Dallas Wings | W 78–66 | Lavender (20) | Lavender (10) | Vandersloot (11) | Wintrust Arena; 6,102 | 7–7 |
| 15 | July 10 | Minnesota Lynx | L 72–73 | Quigley (24) | DeShields (9) | Williams (5) | Wintrust Arena; 8,508 | 7–8 |
| 16 | July 12 | New York Liberty | W 99–83 | Tied (17) | Dolson (9) | Vandersloot (12) | Wintrust Arena; 7,221 | 8–8 |
| 17 | July 14 | @ Dallas Wings | W 89–79 | DeShields (26) | Tied (7) | Vandersloot (8) | College Park Center; 4,261 | 9–8 |
| 18 | July 17 | Atlanta Dream | W 77–76 | DeShields (22) | Parker (10) | Vandersloot (9) | Wintrust Arena; 10,143 | 10–8 |
| 29 | July 21 | Indiana Fever | W 78–70 | Tied (19) | Lavender (11) | Vandersloot (14) | Wintrust Arena; 6,614 | 11–8 |
| 20 | July 30 | @ Connecticut Sun | L 94–100 | Quigley (24) | Dolson (10) | Vandersloot (11) | Mohegan Sun Arena; 6,358 | 11–9 |

August : 7–4 (Home: 3–2; Road: 4–2)

| Game | Date | Team | Score | High points | High rebounds | High assists | Location Attendance | Record |
|---|---|---|---|---|---|---|---|---|
| 21 | August 3 | @ Atlanta Dream | W 87–75 | Dolson (16) | DeShields (12) | Vandersloot (9) | State Farm Arena; 5,427 | 12–9 |
| 22 | August 7 | New York Liberty | W 101–92 | Quigley (22) | Lavender (10) | Vandersloot (8) | Wintrust Arena; 5,797 | 13–9 |
| 23 | August 9 | @ Las Vegas Aces | W 87–84 | 3 tied (16) | DeShields (7) | Vandersloot (13) | Mandalay Bay Events Center; 4,200 | 14–9 |
| 24 | August 11 | @ Los Angeles Sparks | L 81–84 | Quigley (20) | Tied (7) | Williams (6) | Staples Center; 9,244 | 14–10 |
| 25 | August 16 | Los Angeles Sparks | W 91–81 | Quigley (26) | Ndour (9) | Vandersloot (9) | Wintrust Arena; 7,907 | 15–10 |
| 26 | August 18 | Las Vegas Aces | L 85–100 | DeShields (28) | Ndour (10) | Vandersloot (9) | Wintrust Arena; 6,072 | 15–11 |
| 27 | August 20 | @Atlanta Dream | W 87–83 | DeShields (17) | Ndour (10) | Vandersloot (10) | State Farm Arena; 4,662 | 16–11 |
| 28 | August 23 | Washington Mystics | W 85–78 | DeShields (22) | Vandersloot (8) | Vandersloot (9) | Wintrust Arena; 6,131 | 17–11 |
| 29 | August 25 | @ Phoenix Mercury | W 94–86 | Quigley (24) | Parker (12) | Vandersloot (13) | Talking Stick Resort Arena; 12,054 | 18–11 |
| 30 | August 27 | @ Minnesota Lynx | L 85–93 | Parker (22) | Parker (8) | Vandersloot (10) | Target Center; 8,092 | 18–12 |
| 31 | August 29 | Dallas Wings | L 83–88 | Vandersloot (19) | Dolson (11) | Vandersloot (7) | Wintrust Arena; 5,614 | 18–13 |

September : 2–1 (Home: 1–0; Road: 1–1)

| Game | Date | Team | Score | High points | High rebounds | High assists | Location Attendance | Record |
|---|---|---|---|---|---|---|---|---|
| 32 | September 1 | Phoenix Mercury | W 105–78 | Tied (18) | Parker (8) | Vandersloot (13) | Wintrust Arena; 8,845 | 19–13 |
| 33 | September 6 | @ Connecticut Sun | W 109–104 | DeShields (30) | Dolson (9) | Vandersloot (11) | Mohegan Sun Arena; 8,077 | 20–13 |
| 34 | September 8 | @ Washington Mystics | L 86–100 | DeShields (16) | Parker (6) | Vandersloot (6) | St. Elizabeth's East Arena; 4,200 | 20–14 |

2019 season schedule

=== Playoffs ===
2019 playoff game log
Total: 1–1 (Home: 1–0; Road: 0–1)
First Round: 1–0 (Home: 1–0; Road: 0–0)

| Game | Date | Team | Score | High points | High rebounds | High assists | Location Attendance | Series |
|---|---|---|---|---|---|---|---|---|
| 1 | September 11 | Phoenix Mercury | W 105–76 | DeShields (25) | Ndour (9) | Vandersloot (11) | Wintrust Arena; 6,042 | 1–0 |

Second Round: 0–1 (Home: 0–0; Road: 0–1)

| Game | Date | Team | Score | High points | High rebounds | High assists | Location Attendance | Series |
|---|---|---|---|---|---|---|---|---|
| 1 | September 15 | Las Vegas Aces | L 92–93 | DeShields (23) | Ndour (8) | Vandersloot (12) | Thomas & Mack Center; 7,981 | 0–1 |

2019 playoff schedule

== Standings ==
| # | Eastern Conference | W | L | PCT | GB | Home | Road | Conf. |
|---|---|---|---|---|---|---|---|---|
| 1 | Washington Mystics (1) | 26 | 8 | .765 | – | 14–3 | 12–5 | 13–3 |
| 2 | Connecticut Sun (2) | 23 | 11 | .676 | 3 | 15–2 | 8–9 | 11–5 |
| 3 | Chicago Sky (5) | 20 | 14 | .588 | 6 | 12–5 | 8–9 | 11–5 |
| 4 | e –Indiana Fever | 13 | 21 | .382 | 13 | 7–10 | 6–11 | 7–9 |
| 5 | e –New York Liberty | 10 | 24 | .294 | 16 | 4–13 | 6–11 | 3–13 |
| 6 | e –Atlanta Dream | 8 | 26 | .235 | 18 | 5–12 | 3–14 | 3–13 |

Notes

(#) – Conference Standing, Playoff Seeds shown to the right of team name
e – Eliminated from playoffs

== Playoffs ==
**First round** Single elimination (Sept. 11)
5 | **Chicago Sky** | **105**
8 | Phoenix Mercury | 76
6 | **Seattle Storm** | **84**
7 | Minnesota Lynx | 74

**Second round** Single elimination (Sept. 15)
4 | **Las Vegas Aces** | **93**
5 | Chicago Sky | 92
3 | **Los Angeles Sparks** | **92**
6 | Seattle Storm | 69

**Semifinals**; Best-of-5 (Sept. 17 – 24)
1 | **Washington Mystics** | **3**
4 | Las Vegas Aces | 1
2 | **Connecticut Sun** | **3**
3 | Los Angeles Sparks | 0

**WNBA Finals**; Best-of-5 (Sept. 29 – Oct. 10)
1 | **Washington Mystics** | **3**
2 | Connecticut Sun | 2

Note: Teams re-seeded after each round.

- **Bold** – Game or series winner
- Italic – Team with home-court advantage

== Statistics ==
Legend
| GP | Games played | GS | Games started | MPG | Minutes per game | RPG | Rebounds per game |
| APG | Assists per game | SPG | Steals per game | BPG | Blocks per game | PPG | Points per game |
| FG% | Field-goal percentage | 3P% | 3-point field-goal percentage | FT% | Free-throw percentage | TO | Turnovers per game |
| PF | Fouls per game | | Team leader | | League leader |

=== Regular season ===
| Player | GP | GS | MPG | FG% | 3P% | FT% | RPG | APG | SPG | BPG | PPG |
|---|---|---|---|---|---|---|---|---|---|---|---|
| Diamond DeShields | 34 | 34 | 30.2 | 39.9 | 31.6 | 83.6 | 5.5 | 2.4 | 1.3 | 0.4 | 16.2 |
| Allie Quigley | 34 | 34 | 28.6 | 49.3 | 44.2 | 87.0 | 3.0 | 2.5 | 0.8 | 0.2 | 13.8 |
| Courtney Vandersloot | 33 | 33 | 30.0 | 45.2 | 29.0 | 85.0 | 4.3 | 9.1 | 1.4 | 0.5 | 11.2 |
| Jantel Lavender | 23 | 22 | 26.9 | 49.0 | 22.2 | 90.5 | 6.9 | 1.1 | 0.3 | 0.6 | 10.0 |
| Stefanie Dolson | 34 | 34 | 25.0 | 51.9 | 36.1 | 89.8 | 5.6 | 2.2 | 0.6 | 1.0 | 9.3 |
| Cheyenne Parker | 34 | 0 | 19.7 | 45.9 | 27.8 | 84.2 | 5.8 | 0.9 | 0.7 | 1.2 | 8.8 |
| Astou Ndour | 21 | 11 | 17.5 | 49.2 | 42.4 | 72.2 | 4.2 | 0.7 | 0.5 | 0.7 | 6.8 |
| Kahleah Copper | 34 | 0 | 14.8 | 38.7 | 30.6 | 77.1 | 1.9 | 0.9 | 0.4 | 0.1 | 6.7 |
| Gabby Williams | 33 | 2 | 16.0 | 41.4 | 17.1 | 72.5 | 2.2 | 2.1 | 0.7 | 0.2 | 5.6 |
| Kayla Alexander | 3 | 0 | 6.7 | 75.0 | 0 | 75.0 | 2.3 | 0.3 | 0 | 0 | 3.0 |
| Katie Lou Samuelson | 20 | 0 | 7.7 | 31.6 | 27.6 | 80.0 | 0.9 | 0.4 | 0.3 | 0.1 | 2.4 |
| Jamierra Faulkner | 13 | 0 | 5.5 | 33.3 | 11.1 | 50.0 | 0.3 | 0.8 | 0.2 | 0 | 1.3 |

== Awards and honors ==
| Recipient | Award | Date awarded | Ref. |
|---|---|---|---|
| Allie Quigley | WNBA All-Star Selection | July 15, 2019 | |
| Diamond DeShields | WNBA All-Star Selection | July 15, 2019 | |
| Diamond DeShields | WNBA All-Star Weekend Skills Challenge Champion | July 26, 2019 | |
| Diamond DeShields | All-WNBA Second Team | October 6, 2019 | |
| Courtney Vandersloot | WNBA All-Star Selection | July 15, 2019 | |
| Courtney Vandersloot | WNBA Eastern Conference Player of the Week | August 26, 2019 | |
| Courtney Vandersloot | Peak Performer: Assists | September 9, 2019 | |
| Courtney Vandersloot | All-WNBA First Team | October 6, 2019 | |
| James Wade | Coach of the Year | September 11, 2019 | |
