= Ariel Atkins =

American basketball player (born 1996)

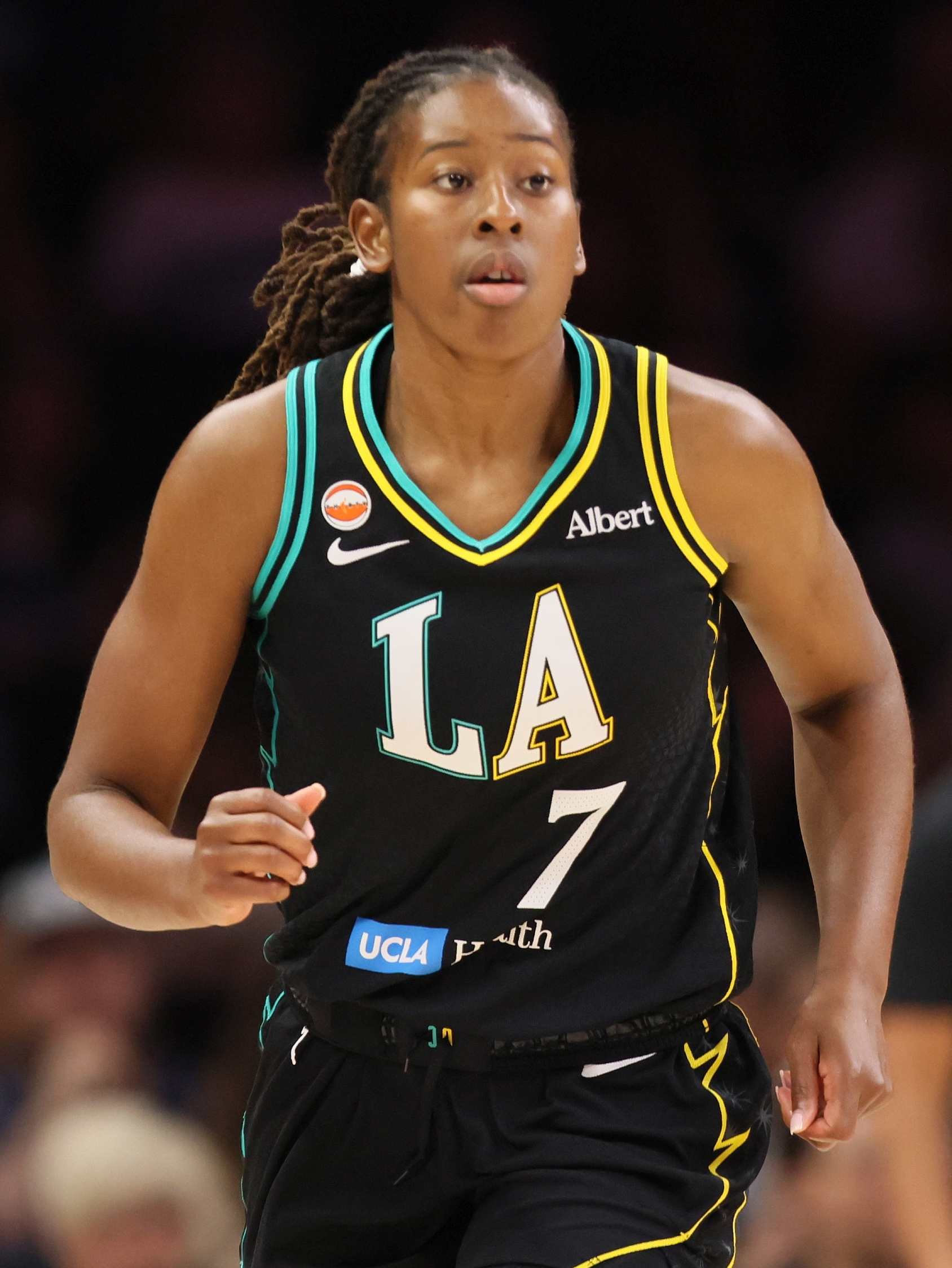
- Atkins with the Los Angeles Sparks in 2026

No. 7 – Los Angeles Sparks
- Position: Shooting guard
- League: WNBA

Personal information
- Born: July 30, 1996 (age 30) Dallas, Texas, U.S.
- Listed height: 5 ft 10 in (1.78 m)
- Listed weight: 167 lb (76 kg)

Career information
- High school: Duncanville (Duncanville, Texas)
- College: Texas (2014–2018)
- WNBA draft: 2018: 1st round, 7th overall pick
- Drafted by: Washington Mystics
- Playing career: 2018–present
- Coaching career: 2023–present

Career history

Playing
- 2018–2024: Washington Mystics
- 2018–2019: InvestInTheWest ENEA Gorzów
- 2019–2020: Perth Lynx
- 2020: Elazığ İl Özel İdarespor
- 2021–2022: BC Prometey
- 2024–2025: Fenerbahçe
- 2025: Rose BC
- 2025: Chicago Sky
- 2026–present: Los Angeles Sparks

Coaching
- 2023–2024: Michigan (assistant)

Career highlights
- WNBA champion (2019); 2× WNBA All-Star (2021, 2022); WNBA All-Defensive First Team (2022); 4× WNBA All-Defensive Second Team (2018–2021); WNBA All-Rookie Team (2018); 2× First-team All-Big 12 (2017, 2018); Second-team All-Big 12 (2016); 2× Big 12 All-Defensive Team (2017, 2018); Big 12 All-Freshman Team (2015); Morgan Wootten Player of the Year (2014); McDonald's All-American (2014); Texas Miss Basketball (2013); FIBA Europe SuperCup Women champion (2024); Turkish Presidential Cup champion (2024)
- Stats at Basketball Reference
Medals
Women's basketball
Representing the United States
Olympic Games
Gold medal – first place	2020 Tokyo	Team
World Cup
Gold medal – first place	2022 Australia
FIBA Under-18 Americas Championship
Gold medal – first place	2014 United States	Team

Ariel Atkins (born July 30, 1996) is an American professional basketball player for the Los Angeles Sparks of the Women's National Basketball Association (WNBA) and Athletes Unlimited Pro Basketball. In addition to her playing career, she served as a player development coach at the University of Michigan during the 2023–2024 off-season.

Drafted 7th overall by the Washington Mystics in the 2018 WNBA draft, Atkins quickly established herself as a key player. She helped lead the Mystics to the WNBA Finals in her debut season and was a pivotal figure in their 2019 WNBA Championship victory. Atkins' defensive prowess earned her 5 selections to the WNBA All-Defensive Team. She is the first, and as of 2025, the only player to do so in her first five years in the league.

In 2021, Atkins won her first Olympic Gold medal with Team USA at the 2020 Summer Olympics.

== College career ==
Born in Dallas, Texas, Atkins attended Duncanville in Duncanville, Texas. She played college basketball at the University of Texas, where she was recognized for her athletic performance, academic achievements, community service, and leadership. She graduated in May 2018 with a major in sport management.

== Professional career ==
=== WNBA ===
==== Washington Mystics (2018–2024) ====
At the 2018 WNBA draft, Atkins was drafted by the Washington Mystics in the first round, as the seventh overall pick. Atkins would join a Mystics line-up alongside players such as Elena Delle Donne, Kristi Toliver & Natasha Cloud. In August 2018, Atkins was named to the All-Defensive Second Team in her debut season. Later in September 2018, Atkins was also named to the All-Rookie Team.

On October 10, 2019, Atkins and the Mystics took home their first WNBA Championship after defeating the Connecticut Sun, 3–2. In September 2020, Atkins was named to the All-Defensive Second Team for the third time in her three career seasons.

In August 2023, Atkins signed a multi-year extension to stay in Washington with the Mystics.

==== Chicago Sky (2025) ====
On February 23, 2025, Atkins was traded to the Chicago Sky in exchange for the 2025 third overall pick, the 2027 second-round pick, and the rights to swap 2027 first-round picks.

==== Los Angeles Sparks (2026–present) ====
On April 12, 2026, Atkins was traded to the Los Angeles Sparks in exchange for Rickea Jackson.

=== International ===
Atkins has also played internationally. She spent the 2018–19 season with InvestInTheWest ENEA Gorzów Wielkopolski in Poland and played for the Perth Lynx in Australia during the 2019–20 off-season.

=== Unrivaled ===
On February 21, 2025, Unrivaled signed Atkins to a relief player contract.

=== Athletes Unlimited ===
In September 2025, Atkins joined Athletes Unlimited Pro Basketball for its fifth season in Nashville, adding to her professional résumé alongside her WNBA and international career.

== National team career ==
=== 2020 Olympics ===
In late March 2020, the International Olympic Committee (IOC) and the Tokyo Metropolitan Government postponed the 2020 Summer Olympics until the summer of 2021 due to the COVID-19 pandemic. On June 21, 2021, Atkins was named to the 12-player roster for Team USA for the 2020 summer Olympics. She and Team USA went on to win the gold medal in the tournament, defeating Japan 90–75 in the final.

== Career statistics ==
Legend
GP	Games played	GS	Games started	MPG	Minutes per game	RPG	Rebounds per game
APG	Assists per game	SPG	Steals per game	BPG	Blocks per game	PPG	Points per game
TO	Turnovers per game	FG%	Field-goal percentage	3P%	3-point field-goal percentage	FT%	Free-throw percentage
**Bold**	Career best	°	League leader

†	Denotes season(s) in which Atkins won a WNBA championship

=== WNBA ===
==== Regular season ====
WNBA regular season statistics
Year	Team	GP	GS	MPG	FG%	3P%	FT%	RPG	APG	SPG	BPG	TO	PPG
2018	Washington	29	24	22.5	.432	.357	.824	2.4	2.1	1.3	.3	1.3	11.3
2019^{†}	Washington	33	33	24.3	.416	.357	.811	2.8	1.9	1.5	.5	**1.0**	10.3
2020	Washington	22	22	**31.0**	.438	**.411**	.886	2.9	2.4	**1.8**	.3	1.9	14.8
2021	Washington	30	30	30.6	.407	.359	.831	2.8	2.6	1.6	.5	2.0	**16.2**
2022	Washington	36	36	30.0	.420	.365	.845	3.3	2.3	1.4	.3	1.4	14.6
2023	Washington	27	27	25.1	.414	.339	.897	3.1	2.3	1.2	.3	1.3	11.5
2024	Washington	40	40	29.9	.437	.357	.848	**3.4**	3.1	1.5	.4	2.3	14.9
2025	Chicago	34	34	28.6	**.444**	.361	.860	**3.4**	**3.6**	1.6	**.7**	2.5	13.1
2026	Los Angeles	**42**	**42**	26.9	.381	.282	**.932**°	2.9	2.8	1.6	.4	1.4	8.5
**Career**	9 years, 3 teams	293	288	27.7	.421	.352	.857	3.0	2.6	1.5	.4	1.7	12.7
**Career**	All-Star	2	0	15.8	.444	.333	—	2.5	2.5	.5	.0	.5	5.0

==== Playoffs ====
WNBA playoff statistics
Year	Team	GP	GS	MPG	FG%	3P%	FT%	RPG	APG	SPG	BPG	TO	PPG
2018	Washington	**9**	**9**	27.9	**.480**	.424	.879	3.7	1.9	1.1	.1	.8	15.2
2019^{†}	Washington	**9**	**9**	19.8	.373	.333	.929	2.7	2.3	.8	.0	1.2	7.3
2020	Washington	1	1	**36.0**	.375	.000	**1.000**	4.0	4.0	**2.0**	.0	**.0**	13.0
2022	Washington	2	2	33.0	.379	**.500**	**1.000**	1.5	**5.5**	.5	.0	1.0	**15.5**
2023	Washington	2	2	33.5	.345	.250	**1.000**	**5.5**	3.0	**2.0**°	**1.5**	1.5	13.5
**Career**	5 years, 1 team	23	23	26.0	.416	.371	.907	3.3	2.6	1.1	.2	1.0	11.9

=== College ===
NCAA statistics
Year	Team	GP	GS	MPG	FG%	3P%	FT%	RPG	APG	SPG	BPG	TO	PPG
2014–15	Texas	27	19	23.9	.363	.288	.825	3.4	1.3	1.2	.2	2.2	9.7
2015–16	Texas	27	14	21.0	**.536**	.356	.819	3.9	1.3	1.3	.2	**1.4**	11.2
2016–17	Texas	32	32	26.6	.456	.377	.818	4.2	1.6	2.0	.3	**1.4**	12.8
2017–18	Texas	**35**	**35**	**27.7**	.534	**.420**	**.859**	**5.5**	**3.2**	**2.5**	**.6**	2.0	**14.9**
**Career**		121	100	25.1	.475	.373	.831	4.3	1.9	1.8	.4	1.7	12.4

== Off the court ==
=== Philanthropy ===
In February 2024, Atkins joined the WNBA Changemakers Collective and their collaboration with VOICEINSPORT (VIS) as a mentor, "aimed at keeping girls in sport and developing diverse leaders on the court and beyond the game."
