= Shatori Walker-Kimbrough =

American basketball player (born 1995)

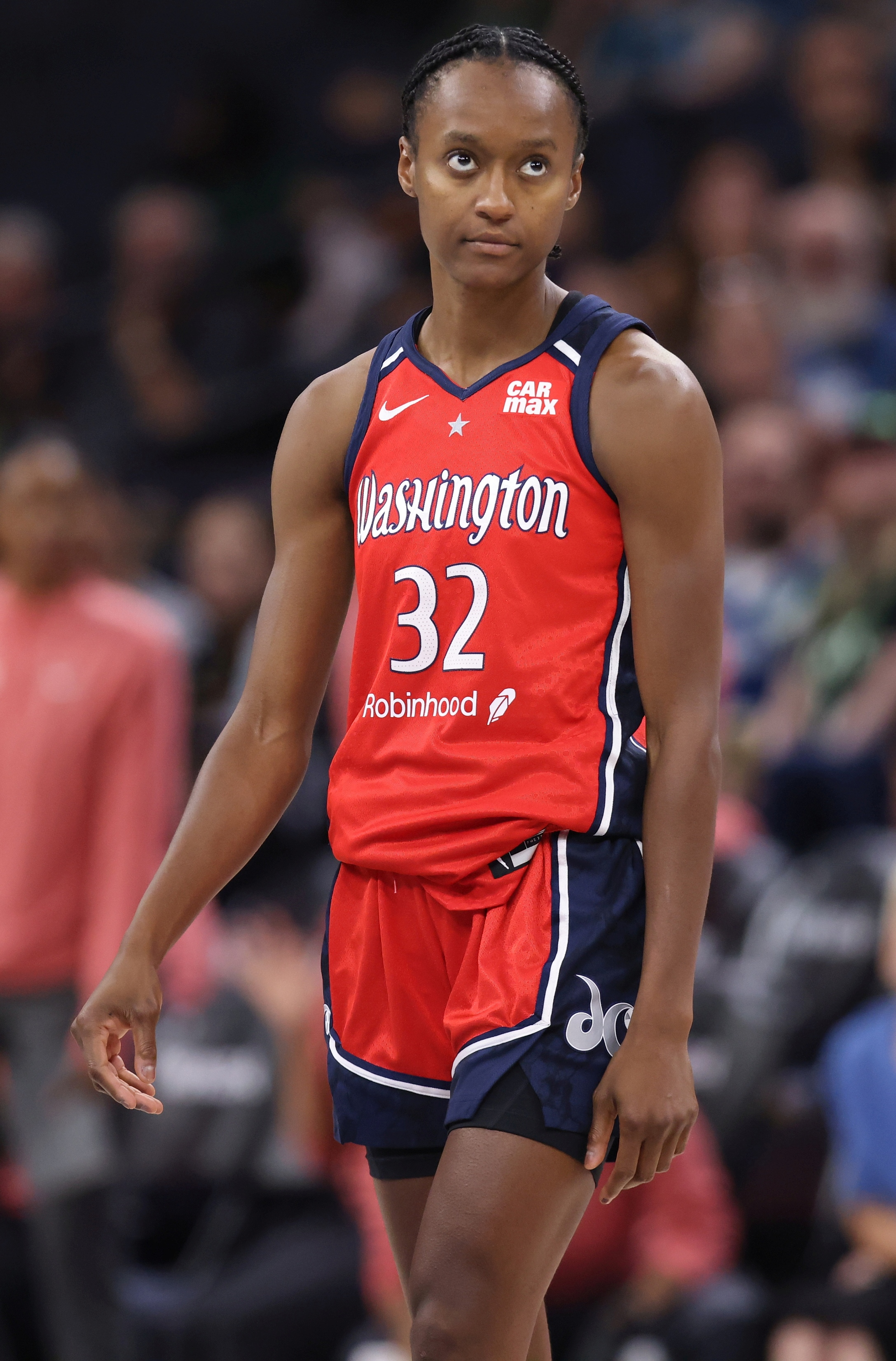
- Walker-Kimbrough with the Washington Mystics in 2024

No. 33 – Atlanta Dream
- Position: Shooting guard
- League: WNBA

Personal information
- Born: May 18, 1995 (age 31) Aliquippa, Pennsylvania, U.S.
- Listed height: 5 ft 9 in (1.75 m)
- Listed weight: 140 lb (64 kg)

Career information
- High school: Hopewell (Aliquippa, Pennsylvania)
- College: Maryland (2013–2017)
- WNBA draft: 2017: 1st round, 6th overall pick
- Drafted by: Washington Mystics
- Playing career: 2017–present

Career history
- 2017–2019: Washington Mystics
- 2017: OGM Ormanspor
- 2018: MBK Ružomberok
- 2018–2020: Diósgyőri VTK
- 2020: Phoenix Mercury
- 2020–2021: Gorzów Wielkopolski
- 2021: Connecticut Sun
- 2021–2024: Washington Mystics
- 2021–2022: A.S. Ramat Hasharon
- 2022–2023: Maccabi Bnot Ashdod
- 2023–2024: Çankaya Üniversitesi S.K.
- 2024–2025: Gorzów Wielkopolski
- 2025–2026: Atlanta Dream
- 2026: Indiana Fever
- 2026-present: Atlanta Dream

Career highlights
- Israeli Cup winner (2023); WNBA champion (2019); WNBA All-Rookie Team (2017); 2× Third-team All-American – AP (2016, 2017); 2× All-American – USBWA (2016, 2017); Big Ten Tournament MOP (2016); 3× First-team All-Big Ten (2015–2017); 2× Big Ten All-Defensive Team (2016, 2017)
- Stats at WNBA.com
- Stats at Basketball Reference
Medals
Women's basketball
Representing the United States
Pan American Games
Silver medal – second place	2015 Toronto	Team

Shatori Walker-Kimbrough (born May 18, 1995) is an American professional basketball player for the Atlanta Dream of the Women's National Basketball Association (WNBA). She played college basketball for the Maryland Terrapins and was drafted by the Washington Mystics with the sixth overall pick in the 2017 WNBA draft.

== College career ==
Walker-Kimbrough played four years of college basketball for the Maryland Terrapins between 2013 and 2017. She earned first-team All-Big Ten as a sophomore, junior and senior, and Big Ten All-Defensive Team as a junior and senior.

== Professional career ==
=== WNBA ===
Walker-Kimbrough was drafted with the sixth overall pick in the 2017 WNBA draft by the Washington Mystics. She played her first three WNBA seasons with the Mystics.

On April 15, 2020, Walker-Kimbrough was traded to the New York Liberty in a deal that sent Tina Charles to Washington. Two days later, the Liberty traded her to the Phoenix Mercury in exchange for the draft rights of Jocelyn Willoughby.

Walker-Kimbrough started the 2021 WNBA season with the Connecticut Sun, where she signed a hardship contract and played one game.

Later in the 2021 season, she returned to the Washington Mystics. She continued with the Mystics in 2022, 2023 and 2024.

On February 1, 2025, Walker-Kimbrough signed with the Atlanta Dream.

Walker-Kimbrough signed with the Indiana Fever on April 15, 2026.

On May 21, 2026, Walker-Kimbrough was waived by The Indiana Fever.

Walker-Kimbrough signed a rest-of-season contract with the Atlanta Dreamon July 7, 2026.

=== Overseas ===
Walker-Kimbrough started the 2017–18 season in Turkey with OGM Ormanspor. In January 2018, she joined MBK Ružomberok in Slovakia. She played for Diósgyőri VTK in Hungary in 2018–19 and 2019–20, and then Gorzów Wielkopolski in Poland 2020–21. For the 2021–22 season, she played for A.S. Ramat Hasharon in Israel. She continued in Israel in 2022–23 with Maccabi Bnot Ashdod, where she averaged 20.0 points, 7.6 rebounds, 5.3 assists, and 2.4 steals per game. For the 2023–24 season, she played for Çankaya Üniversitesi S.K. in Turkey.

Walker-Kimbrough returned to Gorzów for the 2024-2025 season. She won the Polish Cup with the team and reached the Polish league finals, where Gorzów fell 0–3 to Arka Gdynia.

== Career statistics ==
Legend
GP	Games played	GS	Games started	MPG	Minutes per game	FG%	Field goal percentage
3P%	3-point field goal percentage	FT%	Free throw percentage	RPG	Rebounds per game	APG	Assists per game
SPG	Steals per game	BPG	Blocks per game	TO	Turnovers per game	PPG	Points per game
**Bold**	Career high	*	Led Division I

†	Denotes season(s) in which Walker-Kimbrough won a WNBA championship

=== WNBA ===
==== Regular season ====
WNBA regular season statistics
Year	Team	GP	GS	MPG	FG%	3P%	FT%	RPG	APG	SPG	BPG	TO	PPG
2017	Washington	27	8	12.4	.371	.333	.854	1.1	.4	.6	.1	.6	4.4
2018	Washington	19	1	8.8	.429	.304	**1.000**	.8	.4	.4	.3	.8	3.5
2019^{†}	Washington	34	1	17.1	.432	.310	.930	1.6	1.2	.8	.2	1.0	6.7
2020	Phoenix	21	10	19.0	.429	.431	.920	1.6	1.5	**1.1**	.4	1.0	7.3
2021	Connecticut	1	0	4.0	—	—	—	1.0	.0	.0	**1.0**	1.0	.0
2021	Washington	16	13	21.6	.513	.320	.857	1.4	1.0	.8	.3	1.2	7.4
2022	Washington	35	3	20.1	.402	.347	.902	1.8	1.5	**1.1**	.3	1.1	6.9
2023	Washington	40	**15**	**24.8**	.429	.390	.936	**2.1**	1.7	.7	.4	.7	6.3
2024	Washington	40	2	22.1	.415	.330	.806	1.7	**1.9**	**1.1**	.5	1.4	**7.5**
2025	Atlanta	**41**	1	8.6	.413	.355	.727	.9	.5	.2	.3	.4	1.7
2026	Indiana	2	0	3.5	.000	—	—	.0	.0	.0	.0	.5	.0
2026	Atlanta	13	0	3.0	**.667**	**1.000**	**1.000**	.5	.6	.2	.0	**.2**	1.3
**Career**	10 years, 5 teams	289	54	16.7	.423	.351	.883	1.4	1.2	.7	.3	.8	5.4

==== Playoffs ====
WNBA playoff statistics
Year	Team	GP	GS	MPG	FG%	3P%	FT%	RPG	APG	SPG	BPG	TO	PPG
2017	Washington	3	0	2.0	.000	—	—	.0	.0	.0	.0	**.0**	.0
2018	Washington	4	0	2.3	**1.000**	—	—	.3	.0	.3	.0	.3	1.5
2019^{†}	Washington	**8**	0	7.0	.412	.429	**1.000**	.4	.4	.3	.1	.5	2.4
2020	Phoenix	2	**1**	19.0	.500	**.667**	.500	**1.5**	**1.5**	.0	.5	1.0	**8.5**
2022	Washington	2	0	**20.5**	.556	.500	**1.000**	.0	.5	**1.5**	.0	.5	7.5
2023	Washington	2	0	11.0	.400	.000	.500	**1.5**	.5	1.0	**1.5**	1.5	2.5
2025	Atlanta	2	0	3.0	—	—	—	.5	.5	1.0	.5	**.0**	.0
**Career**	7 years, 3 teams	23	1	7.7	.489	.500	.667	.5	.4	.4	.3	.5	2.7

=== College ===
NCAA statistics
Year	Team	GP	GS	MPG	FG%	3P%	FT%	RPG	APG	SPG	BPG	TO	PPG
2013–14	Maryland	35	0	17.3	.478	.397	.766	2.9	1.5	1.2	.2	**1.4**	9.3
2014–15	Maryland	**37**	**37**	29.5	.513	.340	.804	5.3	2.1	1.5	.5	2.1	13.3
2015–16	Maryland	35	34	**31.3**	**.543**	**.545***	.809	**6.0**	3.3	1.9	**1.1**	3.4	**19.5**
2016–17	Maryland	35	34	29.2	.526	.450	**.816**	3.7	**3.6**	**1.9**	.7	2.9	18.8
**Career**		142	105	26.9	.520	.459	.803	4.5	2.6	1.6	.6	2.4	15.2
