= Myisha Hines-Allen =

American basketball player (born 1995)

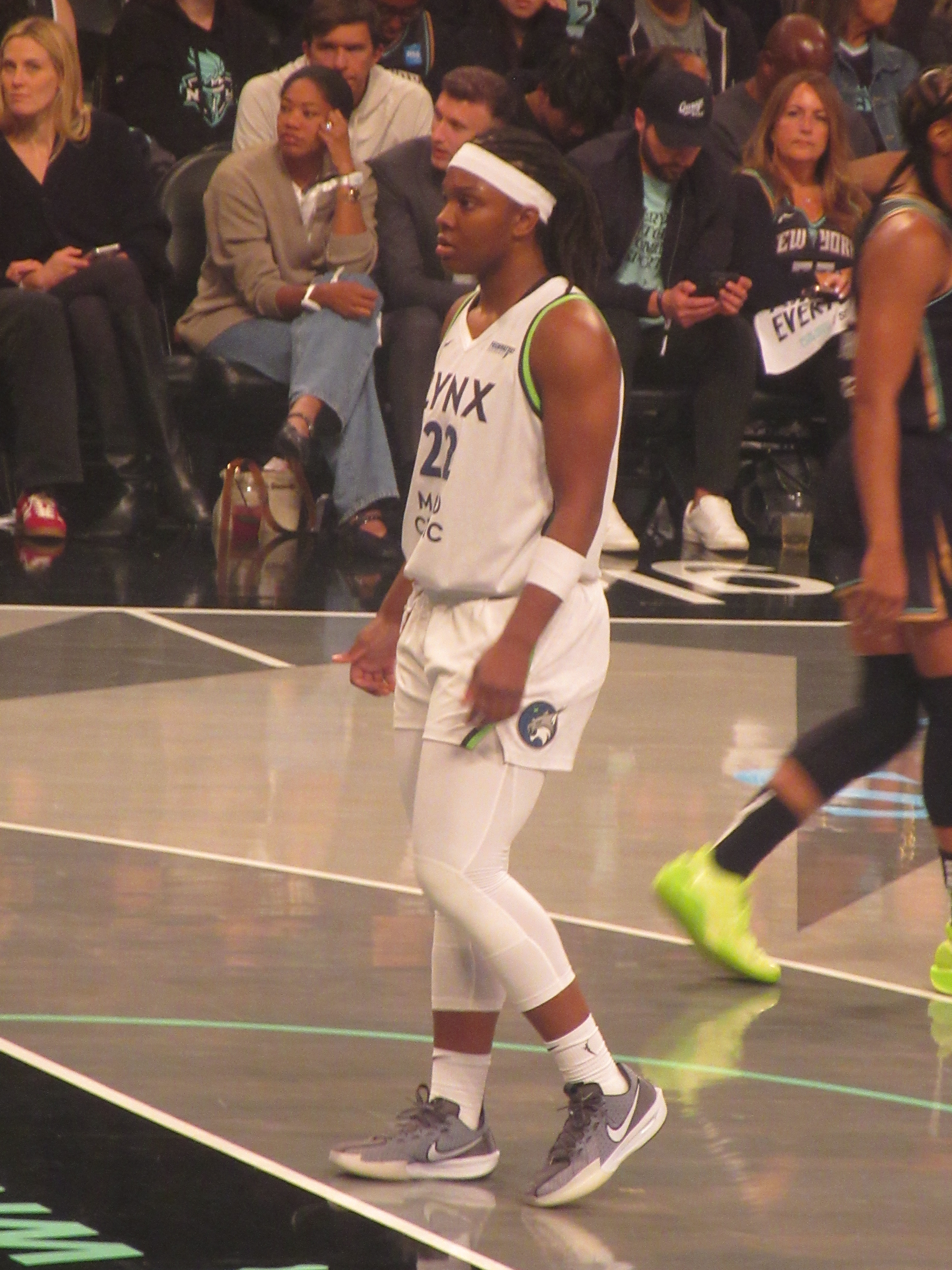
- Hines-Allen in Game 1 of the 2024 WNBA Finals

No. 2 – Indiana Fever
- Position: Small forward
- League: WNBA

Personal information
- Born: May 30, 1995 (age 31) Montclair, New Jersey, U.S.
- Listed height: 6 ft 1 in (1.85 m)
- Listed weight: 200 lb (91 kg)

Career information
- High school: Montclair (Montclair, New Jersey)
- College: Louisville (2014–2018)
- WNBA draft: 2018: 2nd round, 19th overall pick
- Playing career: 2018–present

Career history
- 2018–2024: Washington Mystics
- 2018–2019: Enisey Krasnoyarsk
- 2020–2021: Lattes Montpellier
- 2021–2023: Virtus Bologna
- 2023–2024: Galatasaray
- 2024: Minnesota Lynx
- 2024–2025: Heilongjiang Dragons
- 2025: Dallas Wings
- 2026–present: Indiana Fever

Career highlights
- WNBA champion (2019); All-WNBA Second Team (2020); Third-team All-American – AP (2018); ACC Tournament MVP (2018); ACC Player of the Year (2016); 3× First-team All-ACC (2016–2018); McDonald's All-American (2014)
- Stats at Basketball Reference

Myisha Hines-Allen (born May 30, 1995) is an American professional basketball player for the Indiana Fever of the Women's National Basketball Association (WNBA). In college she played for the University of Louisville.

Growing up in Montclair, New Jersey, Hines-Allen was a fan of the WNBA, particularly the New York Liberty. She attended Montclair High School.

== Professional career ==
=== WNBA ===
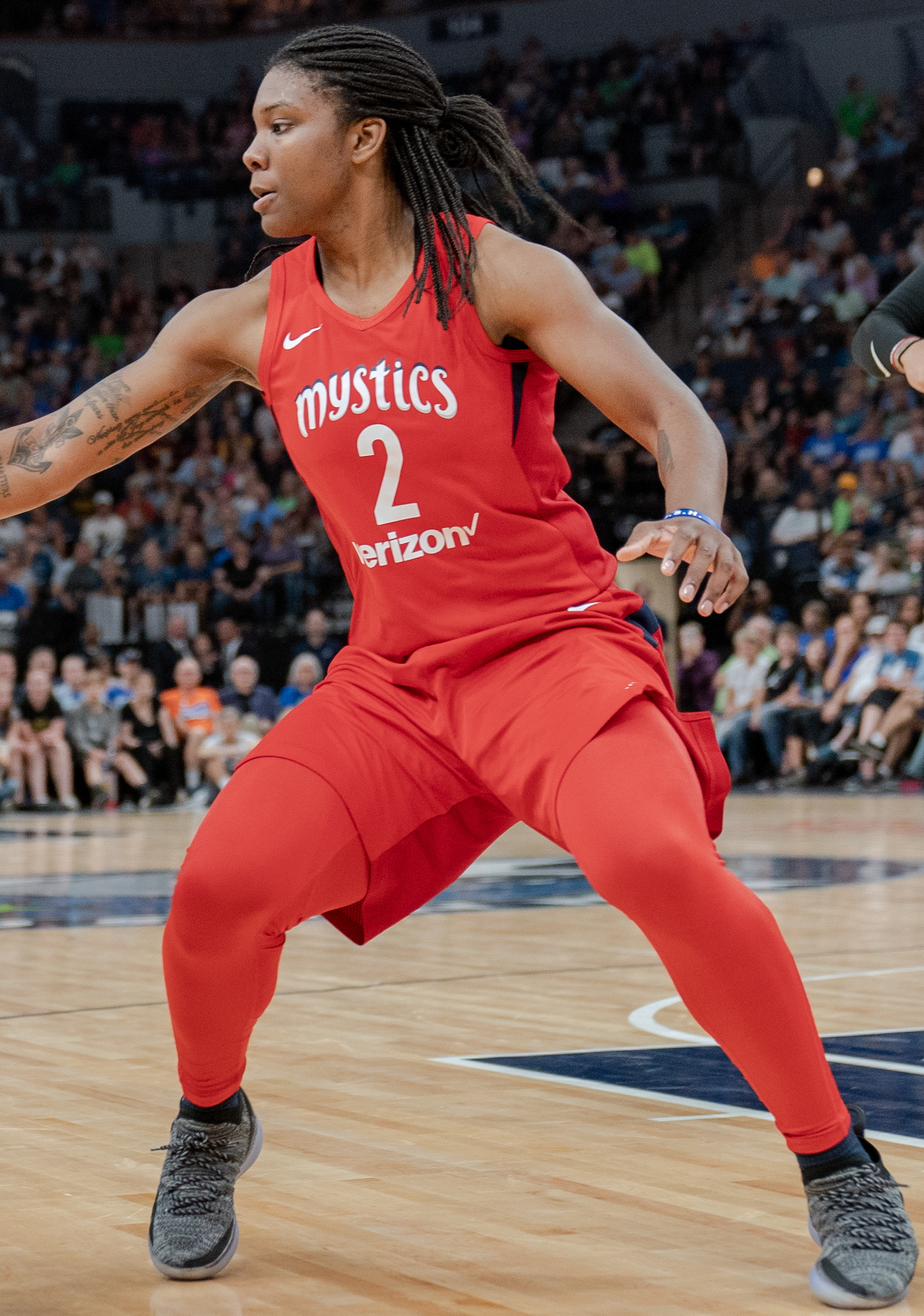
Hines-Allen in 2018 with Washington

Hines-Allen was drafted by the Washington Mystics in the second round of the 2018 WNBA draft. She is one of only two Mystics players to get to more than 1,400 points, 900 rebounds and 300 assists playing for the team. She is 8th for the Mystics franchise history on rebounds. On the Mystics, she was called on to be versatile, switching between starting and coming off the bench and playing different roles. After playing seven seasons, 187 regular-season games, for the Washington Mystics, Hines-Allen was traded to the Minnesota Lynx at the trade deadline for the 2024 season.

In August 2024, Hines-Allen was traded to the Minnesota Lynx in exchange for Olivia Époupa, Sika Koné and a second-round pick in the 2026 WNBA draft.

On February 2, 2025, Hines-Allen signed with the Dallas Wings.

Hines-Allen signed with the Indiana Fever on April 13, 2026.

=== Overseas ===
On September 25, 2023, she signed with Galatasaray of the Turkish Women's Basketball Super League (TKBL). In the statement made by Galatasaray on February 28, 2024, it was announced that the contract with Hines-Allen was terminated unilaterally.

Hines-Allen signed with the Heilongjiang Dragons of the Women's Chinese Basketball Association for the 2024–2025 season.

== College statistics ==
Legend
GP	Games played	GS	Games started	MPG	Minutes per game
FG%	Field goal percentage	3P%	3-point field goal percentage	FT%	Free throw percentage
RPG	Rebounds per game	APG	Assists per game	SPG	Steals per game
BPG	Blocks per game	PPG	Points per game	**Bold**	Career high

Year	Team	GP	Points	FG%	3P%	FT%	RPG	APG	SPG	BPG	PPG
2014–15	Louisville	34	402	**55.8%**	0.0%	62.8%	4.9	0.9	0.6	0.4	11.8
2015–16	Louisville	33	**581**	54.7%	12.5%	**80.0%**	8.4	1.1	1.1	**0.8**	**17.6**
2016–17	Louisville	36	499	49.3%	33.3%	73.1%	9.3	1.7	0.9	0.4	13.9
2017–18	Louisville	**39**	546	52.7%	**42.9%**	63.3%	**9.6**	**2.2**	**1.3**	0.5	14.0
Career		142	2028	52.9%	31.3%	70.7%	8.1	1.5	1.0	0.5	14.3

== WNBA career statistics ==
Legend
GP	Games played	GS	Games started	MPG	Minutes per game	RPG	Rebounds per game
APG	Assists per game	SPG	Steals per game	BPG	Blocks per game	PPG	Points per game
TO	Turnovers per game	FG%	Field-goal percentage	3P%	3-point field-goal percentage	FT%	Free-throw percentage
**Bold**	Career best	°	League leader

=== Regular season ===
Year	Team	GP	GS	MPG	FG%	3P%	FT%	RPG	APG	SPG	BPG	TO	PPG
2018	Washington	24	1	10.5	.450	.333	.654	2.9	.4	.4	.2	**.4**	3.8
2019^{†}	Washington	27	0	7.8	.362	.375	.583	2.1	.9	.3	.4	.8	2.3
2020	Washington	22	**22**	**30.0**	**.510**	**.426**	.828	**8.9**	2.6	**1.4**	.2	2.2	**17.0**
2021	Washington	18	17	25.7	.414	.317	.732	7.0	2.5	1.3	**.6**	1.8	12.9
2022	Washington	34	15	19.3	.415	.367	.703	5.3	1.9	.8	.3	1.7	8.9
2023	Washington	35	18	17.6	.340	.273	.717	4.4	2.2	.7	.2	1.5	5.6
2024	Washington	27	10	19.1	.489	.359	.829	4.9	2.7	.6	.1	1.4	8.0
2024	Minnesota	13	1	17.7	.500	.364	**.839**	4.2	2.2	.8	.2	1.3	7.5
2025	Dallas	**40**	20	22.1	.450	.267	.747	6.0	**2.9**	.8	.5	2.2	7.6
2026	Indiana	38	3	13.9	.487	.320	.606	3.3	1.5	.5	.4	1.2	3.8
Career	9 years, 4 teams	278	107	18.0	.441	.337	.739	4.8	2.0	.7	.3	1.5	7.3

=== Playoffs ===
Myisha Hines-Allen Playoff Statistics
Year	Team	GP	GS	MPG	FG%	3P%	FT%	RPG	APG	SPG	BPG	TO	PPG
2018	Washington	6	0	11.3	**.833**	**1.000**	—	2.7	.5	.2	.0	**.0**	5.2
2019^{†}	Washington	1	0	3.0	.000	.000	—	1.0	**2.0**	.0	1.0	**.0**	.0
2020	Washington	1	1	27.0	.667	**1.000**	**1.000**	**9.0**	1.0	.0	**2.0**	3.0	11.0
2022	Washington	2	0	14.5	.182	.000	**1.000**	3.5	**2.0**	**1.0**	.0	1.0	5.0
2023	Washington	2	**2**	**29.5**	.636	.333	.500	6.0	**2.0**	.0	.0	1.5	**15.5**
2024	Minnesota	**11**	0	11.2	.415	.000	.750	3.0	1.0	.3	.1	1.1	3.6
2026	Indiana	2	0	16.0	.600	.000	**1.000**	8.5	1.0	.5	.0	1.5	7.0
**Career**	7 years, 3 teams	25	3	13.6	.532	.214	.818	3.8	1.1	.3	.2	.9	5.5

== Personal life ==
Hines-Allen started DJing while playing in Turkey. She has a dog named Ace.

Her younger brother, Josh Hines-Allen, is a defensive end for the Jacksonville Jaguars. She also has multiple sisters playing basketball at NCAA schools.
