= Gabby Williams =

American-French basketball player (born 1996)

- Williams with France in 2026

No. 1 – Golden State Valkyries
- Position: Power forward / small forward
- League: WNBA

Personal information
- Born: September 9, 1996 (age 30) Sparks, Nevada, U.S.
- Listed height: 5 ft 11 in (1.80 m)
- Listed weight: 172 lb (78 kg)

Career information
- High school: Reed (Sparks, Nevada)
- College: UConn (2014–2018)
- WNBA draft: 2018: 1st round, 4th overall pick
- Drafted by: Chicago Sky
- Playing career: 2018–present

Career history
- 2018–2020: Chicago Sky
- 2018–2019: Dike Basket Napoli
- 2019: Uni Girona CB
- 2019–2020: Lattes-Montpellier
- 2020–2022: Sopron
- 2022–2025: Seattle Storm
- 2022–2024: ASVEL
- 2024–2026: Fenerbahçe
- 2026–present: Golden State Valkyries

Career highlights
- WNBA champion (2026); WNBA Finals MVP (2026); 2026 FIBA Women Basketball World Cup best defensive player; 2× WNBA All-Star (2025, 2026); 2× WNBA All-Defensive First Team (2025, 2026); WNBA All-Defensive Second Team (2022); WNBA steals leader (2025); 2× EuroLeague champion (2022, 2026); EuroLeague final four MVP (2022); 2× All-EuroLeague First Team (2021, 2025); 2× All-EuroLeague Second Team (2022, 2026); 3× EuroLeague Defensive Player of the Year (2021, 2025, 2026); FIBA Europe SuperCup Women champion (2024); FIBA Europe SuperCup Women MVP (2024); EuroCup champion (2023); 2× Turkish Super League champion (2025, 2026); Turkish Cup champion (2026); 2× Turkish Presidential Cup champion (2024, 2025); French champion (2023); 2× Alain Gilles Trophy (2024, 2026); 2× Hungarian champion (2021, 2022); Liga Día champion (2019); 2× NCAA champion (2015, 2016); Senior CLASS Award (2018); Cheryl Miller Award (2018); 2× Second-team All-American – AP (2017, 2018); 2× WBCA Coaches' All-American (2017, 2018); All-American – USBWA (2017); WBCA Defensive Player of the Year (2017); AAC Defensive Player of the Year (2017); 2× First-team All-AAC (2017, 2018); AAC Sixth Player of the Year (2015); AAC All-Freshman Team (2015); McDonald's All-American (2014)
- Stats at Basketball Reference

Gabrielle Lisa Williams (born September 9, 1996) is a French-American professional basketball player for the Golden State Valkyries of the Women's National Basketball Association (WNBA) and for the Laces of Unrivaled. She was selected fourth overall by the Chicago Sky in the 2018 WNBA draft. She was a EuroLeague champion in 2022, when she was named the Final Four MVP, and again in 2026. Williams played forward in college for the UConn Huskies, and won back to back national championships in 2015 and 2016. She has played for the French national team in the Tokyo 2020 and the Paris 2024 Olympic games. After signing with the Golden State Valkyries ahead of the 2026 WNBA season, Williams helped lead the franchise to its first WNBA Championship and was named 2026 WNBA Finals MVP.

== Early life ==
Williams was raised in Sparks, Nevada, by her father Matthew, who is Black American, and mother Thérèse, who is French. Williams maintains both American and French citizenship and is fluent in French, having grown up speaking it with her grandmother Angela Bishop, a Parisian who lived down the street from Williams’ family.

Williams spent her summers growing up in the East Bay. At age nine, she played youth basketball under her childhood coach Alfonso Joo of the Bay Area BullDawgs. Her father, Matt, played college basketball and was a high jumper for the track team at the University of Nevada-Reno. He is a central figure in Reno-area AAU basketball as he ran the Jam On It Reno AAU Memorial Day Tournament, which had 970 teams playing on 69 courts in the city in one of its editions. Williams has an older sister, Kayla, who played basketball professionally in Australia.

== High school ==
=== Basketball ===
Williams attended and played basketball at Edward C. Reed High School in Sparks, Nevada. As a sophomore she averaged 18 points, 10 rebounds, and seven steals per game in leading Reed to the Class 4A state title. Williams had 15 points, 14 rebounds, and six assists in a semifinal win over Foothill, then had 24 points, four rebounds, and four assists in the championship game win over Reno and was named the Las Vegas Review-Journal Class 4A state Player of the Year. During her junior year, Williams was averaging 30 points, 11 rebounds, six assists, and seven blocked shots per game when she suffered a completely torn anterior cruciate ligament and partially-torn meniscus in her right knee on Jan 19 just 30-seconds into a game against rival Reno High. She had season-ending surgery Feb 11 and was cleared to return to full basketball activity Oct. 10.

=== Track and field ===
Williams was an accomplished multi-event track and field athlete at Edward C. Reed High. She was named the 2011 Gatorade Nevada Girls Track & Field Athlete of the Year, honoring the best track and field athlete in high school while still a freshman. She competed in the state meet, finishing second in the 100 meter hurdles and third in the 300 meter hurdles as well as helping the 4 x 400 meter relay team finish second. She cleared 5'8" in the high jump, which ranked number 36 among all high school players in the nation.

As a sophomore in 2012, she repeated as the Gatorade Nevada Girls Track & Field Athlete of the Year. At the state championships, she won the 100 meter hurdles as well as the 300 meter hurdles and cleared 5'11" to win the high jump. At a regional meet, she cleared 6 feet 1.5 inches, which ranked as the top performance among high school girls at the time and would have been the second best among all of NCAA Division I. At the 2012 United States Olympic trials, she cleared 6 feet 2 1/4 inches to finish in fifth place. She was too young to be eligible for the US world Junior team, although she qualified as an alternate for the 2012 London Olympics.

== College ==
=== University of Connecticut ===
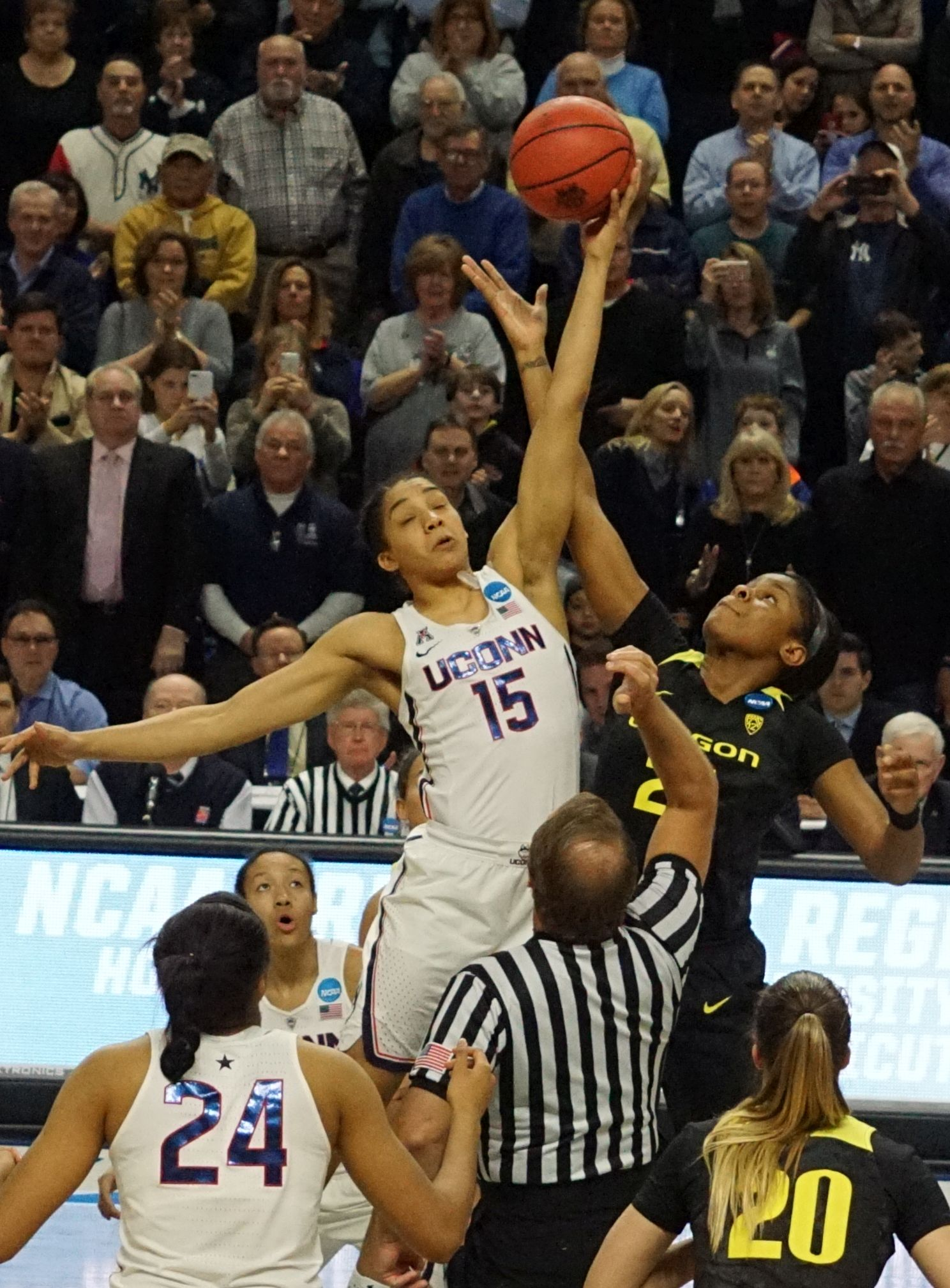
Williams winning a jump ball against Oregon in 2017

Williams helped UConn reach a 148–3 record over her four-year career, which included four Final Four appearances and back to back National Championships. She had one of only five Huskies triple-doubles in school history. She is one of only nine Huskies with at least 1,000 points and 1,000 rebounds. Williams finished her career 22nd on UConn's all-time scoring list at 1,582 career points, seventh with 1,007 career rebounds, 13th in assists (481) and fifth in steals (305). Williams was named the 2017 American Athletic Conference and WBCA NCAA Division I Defensive Player of the Year and 2018 Lowe's Senior Class Award.

==== Awards and honors ====
- 2017–United States Basketball Writers Association All-America Team
- 2017–WBCA Defensive Player of the Year
- 2017–AP All-American second team
- 2017–AAC Defensive Player of the Year
- 2017–NCAA Tournament - All Tournament Team

== Professional career ==
=== WNBA ===
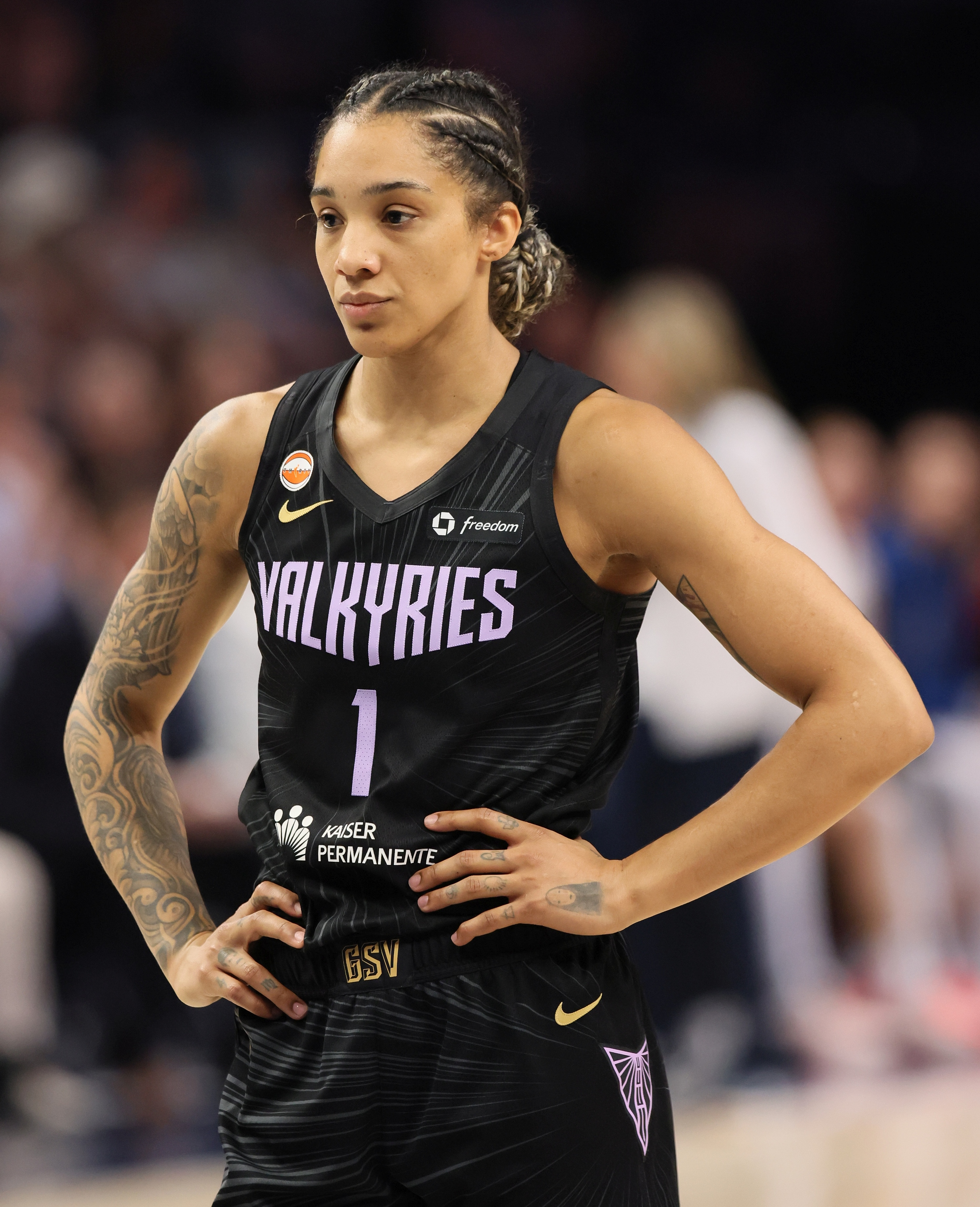
Williams with the Golden State Valkyries in 2026

Williams was selected fourth overall in the 2018 WNBA draft by the Chicago Sky.

On May 9, 2021, it was announced that Williams was traded to the Los Angeles Sparks. On February 3, 2022, Williams was acquired by the Seattle Storm in a trade that sent Katie Lou Samuelson, and the 9th overall pick in 2022 WNBA draft to the Sparks. Williams was a key piece for the 2022 Storm squad, starting in all 36 games during the regular season. However, after suffering a concussion while playing with LDLC ASVEL in France, she would miss a significant portion of the beginning of the 2023 season. After recovering, she signed a new, rest-of-season contract with the Storm in an announcement made on June 26, 2023. On August 8, 2023, in a match against the Connecticut Sun, Williams would suffer a left foot injury that would end her season. On April 12, 2026, it was announced that Williams had joined the Golden State Valkyries on a multi-year contract. During the 2026 regular season Williams averaged a career high 14.4 points per game and led the team in scoring. She was named an All-Star on the way to finishing second in Defensive Player of the Year voting and led the Valkyries to the second-best record in the WNBA at 32-12. In the 2026 WNBA postseason, Williams averaged 21 points, 4.2 rebounds, 3.3 assists, and 2.2 steals per game. The Valkyries reached the 2026 WNBA Finals where they faced the fourth-seeded Atlanta Dream. The series culminated in the first Finals Game 7 in WNBA history. In the game, Williams scored 28 of her game-high 30 points in the second-half, helping her team overcome a 9 point third-quarter deficit to secure the franchise's first WNBA Championship in just their second year of existence. Her Game 7 performance made her the first player ever to record at least 30 points, 4 blocks, and 2 steals in a WNBA Finals game. Her 28 second-half points set the WNBA record for most points scored in a single half in a postseason game. She finished the series averaging 19.6 points, 3.6 rebounds, 2.7 assists, and 2.6 steals per game and set a Finals record for most total steals with 18. Williams was awarded the 2026 WNBA Finals MVP for her performance.

=== European career ===
In 2018, Williams signed with Dike Basket Napoli of the Italian First Division. In January 2019, after week 14, her team withdrew from the championships. Williams signed to Spar CityLift Girona in late February 2019 to replace Shay Murphy, who left the team for family reasons and returned to the United States. With Girona, she won the 2018–19 Spanish First Division.

==== Sopron Basket ====
On May 15, 2020, Williams signed to Sopron Basket with former UConn teammate Megan Walker. On April 10, 2022, Williams won the 2021–22 EuroLeague Women championship with Sopron Basket, while being named Final Four MVP after the final.

==== ASVEL Féminin ====
On June 15, 2022, Williams signed to LDLC ASVEL. In 2023, she won the Eurocup as well as the French championship with ASVEL. Her second season at ASVEL (2023–24) was shadowed by an injury and the death of her father.

==== Fenerbahçe ====
Williams with the Fenerbahçe in 2026

Williams inked a deal with Fenerbahçe S.K. in July 2024.

=== Unrivaled ===
On June 18, 2026, the 3-on-3 basketball league Unrivaled announced it had signed Williams to a multiyear contract starting in the 2027 season.

== National team career ==
=== Olympics ===
==== Tokyo 2020 ====
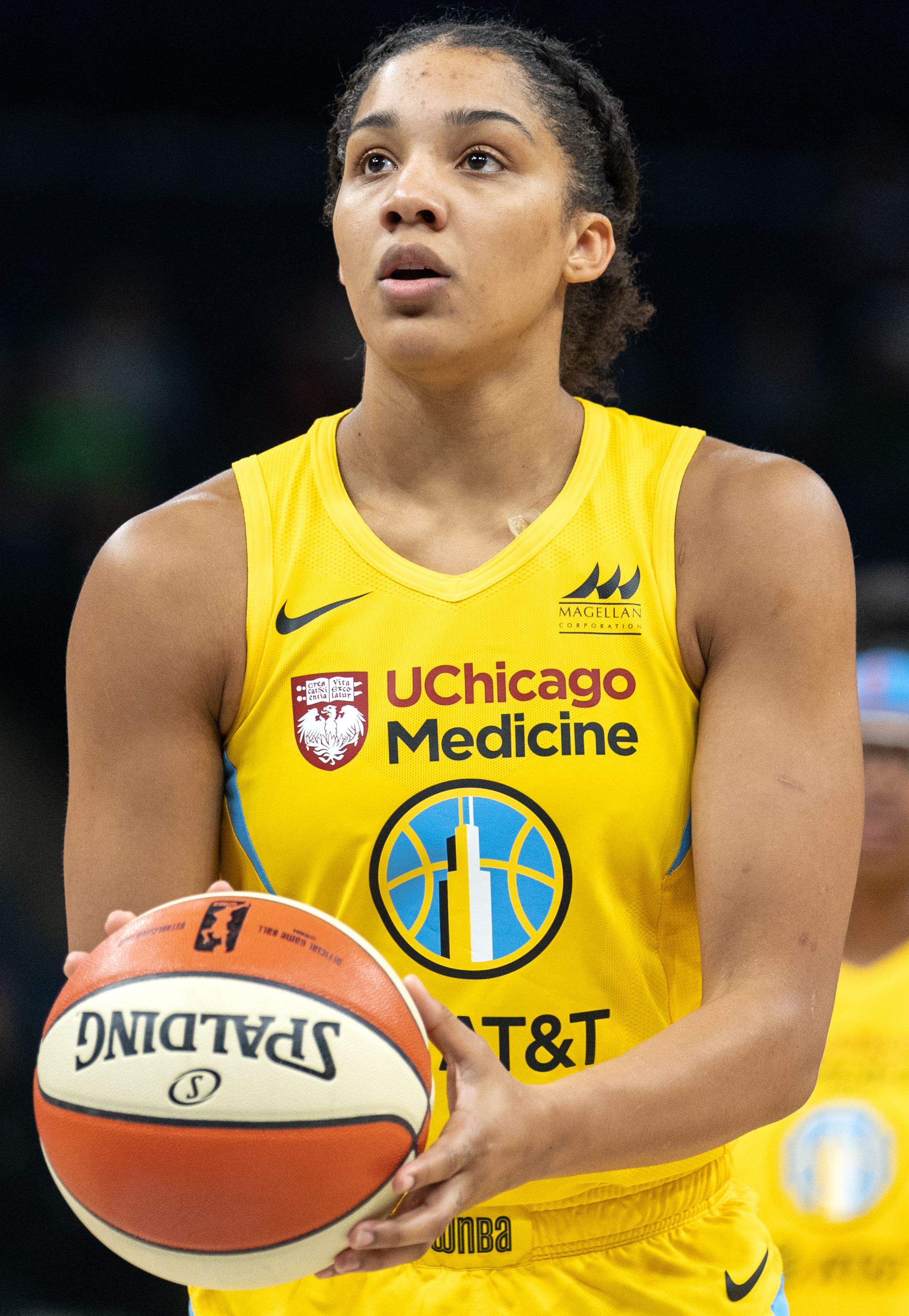
Williams attempting a free-throw in 2019 as a Chicago Sky

Although Williams was born and raised in the United States, her mother is French and Williams has dual citizenship with the US and France. Her Olympic experience was not her first experience with the French team, as she played for Les Bleues in the 2021 Eurobasket competition, helping the team to win silver. Williams averaged 8.2 points per game in that competition.

The decision to play for the Olympic team was not without cost. Many of the Olympic players, not just for the USA, but for several other teams, play in the WNBA, whose regular-season typically runs through the summer months. To accommodate the Olympics, the WNBA typically takes a month-long break in the season during Olympic years; however, Williams's commitments to the French national team interfered with her ability to show up at training camp for the Chicago Sky. She told ESPN's Michael Voepel that she thought she had reached an understanding with the team regarding her commitments, but the team disagreed, suspended her from the team and traded her to the Los Angeles Sparks. She was a member of the Sparks after the Olympics were over, but because she was suspended, she was ineligible to play during the season, so her decision to play for the French national team cost her an entire WNBA season.

In the opening game of the preliminary rounds, France faced Japan. France was ranked fifth in the world at the time while Japan was 10th, but Japan was playing in their home country, and they upset France 74–70. Williams played 31 minutes, more than any other player on her team. France was allocated to group B, which also included the USA and Nigeria. While France could advance even with a loss to the USA, they would not advance to the knockout stage if they lost to Nigeria, so they found themselves in a must win situation in just their second game. France "righted the ship .. against Nigeria", winning 87–62. Williams had 13 points and nine rebounds (tied for top on the team), just missing a double double. She also led the team in steals.

Williams warming up before a Valkyrie game against the Indiana Fever in 2026.

In the game against the United States, which had not lost an Olympic game since 1992, the Americans again prevailed, but France kept the game close, finally losing 93–82. Voepel noted that Williams was called a "Swiss Army knife" due to her versatility. She was the only member of the French team to record results in five statistical categories: points (10), rebounds (5), assists (3), steals (6), and blocks (1). In the knockout round, France faced Spain and just managed to come away with a win, 67-64. Williams was one of two French players with double-digit scoring, recording 11 points in 29 minutes. The semi-final match was against Japan, who had never won an Olympic medal, but was now playing for a chance to make it to the gold-medal game on their home territory. Japan won 87–71. Williams played a team-high 26 minutes and recorded eight rebounds, more than any other player on either team.

In the bronze medal game, France faced Serbia, who had beaten France for the Eurobasket championship less than two months earlier. Serbia started out strong, and led 23–19 at the end of the first quarter. France battled back, taking the lead with less than a minute left in the half. They never relinquished the lead and ended up winning by 15 points, 91–76. While Williams had played well up to this point, she saved her best for last, hitting four of her five three-point attempts, tying for the team lead in assists and the only player on her team to record a block and a steal in the game. She was the leading scorer for her team with 17 points.

==== Paris 2024 ====
Williams was again named to the French national team for the 2024 Olympics, winning a silver medal in the tournament. Heading into the final game against the USA, Williams averaged 14.8 points, 4.2 rebounds, 5.4 assists, and 2.8 steals in France's five Olympic games while shooting 49.2% from the field. She was the French team's leader in points, assists and steals for the Olympic tournament.

- ALL-STAR FIVE of Paris Olympics 2024 Women's Basketball
- Best Defensive Player of Paris Olympics 2024 Women's Basketball

==== 2026 FIBA Women's Basketball World Cup ====
On September 1, 2026, Williams was named captain of the French team for the 2026 FIBA Women's Basketball World Cup in Berlin.

- 2026 FIBA Women Basketball World Cup BEST DEFENSIVE PLAYER
- 2026 FIBA Women Basketball World Cup All star 5

== Personal life ==
As of 2026, Williams is in a relationship with New York Liberty guard and France teammate Marine Johannès, who has been described as her "longtime partner"; Williams has attended Johannès' games as a fan to support her.

== Career statistics ==
Legend
GP	Games played	GS	Games started	MPG	Minutes per game	RPG	Rebounds per game
APG	Assists per game	SPG	Steals per game	BPG	Blocks per game	PPG	Points per game
TO	Turnovers per game	FG%	Field-goal percentage	3P%	3-point field-goal percentage	FT%	Free-throw percentage
**Bold**	Career best	°	League leader

*	Denotes seasons in which Williams won an NCAA championship
†	Denotes seasons in which Williams won a national championship or WNBA championship

=== WNBA ===
==== Regular season ====
WNBA regular season statistics
Year	Team	GP	GS	MPG	FG%	3P%	FT%	RPG	APG	SPG	BPG	TO	PPG
2018	Chicago	34	30	23.0	.432	.269	.783	4.3	1.6	1.6	.2	**1.1**	7.3
2019	Chicago	33	2	16.0	.414	.171	.725	2.2	2.1	.7	.2	1.7	5.6
2020	Chicago	22	4	24.8	.424	.286	.640	4.0	2.0	1.3	.2	1.7	7.7
2021	Did not play (Olympic commitment)												
2022	Seattle	36	36	25.6	.444	.257	.778	**5.0**	3.1	1.5	.4	1.4	7.5
2023	Seattle	10	8	28.5	.362	.217	.846	3.6	3.8	1.5	.4	2.2	8.4
2024	Seattle	12	11	29.0	**.481**	.323	.737	4.0	3.7	1.7	.3	1.4	10.3
2025	Seattle	**44**	**44**	**31.6**	.422	**.350**	**.853**	4.3	**4.2**	**2.3**	**.5**	1.9	11.6
2026^{†}	Golden State	39	39	25.1	.404	.342	.736	3.3	2.2	1.6	.2	1.5	**14.4**
**Career**	8 years, 3 teams	230	174	25.1	.421	.296	.766	3.9	2.8	1.6	.3	1.6	9.3
**Career**	All-Star	2	1	23.4	.414	.348	1.000	2.5	5.5	1.0	.0	.5	17.0

==== Playoffs ====
WNBA playoff statistics
Year	Team	GP	GS	MPG	FG%	3P%	FT%	RPG	APG	SPG	BPG	TO	PPG
2019	Chicago	2	0	9.5	.250	.000	**1.000**	.5	3.0	2.0	.0	**.0**	3.0
2020	Chicago	1	0	32.0	.429	**.400**	**1.000**	5.0	2.0	2.0	.0	1.0	16.0
2022	Seattle	4	4	25.3	**.667**	.333	.857	4.0	2.8	1.5	.3	1.5	10.0
2024	Seattle	2	2	**37.0**	.452	.333	**1.000**	**6.5**	2.5	.5	**.5**	2.0	17.0
2025	Seattle	3	3	30.3	.481	.167	**1.000**	3.3	2.0	1.3	.0	2.0	9.7
2026^{†}	Golden State	**13**	**13**	32.8	.380	.330	.906	4.2	**3.3**	**2.2**	.4	1.8	**21**
**Career**	6 years, 3 teams	25	22	29.7	.413	.322	.913	4	2.9	1.8	.3	1.6	15.9

=== Overseas ===
==== National competition ====
===== Regular season =====
Season	Team	League	GP	GS	MPG	FG%	3P%	FT%	RPG	APG	SPG	BPG	TO	PPG
2018–19	Dike Basket Napoli	(Italy) LBF												
2018–19^{†}	Spar Girona	(Spain) LFB												
2019–20*	BLMA	(France) LFB	16	12	29.0	.496	.344	.658	5.9	2.0	2.1	.5	1.4	15.9
2020–21^{†}	Sopron Basket	(Hungary) NB I/A	18	17	23.2	.579	.390	.776	4.4	2.9	1.5	.4	.7	14.5
2021–22^{†}	Sopron Basket	(Hungary) NB I/A	15	14	23.8	.563	.321	.744	5.7	3.7	1.3	.4	1.9	12.7
2022–23	ASVEL	(France) LFB												

* 2019–20 LFB season interrupted after the 16th round due to COVID-19 pandemic

===== Playoffs =====
Season	Team	League	GP	GS	MPG	FG%	3P%	FT%	RPG	APG	SPG	BPG	TO	PPG
2018–19^{†}	Spar Girona	(Spain) LFB												
2019–20	BLMA	(France) LFB	LFB playoff canceled due to the COVID-19 pandemic											
2020–21^{†}	Sopron Basket	(Hungary) NB I/A												
2021–22^{†}	Sopron Basket	(Hungary) NB I/A												

=== College ===
NCAA statistics
Year	Team	GP	GS	MPG	FG%	3P%	FT%	RPG	APG	SPG	BPG	TO	PPG
2014–15*	UConn	**38**	0	15.6	**.637**	.000	.462	5.7	1.3	1.2	.4	**1.1**	8.3
2015–16*	UConn	**38**	12	18.6	.636	—	**.750**	5.6	1.3	1.9	.3	1.2	8.8
2016–17	UConn	37	**37**	**29.3**	.581	**.166**	.722	**8.3**	5.1	**2.7**	**1.4**	2.3	**14.3**
2017–18	UConn	36	36	26.8	.605	.000	.725	7.4	**5.3**	2.4	.7	2.3	11.2
**Career**		149	85	22.5	.610	.083	.658	6.8	3.2	2.0	.7	1.7	10.6
