= List of WNBA annual steals leaders =

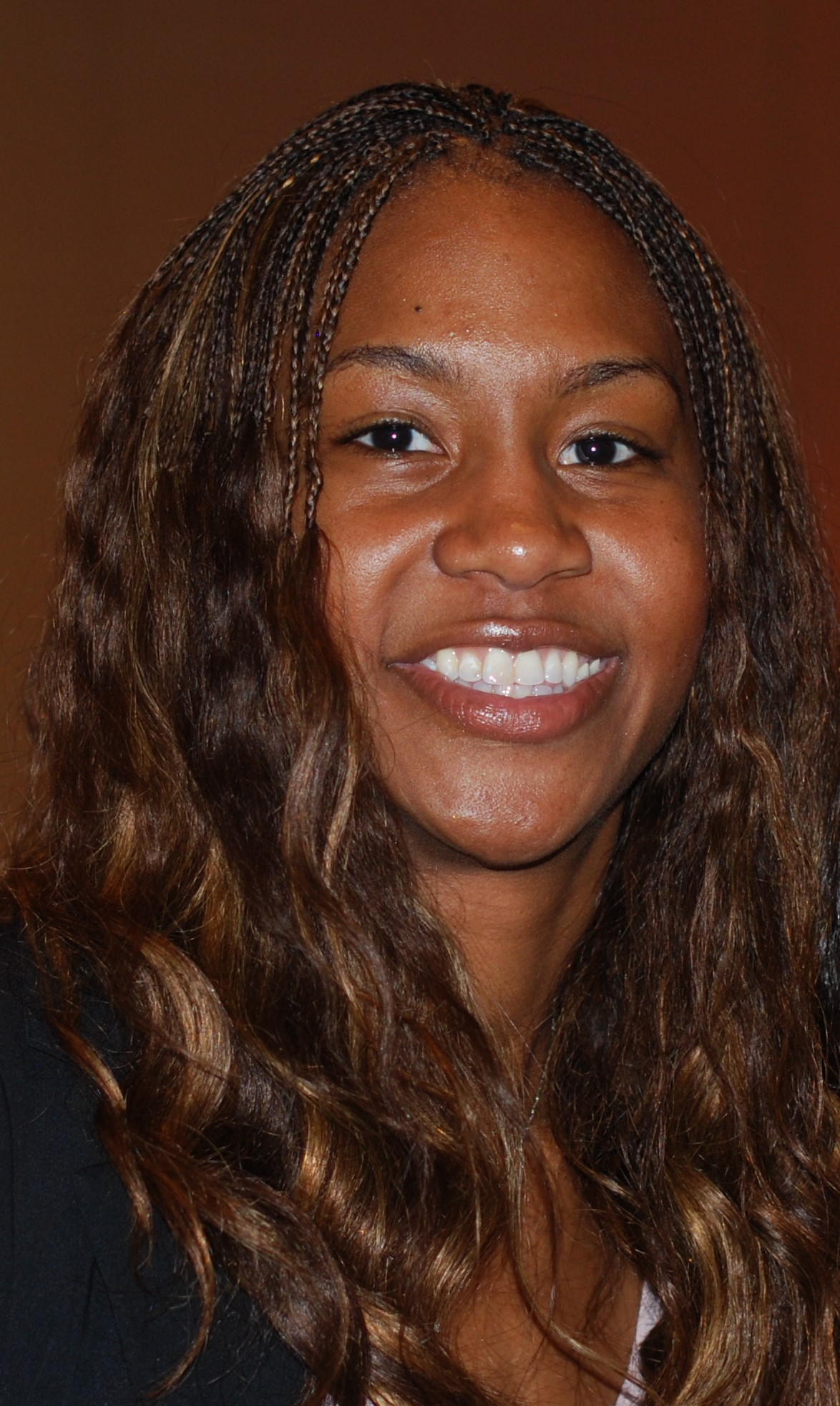
Tamika Catchings won eight steals titles the most in WNBA history

In basketball, a steal is a "defensive action" that causes the opponent to turn the ball over. The Women's National Basketball Association's (WNBA) steals title is awarded to the player with the highest steals per game (spg) average in a given season.

The highest league-leading steals per game was Teresa Weatherspoon's 3.33 steals per game in the 1998 season. The lowest league-leading steals per game was 2.21, achieved by Nykesha Sales and Yolanda Griffith in the 2004 season. Teresa Weatherspoon also holds the record for total steals in a season (100) in the 1998 season.

Tamika Catchings has won the most steals titles, with eight. Angel McCoughtry, Brittney Sykes, Jordin Canada, Sancho Lyttle, Sheryl Swoopes, Teresa Weatherspoon, and Yolanda Griffith have each won the steals title two times. Tamika Catchings also holds the record for consecutive seasons leading the league in steals with three, accomplishing this in the 2005 season, 2006 season, and the 2007 season. She accomplished this again two years in a row in the 2009 season, and the 2010 season. Other players that have led the league in steals in consecutive seasons include Brittney Sykes in the 2021 season, 2022 season, and Teresa Weatherspoon in the 1997 season, 1998 season.

== Key ==
^		Denotes player who is still active in the WNBA			
*		Inducted into the Naismith Memorial Basketball Hall of Fame			
†		Not yet eligible for Hall of Fame consideration (Note: A player is not eligible for induction into the Naismith Memorial Basketball Hall of Fame until she has been fully retired for two calendar years.)			
§		1st time eligible for Hall of Fame in 2025			
Player (X)		Denotes the number of times the player had been the assists leader up to and including that season			
G	Guard	F	Forward	C	Center

== Annual leaders ==
Year	Player	Pos.	Team	Games played	Total minutes	Minutes per game	Total steals	Steals per game
1997	Teresa Weatherspoon*	G	New York Liberty	28	924	33.0	85	3.0
1998	Teresa Weatherspoon (2)	G	New York Liberty*	30	1002	33.4	100	3.3
1999	Yolanda Griffith*	C/F	Sacramento Monarchs	29	979	33.8	73	2.5
2000	Sheryl Swoopes*	F/G	Houston Comets	31	1090	35.2	87	2.8
2001	Debbie Black	G	Miami Sol	32	946	29.6	82	2.5
2002	Tamika Catchings*	F	Indiana Fever	32	1167	36.5	94	2.9
2003	Sheryl Swoopes* (2)	F/G	Houston Comets	31	1084	35.0	77	2.4
2004	Yolanda Griffith* (2)	C/F	Sacramento Monarchs	34	1031	30.3	75	2.2
2004	Nykesha Sales	G/F	Connecticut Sun	34	1096	32.2	75	2.2
2005	Tamika Catchings* (2)	F	Indiana Fever	34	1174	34.5	90	2.6
2006	Tamika Catchings* (3)	F	Indiana Fever	32	1071	33.5	94	2.9
2007	Tamika Catchings* (4)	F	Indiana Fever	21	678	32.3	66	3.1
2008	Alexis Hornbuckle	G	Detroit Shock	34	747	22.0	79	2.3
2009	Tamika Catchings* (5)	F	Indiana Fever	34	1084	31.9	99	2.9
2010	Tamika Catchings* (6)	F	Indiana Fever	34	1068	31.4	77	2.2
2011	Sancho Lyttle	F	Atlanta Dream	22	577	26.2	52	2.3
2012	Angel McCoughtry	F	Atlanta Dream	24	718	29.9	60	2.5
2013	Tamika Catchings* (7)	F	Indiana Fever	30	942	31.4	85	2.8
2014	Angel McCoughtry (2)	F	Atlanta Dream	31	970	31.3	74	2.3
2015	Sancho Lyttle (2)	F	Atlanta Dream	24	721	30.0	54	2.2
2016	Tamika Catchings* (8)	F	Indiana Fever	34	844	24.8	62	1.8
2017	Alana Beard	F/G	Los Angeles Sparks	34	1048	30.8	71	2.0
2018	Maya Moore*	F/G	Minnesota Lynx	34	1081	31.8	57	1.7
2019	Jordin Canada^	G	Seattle Storm	30	865	28.8	68	2.3
2020	Alyssa Thomas^	F	Connecticut Sun	21	689	32.8	42	2.0
2021	Brittney Sykes^	G	Los Angeles Sparks	32	939	29.3	58	1.8
2022	Brittney Sykes^ (2)	G	Los Angeles Sparks	32	921	31.3	65	2.0
2023	Jordin Canada^ (2)	G	Los Angeles Sparks	38	1237	32.5	86	2.3
2024	Arike Ogunbowale^	G	Dallas Wings	38	1466	38.6	81	2.1
2025	Gabby Williams^	F	Seattle Storm	44	1391	31.6	99	2.3
2026	Rhyne Howard^	G	Atlanta Dream	43	1472	34.2	99	2.3

== Multiple-time leaders ==
Rank	Player	Team	Times leader	Years
1	Tamika Catchings	Indiana Fever	8	2002, 2005, 2006, 2007, 2009, 2010, 2013, 2016
2	Angel McCoughtry	Atlanta Dream	2	2012, 2014
2	Brittney Sykes	Los Angeles Sparks	2	2021, 2022
2	Jordin Canada	Seattle Storm (1) / Los Angeles Sparks (1)	2	2019, 2023
2	Sancho Lyttle	Atlanta Dream	2	2011, 2015
2	Sheryl Swoopes	Houston Comets	2	2000, 2003
2	Teresa Weatherspoon	New York Liberty	2	1997, 1998
2	Yolanda Griffith	Sacramento Monarchs	2	1999, 2004

== See also ==
- List of National Basketball Association career steals leaders
- List of National Basketball Association season steals leaders
