= 2018 NCAA Women's Basketball All-Americans =

An All-American team is an honorary sports team composed of the best amateur players of a specific season for each team position—who in turn are given the honorific "All-America" and typically referred to as "All-American athletes", or simply "All-Americans". Although the honorees generally do not compete together as a unit, the term is used in U.S. team sports to refer to players who are selected by members of the national media. Walter Camp selected the first All-America team in the early days of American football in 1889. The 2018 NCAA Women's Basketball All-Americans are honorary lists that will include All-American selections from the Associated Press (AP), the United States Basketball Writers Association (USBWA), and the Women's Basketball Coaches Association (WBCA) for the 2017–18 NCAA Division I women's basketball season. Both AP and USBWA choose three teams, while WBCA lists 10 honorees.

A consensus All-America team in women's basketball has never been organized. This differs from the practice in men's basketball, in which the NCAA uses a combination of selections by AP, USBWA, the National Association of Basketball Coaches (NABC), and the Sporting News to determine a consensus All-America team. The selection of a consensus All-America men's basketball team is possible because all four organizations select at least a first and second team, with only the USBWA not selecting a third team.

Before the 2017–18 season, it was impossible for a consensus women's All-America team to be determined because the AP had been the only body that divided its women's selections into separate teams. The USBWA first named separate teams in 2017–18. The women's counterpart to the NABC, the Women's Basketball Coaches Association (WBCA), continues the USBWA's former practice of selecting a single 10-member (plus ties) team. The Sporting News does not select an All-America team in women's basketball.

== By selector ==
=== Associated Press (AP) ===
First team		Second team		Third team	
Player	School	Player	School	Player	School
Asia Durr	Louisville	Kalani Brown	Baylor	Lexie Brown	Duke
Sabrina Ionescu	Oregon	Megan Gustafson	Iowa	Jordin Canada	UCLA
Katie Lou Samuelson	UConn	Kelsey Mitchell	Ohio State	Napheesa Collier	UConn
Victoria Vivians	Mississippi State	Arike Ogunbowale	Notre Dame	Myisha Hines-Allen	Louisville
A'ja Wilson	South Carolina	Gabby Williams	UConn	Teaira McCowan	Mississippi State

==== AP Honorable Mention ====
- Ariel Atkins, Texas
- Kenisha Bell, Minnesota
- Tashia Brown, Western Kentucky
- Natalie Butler, George Mason
- Bridget Carleton, Iowa State
- Chennedy Carter, Texas A&M
- Lauren Cox, Baylor
- Sophie Cunningham, Missouri
- Katelynn Flaherty, Michigan
- Loryn Goodwin, Oklahoma State
- Marie Gülich, Oregon State
- Ruthy Hebard, Oregon
- Kaylee Jensen, Oklahoma State
- Maria Jespersen, South Florida
- Brooke McCarty, Texas
- Brittany McPhee, Stanford
- Tinara Moore, Central Michigan
- Teana Muldrow, West Virginia
- Kia Nurse, UConn
- Jaime Nared, Tennessee
- Shakayla Thomas, Florida State
- Morgan William, Mississippi State
- Imani Wright, Florida State

=== United States Basketball Writers Association (USBWA) ===
First team		Second team	
Player	School	Player	School
Asia Durr	Louisville	Kalani Brown	Baylor
Sabrina Ionescu	Oregon	Jordin Canada	UCLA
Kelsey Mitchell	Ohio State	Megan Gustafson	Iowa
Katie Lou Samuelson	UConn	Arike Ogunbowale	UCLA
A'ja Wilson	South Carolina	Victoria Vivians	Mississippi State
		Gabby Williams	UConn

=== Women's Basketball Coaches Association (WBCA) ===
Player	School
Kalani Brown	Baylor
Asia Durr	Louisville
Sabrina Ionescu	Oregon
Teaira McCowan	Mississippi State
Kelsey Mitchell	Ohio State
Arike Ogunbowale	Notre Dame
Katie Lou Samuelson	UConn
Victoria Vivians	Mississippi State
Gabby Williams	UConn
A'ja Wilson	South Carolina

== By player ==
Player	School	Year	AP	USBWA	WBCA	Notes
Asia Durr	Louisville	Jr	1	1	1	18.8 ppg, 3.0 rpg, 2.1 apg, 42.5 3P%
Sabrina Ionescu	Oregon	So	1	1	1	19.4 ppg, 6.6 rpg, 7.8 apg, 43.7 3P%
Katie Lou Samuelson	UConn	Jr	1	1	1	17.9 ppg, 4.4 rpg, 3.7 apg, 53.1 FG%, 46.2 3P%
Victoria Vivians	Mississippi State	Sr	1	2	1	19.6 ppg, 6.0 rpg, 1.5 steals
A'ja Wilson	South Carolina	Sr	1	1	1	22.6 ppg, 11.8 rpg, 3.2 blocks, 55.0 FG%
Kalani Brown	Baylor	Jr	2	2	1	20.2 ppg, 10.1 rpg, 1.2 blocks, 66.3 FG%
Megan Gustafson	Iowa	Jr	2	2	–	25.6 ppg, 12.7 rpg, 2.1 blocks, 66.8 FG%
Kelsey Mitchell	Ohio State	Sr	2	1	1	24.5 ppg, 3.2 rpg, 4.2 apg, 40.8 3P%
Arike Ogunbowale	Notre Dame	Jr	2	2	1	20.2 ppg, 5.4 rpg, 2.8 apg, 1.6 steals
Gabby Williams	UConn	Sr	2	2	1	10.6 ppg, 7.5 rpg, 5.2 apg, 2.6 steals, 59.1 FG%
Lexie Brown	Duke	Sr	3	–	–	20.1 ppg, 4.5 rpg, 4.4 apg, 3.5 steals
Jordin Canada	UCLA	Sr	3	2	–	16.8 ppg, 3.5 rpg, 6.9 apg, 3.2 steals
Napheesa Collier	UConn	Jr	3	–	–	15.4 ppg, 7.5 rpg, 3.2 apg, 56.5 FG%
Myisha Hines-Allen	Louisville	Sr	3	–	–	13.9 ppg, 9.8 rpg, 2.1 apg, 53.1 FG%
Teaira McCowan	Mississippi State	Jr	3	–	1	17.7 ppg, 13.2 rpg, 2.0 blocks, 60.2 FG%
