= Jordin Canada =

American basketball player (born 1995)

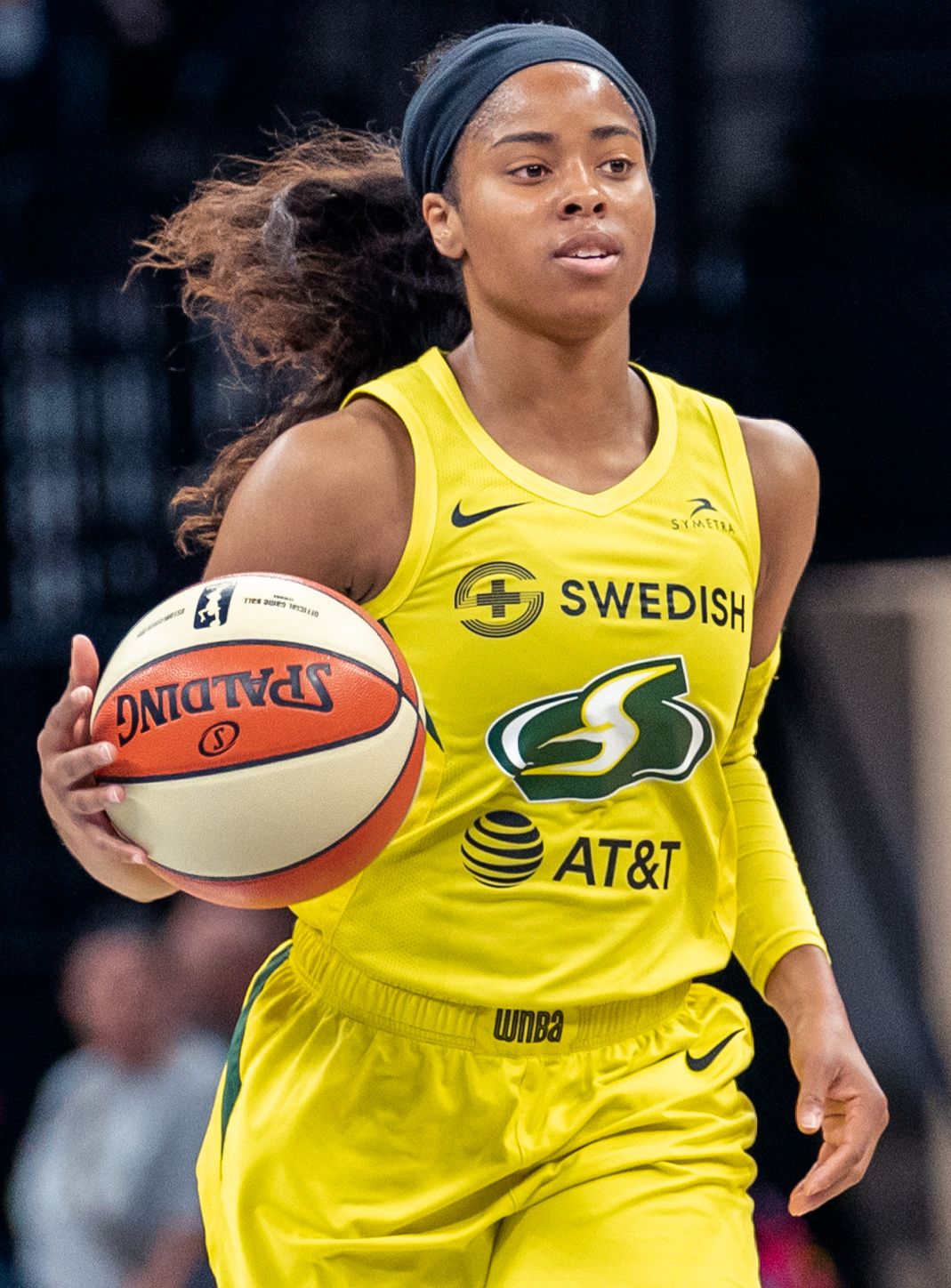
- Canada in 2019

No. 3 – Atlanta Dream
- Position: Point guard
- League: WNBA

Personal information
- Born: August 11, 1995 (age 31) Los Angeles, California, U.S.
- Listed height: 5 ft 6 in (1.68 m)
- Listed weight: 135 lb (61 kg)

Career information
- High school: Windward School (Los Angeles, California)
- College: UCLA (2014–2018)
- WNBA draft: 2018: 1st round, 5th overall pick
- Drafted by: Seattle Storm
- Playing career: 2018–present

Career history
- 2018–2021: Seattle Storm
- 2018–2019: Wisła Can-Pack Kraków
- 2020–2021: Hatay BB
- 2022–2023: Los Angeles Sparks
- 2023–2024: Melbourne Boomers
- 2023: Athletes Unlimited League
- 2024–present: Atlanta Dream
- 2025: Laces
- 2026–present: Vinyl

Career highlights
- 2× WNBA champion (2018, 2020); 2× WNBA steals leader (2019, 2023); 2× WNBA All-Defensive First Team (2019, 2023); WNBA All-Defensive Second Team (2026); Commissioner's Cup champion (2021); WNBL Most Valuable Player (2024); All-WNBL First Team (2024); Third-team All-American – AP (2018); All-American – USBWA (2018); Pac-12 Defensive Player of the Year (2018); 3× All Pac-12 (2016–2018); 3× All Pac-12 Defensive Team (2016–2018); Pac-12 Freshman of the Year (2015); Pac-12 All-Freshman Team (2015); McDonald's All-American (2014)
- Stats at WNBA.com
- Stats at Basketball Reference
Medals
Women's basketball
Representing the United States
Women's basketball
FIBA AmeriCup
Gold medal – first place	2019 Puerto Rico	Team
2015 Summer Universiade
Gold medal – first place	2015 Gwangju	Team
FIBA Americas Under-16 Championship
Gold medal – first place	2011 Mexico	Team

Jordin Elizabeth Canada (born August 11, 1995) is an American professional basketball player for the Atlanta Dream of the Women's National Basketball Association (WNBA) and for Vinyl of Unrivaled. She was selected by the Seattle Storm with the fifth overall pick in the 2018 WNBA draft. Born and raised in Los Angeles, Canada played collegiately with the UCLA Bruins. She is known for her playmaking, speed and crossover skills. In her rookie season with the Storm, she won her first WNBA championship as they swept the Washington Mystics. In 2020, after winning her second WNBA championship, she signed an endorsement deal with Air Jordan.

== Early life ==
Canada was born in Los Angeles, California, and attended Windward School, where she played for Vanessa Nygaard, a former WNBA player and coach in the USA Basketball program. She earned first-team All League, League MVP, and first-team All-CIF honors in all four years of high school, brought home the Los Angeles Times' All-Area MVP in 2013, and played in the McDonald's All-American Game as a senior in 2014.

== College career ==
Canada started as soon as she got to UCLA, notching a 15-point, 10-rebound double-double in her first career game. She went on to start 30 games in the 2014–15 season, reaching double figures 25 times leading the Bruins in assists per game. The Bruins missed the NCAA Tournament but earned a bid to the 2015 WNIT; UCLA won the tournament, which Canada scoring a career-high 31 points (half of the Bruins' scoring) in a 62–60 win in the finals against West Virginia. She earned tournament MVP honors, along with being named Pac-12 Freshman of the Year.

She started 34 games as a sophomore, finishing second in the Pac-12 in assists per game (5.7) and steals per game (2.3), and also led UCLA in minutes and scoring. Canada led UCLA in minutes and scoring, and the Bruins went 22–7 in the regular season, made the 2016 NCAA tournament as a No. 3 seed, and advanced to the Sweet Sixteen for the first time since 1999. She was named All-Pac-12 and earned a spot on the Pac-12 All-Defensive team, and was an AP All-American honorable mention.

As a junior, Canada continued to grow in to one of the best point guards in the country. She notched her first career triple-double with 11 points, 12 assists, and 10 rebounds against Southern on Nov. 18, 2016, and nearly did it again two days later, finishing with 19 points, 10 rebounds, and nine assists against Cal Poly. Canada scored in double-digits in all but one game in the season, and finished with two points/rebounds double-doubles and six points/assists double-doubles, including three straight in UCLA's run to the Sweet Sixteen in the 2017 NCAA tournament. She earned All-Pac-12, All-Pac-12 defensive, and AP All-American honorable mention honors, and was named Pac-12 Defensive Player of the Year.

Canada opened her senior season with another triple-double, logging 26 points, 10 assists, and 11 steals against San Jose State. Once again, she led the Bruins in scoring, assists, and minutes, and UCLA made its third straight NCAA Tournament, this time advancing to the Elite Eight, where it lost to eventual champions Mississippi State.

Canada finished her career first in UCLA history in assists (831) second in points (2,153), third in field goals made (768), second in free throws made (518), third in steals (347), and fifth in 20-point games (42). She holds three of the top five seasons for assists in UCLA history.

== Professional career ==
=== WNBA ===
The Seattle Storm took Canada with the fifth overall pick in the 2018 WNBA draft, making her Sue Bird's back-up at point guard. She played in 33 games in her rookie season, making two starts and averaging 5.7 points and 3.3 assists in 16.5 minutes per game. The Storm were championship contenders as they finished the season 26–8 with the number 1 seed, receiving a double bye to the semi-finals. In the semi-finals, the Storm defeated the Phoenix Mercury in a hard-fought five-game series to advance to the WNBA Finals. In the Finals, the Storm would win the championship after defeating the Washington Mystics in a three-game sweep, Canada had increased her offensive game off the bench during the postseason to contribute to the Storm's success of winning the 2018 WNBA championship.

With Bird needing to undergo season-ending knee surgery just before the 2019 season began, Canada found herself as Seattle's starting point guard in her second year. Starting in 29 games, her scoring jumped up to 9.8 points per game. She logged her first professional double-double on July 12, 2019 against the Dallas Wings, scoring 14 points and adding 12 assists. She finished the season second in the WNBA in assists and first in steals, earning a spot on the WNBA All-Defensive Team. The Storm finished as the number 6 seed with a 18–16 record being shorthanded with Sue Bird and Breanna Stewart sitting out the season due to injury. They would win the first round elimination game 84–74 against the Minnesota Lynx, but would lose the second round elimination to the Los Angeles Sparks by a score of 92–69.

In the 2020 season, Canada would revert to playing back-up point guard with Bird returning after knee surgery. The season was delayed and shortened to 22 games in a bubble at IMG Academy due to the COVID-19 pandemic. Canada started in 11 of 20 games played due to Bird's absence during the season dealing with her knee injury. With a fully loaded roster, the Storm finished 18–4 with the number 2 seed, receiving a double bye to the semi-finals. In the semi-finals, they would eliminate the Minnesota Lynx in a three-game sweep, advancing back to the Finals for the second time in three years. In the Finals, the Storm would sweep the Las Vegas Aces to win the championship, ending off their postseason undefeated and also earning Canada her second championship in her first three seasons.

In February 2022, Canada signed a contract with the Los Angeles Sparks.

On February 1, 2024, Canada was traded to the Atlanta Dream alongside the 12th pick in the 2024 WNBA draft in exchange for Aari McDonald and the 8th pick.

=== Overseas ===
In 2018, Canada signed with Wisła Can-Pack Kraków of the Polish League for the 2018-19 off-season. In December 2020, Canada signed with Hatay BB of the Turkish league for the 2020-21 off-season.

Canada was named WNBL Most Valuable Player playing for the Melbourne Boomers in the 2023–24 WNBL season.

=== Athletes Unlimited ===
Canada appeared in Athletes Unlimited Pro Basketball in 2023, finishing 6th on the season.

=== Unrivaled ===
On November 18, 2024, it was announced that Canada would appear and play in the inaugural 2025 season of Unrivaled, the women’s 3-on-3 basketball league founded by Napheesa Collier and Breanna Stewart. She played on Vinyl.

On November 5th, 2025, it was announced that Canada had been drafted by Laces BC.

== International career ==
Canada has been a part of USA Basketball since 2011, when she was part of the U16 National Team that won gold at the FIBA Americas U16 Championship. She won another gold medal at the 2015 World University Games, and helped the U23 National Team win the first-ever U24 Four Nations Tournament in 2017.

Canada was a part of the USA team that won the 2019 AmeriCup, leading the team with 5.3 assists per game and adding 7.2 points per game. After the AmeriCup, she was named to the USA National Team Pool.

== Career statistics ==
Legend
GP	Games played	GS	Games started	MPG	Minutes per game	RPG	Rebounds per game
APG	Assists per game	SPG	Steals per game	BPG	Blocks per game	PPG	Points per game
TO	Turnovers per game	FG%	Field-goal percentage	3P%	3-point field-goal percentage	FT%	Free-throw percentage
**Bold**	Career best	°	League leader

=== WNBA ===
†	Denotes seasons in which Canada won a WNBA championship

==== Regular season ====
WNBA regular season statistics
Year	Team	GP	GS	MPG	FG%	3P%	FT%	RPG	APG	SPG	BPG	TO	PPG
2018^{†}	Seattle	33	2	16.5	.357	.182	.738	1.5	3.3	.9	.0	1.7	5.7
2019	Seattle	30	29	28.8	.388	.186	.768	2.4	5.2	**2.3**	.2	2.6	9.8
2020^{†}	Seattle	20	11	24.2	.424	.091	.772	2.3	5.5	1.5	.0	2.0	7.9
2021	Seattle	29	3	18.7	.389	.214	.841	2.3	3.0	.7	.1	**1.1**	5.8
2022	Los Angeles	32	25	27.0	.384	.140	.806	2.3	5.5	1.4	.2	2.3	9.2
2023	Los Angeles	38	38	**32.6**	.404	**.333**	**.873**	3.1	6.0	**2.3**°	.2	2.7	**13.3**
2024	Atlanta	20	18	31.2	.390	.281	.781	**3.5**	5.8	1.6	**.3**	2.1	10.6
2025	Atlanta	28	26	28.0	.396	.291	.760	3.3	5.7	1.7	**.3**	2.2	11.2
2026	Atlanta	**43**	**43**	31.1	**.431**	.292	.782	**3.5**	**7.3**	1.9	**.3**	2.4	11.6
**Career**	9 years, 3 teams	273	195	26.7	.398	.262	.798	2.7	5.3	1.6	.2	2.2	9.6

==== Playoffs ====
WNBA playoff statistics
Year	Team	GP	GS	MPG	FG%	3P%	FT%	RPG	APG	SPG	BPG	TO	PPG
2018^{†}	Seattle	**8**	0	13.6	.477	.**364**	.600	1.1	2.3	.4	.0	1.5	6.1
2019	Seattle	2	2	**33.0**	.405	.200	.714	**3.5**	5.5	**1.0**	.0	2.0	**18.0**
2020^{†}	Seattle	6	0	15.5	**.545**	.000	.667	1.8	1.3	.5	.0	**.3**	7.0
2021	Seattle	1	0	10.0	.000	.000	**1.000**	.0	2.0	**1.0**	.0	3.0	6.0
2024	Atlanta	2	2	27.0	.417	.250	.000	1.0	**7.5**	.5	.0	3.5	5.5
2025	Atlanta	3	**3**	27.0	.379	.000	.286	2.3	6.7	**1.0**	**.3**	1.7	8.0
**Career**	6 years, 2 teams	22	7	18.8	.443	.231	.611	1.6	3.4	.6	.0	1.5	7.6

=== College ===
NCAA statistics
Season	College	GP	GS	MPG	FG%	3PT%	FT%	REB	AST	STL	BLK	Points	PPG
2014–15	UCLA	34	30	30.1	.376	.130	.775	116	148	69	**3**	402	11.8
2015–16	UCLA	34	34	34.2	.406	.262	.764	134	193	79	2	549	16.1
2016–17	UCLA	34	32	**34.5**	.434	.354	**.834**	**176**	242	85	2	**606**	**17.8**
2017–18	UCLA	**35**	**35**	33.7	**.435**	**.386**	.804	131	**248**	**114**	1	596	17.0
**Career**		137	131	33.1	.415	.332	.794	557	831	347	8	2153	15.7

== See also ==
- List of WNBA annual steals leaders
- List of WNBA career assists leaders
- List of WNBA career steals leaders
