= 2019 WNBA season =

- League: Women's National Basketball Association
- Sport: Basketball
- Duration: May 24 – October 10, 2019
- Games: 34
- Teams: 12
- Total attendance: 1,333,093
- Average attendance: 6,535
- TV partner(s): ABC, ESPN, ESPN2, NBA TV, CBSSN

Draft
- Top draft pick: (United States) Jackie Young
- Picked by: Las Vegas Aces

Regular season
- Top seed: Washington Mystics
- Season MVP: (United States) Elena Delle Donne (Washington)
- Top scorer: (United States) Brittney Griner (Phoenix)

Playoffs
- Finals champions: Washington Mystics
- Runners-up: Connecticut Sun
- Finals MVP: (Belgium) Emma Meesseman (Washington)

WNBA seasons
- ← 2018 2020 →

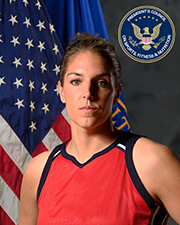
Elena Delle Donne, the 2019 regular season MVP

The 2019 WNBA season was the 23rd season of the Women's National Basketball Association (WNBA). The Seattle Storm were the defending champions. The regular season began on May 24, with the Atlanta Dream hosting the Dallas Wings and the New York Liberty hosting the Indiana Fever. The season ended with the Washington Mystics securing their first WNBA Title over the Connecticut Sun three games to two, in a closely contested finals. Emma Meesseman was named Finals MVP and teammate Elena Delle Donne was named regular season MVP.

== Draft ==
The Las Vegas Aces had the first pick in the 2019 WNBA draft on April 10, marking the third straight draft in which the franchise won the lottery for the top pick. With the top pick, the Aces selected Jackie Young from Notre Dame. The draft was televised nationally on the ESPN networks (Round 1 on ESPN2, Rounds 2 and 3 on ESPNU).

== Rule changes ==
The WNBA Board of Governors approved two rule changes at their November 15, 2018 meeting that would go into effect during the 2019 season.

1. The "Clear Path Foul Rule" was simplified to establish "bright line" standards based on a player's positioning.
2. The definition of a "Hostile Act" was expanded for purposes of instant replay.

== Media coverage ==
On April 22, 2019, CBS Sports Network announced a multi-year deal with the league to broadcast 40 games a season starting in May 2019. On June 27, 2019, TSN, Sportsnet, and NBA TV Canada announced a multi-year deal with the league to broadcast 53 games combined a season starting on June 28, 2019.

== Transactions ==
=== Retirement ===
- Lindsay Whalen announced her retirement on August 13, 2018 that she would retire at the conclusion of the 2018 season. Whalen played 15 seasons with the Connecticut Sun and Minnesota Lynx, winning four titles with the latter. She retired as the WNBA's all-time leader in games won, with 322.
- Noelle Quinn announced that she would retire on February 21. She joined the Seattle Storm as an assistant coach.
- Monique Currie announced her retirement via Instagram on February 26. Currie retired to pursue a career with Nike.
- Cappie Pondexter announced her retirement via Instagram on April 17. Pondexter was the 2007 WNBA Finals MVP and a two time WNBA champion.

=== Free agency ===
Free agency negotiations began on January 15, 2019, with the signing period starting on February 1, 2019.

=== Coaching changes ===
Off-season
| Team | 2018 season | 2019 season | Reference |
|---|---|---|---|
| Chicago Sky | Amber Stocks | James Wade | |
| Dallas Wings | Taj McWilliams-Franklin (Interim) | Brian Agler | |
| Los Angeles Sparks | Brian Agler | Derek Fisher | |
Postseason
| Indiana Fever | Pokey Chatman | | |
| New York Liberty | Katie Smith | | |

=== Administration ===
- On June 17, Cathy Engelbert became the first Commissioner of the WNBA (previous top administrators had been titled "President"). She had previously served as CEO of the U.S. member firm of the international professional services firm Deloitte.

== Arena changes ==
- On August 15, 2018 the Seattle Storm announced that they would play their regular season games at the University of Washington's Alaska Airlines Arena while Climate Pledge Arena undergoes renovations for the Seattle Kraken of the NHL. The Storm later announced that of the team's 17 regular-season home games, 12 would be held at Alaska Airlines Arena and the remainder at Angel of the Winds Arena in the northern suburb of Everett, Washington.
- On December 13, 2018 the Atlanta Dream announced that they would return to State Farm Arena, formerly Philips Arena, after playing the previous two seasons at Georgia Tech's McCamish Pavilion while State Farm Arena underwent a $192.5 million renovation.
- The Washington Mystics moved into the St. Elizabeths East Entertainment and Sports Arena beginning with the 2019 season. The arena's capacity is only 4,200, vastly smaller than the team's former home of Capital One Arena.
- On July 24, 2019, the Phoenix Mercury announced that they would play the 2020 season at Arizona Veterans Memorial Coliseum to accommodate renovations to Talking Stick Resort Arena. The Mercury plans to return to the latter venue upon project completion.
- On September 5, 2019, the Indiana Fever announced that they would move to Butler University's Hinkle Fieldhouse for the entire 2020 and 2021 seasons, plus part of the 2022 season. The move was made necessary by a previously announced project to renovate Bankers Life Fieldhouse, home to both the Fever and the NBA's Indiana Pacers, with most of the work taking place during Pacers offseasons. The Fever plan to return to Bankers Life Fieldhouse upon project completion.

== Regular season ==
=== All-Star Game ===
ABC, TSN5/SN1

July 27, 2019
3:30 p.m. ET

Report

Team Wilson 129, Team Delle Donne 126
Scoring by quarter: 39–23, 38–40, 28–32, 24–31
| Pts: Wheeler 25; Rebs: Fowles 9 Asts: Gray 10 | Pts: Ogwumike 22; Rebs: Jones 13; Asts: Toliver 9 |

Mandalay Bay Events Center, Las Vegas, Nevada
Attendance: 9,157
Referees:
#42 Roy Gulbeyan
#13 Cheryl Flores
#15 Fatou Cissoko-Stephens

=== Standings ===
| # | Eastern Conference | W | L | PCT | GB | Home | Road | Conf. |
|---|---|---|---|---|---|---|---|---|
| 1 | Washington Mystics (1) | 26 | 8 | .765 | – | 14–3 | 12–5 | 13–3 |
| 2 | Connecticut Sun (2) | 23 | 11 | .676 | 3 | 15–2 | 8–9 | 11–5 |
| 3 | Chicago Sky (5) | 20 | 14 | .588 | 6 | 12–5 | 8–9 | 11–5 |
| 4 | e –Indiana Fever | 13 | 21 | .382 | 13 | 7–10 | 6–11 | 7–9 |
| 5 | e –New York Liberty | 10 | 24 | .294 | 16 | 4–13 | 6–11 | 3–13 |
| 6 | e –Atlanta Dream | 8 | 26 | .235 | 18 | 5–12 | 3–14 | 3–13 |

| # | Western Conference | W | L | PCT | GB | Home | Road | Conf. |
|---|---|---|---|---|---|---|---|---|
| 1 | Los Angeles Sparks (3) | 22 | 12 | .647 | – | 15–2 | 7–10 | 10–6 |
| 2 | Las Vegas Aces (4) | 21 | 13 | .618 | 1 | 13–4 | 8–9 | 11–5 |
| 3 | Seattle Storm (6) | 18 | 16 | .529 | 4 | 11–6 | 7–10 | 10–6 |
| 4 | Minnesota Lynx (7) | 18 | 16 | .529 | 4 | 11–6 | 7–10 | 7–9 |
| 5 | Phoenix Mercury (8) | 15 | 19 | .441 | 7 | 9–8 | 6–11 | 5–11 |
| 6 | e – Dallas Wings | 10 | 24 | .294 | 12 | 8–9 | 2–15 | 5–11 |

Notes

(#) – Conference Standing, Playoff Seeds shown to the right of team name
e – Eliminated from playoffs

=== Statistical leaders ===
The following shows the leaders in each statistical category during the 2019 regular season.

| Category | Player | Team | Statistic |
|---|---|---|---|
| Points per game | Brittney Griner | Phoenix Mercury | 20.7 ppg |
| Rebounds per game | Jonquel Jones | Connecticut Sun | 9.7 rpg |
| Assists per game | Courtney Vandersloot | Chicago Sky | 9.1 apg |
| Steals per game | Jordin Canada | Seattle Storm | 2.3 spg |
| Blocks per game | Brittney Griner; Jonquel Jones | Phoenix Mercury; Connecticut Sun | 2.0 bpg |
| Field goal percentage | Sylvia Fowles | Minnesota Lynx | 58.8% |
| Three point FG percentage | Alysha Clark | Seattle Storm | 48.1% |
| Free throw percentage | Elena Delle Donne | Washington Mystics | 97.4% |
| Points per game (team) | Washington Mystics | | 89.3 ppg |
| Field goal percentage (team) | Washington Mystics | | 46.9% |

=== Schedule ===
2019 WNBA preseason
Preseason

| Date | Time (ET) | Matchup | | | TV | Result | High points | High rebounds | High assists | Location/Attendance |
|---|---|---|---|---|---|---|---|---|---|---|
| Wednesday, April 10 | 7:00 p.m. | 2019 WNBA draft: first round | | | ESPN2 | | | | | Nike New York Headquarters, New York City |
| Wednesday, April 10 | 8:00 p.m. | 2019 WNBA draft: second and third round | | | ESPNU | | | | | Nike New York Headquarters, New York City |
| Thursday, May 9 | 7:00 p.m. | China | @ | New York Liberty | ESPNews | 71–89 | Tied (19) | Warley-Talbert (8) | Tied (5) | Barclays Center; 4,115 |
| Friday, May 10 | 8:00 p.m. | Washington Mystics | @ | Minnesota Lynx | | 79–86 | Sims (20) | Fowles (11) | Sims (7) | Target Center; 3,201 |
| Saturday, May 11 | 10:00 p.m. | Los Angeles Sparks | @ | Phoenix Mercury | | 75–82 | Bonner (20) | Bonner (8) | Tied (5) | Talking Stick Resort Arena; 3,751 |
| Monday, May 13 | 5:00 p.m. | Atlanta Dream | vs. | Dallas Wings | | 82–59 | Bentley (15) | Gülich (6) | Tied (5) | Mohegan Sun Arena; 3,300 |
| Monday, May 13 | 7:00 p.m. | New York Liberty | @ | Connecticut Sun | | 66–100 | J. Jones (19) | J. Thomas (7) | C. Williams (7) | Mohegan Sun Arena; 3,806 |
| Tuesday, May 14 | 12:00 p.m. | Indiana Fever | @ | Chicago Sky | | 69–58 | Tied (11) | McCowan (8) | Vandersloot (6) | Wintrust Arena; 4,033 |
| Tuesday, May 14 | 5:00 p.m. | Atlanta Dream | vs. | New York Liberty | | 92–87 | Zahui B. (20) | Zahui B. (8) | 4 tied (4) | Mohegan Sun Arena; 3,458 |
| Tuesday, May 14 | 7:00 p.m. | Dallas Wings | @ | Connecticut Sun | | 71–67 | Ogunbowale (19) | J. Jones (14) | Stricklen (4) | Mohegan Sun Arena; 3,965 |
| Wednesday, May 15 | 10:00 p.m. | Phoenix Mercury | @ | Seattle Storm | | 87–84 | 4 tied (15) | Tied (7) | Canada (5) | Angel of the Winds Arena; 3,076 |
| Thursday, May 16 | 12:00 p.m. | Chicago Sky | @ | Indiana Fever | | 65–76 | Parker (16) | Tied (7) | Wheeler (8) | Bankers Life Fieldhouse; 3,794 |
| Friday, May 17 | 7:00 p.m. | Washington Mystics | @ | Atlanta Dream | | 75–64 | Walker-Kimbrough (18) | Billings (6) | Montgomery (4) | Albany Civic Center |
| Friday, May 17 | 10:30 p.m. | Seattle Storm | @ | Los Angeles Sparks | | 85–92 | Tied (18) | Russell (9) | Tied (6) | Hutto-Patterson Gym |
| Sunday, May 19 | 2:30 p.m. | Connecticut Sun | @ | New York Liberty | | 98–79 | Nurse (25) | Charles (6) | C. Williams (6) | Times Union Center |
| Sunday, May 19 | 3:00 p.m. | Indiana Fever | @ | Dallas Wings | | 71–66 | K. Mitchell (26) | McCowan (6) | Johnson (6) | College Park Center; 3,428 |
| Sunday, May 19 | 3:30 p.m. | Minnesota Lynx | @ | Las Vegas Aces | | 79–75 | Sims (25) | Swords (8) | Brown (7) | Cox Pavilion |

2019 WNBA regular season
May

| Date | Time (ET) | Matchup | | | TV | Result | High points | High rebounds | High assists | Location/Attendance |
|---|---|---|---|---|---|---|---|---|---|---|
| Friday, May 24 | 7:30 p.m. | Dallas Wings | @ | Atlanta Dream | | 72–76 | Breland (17) | Johnson (9) | McCarty-Williams (8) | State Farm Arena; 3,070 |
| Friday, May 24 | 7:30 p.m. | Indiana Fever | @ | New York Liberty | NBA TV | 81–80 | Charles (32) | Charles (12) | Wheeler (5) | Westchester County Center; 1,965 |
| Saturday, May 25 | 3:30 p.m. | Phoenix Mercury | @ | Seattle Storm | ABC | 68–77 | Bonner (31) | Howard (16) | Canada (6) | Angel of the Winds Arena; 8,500 |
| Saturday, May 25 | 7:30 p.m. | Washington Mystics | @ | Connecticut Sun | Twitter | 69–84 | A. Thomas (23) | J. Jones (14) | Cloud (8) | Mohegan Sun Arena; 7,913 |
| Saturday, May 25 | 8:00 p.m. | Chicago Sky | @ | Minnesota Lynx | | 71–89 | Collier (27) | Shepard (13) | Vandersloot (8) | Target Center; 8,524 |
| Sunday, May 26 | 8:00 p.m. | Los Angeles Sparks | @ | Las Vegas Aces | Twitter | 70–83 | Vadeeva (24) | Hamby (14) | Plum (6) | Mandalay Bay Events Center; 7,249 |
| Tuesday, May 28 | 7:00 p.m. | Indiana Fever | @ | Connecticut Sun | CBSSN, NESN+ | 77–88 | Wheeler (26) | A. Thomas (10) | Wheeler (9) | Mohegan Sun Arena; 4,781 |
| Wednesday, May 29 | 8:00 p.m. | Seattle Storm | @ | Minnesota Lynx | CBSSN, Fox Sports Go | 61–72 | Howard (18) | Fowles (13) | Sims (5) | Target Center; 8,092 |
| Friday, May 31 | 7:30 p.m. | Seattle Storm | @ | Atlanta Dream | CBSSN | 82–66 | Howard (19) | Howard (14) | Canada (7) | State Farm Arena; 2,119 |
| Friday, May 31 | 10:00 p.m. | Las Vegas Aces | @ | Phoenix Mercury | ESPN2 | 84–86 | Carson (20) | Bonner (12) | Y. Turner (10) | Talking Stick Resort Arena; 14,090 |
| Friday, May 31 | 10:30 p.m. | Connecticut Sun | @ | Los Angeles Sparks | NESN+, ESPN3, Spectrum Sports Net | 70–77 | C. Ogwumike (20) | J. Jones (22) | Tied (4) | Staples Center; 12,334 |

June

| Date | Time (ET) | Matchup | | | TV | Result | High points | High rebounds | High assists | Location/Attendance |
|---|---|---|---|---|---|---|---|---|---|---|
| Saturday, June 1 | 7:00 p.m. | New York Liberty | @ | Indiana Fever | | 77–92 | K. Mitchell (23) | R. Gray (9) | Tied (6) | Bankers Life Fieldhouse; 5,003 |
| Saturday, June 1 | 7:00 p.m. | Atlanta Dream | @ | Washington Mystics | | 75–96 | Atkins (21) | Hines-Allen (8) | Toliver (5) | St. Elizabeths East Arena; 4,200 |
| Saturday, June 1 | 8:00 p.m. | Seattle Storm | @ | Chicago Sky | | 79–83 | Quigley (25) | Howard (9) | Vandersloot (11) | Wintrust Arena; 7,063 |
| Saturday, June 1 | 8:00 p.m. | Minnesota Lynx | @ | Dallas Wings | | 70–67 | Dantas (20) | Fowels (12) | Sims (5) | College Park Center; 6,535 |
| Sunday, June 2 | 7:00 p.m. | Connecticut Sun | @ | Las Vegas Aces | League Pass, MYLVTV, NESN | 80–74 | Tied (19) | J. Jones (13) | 3 tied (5) | Mandalay Bay Events Center; 2,747 |
| Tuesday, June 4 | 11:00 a.m. | Los Angeles Sparks | @ | New York Liberty | League Pass, YES, Spectrum Sportsnet | 78–79 | C. Gray (29) | Charles (14) | Boyd (6) | Westchester County Center; 3,579 |
| Tuesday, June 4 | 10:00 p.m. | Minnesota Lynx | @ | Seattle Storm | Twitter, JoeTV | 77–84 | Loyd (19) | Howard (6) | Canada (7) | Angel of the Winds Arena; 5,711 |
| Wednesday, June 5 | 7:00 p.m. | Chicago Sky | @ | Washington Mystics | CBSSN, NBC Sports Washington | 85–103 | DeShields (24) | Delle Donne (7) | Vandersloot (8) | St. Elizabeths East Arena; 2,347 |
| Thursday, June 6 | 7:00 p.m. | Las Vegas Aces | @ | Atlanta Dream | CBSSN | 92–69 | 3 tied (15) | Breland (9) | J. Young (8) | State Farm Arena; 2,630 |
| Thursday, June 6 | 7:00 p.m. | Los Angeles Sparks | @ | Connecticut Sun | League Pass, NESN+, Spectrum Sportsnet | 77–89 | N. Ogwumike (21) | A. Thomas (12) | Tied (6) | Mohegan Sun Arena; 5,496 |
| Thursday, June 6 | 8:00 p.m. | Phoenix Mercury | @ | Minnesota Lynx | League Pass, Fox Sports North Plus, Fox Sports Arizona | 56–58 | Bonner (25) | Bonner (8) | Tied (3) | Target Center; 8,001 |
| Friday, June 7 | 7:00 p.m. | Dallas Wings | @ | Indiana Fever | CBSSN | 64–79 | Harrison (18) | Tied (11) | Wheeler (9) | Bankers Life Fieldhouse; 3,671 |
| Friday, June 7 | 7:30 p.m. | Washington Mystics | @ | New York Liberty | League Pass, Fox Sports Go, Monumental | 94–85 | Charles (27) | Delle Donne (8) | Cloud (8) | Westchester County Center; 1,567 |
| Saturday, June 8 | 3:30 p.m. | Los Angeles Sparks | @ | Minnesota Lynx | ABC | 89–85 | R. Williams (25) | Fowles (13) | Sims (7) | Target Center; 8,834 |
| Sunday, June 9 | 3:00 p.m. | Connecticut Sun | @ | Atlanta Dream | League Pass, WSB Now, WTIC | 69–59 | J. Jones (17) | J. Jones (13) | J. Thomas (6) | State Farm Arena; 3,082 |
| Sunday, June 9 | 3:00 p.m. | Las Vegas Aces | @ | New York Liberty | League Pass, Fox Sports Go | 77–88 | McBride (25) | Cambage (10) | Hartley (6) | Westchester County Center; 1,447 |
| Sunday, June 9 | 3:00 p.m. | Dallas Wings | @ | Washington Mystics | League Pass, NBC Sports Washington | 62–86 | Hawkins (21) | Tied (9) | Toliver (6) | St. Elizabeths East Arena; 3,564 |
| Sunday, June 9 | 4:00 p.m. | Phoenix Mercury | @ | Indiana Fever | NBA TV, Fox Sports Indiana, FSAZ+ | 94–87 | Tied (26) | Tied (7) | Tied (6) | Bankers Life Fieldhouse; 3,336 |
| Sunday, June 9 | 6:00 p.m. | Seattle Storm | @ | Chicago Sky | NBA TV, The U Too | 71–78 | Tied (20) | Parker (11) | Vandersloot (7) | Wintrust Arena; 5,032 |
| Tuesday, June 11 | 7:00 p.m. | Washington Mystics | @ | Connecticut Sun | CBSSN, NESN+, Monumental | 75–83 | J. Jones (24) | A. Thomas (9) | Cloud (8) | Mohegan Sun Arena; 5,224 |
| Tuesday, June 11 | 7:00 p.m. | Seattle Storm | @ | Indiana Fever | Twitter | 84–82 | Howard (26) | Dupree (15) | K. Mitchell (7) | Bankers Life Fieldhouse; 3,506 |
| Tuesday, June 11 | 8:00 p.m. | Phoenix Mercury | @ | Chicago Sky | League Pass, The U Too | 75–82 | Bonner (28) | Bonner (12) | Vandersloot (8) | Wintrust Arena; 4,212 |
| Wednesday, June 12 | 7:00 p.m. | Minnesota Lynx | @ | New York Liberty | League Pass, YES | 69–75 | Nurse (26) | Zahui B. (7) | Tied (7) | Westchester County Center; 1,181 |
| Thursday, June 13 | 8:00 p.m. | Indiana Fever | @ | Dallas Wings | CBSSN | 76–72 | Dupree (20) | Laney (11) | T. Mitchell (5) | College Park Center; 3,562 |
| Friday, June 14 | 7:00 p.m. | Seattle Storm | @ | Washington Mystics | CBSSN, NBC Sports Washington | 74–71 | Tied (19) | Tied (11) | Tied (5) | St. Elizabeths East Arena; 3,654 |
| Friday, June 14 | 8:00 p.m. | Connecticut Sun | @ | Minnesota Lynx | League Pass, Fox Sports Go, NESN+ | 85–81 | Sims (25) | J. Jones (12) | C. Williams (6) | Target Center; 8,803 |
| Friday, June 14 | 10:00 p.m. | Los Angeles Sparks | @ | Phoenix Mercury | CBSSN | 85–68 | Griner (24) | Griner (13) | C. Gray (9) | Talking Stick Resort Arena; 10,381 |
| Friday, June 14 | 10:30 p.m. | New York Liberty | @ | Las Vegas Aces | League Pass, MYLVTB | 65–100 | Plum (19) | Wilson (8) | J. Young (8) | Mandalay Bay Events Center; 4,110 |
| Saturday, June 15 | 7:00 p.m. | Chicago Sky | @ | Indiana Fever | League Pass, Fox Sports Indiana, The U Too | 70–64 | Quigley (18) | Parker (10) | Tied (8) | Bankers Life Fieldhouse; 4,715 |
| Saturday, June 15 | 8:00 p.m. | Atlanta Dream | @ | Dallas Wings | NBA TV, Fox Sports Southwest Plus | 61–71 | Ogunbowale (17) | Tied (8) | Johnson (4) | College Park Center; 5,220 |
| Saturday, June 15 | 10:00 p.m. | New York Liberty | @ | Los Angeles Sparks | NBA TV, Spectrum Sportsnet | 98–92 | Zahui B. (37) | C. Ogwumike (14) | Boyd (12) | Staples Center; 11,388 |
| Sunday, June 16 | 3:30 p.m. | Seattle Storm | @ | Connecticut Sun | ABC | 81–67 | Tied (20) | J. Jones (11) | J. Jones (6) | Mohegan Sun Arena; 7,773 |
| Sunday, June 16 | 7:00 p.m. | Las Vegas Aces | @ | Minnesota Lynx | NBA TV, Fox Sports Go | 80–75 | Tied (22) | Tied (9) | Dantas (6) | Target Center; 8,392 |
| Tuesday, June 18 | 10:30 p.m. | Washington Mystics | @ | Los Angeles Sparks | CBSSN, Spectrum Sportsnet, Monumental | 81–52 | Atkins (22) | Delle Donne (15) | Toliver (9) | Staples Center; 9,537 |
| Wednesday, June 19 | 11:00 a.m. | Indiana Fever | @ | Atlanta Dream | Twitter, Bounce TV | 88–78 | Hayes (28) | McCowan (14) | Montgomery (9) | State Farm Arena; 6,474 |
| Wednesday, June 19 | 7:00 p.m. | Chicago Sky | @ | New York Liberty | League Pass, YES, The U Too | 91–83 | Vandersloot (25) | Zahui B. (10) | Boyd (7) | Westchester County Center; 1,585 |
| Thursday, June 20 | 8:00 p.m. | Phoenix Mercury | @ | Dallas Wings | CBSSN | 54–69 | Thornton (18) | Tied (11) | 3 tied (3) | College Park Center; 4,626 |
| Thursday, June 20 | 10:00 p.m. | Washington Mystics | @ | Las Vegas Aces | CBSSN, MyLVTV, Monumental | 95–72 | Delle Donne (29) | Delle Donne (11) | Cloud (7) | Mandalay Bay Events Center; 4,416 |
| Friday, June 21 | 7:30 p.m. | Atlanta Dream | @ | Connecticut Sun | League Pass, NESN+, WSB Now | 76–86 | Stricklen (24) | Tied (8) | J. Thomas (9) | Mohegan Sun Arena; 6,608 |
| Friday, June 21 | 8:00 p.m. | Indiana Fever | @ | Chicago Sky | League Pass, The U Too | 76–69 | Wheeler (28) | McCowan (13) | Wheeler (8) | Wintrust Arena; 4,945 |
| Friday, June 21 | 10:00 p.m. | Los Angeles Sparks | @ | Seattle Storm | CBSSN, JoeTV, Spectrum SportsNet | 62–84 | Loyd (23) | Clark (10) | 3 tied (3) | Angel of the Winds Arena; 6,114 |
| Saturday, June 22 | 8:00 p.m. | New York Liberty | @ | Minnesota Lynx | NBA TV, Fox Sports North | 83–92 | Nurse (24) | Fowles (10) | Boyd (8) | Target Center; 8,600 |
| Saturday, June 22 | 10:30 p.m. | Dallas Wings | @ | Las Vegas Aces | League Pass, MyLVTV | 68–86 | Hamby (27) | Thornton (10) | J. Young (8) | Mandalay Bay Events Center; 4,347 |
| Sunday, June 23 | 1:00 p.m. | Washington Mystics | @ | Atlanta Dream | ESPN | 89–73 | Delle Donne (21) | Billings (14) | Tied (6) | State Farm Arena; 4,136 |
| Sunday, June 23 | 6:00 p.m. | Connecticut Sun | @ | Chicago Sky | NBA TV, The U Too, NESN | 75–93 | Parker (22) | Lavender (13) | Tied (7) | Wintrust Arena; 5,607 |
| Sunday, June 23 | 6:00 p.m. | Los Angeles Sparks | @ | Phoenix Mercury | League Pass, Fox Sports Arizona+ | 72–82 | Mitchell (22) | N. Ogwumike (14) | C. Gray (7) | Talking Stick Resort Arena; 10,132 |
| Sunday, June 23 | 7:00 p.m. | Indiana Fever | @ | Seattle Storm | League Pass, JoeTV | 61–65 | Loyd (21) | McCowan (13) | Tied (4) | Alaska Airlines Arena; 7,211 |
| Tuesday, June 25 | 7:00 p.m. | Minnesota Lynx | @ | Indiana Fever | CBSSN | 78–74 | Sims (25) | Fowles (11) | Sims (7) | Bankers Life Fieldhouse; 4,692 |
| Tuesday, June 25 | 10:00 p.m. | Seattle Storm | @ | Las Vegas Aces | Twitter, MyLVTV | 56–60 | Tied (14) | Cambage (13) | Colson (4) | Mandalay Bay Events Center; 4,215 |
| Wednesday, June 26 | 12:00 p.m. | Washington Mystics | @ | Chicago Sky | NBA TV, Monumental | 81–74 | Delle Donne (22) | DeShields (9) | Vandersloot (8) | Wintrust Arena; 8,914 |
| Wednesday, June 26 | 8:00 p.m. | Connecticut Sun | @ | Dallas Wings | NBA TV, Fox Sports Southwest+, NESN | 73–74 | A. Thomas (28) | Tied (7) | J. Thomas (11) | College Park Center; 4,017 |
| Thursday, June 27 | 10:30 p.m. | Las Vegas Aces | @ | Los Angeles Sparks | CBSSN, Spectrum SportsNet | 74–86 | 4 tied (18) | Tied (10) | J. Young (9) | Staples Center; 10,295 |
| Friday, June 28 | 7:30 p.m. | Dallas Wings | @ | New York Liberty | USA: League Pass, YES; Canada: SN1 | 68–69 | Thornton (20) | R. Gray (11) | Boyd (7) | Westchester County Center; 2,191 |
| Friday, June 28 | 10:00 p.m. | Indiana Fever | @ | Phoenix Mercury | CBSSN | 69–91 | Griner (23) | McCowan (10) | Mitchell (11) | Talking Stick Resort Arena; 9,435 |
| Friday, June 28 | 10:00 p.m. | Chicago Sky | @ | Seattle Storm | USA: NBA TV, JoeTV, The U Too; Canada: TSN2 | 76–79 | DeShields (19) | Lavender (10) | Vandersloot (6) | Alaska Airlines Arena; 7,915 |
| Saturday, June 29 | 2:00 p.m. | Connecticut Sun | @ | Washington Mystics | USA: ESPN; Canada: NBA TV Canada | 59–102 | Delle Donne (19) | Delle Donne (10) | Cloud (6) | St. Elizabeths East Arena; 4,200 |
| Saturday, June 29 | 10:30 p.m. | Indiana Fever | @ | Las Vegas Aces | CBSSN, MyLVTV | 97–102 (OT) | Wilson (39) | Wilson (11) | J. Young (11) | Mandalay Bay Events Center; 4,581 |
| Sunday, June 30 | 3:00 p.m. | New York Liberty | @ | Atlanta Dream | League Pass, WSB Now | 74–58 | Charles (24) | R. Gray (15) | 5 tied (4) | State Farm Arena; 4,359 |
| Sunday, June 30 | 4:00 p.m. | Minnesota Lynx | @ | Dallas Wings | League Pass, Fox Sports Southwest+, Fox Sports North+ | 86–89 | Sims (23) | Plaisance (10) | Sims (8) | College Park Center; 4,521 |
| Sunday, June 30 | 5:00 p.m. | Chicago Sky | @ | Los Angeles Sparks | League Pass, Spectrum SportsNet | 69–94 | DeShields (23) | Parker (11) | Vandersloot (7) | Staples Center; 11,067 |
| Sunday, June 30 | 7:00 p.m. | Phoenix Mercury | @ | Seattle Storm | League Pass, JoeTV | 69–67 | Tied (20) | Tied (7) | Whitcomb (5) | Alaska Airlines Arena; 8,002 |

July

| Date | Time (ET) | Matchup | | | TV | Result | High points | High rebounds | High assists | Location/Attendance |
|---|---|---|---|---|---|---|---|---|---|---|
| Tuesday, July 2 | 3:00 p.m. | Chicago Sky | @ | Las Vegas Aces | Twitter, MYLVTV | 82–90 | Quigley (18) | Cambage (9) | Vandersloot (12) | Mandalay Bay Events Center; 3,516 |
| Tuesday, July 2 | 8:00 p.m. | Atlanta Dream | @ | Minnesota Lynx | CBSSN, Fox Sports Go | 68–85 | Tablot (24) | Collier (11) | Sims (8) | Target Center; 8,208 |
| Wednesday, July 3 | 3:00 p.m. | New York Liberty | @ | Seattle Storm | League Pass, JoeTV, WSB Now | 84–83 | Charles (26) | Clark (9) | Boyd (10) | Alaska Airlines Arena; 8,710 |
| Friday, July 5 | 8:00 p.m. | Indiana Fever | @ | Dallas Wings | CBSSN | 76–56 | T. Mitchell (16) | McCowan (12) | Wheeler (7) | College Park Center; 5,093 |
| Friday, July 5 | 10:00 p.m. | New York Liberty | @ | Phoenix Mercury | CBSSN | 80–76 | Nurse (26) | Charles (12) | Boyd (6) | Talking Stick Resort Arena; 9,560 |
| Friday, July 5 | 10:00 p.m. | Atlanta Dream | @ | Seattle Storm | League Pass, JoeTV, WSB Now | 77–66 | Hayes (21) | Tied (9) | 3 tied (5) | Alaska Airlines Arena; 8,111 |
| Friday, July 5 | 10:30 p.m. | Washington Mystics | @ | Las Vegas Aces | League Pass, MYLVTV, Monumental | 99–70 | Delle Donne (21) | Sanders (7) | Cloud (9) | Mandalay Bay Events Center; 5,024 |
| Saturday, July 6 | 2:00 p.m. | Minnesota Lynx | @ | Connecticut Sun | USA: ESPN2; Canada: TSN5 | 74–71 | Sims (21) | Fowles (11) | Sims (8) | Mohegan Sun Arena; 8,076 |
| Sunday, July 7 | 3:00 p.m. | Las Vegas Aces | @ | New York Liberty | League Pass, Fox Sports Go | 90–58 | McBride (24) | Cambage (11) | Plum (6) | Westchester County Center; 1,971 |
| Sunday, July 7 | 5:00 p.m. | Washington Mystics | @ | Los Angeles Sparks | League Pass, Spectrum Sportsnet, Monumental | 81–98 | N. Ogwumike (31) | Tied (10) | C. Gray (13) | Staples Center; 10,336 |
| Sunday, July 7 | 6:00 p.m. | Dallas Wings | @ | Chicago Sky | League Pass, The U Too | 66–78 | Ogunbowale (22) | Lavender (10) | Vandersloot (11) | Wintrust Arena; 6,102 |
| Sunday, July 7 | 6:00 p.m. | Atlanta Dream | @ | Phoenix Mercury | League Pass, WSB Now | 63–65 | Griner (31) | Bonner (14) | Mitchell (4) | Talking Stick Resort Arena; 9,850 |
| Tuesday, July 9 | 1:00 p.m. | Los Angeles Sparks | @ | Dallas Wings | Twitter, Fox Sports Southwest | 62–75 | Thornton (17) | Tied (10) | Tied (4) | College Park Center; 6,885 |
| Wednesday, July 10 | 11:00 a.m. | Connecticut Sun | @ | Atlanta Dream | USA: NBA TV, Bounce TV, WSB Now, NESN; Canada: NBA TV Canada | 75–78 | Hayes (18) | Breland (13) | Tied (4) | State Farm Arena; 3,866 |
| Wednesday, July 10 | 11:30 a.m. | Phoenix Mercury | @ | Washington Mystics | Twitter | 91–68 | Griner (25) | Griner (8) | Tied (6) | Capital One Arena; 15,377 |
| Wednesday, July 10 | 12:00 p.m. | Las Vegas Aces | @ | Indiana Fever | League Pass | 74–71 | Cambage (19) | McCowan (12) | Wheeler (7) | Bankers Life Fieldhouse; 9,247 |
| Wednesday, July 10 | 9:00 p.m. | Minnesota Lynx | @ | Chicago Sky | CBSSN | 73–72 | Quigley (24) | Fowles (12) | G. Williams (5) | Wintrust Arena; 8,508 |
| Friday, July 12 | 7:00 p.m. | Los Angeles Sparks | @ | Indiana Fever | League Pass, Fox Sports Indiana | 90–84 | N. Ogwumike (22) | C. Ogwumike (9) | C. Gray (6) | Bankers Life Fieldhouse; 7,849 |
| Friday, July 12 | 7:30 p.m. | Minnesota Lynx | @ | Atlanta Dream | League Pass, WSB Now | 53–60 | E. Williams (17) | Fowles (12) | Sims (7) | State Farm Arena; 4,001 |
| Friday, July 12 | 8:00 p.m. | Phoenix Mercury | @ | Connecticut Sun | USA: ESPN2; Canada: NBA TV Canada | 64–79 | Tied (20) | J. Jones (11) | J. Thomas (8) | Mohegan Sun Arena; 6,864 |
| Friday, July 12 | 8:00 p.m. | New York Liberty | @ | Chicago Sky | League Pass, The U Too | 83–99 | Nurse (18) | Dolson (9) | Vandersloot (12) | Wintrust Arena; 7,221 |
| Friday, July 12 | 10:00 p.m. | Dallas Wings | @ | Seattle Storm | CBSSN | 81–95 | Ogunbowale (23) | Johnson (9) | Canada (12) | Alaska Airlines Arena; 6,451 |
| Saturday, July 13 | 7:00 p.m. | Las Vegas Aces | @ | Washington Mystics | CBSSN, Monumental | 85–81 | Cloud (18) | Sanders (10) | Toliver (7) | St. Elizabeths East Arena; 4,200 |
| Sunday, July 14 | 3:00 p.m. | Los Angeles Sparks | @ | Atlanta Dream | USA: NBA TV, WSB Now; Canada: TSN4/5 | 76–71 (OT) | Hayes (24) | Billings (16) | C. Gray (9) | State Farm Arena; 5,083 |
| Sunday, July 14 | 4:00 p.m. | Connecticut Sun | @ | Indiana Fever | League Pass, NESN | 76–63 | J. Jones (26) | Tied (8) | J. Thomas (6) | Bankers Life Fieldhouse; 6,434 |
| Sunday, July 14 | 4:00 p.m. | Chicago Sky | @ | Dallas Wings | League Pass, For Sports Southwest Plus | 89–79 | DeShields (26) | McGee-Stafford (8) | Vandersloot (8) | College Park Center; 4,261 |
| Sunday, July 14 | 7:00 p.m. | Phoenix Mercury | @ | Minnesota Lynx | USA:NBA TV, Fox Sports Go; Canada: SN1 | 62–75 | Bonner (27) | Fowles (13) | Tied (5) | Target Center; 8,801 |
| Sunday, July 14 | 7:00 p.m. | New York Liberty | @ | Seattle Storm | League Pass, JoeTV | 69–78 | Tied (19) | Canada (9) | Canada (8) | Alaska Airlines Arena; 6,733 |
| Wednesday, July 17 | 12:00 p.m. | Atlanta Dream | @ | Chicago Sky | Twitter, Bounce TV | 76–77 | Montgomery (23) | Breland (11) | Vandersloot (9) | Wintrust Arena; 10,143 |
| Wednesday, July 17 | 3:30 p.m. | Dallas Wings | @ | Phoenix Mercury | USA: NBA TV, Fox Sports Arizona, Fox Sports Southwest; Canada: NBA TV Canada | 64–69 | Griner (23) | McGee-Stafford (11) | January (5) | Talking Stick Resort Arena; 10,143 |
| Wednesday, July 17 | 8:00 p.m. | Seattle Storm | @ | Minnesota Lynx | USA: NBA TV, Fox Sports North; Canada: NBA TV Canada | 90–79 | Howard (33) | Russell (9) | Robinson (10) | Target Center; 8,403 |
| Thursday, July 18 | 3:30 p.m. | Dallas Wings | @ | Los Angeles Sparks | USA: NBA TV, Spectrum Sportsnet; Canada: NBA TV Canada | 64–69 | N. Ogwumike (22) | Tied (9) | Ogunbowale (7) | Staples Center; 14,050 |
| Friday, July 19 | 7:00 p.m. | Washington Mystics | @ | Indiana Fever | CBSSN, WNDY, Monumental | 95–88 | Delle Donne (28) | Delle Donne (15) | Cloud (7) | Bankers Life Fieldhouse; 6,726 |
| Friday, July 19 | 7:30 p.m. | Atlanta Dream | @ | Connecticut Sun | USA: NBA TV, NESN+, WSB Now; Canada: SN1 | 69–98 | Sykes (26) | J. Jones (9) | C. Williams (5) | Mohegan Sun Arena; 6,733 |
| Friday, July 19 | 10:00 p.m. | Las Vegas Aces | @ | Seattle Storm | USA: NBA TV; Canada: NBA TV Canada | 66–69 | Howard (21) | Cambage (16) | Canada (4) | Alaska Airlines Arena; 9,000 |
| Saturday, July 20 | 3:00 p.m. | Los Angeles Sparks | @ | New York Liberty | USA: NBA TV, Fox Sports Go, Spectrum Sports Net; Canada: TSN2 | 78–83 | N. Ogwumike (20) | N. Ogwumike (12) | Tied (6) | Westchester County Center; 2,195 |
| Saturday, July 20 | 8:00 p.m. | Phoenix Mercury | @ | Dallas Wings | USA: NBA TV, Fox Sports Southwest Plus, FSAZ+ Canada: NBA TV Canada | 70–66 | Griner (17) | Plaisance (10) | January (4) | College Park Center; 5,471 |
| Sunday, July 21 | 3:00 p.m. | Atlanta Dream | @ | Washington Mystics | USA: NBA TV, NBC Sports Washington, Bounce TV/WSB Now; Canada: NBA TV Canada | 65–93 | Delle Donne (28) | Tied (8) | Toliver (7) | St. Elizabeths East Arena; 4,200 |
| Sunday, July 21 | 6:00 p.m. | Indiana Fever | @ | Chicago Sky | USA: NBA TV, The U Too; Canada: NBA TV Canada | 70–78 | Tied (19) | McCowan (16) | Vandersloot (14) | Wintrust Arena; 6,614 |
| Sunday, July 21 | 6:00 p.m. | Minnesota Lynx | @ | Las Vegas Aces | League Pass, MYLVTV | 74–79 | Cambage (22) | Cambage (13) | Plum (8) | Mandalay Bay Events Center; 4,352 |
| Tuesday, July 23 | 7:00 p.m. | Los Angeles Sparks | @ | Atlanta Dream | Twitter | 78–66 | N. Ogwumike (24) | C. Ogwumike (12) | C. Gray (6) | State Farm Arena; 7,047 |
| Tuesday, July 23 | 10:00 p.m. | Seattle Storm | @ | Las Vegas Aces | USA: ESPN2; Canada: TSN3/5 | 62–79 | Hamby (24) | Cambage (12) | Cambage (6) | Mandalay Bay Events Center; 5,193 |
| Tuesday, July 23 | 10:00 p.m. | Indiana Fever | @ | Phoenix Mercury | ESPN3, League Pass | 77–95 | Tied (22) | McCowan (9) | Wheeler (9) | Talking Stick Resort Arena; 8,528 |
| Wednesday, July 24 | 11:30 a.m. | New York Liberty | @ | Connecticut Sun | League Pass, NESN+ | 63–70 | J. Thomas (18) | A. Thomas (12) | J. Thomas (7) | Mohegan Sun Arena; 8,249 |
| Wednesday, July 24 | 1:00 p.m. | Washington Mystics | @ | Minnesota Lynx | USA: NBA TV, Fox Sports Go, Monumental; Canada: SN1 | 79–71 | Toliver (32) | Fowles (12) | Toliver (6) | Target Center; 17,934 |
| Saturday, July 27 | 3:30 p.m. | Team Wilson | @ | Team Delle Donne | USA: ABC; Canada: TSN5, SN1 | 129–126 | Wheeler (25) | J. Jones (13) | C. Gray (10) | Mandalay Bay Events Center; 9,157 |
| Tuesday, July 30 | 7:00 p.m. | Chicago Sky | @ | Connecticut Sun | USA: NBA TV, NESN+, The U Too; Canada: TSN4 | 94–100 | J. Jones (27) | J. Jones (11) | Vandersloot (11) | Mohegan Sun Arena; 6,358 |
| Tuesday, July 30 | 7:00 p.m. | Phoenix Mercury | @ | Washington Mystics | Twitter, NBC Sports Washington | 93–99 | Delle Donne (33) | Griner (9) | Mitchell (8) | St. Elizabeths East Arena; 3,819 |
| Tuesday, July 30 | 10:00 p.m. | Dallas Wings | @ | Las Vegas Aces | Twitter, MYLVTV | 54–86 | Tied (18) | Hamby (11) | J. Young (7) | Mandalay Bay Events Center; 3,756 |
| Wednesday, July 31 | 7:00 p.m. | Atlanta Dream | @ | Indiana Fever | CBSSN | 59–61 | E. Williams (17) | McCowan (14) | Tied (4) | Bankers Life Fieldhouse; 5,702 |

August

| Date | Time (ET) | Matchup | | | TV | Result | High points | High rebounds | High assists | Location/Attendance |
|---|---|---|---|---|---|---|---|---|---|---|
| Thursday, August 1 | 7:00 p.m. | Phoenix Mercury | @ | Connecticut Sun | CBSSN | 62–68 | Bonner (20) | J. Jones (14) | C. Williams (5) | Mohegan Sun Arena; 6,014 |
| Thursday, August 1 | 8:00 p.m. | New York Liberty | @ | Dallas Wings | USA: NBA TV, Fox Sports Southwest; Canada: SN1 | 64–87 | Ogunbowale (22) | Gustafson (8) | A. Gray (9) | College Park Center; 4,011 |
| Thursday, August 1 | 10:00 p.m. | Las Vegas Aces | @ | Los Angeles Sparks | USA: ESPN2; Canada: NBA TV Canada | 68–76 | Tied (19) | Tied (11) | C. Gray (10) | Staples Center; 11,692 |
| Friday, August 2 | 10:00 p.m. | Washington Mystics | @ | Seattle Storm | USA: NBA TV, JoeTV, Monumental; Canada: NBA TV Canada | 99–79 | Delle Donne (29) | Delle Donne (12) | Canada (6) | Angel of the Winds Arena; 7,488 |
| Saturday, August 3 | 7:00 p.m. | Chicago Sky | @ | Atlanta Dream | League Pass, WSB Now, The U Too | 87–78 | Bentley (21) | DeShields (12) | Vandersloot (9) | State Farm Arena; 5,427 |
| Saturday, August 3 | 7:00 p.m. | Minnesota Lynx | @ | Indiana Fever | League Pass, Fox Sports Indiana, Fox Sports North Plus | 75–86 | K. Mitchell (20) | McCowan (8) | K. Mitchell (9) | Bankers Life Fieldhouse; 7,884 |
| Saturday, August 3 | 8:00 p.m. | Las Vegas Aces | @ | Dallas Wings | USA: NBA TV, Fox Sports Southwest Plus; Canada: NBA TV Canada | 75–70 | Ogunbowale (24) | Swords (10) | J. Young (5) | College Park Center; 5,882 |
| Sunday, August 4 | 3:00 p.m. | Connecticut Sun | @ | New York Liberty | USA: NBA TV, YES, WTIC; Canada: NBA TV Canada | 94–79 | C. Williams (28) | Tied (10) | Tied (5) | Westchester County Center; 1,927 |
| Sunday, August 4 | 5:00 p.m. | Seattle Storm | @ | Los Angeles Sparks | USA: NBA TV, Spectrum SportsNet; Canada: NBA TV Canada | 75–83 | Parker (21) | N. Ogwumike (10) | Gray (8) | Staples Center; 12,820 |
| Sunday, August 4 | 6:00 p.m. | Washington Mystics | @ | Phoenix Mercury | League Pass, Monumental | 82–103 | Griner (26) | Griner (9) | Griner (8) | Talking Stick Resort Arena; 9,025 |
| Tuesday, August 6 | 7:00 p.m. | Minnesota Lynx | @ | Atlanta Dream | Twitter | 85–69 | Collier (22) | Tied (11) | Collier (5) | State Farm Arena; 3,395 |
| Wednesday, August 7 | 8:00 p.m. | New York Liberty | @ | Chicago Sky | Twitter, The U Too | 92–101 | Charles (24) | Lavender (10) | Vandersloot (8) | Wintrust Arena; 5,797 |
| Thursday, August 8 | 7:00 p.m. | Indiana Fever | @ | Washington Mystics | CBSSN, Monumental | 78–91 | Delle Donne (22) | Delle Donne (8) | Toliver (11) | St. Elizabeths East Arena; 3,013 |
| Thursday, August 8 | 10:00 p.m. | Phoenix Mercury | @ | Los Angeles Sparks | USA: ESPN2; Canada: NBA TV Canada | 74–84 | Griner (27) | B. Turner (14) | Parker (6) | Staples Center; 10,345 |
| Thursday, August 8 | 10:00 p.m. | Dallas Wings | @ | Seattle Storm | League Pass, JoeTV | 57–69 | Howard (23) | Howard (11) | Tied (6) | Angel of the Winds Arena; 6,268 |
| Friday, August 9 | 8:00 p.m. | Connecticut Sun | @ | Minnesota Lynx | CBSSN, Fox Sports Go, NESN+ | 57–89 | Fowles (17) | Fowles (12) | Sims (9) | Target Center; 8,892 |
| Friday, August 9 | 10:30 p.m. | Chicago Sky | @ | Las Vegas Aces | CBSSN, MYLVTV | 87–84 | Cambage (28) | Hamby (12) | Vandersloot (13) | Mandalay Bay Events Center; 4,200 |
| Saturday, August 10 | 4:00 p.m. | Atlanta Dream | @ | Indiana Fever | CBSSN | 82–87 | Hayes (34) | Tied (9) | Wheeler (7) | Bankers Life Fieldhouse; 7,923 |
| Saturday, August 10 | 10:00 p.m. | Dallas Wings | @ | Phoenix Mercury | League Pass | 80–77 | Tied (23) | B. Turner (11) | Ogunbowale (4) | Talking Stick Resort Arena; 9,717 |
| Sunday, August 11 | 3:00 p.m. | Seattle Storm | @ | New York Liberty | NBA TV, Fox Sports Go | 84–69 | Charles (22) | 3 tied (8) | Wright (7) | Barclays Center; 7,715 |
| Sunday, August 11 | 3:00 p.m. | Minnesota Lynx | @ | Washington Mystics | League Pass, NBC Sports Washington | 78–101 | Meesseman (25) | Delle Donne (10) | Sims (8) | St. Elizabeths East Arena; 4,200 |
| Sunday, August 11 | 5:00 p.m. | Chicago Sky | @ | Los Angeles Sparks | League Pass, Spectrum SportsNet | 81–84 | Gray (26) | Ogwumike (12) | Tied (6) | Staples Center; 9,244 |
| Sunday, August 11 | 6:00 p.m. | Connecticut Sun | @ | Las Vegas Aces | USA: ESPN2; Canada: NBA TV Canada, TSN2 | 81–89 | Cambage (21) | Tied (12) | Tied (6) | Mandalay Bay Events Center; 4,633 |
| Tuesday, August 13 | 7:00 p.m. | Minnesota Lynx | @ | New York Liberty | League Pass, Fox Sports Go | 89–73 | Allen (28) | Boyd (9) | Boyd (7) | Westchester County Center; 1,570 |
| Tuesday, August 13 | 10:00 p.m. | Atlanta Dream | @ | Las Vegas Aces | Twitter, MYLVTV | 90–94 | Hamby (23) | Hamby (16) | Bentley (7) | Mandalay Bay Events Center; 3,532 |
| Wednesday, August 14 | 8:00 p.m. | Seattle Storm | @ | Washington Mystics | CBSSN, Monumental | 59–88 | Howard (24) | Tied (8) | Howard (4) | St. Elizabeths East Arena; 3,917 |
| Wednesday, August 14 | 8:00 p.m. | Los Angeles Sparks | @ | Dallas Wings | League Pass, Fox Sports Southwest | 78–84 | Ogunbowale (35) | Ogwumike (9) | Gray (7) | College Park Center; 5,004 |
| Wednesday, August 14 | 10:00 p.m. | Connecticut Sun | @ | Phoenix Mercury | USA: ESPN2 Canada: NBA TV Canada | 78–71 | J. Thomas (18) | J. Jones (14) | 3 tied (4) | Talking Stick Resort Arena; 8,734 |
| Friday, August 16 | 7:30 p.m. | Seattle Storm | @ | Connecticut Sun | League Pass, NESN+ | 78–79 | Howard (27) | A. Thomas (11) | J. Thomas (7) | Mohegan Sun Arena; 7,092 |
| Friday, August 16 | 8:00 p.m. | Los Angeles Sparks | @ | Chicago Sky | League Pass, The U Too, Spectrum Sportsnet | 81–91 | Quigley (26) | Ndour (9) | Vandersloot (9) | Wintrust Arena; 7,907 |
| Friday, August 16 | 8:00 p.m. | New York Liberty | @ | Dallas Wings | USA: CBSSN; Canada: SN1 | 77–83 | Charles (25) | Wright (9) | Wright (7) | College Park Center; 4,070 |
| Friday, August 16 | 8:00 p.m. | Washington Mystics | @ | Minnesota Lynx | League Pass, Fox Sports Go, Monumental | 86–79 | Atkins (18) | Collier (9) | Tied (8) | Target Center; 8,803 |
| Friday, August 16 | 10:00 p.m. | Atlanta Dream | @ | Phoenix Mercury | CBSSN | 68–77 | Bonner (27) | Bonner (14) | Mitchell (5) | Talking Stick Resort Arena; 8,480 |
| Sunday, August 18 | 3:00 p.m. | Dallas Wings | @ | Connecticut Sun | League Pass, NESN+ | 68–78 | Gray (22) | Harrison (13) | Thomas (9) | Mohegan Sun Arena; 7,275 |
| Sunday, August 18 | 3:00 p.m. | Indiana Fever | @ | Washington Mystics | USA: NBA TV, NBC Sports Washington; Canada: TSN5 | 68–107 | Delle Donne (25) | McCowan (10) | Cloud (8) | St. Elizabeths East Arena; 4,034 |
| Sunday, August 18 | 6:00 p.m. | Las Vegas Aces | @ | Chicago Sky | USA: NBA TV, The U Too; Canada: NBA TV Canada | 100–85 | DeShields (28) | Tied (10) | Vandersloot (9) | Wintrust Arena; 6,072 |
| Sunday, August 18 | 6:00 p.m. | New York Liberty | @ | Phoenix Mercury | League Pass | 72–78 | Bonner (30) | Charles (13) | Tied (5) | Talking Stick Resort Arena; 9,145 |
| Sunday, August 18 | 7:00 p.m. | Minnesota Lynx | @ | Seattle Storm | League Pass, JoeTV | 74–82 | Sims (30) | Tied (6) | Robinson (9) | Alaska Airlines Arena; 9,000 |
| Tuesday, August 20 | 7:00 p.m. | Chicago Sky | @ | Atlanta Dream | Twitter, The U Too | 87–83 | Hayes (27) | Ndour (10) | Vandersloot (10) | State Farm Arena; 4,662 |
| Tuesday, August 20 | 7:00 p.m. | New York Liberty | @ | Indiana Fever | USA: NBA TV, WNDY; Canada: NBA TV Canada | 82–76 | McCowan (24) | Charles (14) | Tied (5) | Bankers Life Fieldhouse; 5,340 |
| Tuesday, August 20 | 10:00 p.m. | Phoenix Mercury | @ | Las Vegas Aces | Twitter, MYLVTV | 79–84 (OT) | Tied (24) | Cambage (15) | J. Young (10) | Mandalay Bay Events Center; 5,032 |
| Tuesday, August 20 | 10:30 p.m. | Minnesota Lynx | @ | Los Angeles Sparks | USA: NBA TV, Spectrum SportsNet; Canada: NBA TV Canada | 71–81 | Tied (20) | Parker (10) | Tied (4) | Staples Center; 9,244 |
| Thursday, August 22 | 8:00 p.m. | Dallas Wings | @ | Minnesota Lynx | USA: League Pass; Canada: NBA TV Canada | 70–86 | Ogunbowale (22) | Tied (7) | Dantas (8) | Target Center; 8,124 |
| Thursday, August 22 | 10:30 p.m. | Indiana Fever | @ | Los Angeles Sparks | CBSSN, Spectrum SportsNet | 65–98 | N. Ogwumike (17) | 3 tied (7) | Wheeler (6) | Staples Center; 8,816 |
| Friday, August 23 | 7:30 p.m. | Las Vegas Aces | @ | Connecticut Sun | USA: NBA TV, NESN+ Canada: NBA TV Canada | 85–89 | A. Thomas (27) | A. Thomas (12) | J. Thomas (8) | Mohegan Sun Arena; 7,483 |
| Friday, August 23 | 7:30 p.m. | Atlanta Dream | @ | New York Liberty | CBSSN | 90–87 | Hayes (19) | Breland (12) | Tied (6) | Westchester County Center; 1,831 |
| Friday, August 23 | 8:00 p.m. | Washington Mystics | @ | Chicago Sky | League Pass, The U Too, Monumental | 78–85 | DeShields (22) | Vandersloot (8) | Vandersloot (9) | Wintrust Arena; 6,131 |
| Sunday, August 25 | 3:00 p.m. | New York Liberty | @ | Washington Mystics | USA: NBA TV, NBC Sports Washington; Canada: SN1 | 72–101 | Nurse (24) | Delle Donne (10) | Hawkins (5) | St. Elizabeths East Arena; 4,200 |
| Sunday, August 25 | 4:00 p.m. | Atlanta Dream | @ | Dallas Wings | League Pass, Fox Sports Southwest Plus | 77–73 | Ogunbowale (29) | Breland (12) | Bentley (4) | College Park Center; 4,715 |
| Sunday, August 25 | 5:00 p.m. | Connecticut Sun | @ | Los Angeles Sparks | USA: NBA TV, Spectrum SportsNet, NESN+ Canada: NBA TV Canada | 72–84 | R. Williams (21) | J. Jones (12) | Gray (6) | Staples Center; 17,076 |
| Sunday, August 25 | 6:00 p.m. | Chicago Sky | @ | Phoenix Mercury | League Pass, Fox Sports Arizona, The U Too | 94–86 | Griner (34) | Parker (12) | Vandersloot (13) | Talking Stick Resort Arena; 12,054 |
| Sunday, August 25 | 7:00 p.m. | Las Vegas Aces | @ | Minnesota Lynx | USA: NBA TV, Fox Sports North; Canada: TSN2 | 77–98 | Tied (23) | Hamby (7) | Robinson (8) | Target Center; 8,834 |
| Sunday, August 25 | 7:00 p.m. | Indiana Fever | @ | Seattle Storm | League Pass, JoeTV | 63–54 | McCowan (22) | McCowan (19) | Howard (5) | Alaska Airlines Arena; 8,076 |
| Tuesday, August 27 | 7:00 p.m. | Las Vegas Aces | @ | Indiana Fever | ESPN3, League Pass, WNDY | 71–86 | McCowan (24) | McCowan (17) | Plum (6) | Bankers Life Fieldhouse; 6,958 |
| Tuesday, August 27 | 7:00 p.m. | Phoenix Mercury | @ | New York Liberty | USA: ESPN3, League Pass, YES; Canada: SN1 | 95–82 | Tied (29) | Griner (14) | Taurasi (10) | Westchester County Center; 1,693 |
| Tuesday, August 27 | 7:00 p.m. | Los Angeles Sparks | @ | Washington Mystics | USA: ESPN2; Canada: NBA TV Canada | 66–95 | Powers (20) | Sanders (9) | Gray (7) | St. Elizabeths East Arena; 4,200 |
| Tuesday, August 27 | 8:00 p.m. | Chicago Sky | @ | Minnesota Lynx | ESPN3, League Pass, Fox Sports Go (Minnesota) | 85–93 | Fowles (25) | Fowles (12) | Vandersloot (10) | Target Center; 8,092 |
| Tuesday, August 27 | 10:00 p.m. | Connecticut Sun | @ | Seattle Storm | Twitter, JoeTV | 89–70 | A. Thomas (22) | A. Thomas (11) | Canada (5) | Alaska Airlines Arena; 6,258 |
| Thursday, August 29 | 7:00 p.m. | Los Angeles Sparks | @ | Indiana Fever | League Pass, Fox Sports Indiana | 87–83 | Gray (30) | McCowan (10) | Gray (9) | Bankers Life Fieldhouse; 5,641 |
| Thursday, August 29 | 7:00 p.m. | Phoenix Mercury | @ | Atlanta Dream | USA: NBA TV, WSB Now; Canada: NBA TV Canada | 65–58 | Griner (21) | Breland (11) | Taurasi (8) | State Farm Arena; 3,727 |
| Thursday, August 29 | 8:00 p.m. | Dallas Wings | @ | Chicago Sky | League Pass, The U Too | 88–83 | Ogunbowale (35) | Harrison (12) | Vandersloot (7) | Wintrust Arena; 5,614 |
| Friday, August 30 | 7:30 p.m. | Connecticut Sun | @ | New York Liberty | USA: NBA TV, Fox Sports Go (New York), NESN+ Canada: TSN2 | 94–84 | C. Williams (26) | A. Thomas (9) | J. Thomas (7) | Westchester County Center; 1,791 |
| Saturday, August 31 | 8:00 p.m. | Washington Mystics | @ | Dallas Wings | USA: NBA TV, Monumental; Canada: NBA TV Canada | 91–85 | Ogunbowale (30) | Sanders (10) | Tied (7) | College Park Center; 5,205 |
| Saturday, August 31 | 10:30 p.m. | Los Angeles Sparks | @ | Las Vegas Aces | USA: NBA TV, MYLVTV; Canada: NBA TV Canada | 86–92 | R. Williams (37) | Tied (12) | Gray (7) | Mandalay Bay Events Center; 8,470 |

September

| Date | Time (ET) | Matchup | | | TV | Result | High points | High rebounds | High assists | Location/Attendance |
|---|---|---|---|---|---|---|---|---|---|---|
| Sunday, September 1 | 6:00 p.m. | Phoenix Mercury | @ | Chicago Sky | League Pass, The U Too | 78–105 | Griner (26) | Bonner (12) | Vandersloot (13) | Wintrust Arena; 8,845 |
| Sunday, September 1 | 7:00 p.m. | Indiana Fever | @ | Minnesota Lynx | League Pass, Fox Sports North, Fox Sports Indiana | 73–81 | Dupree (18) | McCowan (11) | T. Mitchell (6) | Target Center; 8,833 |
| Sunday, September 1 | 7:00 p.m. | Atlanta Dream | @ | Seattle Storm | USA: NBA TV, JoeTV, WSB Now; Canada: NBA TV Canada | 75–92 | Canada (21) | Tied (8) | Canada (8) | Alaska Airlines Arena; 9,000 |
| Tuesday, September 3 | 7:00 p.m. | Washington Mystics | @ | New York Liberty | USA: NBA TV, Fox Sports Go (New York), Monumental; Canada: TSN2 | 93–77 | Delle Donne (30) | Tied (10) | Cloud (9) | Westchester County Center; 1,558 |
| Tuesday, September 3 | 10:00 p.m. | Seattle Storm | @ | Phoenix Mercury | ESPN2 | 82–70 | Tied (22) | Howard (12) | Canada (10) | Talking Stick Resort Arena; 8,724 |
| Tuesday, September 3 | 10:30 p.m. | Atlanta Dream | @ | Los Angeles Sparks | ESPN3, League Pass, Sectrum SportsNet | 60–70 | Parker (21) | Parker (11) | Parker (6) | Staples Center; 9,889 |
| Wednesday, September 4 | 7:00 p.m. | Dallas Wings | @ | Connecticut Sun | CBSSN, NESN+ | 72–102 | Ogunbowale (32) | C. Williams (8) | Hiedeman (9) | Mohegan Sun Arena; 6,284 |
| Thursday, September 5 | 7:00 p.m. | Las Vegas Aces | @ | Atlanta Dream | CBSSN | 74–78 | E. Williams (20) | Billings (14) | J. Young (9) | State Farm Arena; 4,023 |
| Thursday, September 5 | 10:30 p.m. | Seattle Storm | @ | Los Angeles Sparks | CBSSN, Spectrum SportsNet | 68–102 | Parker (20) | N. Ogwumike (10) | Gray (9) | Staples Center; 10,591 |
| Friday, September 6 | 7:00 p.m. | Dallas Wings | @ | Washington Mystics | Twitter, NBCSWA+, Monumental | 73–86 | Ogunbowale (30) | Meesseeman (10) | Ogunbowale (6) | St. Elizabeths East Arena; 3,963 |
| Friday, September 6 | 7:00 p.m. | Indiana Fever | @ | New York Liberty | USA: League Pass, YES; Canada: SN1 | 86–81 | K. Mitchell (22) | McCowan (13) | Tied (7) | Westchester County Center; 2,301 |
| Friday, September 6 | 7:30 p.m. | Chicago Sky | @ | Connecticut Sun | League Pass, NESN+, The U Too | 109–104 | DeShields (30) | 3 tied (9) | Vandersloot (11) | Mohegan Sun Arena; 8,077 |
| Friday, September 6 | 10:00 p.m. | Minnesota Lynx | @ | Phoenix Mercury | League Pass, Fox Sports Arizona, Fox Sports North Plus | 83–69 | Sims (22) | Fowles (11) | Sims (9) | Talking Stick Resort Arena; 12,140 |
| Sunday, September 8 | 4:00 p.m. | New York Liberty | @ | Atlanta Dream | ESPN3, League Pass, WSB Now | 71–63 | Bentley (17) | Breland (12) | Charles (5) | State Farm Arena; 5,495 |
| Sunday, September 8 | 4:00 p.m. | Connecticut Sun | @ | Indiana Fever | ESPN3, League Pass, WNDY, WTIC | 76–104 | K. Mitchell (38) | B. Jones (10) | Laney (7) | Bankers Life Fieldhouse; 5,451 |
| Sunday, September 8 | 4:00 p.m. | Chicago Sky | @ | Washington Mystics | ESPN3, League Pass, Monumental | 86–100 | Delle Donne (25) | Delle Donne (12) | Tied (6) | St. Elizabeths East Arena; 4,200 |
| Sunday, September 8 | 4:00 p.m. | Seattle Storm | @ | Dallas Wings | ESPN3, League Pass, Fox Sports Southwest Plus | 78–64 | Ogunbowale (25) | Howard (9) | 3 tied (5) | College Park Center; 5,910 |
| Sunday, September 8 | 4:00 p.m. | Las Vegas Aces | @ | Phoenix Mercury | ESPN3, League Pass, Fox Sports Arizona | 98–89 | Griner (24) | Cambage (9) | Tied (4) | Talking Stick Resort Arena; 13,135 |
| Sunday, September 8 | 4:00 p.m. | Minnesota Lynx | @ | Los Angeles Sparks | USA: ESPN2; Canada: NBA TV Canada | 68–77 | Collier (16) | Collier (11) | Dantas (9) | Staples Center; 13,500 |

2019 WNBA postseason
First Round

| Date | Time (ET) | Matchup | | | TV | Result | High points | High rebounds | High assists | Location/Attendance |
|---|---|---|---|---|---|---|---|---|---|---|
| September 11 | 8:00 p.m. | Phoenix Mercury | @ | Chicago Sky | USA: ESPN2; Canada: SN1 | 76–105 | DeShields (25) | Ndour (9) | Vandersloot (11) | Wintrust Arena; 6,042 |
| September 11 | 10:00 p.m. | Minnesota Lynx | @ | Seattle Storm | USA: ESPN2; Canada: TSN2 | 78–84 | Canada (26) | Fowles (11) | Howard (6) | Angel of the Winds Arena; 5,011 |

Second Round

| Date | Time (ET) | Matchup | | | TV | Result | High points | High rebounds | High assists | Location/Attendance |
|---|---|---|---|---|---|---|---|---|---|---|
| September 15 | 3:00 p.m. | Seattle Storm | @ | Los Angeles Sparks | USA: ESPN2; Canada: SN1 | 69–92 | Gray (21) | Howard (11) | Gray (8) | Staples Center; 9,081 |
| September 15 | 5:00 p.m. | Chicago Sky | @ | Las Vegas Aces | USA: ESPN2; Canada: TSN2 | 92–93 | Tied (23) | Cambage (17) | Vandersloot (12) | Thomas & Mack Center; 7,981 |

Semifinals

| Date | Time (ET) | Matchup | | | TV | Result | High points | High rebounds | High assists | Location/Attendance |
|---|---|---|---|---|---|---|---|---|---|---|
| September 17 | 6:30 p.m. | Los Angeles Sparks | @ | Connecticut Sun | USA: ESPN2; Canada: SN1 | 75–84 | Parker (24) | 3 tied (10) | J. Thomas (8) | Mohegan Sun Arena; 7,102 |
| September 17 | 8:30 p.m. | Las Vegas Aces | @ | Washington Mystics | USA: ESPN2; Canada: TSN4/5 | 95–97 | Meesseman (27) | Cambage (12) | Plum (9) | St. Elizabeth's East Arena; 3,986 |
| September 19 | 6:30 p.m. | Los Angeles Sparks | @ | Connecticut Sun | USA: ESPN2; Canada: TSN3 | 68–94 | J. Jones (27) | Tied (13) | J. Thomas (7) | Mohegan Sun Arena; 8,051 |
| September 19 | 8:30 p.m. | Las Vegas Aces | @ | Washington Mystics | USA: ESPN2; Canada: TSN3 | 91–103 | Meesseman (30) | Tied (10) | Cloud (11) | St. Elizabeth's East Arena; 4,200 |
| September 22 | 5:00 p.m. | Washington Mystics | @ | Las Vegas Aces | USA: ESPN2; Canada: TSN5 | 75–92 | Cambage (28) | Tied (8) | Plum (9) | Mandalay Bay Events Center; 6,175 |
| September 22 | 7:00 p.m. | Connecticut Sun | @ | Los Angeles Sparks | USA: ESPN2; Canada: SN1 | 78–56 | J. Thomas (29) | C. Williams (13) | A. Thomas (6) | Walter Pyramid; 4,000 |
| September 24 | 9:00 p.m. | Washington Mystics | @ | Las Vegas Aces | USA: ESPN2; Canada: TSN5 | 94–90 | Tied (25) | Cambage (12) | Tied (9) | Mandalay Bay Events Center; 5,465 |

WNBA Finals

| Date | Time (ET) | Matchup | | | TV | Result | High points | High rebounds | High assists | Location/Attendance |
|---|---|---|---|---|---|---|---|---|---|---|
| September 29 | 3:00 p.m. | Connecticut Sun | @ | Washington Mystics | USA: ESPN; Canada: TSN5 | 86–95 | C. Williams (26) | Delle Donne (10) | Cloud (7) | St. Elizabeth's East Arena; 4,200 |
| October 1 | 8:00 p.m. | Connecticut Sun | @ | Washington Mystics | USA: ESPN; Canada: TSN2 | 99–87 | J. Jones (32) | J. Jones (18) | Toliver (7) | St. Elizabeth's East Arena; 4,200 |
| October 6 | 3:30 p.m. | Washington Mystics | @ | Connecticut Sun | USA: ABC; Canada: SN360 | 94–81 | Meesseman (21) | J. Jones (9) | Toliver (10) | Mohegan Sun Arena; 9,170 |
| October 8 | 8:00 p.m. | Washington Mystics | @ | Connecticut Sun | USA: ESPN2; Canada: TSN4/5 | 86–90 | J. Jones (18) | J. Jones (13) | A. Thomas (11) | Mohegan Sun Arena; 8,458 |
| October 10 | 8:00 p.m. | Connecticut Sun | @ | Washington Mystics | USA: ESPN2; Canada: TSN4 | 89–78 | J. Jones (25) | A. Thomas (12) | Tied (6) | St. Elizabeth's East Arena; 4,200 |

== Playoffs ==
The WNBA continued its current playoff format for 2019. The top eight teams, regardless of conference, make the playoffs, with the top two teams receiving a bye to the semi-finals. The remaining six teams play in two single-elimination playoff rounds, with the third and fourth seeds receiving a bye to the second round.

**First round** Single elimination (Sept. 11)
5 | **Chicago Sky** | **105**
8 | Phoenix Mercury | 76
6 | **Seattle Storm** | **84**
7 | Minnesota Lynx | 74

**Second round** Single elimination (Sept. 15)
4 | **Las Vegas Aces** | **93**
5 | Chicago Sky | 92
3 | **Los Angeles Sparks** | **92**
6 | Seattle Storm | 69

**Semifinals**; Best-of-5 (Sept. 17 – 24)
1 | **Washington Mystics** | **3**
4 | Las Vegas Aces | 1
2 | **Connecticut Sun** | **3**
3 | Los Angeles Sparks | 0

**WNBA Finals**; Best-of-5 (Sept. 29 – Oct. 10)
1 | **Washington Mystics** | **3**
2 | Connecticut Sun | 2

Note: Teams re-seeded after each round.

- **Bold** – Game or series winner
- Italic – Team with home-court advantage

== Awards ==
=== Individual ===
| Award | | Winner | Team | Position | Votes/Statistic |
|---|---|---|---|---|---|
| Most Valuable Player (MVP) | | Elena Delle Donne | Washington Mystics | Forward/Guard | 41 of 43 |
| Finals MVP | | Emma Meesseman | Washington Mystics | Forward | |
| Rookie of the Year | | Napheesa Collier | Minnesota Lynx | Forward | 29 of 43 |
| Most Improved Player | | Leilani Mitchell | Phoenix Mercury | Guard | 27 of 43 |
| Defensive Player of the Year | | Natasha Howard | Seattle Storm | Forward | 33 of 44 |
| Sixth Woman of the Year | | Dearica Hamby | Las Vegas Aces | Forward | 41 of 43 |
| Kim Perrot Sportsmanship Award | | Nneka Ogwumike | Los Angeles Sparks | Forward | 7 of 43 |
| Dawn Staley Community Leadership Award | | Natasha Cloud | Washington Mystics | | |
| Peak Performers | **Scoring** | Brittney Griner | Phoenix Mercury | Center | 20.7 PPG |
| Peak Performers | **Rebounding** | Jonquel Jones | Connecticut Sun | Center | 9.7 RPG |
| Peak Performers | **Assists** | Courtney Vandersloot | Chicago Sky | Guard | 9.1 APG |
| Coach of the Year | | James Wade | Chicago Sky | Coach | 27 of 43 |
| Basketball Executive of the Year | | Cheryl Reeve | Minnesota Lynx | General Manager/Head Coach | 28 points |

=== Team ===
| Award | | Guard | Guard | Forward | Forward | Center |
|---|---|---|---|---|---|---|
| **All-WNBA** | **First Team** | Courtney Vandersloot | Chelsea Gray | Elena Delle Donne | Natasha Howard | Brittney Griner |
| **All-WNBA** | **Second Team** | Odyssey Sims | Diamond DeShields | Nneka Ogwumike | Jonquel Jones | Liz Cambage |
| **All-Defensive** | **First Team** | Jasmine Thomas | Jordin Canada | Natasha Howard | Nneka Ogwumike | Jonquel Jones |
| **All-Defensive** | **Second Team** | Ariel Atkins | Natasha Cloud | Alysha Clark | Alyssa Thomas | Brittney Griner |
| **All-Rookie Team** | | Arike Ogunbowale | Jackie Young | Napheesa Collier | Brianna Turner | Teaira McCowan |

=== Players of the Week ===
| Week ending | Eastern Conference | | Western Conference | | Reference |
| Week ending | Player | Team | Player | Team | Reference |
|---|---|---|---|---|---|
| June 3 | Jonquel Jones (3) | Connecticut Sun | Natasha Howard | Seattle Storm | |
| June 10 | Jonquel Jones (3) | Connecticut Sun | DeWanna Bonner | Phoenix Mercury | |
| June 17 | Jonquel Jones (3) | Connecticut Sun | Natasha Howard (2) | Seattle Storm | |
| June 24 | Elena Delle Donne (2) | Washington Mystics | A'ja Wilson (2) | Las Vegas Aces | |
| July 1 | Elena Delle Donne (2) | Washington Mystics | A'ja Wilson (2) | Las Vegas Aces | |
| July 8 | Tina Charles | New York Liberty | Brittney Griner | Phoenix Mercury | |
| July 15 | Jonquel Jones (4) | Connecticut Sun | Nneka Ogwumike | Los Angeles Sparks | |
| July 22 | Elena Delle Donne (6) | Washington Mystics | Natasha Howard (3) | Seattle Storm | |
| August 5 | Elena Delle Donne (6) | Washington Mystics | Candace Parker | Los Angeles Sparks | |
| August 12 | Elena Delle Donne (6) | Washington Mystics | Nneka Ogwumike (2) | Los Angeles Sparks | |
| August 19 | Elena Delle Donne (6) | Washington Mystics | Arike Ogunbowale | Dallas Wings | |
| August 26 | Courtney Vandersloot | Chicago Sky | Napheesa Collier | Minnesota Lynx | |
| September 3 | Courtney Williams | Connecticut Sun | Brittney Griner (2) | Phoenix Mercury | |
| September 9 | Elena Delle Donne (7) | Washington Mystics | Candace Parker (2) | Los Angeles Sparks | |

=== Players of the Month ===
| Month | Eastern Conference | | Western Conference | | Reference |
| Month | Player | Team | Player | Team | Reference |
|---|---|---|---|---|---|
| June | Elena Delle Donne (3) | Washington Mystics | Natasha Howard | Seattle Storm | |
| July | Elena Delle Donne (3) | Washington Mystics | Nneka Ogwumike | Los Angeles Sparks | |
| August | Elena Delle Donne (3) | Washington Mystics | Brittney Griner | Phoenix Mercury | |

=== Rookies of the Month ===
| Month | Player | Team | Reference |
|---|---|---|---|
| June | Arike Ogunbowale | Dallas Wings | |
| July | Napheesa Collier | Minnesota Lynx | |
| August | Arike Ogunbowale (2) | Dallas Wings | |

=== Coaches of the Month ===
| Month | Coach | Team | Reference |
|---|---|---|---|
| June | Mike Thibault | Washington Mystics | |
| July | Bill Laimbeer | Las Vegas Aces | |
| August | Mike Thibault (2) | Washington Mystics | |

== Coaches ==
=== Eastern Conference ===
| Team | Head coach | Previous job | Years with team | Record with team | Playoff appearances | Finals Appearances | WNBA Championships |
|---|---|---|---|---|---|---|---|
| Atlanta Dream | Nicki Collen | Connecticut Sun (assistant) | 1 | 23–11 | 1 | 0 | 0 |
| Chicago Sky | James Wade | UMMC Ekaterinburg (assistant) | 0 | 0–0 | 0 | 0 | 0 |
| Connecticut Sun | Curt Miller | Los Angeles Sparks (assistant) | 3 | 56–46 | 3 | 1 | 0 |
| Indiana Fever | Pokey Chatman | Chicago Sky | 2 | 15–53 | 0 | 0 | 0 |
| New York Liberty | Katie Smith | New York Liberty (assistant) | 1 | 7–27 | 0 | 0 | 0 |
| Washington Mystics | Mike Thibault | Connecticut Sun | 6 | 104–100 | 5 | 1 | 0 |

=== Western Conference ===
| Team | Head coach | Previous job | Years with team | Record with team | Playoff appearances | Finals Appearances | WNBA Championships |
|---|---|---|---|---|---|---|---|
| Dallas Wings | Brian Agler | Los Angeles Sparks | 0 | 0–0 | 0 | 0 | 0 |
| Las Vegas Aces | Bill Laimbeer | New York Liberty | 1 | 14–20 | 0 | 0 | 0 |
| Los Angeles Sparks | Derek Fisher | New York Knicks | 0 | 0–0 | 0 | 0 | 0 |
| Minnesota Lynx | Cheryl Reeve | Detroit Shock (assistant) | 8 | 213–93 | 7 | 6 | 4 |
| Phoenix Mercury | Sandy Brondello | Los Angeles Sparks (assistant) | 5 | 103–67 | 5 | 1 | 1 |
| Seattle Storm | Dan Hughes | San Antonio Stars | 1 | 26–8 | 1 | 1 | 1 |

Notes:

- Year with team does not include 2019 season.
- Records are from time at current team and are through the end of the 2018 season.
- Playoff appearances are from time at current team only.
- WNBA Finals and Championships do not include time with other teams.
- Coaches shown are the coaches who began the 2019 season as head coach of each team.
