= Unrivaled =

Unrivaled may refer to:

- Unrivaled (basketball), a professional 3-on-3 women's basketball league
- Unrivaled (film), 2010 American-Canadian action drama film
- Unrivaled: Earnhardt vs. Gordon, a documentary
- Unrivaled: Sewanee 1899, a documentary
- Unrivaled, an upcoming novel by Rachel Reid
