= 2013 Chicago Sky season =

- Head coach: Pokey Chatman
- Arena: Allstate Arena

Results
- Record: 24–10 (.706)
- Place: 1st (Eastern)
- Playoff finish: Lost in Conference Semifinals

Media
- Television: CN100; ESPN2, NBATV

The 2013 Chicago Sky season was the franchise's 8th season in the Women's National Basketball Association, and their third season under head coach Pokey Chatman.

With the addition of Elena Delle Donne, expectations were high for the Sky to finally reach the playoffs. Delle Donne, along with Sylvia Fowles, Epiphanny Prince, Courtney Vandersloot, and Swin Cash finished the regular season with the best record in the Eastern Conference - thus giving the Sky, their first regular season Conference title and the first seed in the 2013 WNBA Playoffs. The Sky were ultimately swept in the Conference Semifinals by the Indiana Fever.

== Transactions ==
=== WNBA draft ===
Round	Pick	Player	Nationality	School/team/country
1	2	Elena Delle Donne	United States	Delaware
3	28	Brooklyn Pope	United States	Baylor

=== Trades and Roster Changes ===
Date	Transaction
January 10, 2013	Extended a Qualifying Offer to Tamera Young
February 18, 2013	Signed Sharnee Zoll to a training-camp contract
March 4, 2013	Signed Allie Quigley to a training-camp contract
March 18, 2013	Signed Tamera Young
March 27, 2013	Signed Michelle Campbell to a training-camp contract
March 29, 2013	Signed D'Andra Moss to a training-camp contract
April 19, 2013	Signed Elena Delle Donne and Brooklyn Pope to rookie-scale contracts
April 29, 2013	Signed Brittany Jones to a training-camp contract
May 10, 2013	Waived Brittany Jones and Brooklyn Pope
May 16, 2013	Waived D'Andra Moss
May 16, 2013	Signed Epiphanny Prince to a Contract Extension
May 18, 2013	Waived Sonja Petrovic
May 23, 2013	Waived Ruth Riley
May 31, 2013	Exercised 4th-Year Team Option on Courtney Vandersloot
June 3, 2013	Temporarily Suspend Epiphanny Prince due to Overseas Commitments
June 19, 2013	Activated Epiphanny Prince from her Temporary Suspension
August 3, 2013	Signed Avery Warley to a 7-day contract
September 11, 2013	Waived Sharnee Zoll
September 11, 2013	Signed Avery Warley

== Roster ==
2013 Chicago Sky roster
Players
Coaches

Pos.	No.	Nat.	Name	Height	Weight	DOB	From	Yrs
F	25	(United States)	Campbell, Michelle	6' 2" (1.88m)	183 lb (83kg)	1984-05-12	Rutgers	R
F	8	(United States)	Cash, Swin	6' 1" (1.85m)	176 lb (80kg)	1979-09-22	Connecticut	11
G/F	11	(United States)	Delle Donne, Elena	6' 5" (1.96m)	188 lb (85kg)	1989-09-05	Delaware	R
C	34	(United States)	Fowles, Sylvia	6' 6" (1.98m)	208 lb (94kg)	1985-10-06	LSU	5
G	7	(United States)	Murphy, Shay	5' 11" (1.8m)	161 lb (73kg)	1985-04-15	USC	6
G	10	(United States)	Prince, Epiphanny	5' 9" (1.75m)	164 lb (74kg)	1988-01-11	Rutgers	3
G	14	(United States)	Quigley, Allie	5' 10" (1.78m)	140 lb (64kg)	1986-06-20	DePaul	4
C	30	(United States)	Swords, Carolyn	6' 6" (1.98m)	212 lb (96kg)	1989-07-19	Boston College	2
G	22	(United States)	Vandersloot, Courtney	5' 8" (1.73m)	132 lb (60kg)	1989-02-08	Gonzaga	2
C	17	(United States)	Warley, Avery	6' 3" (1.91m)	202 lb (92kg)	1989-05-17	Liberty	1
F	1	(United States)	Young, Tamera	6' 2" (1.88m)	172 lb (78kg)	1986-10-30	James Madison	5

Head coach
(United States) Pokey Chatman (LSU)
Assistant coaches
(United States) Tree Rollins (Clemson)
(United States) Christie Sides (Louisiana Tech)
Athletic trainer
(United States) Natalie Meckstroth (Indiana)
Strength and conditioning coach
(United States) Ann Crosby (Western Michigan)

Legend

- (C) Team captain
- (DP) Unsigned draft pick
- (FA) Free agent
- (S) Suspended
- Injured

=== Depth ===
Pos.	Starter	Bench
C	Sylvia Fowles	Avery Warley; Carolyn Swords
PF	Elena Delle Donne	Michelle Campbell
SF	Swin Cash	Tamera Young
SG	Epiphanny Prince	Shay Murphy
PG	Courtney Vandersloot	Allie Quigley

== Schedule ==
=== Preseason ===
2013 Preseason Schedule
Total: 1–0 (Home: 1–0; Road: 1–1)

Game	Date	Opponent	Score	High points	High rebounds	High assists	Location/Attendance	Record
1	May 15	New York	W 85–67	Elena Delle Donne (17)	Sylvia Fowles (7)	Sharnee Zoll (7)	Dickens Athletic Center; 1,250	1-0

2013 pre-season schedule

=== Regular season ===
2013 Regular Season Schedule
Total: 24–10 (Home: 14–3; Road: 10–7)
May: 2–0 (Home: 1–0; Road: 1–0)

Game	Date	Opponent	Score	High points	High rebounds	High assists	Location/Attendance	Record
1	May 27	@ Phoenix	W 102–80	Epiphanny Prince (26)	Sylvia Fowles (10)	Epiphanny Prince (5)	US Airways Center; 10,200	1–0
2	May 31	Connecticut	W 86–75	Sylvia Fowles (24)	Sylvia Fowles (22)	Courtney Vandersloot (7)	Allstate Arena; 6,607	2–0

June: 5–3 (Home: 4–0; Road: 1–3)

Game	Date	Opponent	Score	High points	High rebounds	High assists	Location/Attendance	Record
3	June 2	Tulsa	W 92–71	Epiphanny Prince (19)	Sylvia Fowles (13)	Swin Cash (5)	Allstate Arena; 6,811	3–0
4	June 7	@ San Antonio	L 69–81	Elena Delle Donne (17)	Sylvia Fowles (13)	Cash; Zoll (3)	AT&T Center; 6,244	3–1
5	June 9	San Antonio	W 72–70	Elena Delle Donne (23)	Sylvia Fowles (16)	Courtney Vandersloot (5)	Allstate Arena; 4,293	4–1
6	June 16	@ Atlanta	L 74–88	Elena Delle Donne (25)	Sylvia Fowles (10)	Courtney Vandersloot (7)	Philips Arena; 5,552	4–2
7	June 20	@ Tulsa	L 74–83	Sylvia Fowles (17)	Sylvia Fowles (12)	Courtney Vandersloot (5)	BOK Center; 4,161	4–3
8	June 22	@ Indiana	W 71–61	Epiphanny Prince (21)	Swin Cash (8)	Courtney Vandersloot (4)	Bankers Life Fieldhouse; 7,934	5–3
9	June 26	NY Liberty	W 87–74	Elena Delle Donne (26)	Sylvia Fowles (14)	Elena Delle Donne (6)	Allstate Arena; 8,911	6–3
10	June 29	Los Angeles	W 94–82	Epiphanny Prince (21)	Elena Delle Donne (8)	Courtney Vandersloot (4)	Allstate Arena; 6,885	7–3

July: 5–2 (Home: 2–1; Road: 3–1)

Game	Date	Opponent	Score	High points	High rebounds	High assists	Location/Attendance	Record
11	July 2	Seattle	L 60–69	Prince; Delle Donne (12)	Swin Cash (14)	Courtney Vandersloot (3)	Allstate Arena; 5,808	7–4
12	July 7	@ NY Liberty	W 93–64	Elena Delle Donne (20)	Carolyn Swords (7)	Courtney Vandersloot (3)	Prudential Center; 7,127	8–4
13	July 10	Washington	W 89–85	Sylvia Fowles (26)	Sylvia Fowles (18)	Courtney Vandersloot (6)	Allstate Arena; 14,201	9–4
14	July 12	@ Connecticut	W 83–70	Elena Delle Donne (23)	Cash; Fowles (8)	Courtney Vandersloot (7)	Mohegan Sun Arena; 6,285	10–4
15	July 18	@ NY Liberty	W 75–55	Elena Delle Donne (23)	Delle Donne; Prince; Young (6)	Courtney Vandersloot (8)	Prudential Center; 12,858	11–4
16	July 20	NY Liberty	W 80–69	Tamera Young (17)	Sylvia Fowles (13)	Courtney Vandersloot (9)	Allstate Arena; 6,037	12–4
17	July 24	@ Washington	L 78–82	Sylvia Fowles (21)	Sylvia Fowles (9)	Courtney Vandersloot (4)	Verizon Center; 14,411	12–5

August: 9–3 (Home: 5–1; Road: 4–2)

Game	Date	Opponent	Score	High points	High rebounds	High assists	Location/Attendance	Record
All-Star Break
18	August 2	Washington	W 85–78	Sylvia Fowles (32)	Sylvia Fowles (15)	Courtney Vandersloot (9)	Allstate Arena; 5,134	13–5
19	August 3	@ Indiana	L 58–79	Courtney Vandersloot (11)	Avery Warley (8)	Cash; Prince (2)	Bankers Life Fieldhouse; 8,610	13–6
20	August 6	Indiana	L 58–64	Sylvia Fowles (14)	Sylvia Fowles (17)	Prince; Vandersloot (3)	Allstate Arena; 4,135	13–7
21	August 9	@ Connecticut	W 77–61	Epiphanny Prince (23)	Sylvia Fowles (10)	Epiphanny Prince (4)	Mohegan Sun Arena; 6,086	14–7
22	August 11	Minnesota	W 94–86 (OT)	Elena Delle Donne (32)	Sylvia Fowles (9)	Courtney Vandersloot (9)	Allstate Arena; 6,297	15–7
23	August 13	@ Los Angeles	L 76–80	Sylvia Fowles (22)	Sylvia Fowles (9)	Courtney Vandersloot (6)	Staples Center; 10,553	15–8
24	August 15	@ Seattle	W 79–66	Swin Cash (18)	Sylvia Fowles (10)	Courtney Vandersloot (8)	Key Arena; 6,829	16–8
25	August 18	Connecticut	W 89–78	Epiphanny Prince (21)	Sylvia Fowles (21)	Epiphanny Prince (8)	Allstate Arena; 5,074	17–8
26	August 20	@ Washington	W 79–73	Elena Delle Donne (24)	Sylvia Fowles (15)	Courtney Vandersloot (7)	Verizon Center; 6,471	18–8
27	August 23	NY Liberty	W 82–64	Sylvia Fowles (14)	Fowles; Campbell; Warley (7)	Courtney Vandersloot (7)	Allstate Arena; 5,888	19–8
28	August 24	@ Atlanta	W 67–56	Elena Delle Donne (25)	Sylvia Fowles (13)	Courtney Vandersloot (10)	Philips Arena; 7,412	20–8
29	August 31	Atlanta	W 85–68	Sylvia Fowles (18)	Delle Donne; Warley (7)	Courtney Vandersloot (9)	Allstate Arena; 6,047	21–8

September: 3–2 (Home: 2–1; Road: 1–1)

Game	Date	Opponent	Score	High points	High rebounds	High assists	Location/Attendance	Record
30	September 6	Indiana	L 77–82	Sylvia Fowles (23)	Tamera Young (10)	Swin Cash (4)	Allstate Arena; 5,996	21–9
31	September 8	@ Washington	W 93–79	Elena Delle Donne (22)	Sylvia Fowles (9)	Courtney Vandersloot (6)	Verizon Center; 9,060	22–9
32	September 11	Phoenix	W 70–68	Epiphanny Prince (21)	Sylvia Fowles (12)	Courtney Vandersloot (6)	Allstate Arena; 6,409	23–9
33	September 13	Atlanta	W 87–82	Epiphanny Prince (29)	Sylvia Fowles (18)	Epiphanny Prince (7)	Allstate Arena; 7,679	24–9
34	September 14	@ Minnesota	L 66–79	Sylvia Fowles (17)	Sylvia Fowles (11)	Swin Cash (6)	Target Center; 9,613	24–10

2013 season schedule

=== Playoffs ===
2012 Playoff Schedule
Conference Semifinals vs. Indiana (Lost Series 0-2)

Game	Date	Opponent	Score	High points	High rebounds	High assists	Location/Attendance	Record
1	September 20	Indiana	L 72–85	Elena Delle Donne (20)	Sylvia Fowles (10)	Courtney Vandersloot (7)	Allstate Arena; 5895	0–1
2	September 22	@ Indiana	L 57–79	Sylvia Fowles (14)	Sylvia Fowles (14)	Vandersloot & Delle Donne (2)	Bankers Life Fieldhouse; 7144	0–2

2013 season schedule

== Standings ==
#	Eastern Conference					
#	Team	W	L	PCT	GB	GP
1	z-Chicago Sky	24	10	.706	-	34
2	x-Atlanta Dream	17	17	.500	7	34
3	x-Washington Mystics	17	17	.500	7	34
4	x-Indiana Fever	16	18	.471	8	34
5	e-New York Liberty	11	23	.324	13	34
6	e-Connecticut Sun	10	24	.294	14	34

== Playoffs ==
**Conference semifinals** Best-of-3
E1	Chicago	0
E4	**Indiana**	**2**
Eastern Conference
E2	**Atlanta**	**2**
E3	Washington	1
W1	**Minnesota**	**2**
W4	Seattle	0
Western Conference
W2	Los Angeles	1
W3	**Phoenix**	**2**

**Conference finals** Best-of-3
E4	Indiana	0
E2	**Atlanta**	**2**
W1	**Minnesota**	**2**
W3	Phoenix	0

**WNBA Finals**; Best-of-5
E2	Atlanta	0
W1	**Minnesota**	**3**

- **Bold** – Series winner
- Italics – Team with home-court advantage

== Statistics ==
Legend
GP	Games played	GS	Games started	MPG	Minutes per game	RPG	Rebounds per game
APG	Assists per game	SPG	Steals per game	BPG	Blocks per game	PPG	Points per game
FG%	Field-goal percentage	3P%	3-point field-goal percentage	FT%	Free-throw percentage	TO	Turnovers per game
PF	Fouls per game		Team leader		League leader

=== Regular season ===
Player	GP	GS	MPG	FG%	3P%	FT%	RPG	APG	SPG	BPG	PPG
Elena Delle Donne	30	30	31.4	42.6	43.8	92.9	5.6	1.8	0.7	1.8	18.1
Sylvia Fowles	32	32	31.3	58.6	0.0	68.5	11.5	0.4	0.9	2.4	16.3
Epiphanny Prince	31	31	30.0	37.6	39.6	90.0	2.7	3.0	1.7	0.4	15.0
Swin Cash	34	34	28.3	41.5	27.0	85.3	5.6	2.2	0.9	0.6	9.3
Courtney Vandersloot	33	33	29.8	39.6	30.4	83.3	3.2	5.6	1.4	0.9	8.8
Tamera Young	33	8	18.1	42.6	0.0	60.5	3.8	0.6	0.5	0.1	5.6
Allie Quigley	34	0	9.4	31.6	31.5	88.9	0.7	0.6	0.4	0.1	3.8
Carolyn Swords	16	2	11.3	61.9	0.0	77.8	2.6	0.6	0.5	0.8	3.7
Shay Murphy	34	0	11.1	29.2	17.2	79.2	1.9	0.3	0.6	0.0	3.1
Michelle Campbell	31	0	7.7	31.4	0.0	73.3	1.5	0.2	0.2	0.2	1.7
Avery Warley	14	0	8.1	43.8	0.0	100.0	2.1	0.1	0.2	0.4	1.3
Sharnee Zoll	19	0	9.7	21.4	0.0	62.5	0.7	1.7	0.2	0.0	0.9

=== Playoffs ===
Player	GP	GS	MPG	FG%	3P%	FT%	RPG	APG	SPG	BPG	PPG
Sylvia Fowles	2	2	35.5	46.2	0.0	54.5	12.0	0.5	2.0	2.0	15.0
Elena Delle Donne	2	2	32.0	38.1	0.0	100.0	3.5	2.0	0.5	2.0	15.0
Epiphanny Prince	2	2	33.5	33.3	28.6	100.0	1.5	0.5	1.5	0.0	14.5
Courtney Vandersloot	2	2	29.5	30.0	0.0	100.0	2.0	4.5	1.0	0.5	7.0
Swin Cash	2	2	27.5	33.3	0.0	87.5	1.5	1.0	1.5	0.5	5.5
Tamera Young	2	0	16.5	40.0	0.0	75.0	1.5	1.0	1.0	0.0	3.5
Allie Quigley	2	0	12.5	25.0	50.0	0.0	0.0	1.5	0.0	0.0	2.5
Shay Murphy	2	0	8.0	50.0	100.0	0.0	1.5	0.5	0.0	0.0	1.5
Avery Warley	2	0	4.5	0.0	0.0	0.0	2.0	0.5	0.0	0.0	0.0
Michelle Campbell	1	0	1.0	0.0	0.0	0.0	0.0	0.0	0.0	0.0	0.0

== Awards and honors ==
Recipient	Award	Date awarded	Ref.
Elena Delle Donne	Eastern Conference Player of the Week	July 1	
Elena Delle Donne	Eastern Conference Player of the Week	July 8	
Elena Delle Donne	Eastern Conference Player of the Week	August 12	
Elena Delle Donne	Eastern Conference Player of the Week	August 26	
Elena Delle Donne	Rookie of the Month	June	
Elena Delle Donne	Rookie of the Month	July	
Elena Delle Donne	Rookie of the Month	August	
Elena Delle Donne	Rookie of the Month	September	
Elena Delle Donne	WNBA All-Star Starter	July 18	
Elena Delle Donne	WNBA Rookie of the Year	September 20	
Elena Delle Donne	WNBA All-Rookie Team	September 20	
Elena Delle Donne	All-WNBA Second Team	September 25	
Sylvia Fowles	Eastern Conference Player of the Week	July 15	
Sylvia Fowles	Eastern Conference Player of the Week	August 19	
Sylvia Fowles	Eastern Conference Player of the Month	July	
Sylvia Fowles	Eastern Conference Player of the Month	August	
Sylvia Fowles	Eastern Conference Player of the Month	September	
Sylvia Fowles	WNBA All-Star Selection	July 23	
Sylvia Fowles	Peak Performer: Rebounds	September	
Sylvia Fowles	WNBA Defensive Player of the Year	September 20	
Sylvia Fowles	All-Defensive First Team	September 20	
Sylvia Fowles	All-WNBA First Team	September 25	
Epiphanny Prince	WNBA All-Star Starter	July 18	
Swin Cash	Kim Perrot Sportsmanship Award	September 20	
