= Avery Warley-Talbert =

American basketball player (born 1987)

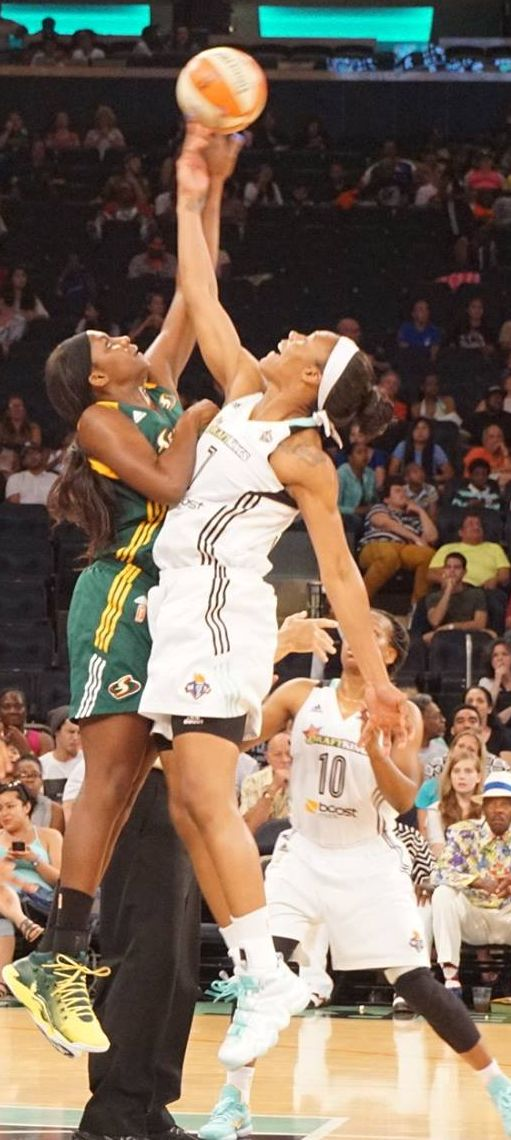

Personal information
- Born: May 17, 1987 (age 39) Washington D.C.
- Listed height: 6 ft 3 in (1.91 m)
- Listed weight: 202 lb (92 kg)

Career information
- High school: H. D. Woodson (Washington D.C.)
- College: Liberty (2008–2012)
- WNBA draft: 2012: undrafted
- Playing career: 2012–present
- Position: Center

Career history
- 2012: Phoenix Mercury
- 2013: New York Liberty
- 2013: Chicago Sky
- 2014–2015: New York Liberty
- 2016: Atlanta Dream
- 2016: San Antonio Stars
- 2019: New York Liberty
- 2020: Las Vegas Aces

Career highlights
- Big South Defensive Player of the Year (2011); 3x First-team All-Big South (2010–2012)
- Stats at WNBA.com
- Stats at Basketball Reference

Avery Rochelle Warley-Talbert (born May 17, 1987), is an American professional basketball player. After playing college basketball for Liberty University, Warley-Talbert was signed by the Phoenix Mercury of the WNBA as an undrafted free agent in 2012. She has also played for the Chicago Sky, New York Liberty, Atlanta Dream, and San Antonio Stars. She is currently a free agent after being waived by the Las Vegas Aces on August 8, 2020.

== USA Basketball ==
Born in Washington D.C., Warley was selected to represent the US at the 2011 Pan American Games held in Guadalajara, Mexico. The USA team lost their first two games in close contests, losing to Argentina 58–55 and Puerto Rico 75–70. The team rebounded to win their games against Mexico and Jamaica, but the 2–2 overall record left them in seventh place. Warley averaged 2.5 points per game.

== Career statistics ==
Legend
GP	Games played	GS	Games started	MPG	Minutes per game	RPG	Rebounds per game
APG	Assists per game	SPG	Steals per game	BPG	Blocks per game	PPG	Points per game
TO	Turnovers per game	FG%	Field-goal percentage	3P%	3-point field-goal percentage	FT%	Free-throw percentage
**Bold**	Career best	°	League leader

=== WNBA ===
==== Regular season ====
WNBA regular season statistics
Year	Team	GP	GS	MPG	FG%	3P%	FT%	RPG	APG	SPG	BPG	TO	PPG
2012	Phoenix	**28**	3	**17.8**	47.1	—	58.8	**5.7**	0.2	0.4	0.5	1.1	3.1
2013	New York	8	5	12.8	40.0	—	66.7	4.9	0.1	**0.6**	0.1	0.8	3.0
2013	Chicago	14	0	8.1	43.8	—	**100.0**	2.1	0.1	0.2	0.4	**0.4**	1.3
2014	New York	**28**	**23**	15.8	**48.9**	—	83.3	3.8	0.1	0.4	0.4	1.0	**4.2**
2015	New York	26	0	6.9	35.1	—	66.7	2.7	0.2	0.3	0.1	0.8	1.5
2016	Atlanta	1	0	4.0	0.0	—	—	1.0	0.0	0.0	0.0	1.0	0.0
2016	San Antonio	2	0	5.5	0.0	—	—	1.0	0.5	0.0	0.5	0.0	0.0
2017	Did not play (did not appear in WNBA)												
2018	Did not play (did not appear in WNBA)												
2019	New York	3	0	11.7	20.0	—	50.0	2.3	0.0	0.0	**0.7**	1.3	1.0
2020	Las Vegas	3	0	8.0	42.9	—	66.7	2.7	**1.0**	0.0	0.0	0.7	2.7
**Career**	7 years, 5 teams	113	31	12.5	44.0	—	70.1	3.7	0.2	0.3	0.3	0.9	2.6

==== Playoffs ====
WNBA playoff statistics
Year	Team	GP	GS	MPG	FG%	3P%	FT%	RPG	APG	SPG	BPG	TO	PPG
2013	Chicago	2	0	4.5	0.0	—	—	**2.0**	**0.5**	0.0	0.0	0.0	0.0
2015	New York	**4**	**1**	**5.0**	**66.7**	—	**50.0**	0.5	0.0	**0.3**	0.0	0.0	**1.3**
**Career**	2 years, 2 teams	6	1	4.8	33.3	—	50.0	1.0	0.2	0.2	0.0	0.0	0.8

=== College ===
NCAA statistics
Year	Team	GP	Points	FG%	3P%	FT%	RPG	APG	SPG	BPG	PPG
2008-09	Liberty	**33**	266	**62.6**	-	51.9	7.8	0.3	0.7	1.4	8.1
2009-10	Liberty	**33**	364	60.3	-	56.4	8.5	0.4	1.0	0.8	11.0
2010-11	Liberty	**33**	397	62.0	-	63.0	11.0	**0.8**	1.0	1.2	12.0
2011-12	Liberty	**33**	**426**	57.4	-	**68.3**	**11.5**	0.6	1.0	**1.7**	**12.9**
**Career**		132	1453	60.3	0.0	61.4	9.7	0.5	0.9	1.3	11.0

== Bibliography ==
- Career statistics from WNBA.com · Basketball Reference
