= Elena Delle Donne =

American basketball player (born 1989)

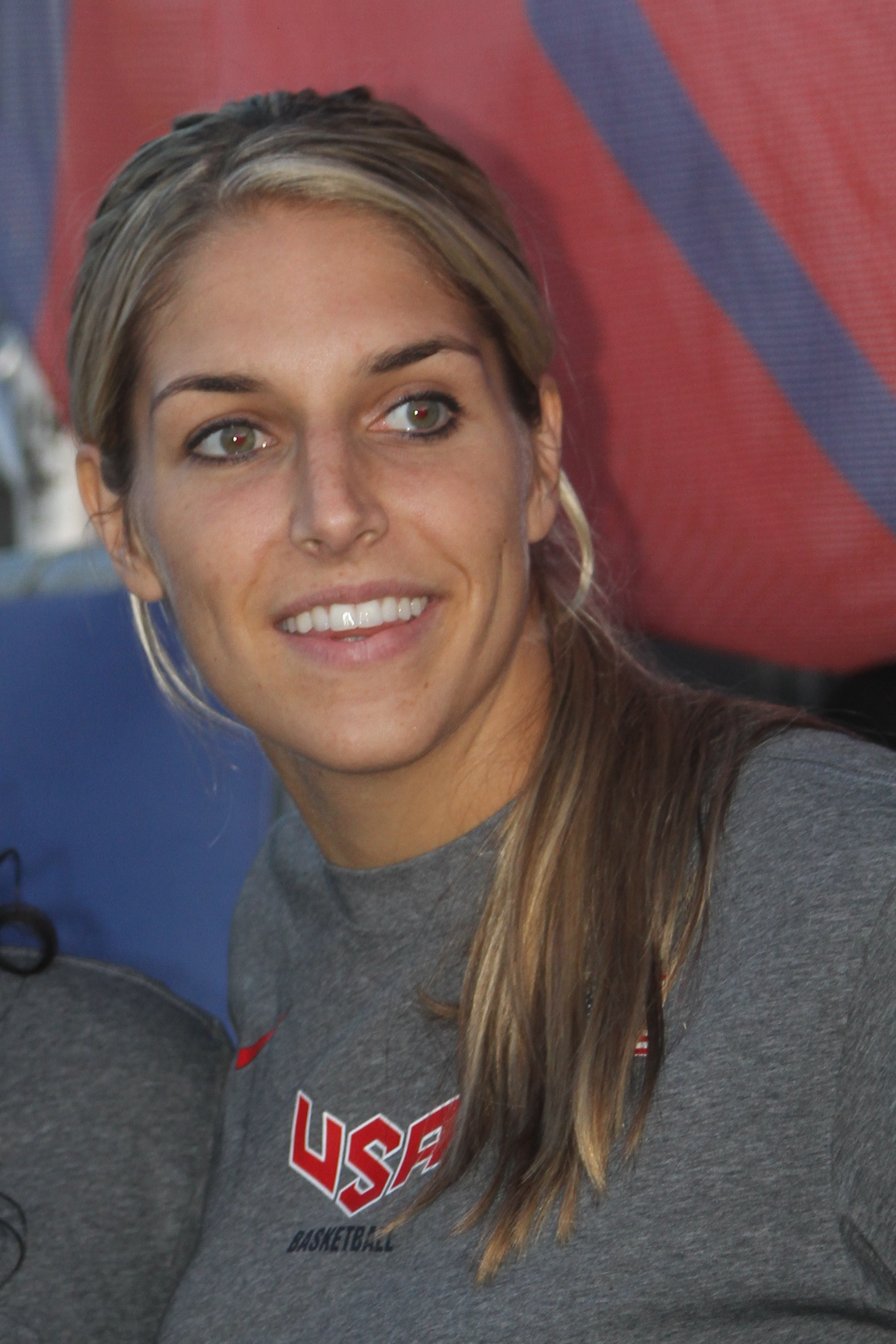
- Delle Donne at the 2014 World Basketball Festival

Personal information
- Born: September 5, 1989 (age 37) Wilmington, Delaware, U.S.
- Listed height: 6 ft 5 in (1.96 m)
- Listed weight: 187 lb (85 kg)

Career information
- High school: Ursuline Academy (Wilmington, Delaware)
- College: Delaware (2009–2013)
- WNBA draft: 2013: 1st round, 2nd overall pick
- Drafted by: Chicago Sky
- Playing career: 2013–2023
- Position: Small forward / shooting guard

Career history
- 2013–2016: Chicago Sky
- 2017–2019, 2021–2023: Washington Mystics

Career highlights
- WNBA champion (2019); 2× WNBA MVP (2015, 2019); 7× WNBA All-Star (2013–2015, 2017–2019, 2023); 4× All-WNBA First Team (2015, 2016, 2018, 2019); All-WNBA Second Team (2013); WNBA 25th Anniversary Team (2021); WNBA scoring champion (2015); WNBA Peak Performer (2015); 50–40–90 club (2019); WNBA Rookie of the Year (2013); WNBA All-Rookie Team (2013); Honda Sports Award (2013); Senior CLASS Award (2013); 2× Women's Basketball Academic All-American of the Year (2012, 2013); 2× All-American – WBCA, USBWA (2012, 2013); 2× First-team All-American – AP (2012, 2013); Third-team All-American – AP (2010); NCAA season scoring leader (2012); 3× CAA Player of the Year (2010, 2012, 2013); CAA Freshman of the Year (2010); 4× First-team All-CAA (2010–2013); 3× CAA All-Defensive Team (2010, 2012, 2013); CAA All-Freshman Team (2010); Naismith Prep Player of the Year (2008); Morgan Wootten Player of the Year (2008); McDonald's All-American (2008)
- Stats at WNBA.com
- Stats at Basketball Reference
- Women's Basketball Hall of Fame
Medals
Women's basketball
Representing the United States
Olympic Games
Gold medal – first place	2016 Rio de Janeiro	Team
World Cup
Gold medal – first place	2018 Spain	Team
World University Games
Gold medal – first place	2011 Shenzhen	Team

Elena Delle Donne (born September 5, 1989) is an American former professional basketball player. Delle Donne played college basketball for the Delaware Blue Hens from 2009 to 2013. She was drafted by the Chicago Sky with the second overall pick of the 2013 WNBA draft, and led the Sky to the 2014 WNBA Finals, where they were defeated by the Phoenix Mercury. Delle Donne was traded to the Washington Mystics in 2017 and led them to their first WNBA championship in 2019. She was inducted into the Naismith Basketball Hall of Fame in 2026.

Delle Donne has won two WNBA Most Valuable Player Awards (2015, 2019), been selected to seven All-Star teams, and was the first WNBA player to join the 50–40–90 club. She was named to The W25, the league's list of the top 25 players of its first 25 years, in 2021. She is the all-time leader in WNBA career free throw percentage with a mark of 93.7%. Delle Donne was announced as a member of the 2026 induction class of the Naismith Basketball Hall of Fame that April, with induction to follow in August.

== Early life ==
Delle Donne's father, who played college golf, is 6 ft 6 in (1.98 m), and her mother is 6 ft 2 in (1.88 m). Her childhood was marked by a struggle to come to terms with her unusual height. According to a 2016 ESPN story, her first memory was going on a shopping trip when she was three years old and hearing other shoppers tell her mother that an 8-year-old should not be using a pacifier. In third grade, her class was assigned to measure themselves using lengths of paper; she was "humiliated" when her paper extended well beyond those of her classmates. Within two years of that incident, a doctor wanted to start her on injections to stunt her growth; her mother refused. By the time she was in eighth grade, she was already 6 ft 0 in (1.83 m). Additionally, according to the same ESPN piece Delle Donne had to come to terms with having "a body that could do a great many things that the body of her older sister, Lizzie, couldn't." Lizzie was born deaf and blind, is unable to speak, and also has cerebral palsy and autism. In another 2016 ESPN story, Delle Donne credits her mother with helping her accept her height:

She's 6–2 and my dad is 6–6, so she understood. She was like, "I'm telling you, one day you are going to realize how beautiful your height is." She would always tell me how unique I am and say, "Why try to be like the rest of the pack? Be your own person."

== High school career ==
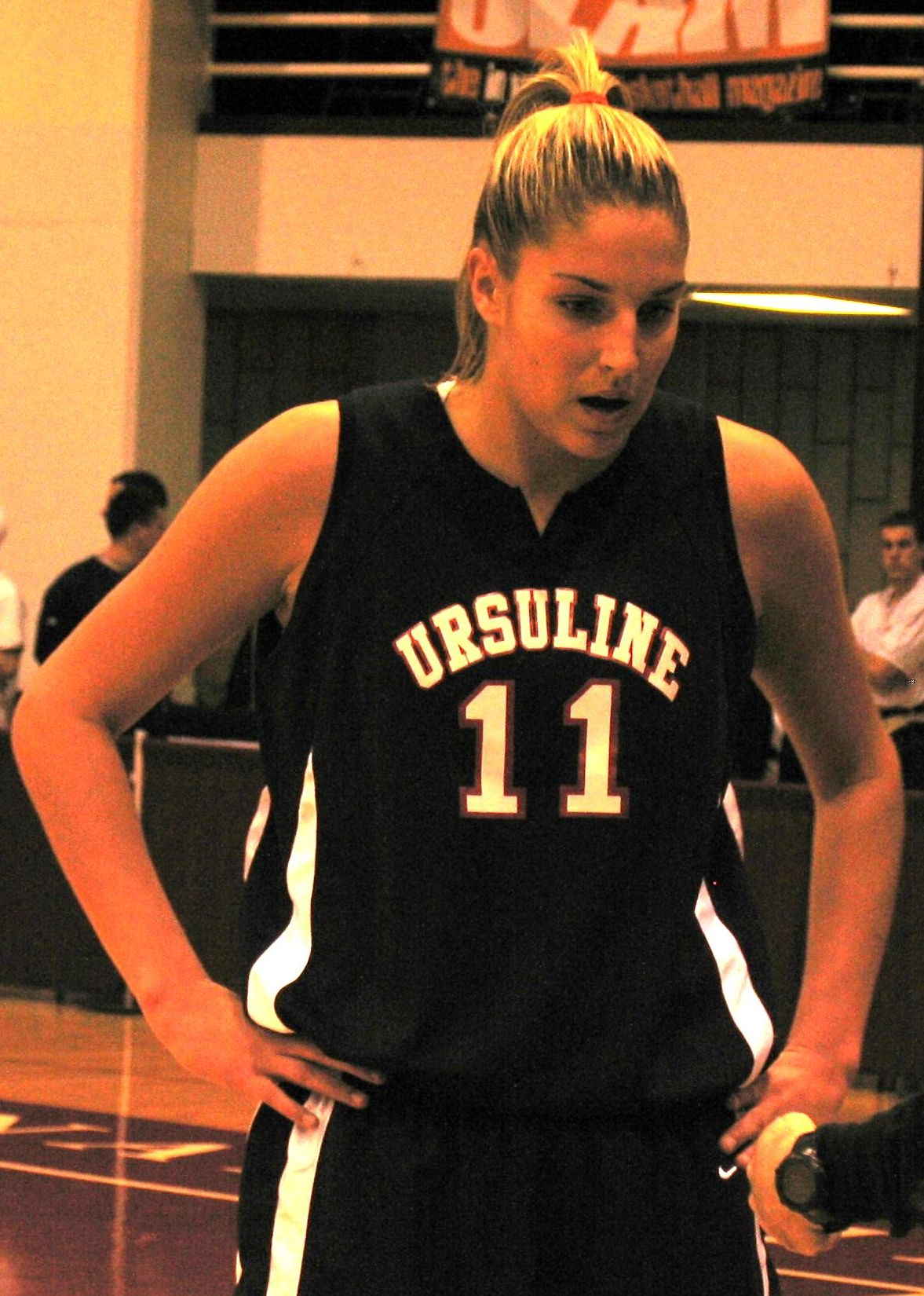
Delle Donne playing for the Ursuline Academy Raiders in 2008

Delle Donne gained national recognition as a high school basketball star at Ursuline Academy in Wilmington, Delaware. She led Ursuline to three straight Delaware State Championship titles and was ranked as the number-one overall high school recruit by Scout.com as well as a McDonald's All-American. She was the first and only student at Ursuline so far to score 2,000+ points during her high school career and also set the girls' high school national record for consecutive free throws made (80) in 2005–2006.

Delle Donne was also named a WBCA All-American. She participated in the 2007 WBCA High School All-America Game, where she scored 17 points, and earned MVP honors for the Red team.

She also participated in volleyball. Delle Donne won the volleyball DIAA state championship with Ursuline in 2007. She posted a season high 20 kills against Padua during a game involving the number one and two teams in the state.

== College career ==
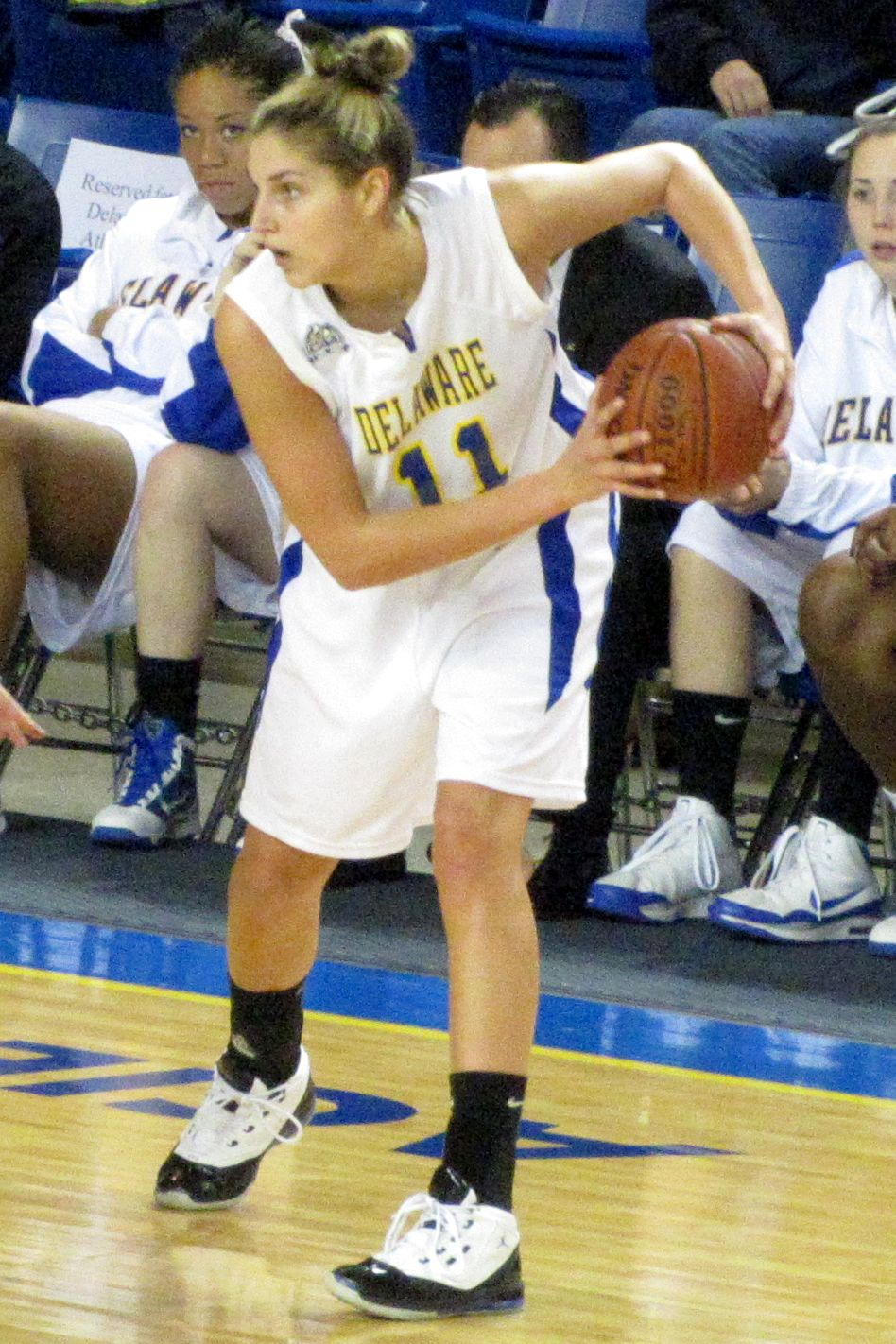
Delle Donne playing for the Delaware Fightin' Blue Hens in 2010

Following an outstanding prep career during which she became the most highly touted women's basketball recruit since Candace Parker, Delle Donne received a basketball scholarship from the University of Connecticut. However, in early June 2008, Delle Donne abruptly dropped out of Connecticut's summer school program after just two days. Delle Donne was very close to her family, especially her older sister, and was not ready to be separated from her family. Gene, Elena's brother and the middle child of the Delle Donne family, stated in a 2012 ESPN story on his younger sister:

Her relationship with Lizzie is huge. It's so close. It's a big reason why she is such a homebody who came home from UConn, because she craves to be around Lizzie and to experience Lizzie grabbing her and sniffing her and just spend quality time with her.

A week after leaving Connecticut, Delle Donne said by telephone from her home in Wilmington that she has "a lot of personal issues to fix. Only my family understands what's going on. Right now I am going to take a long personal break." She took a similar break prior to the 2007–08 season in high school.

On August 16, 2008, Delle Donne announced she would not accept the scholarship due to burnout, and instead decided to enroll at the University of Delaware and join their volleyball team as a walk-on. She played middle hitter at UD for the 2008–09 season. The 2008 Delaware Blue Hens finished their season with a record of 19–16. They were 9–5 in their conference (Colonial Athletic Association) and won the conference tournament. They earned a spot in the NCAA Tournament, but lost to Oregon in the first round. Delle Donne did not continue on the volleyball team in 2009, but joined the basketball team.

On June 2, 2009, Delle Donne announced that she would play basketball for the Blue Hens in the 2009–10 season as a redshirt freshman. In 2012, ESPN writer Graham Hays said about her return to the sport "it cannot be complete coincidence that it came the year Gene returned to Delaware and went to work for his dad's company." In a 2016 interview with ESPN, Delle Donne also recalled a trip she took during the summer of 2009 to the school that Lizzie was attending. While there, she met another woman at the school, a basketball fan who used a wheelchair due to cerebral palsy, who told her, "Elena, do everything you can with your abilities, just like we do."

Delle Donne had a very productive freshman season. She averaged 26.7 points per game, the third-highest of all Division I women's basketball players. She scored 54 points in a loss against James Madison on February 18, 2010, which was the highest single-game point total by any Division I female basketball player that season. She was named the CAA Rookie of the Week six times, and the player of the week once during 2009–10.

She was voted the CAA's "Player of the Year" and "Rookie of the Year" in women's basketball by CAA coaches, sports information directors and media. This was the first time a player had won both awards in one year since Old Dominion's Lucienne Berthieu did so in 1999. No men's player has ever won both awards in the same season.

In her sophomore season, the team started off well, but then Delle Donne began to develop flu-like symptoms. In a game against Penn State, she asked to be taken out of the game, something she had never done before. After many tests, the doctors finally diagnosed her with Lyme disease. She struggled the rest of the season, but she helped her team reach the finals of the conference tournament and an invitation to the Women's NIT.

As a junior, Delle Donne led the nation in scoring, finishing the season with an average of 28.1 points per game. Her prowess attracted many fans to the Blue Hens games, with attendance rising 250 percent from the previous year. On February 16, 2012, Delle Donne scored 42 points in a win over Hofstra, eclipsing the 2,000 point mark for her career. Delaware were the CAA champions, qualifying for the 2012 NCAA Women's Division I Basketball Tournament. Delle Donne scored 39 out of the Blue Hens' first 56 points in their first round victory over UALR. Delaware led at halftime against Kansas in the next game, but despite Delle Donne's 34 points, the Jayhawks still won.

During the 2012–13 season, Delle Donne again fought Lyme disease, missing four games due to the illness. Delle Donne returned on December 12 against Maryland and led the team with 19 points and 6 rebounds in a 69–53 loss. This game was the largest crowd (5,089) to ever to see a women's basketball game at the Bob Carpenter Center, the Blue Hens' homecourt.

Delle Donne led her team in scoring in 22 regular season games during her senior season, as well as in rebounds in 12 games. She scored more than 30 points on five occasions, leading her team to a 27–3 regular season record entering CAA conference tournament play.

After winning the CAA conference tournament, the Blue Hens were the #6 seed in their region of the 2013 NCAA Women's Division I Basketball Tournament. Delle Donne led them to victories over #11 West Virginia and #3 North Carolina. The Blue Hens then lost to No. 2 Kentucky, despite Delle Donne's 33 points.

== WNBA career ==
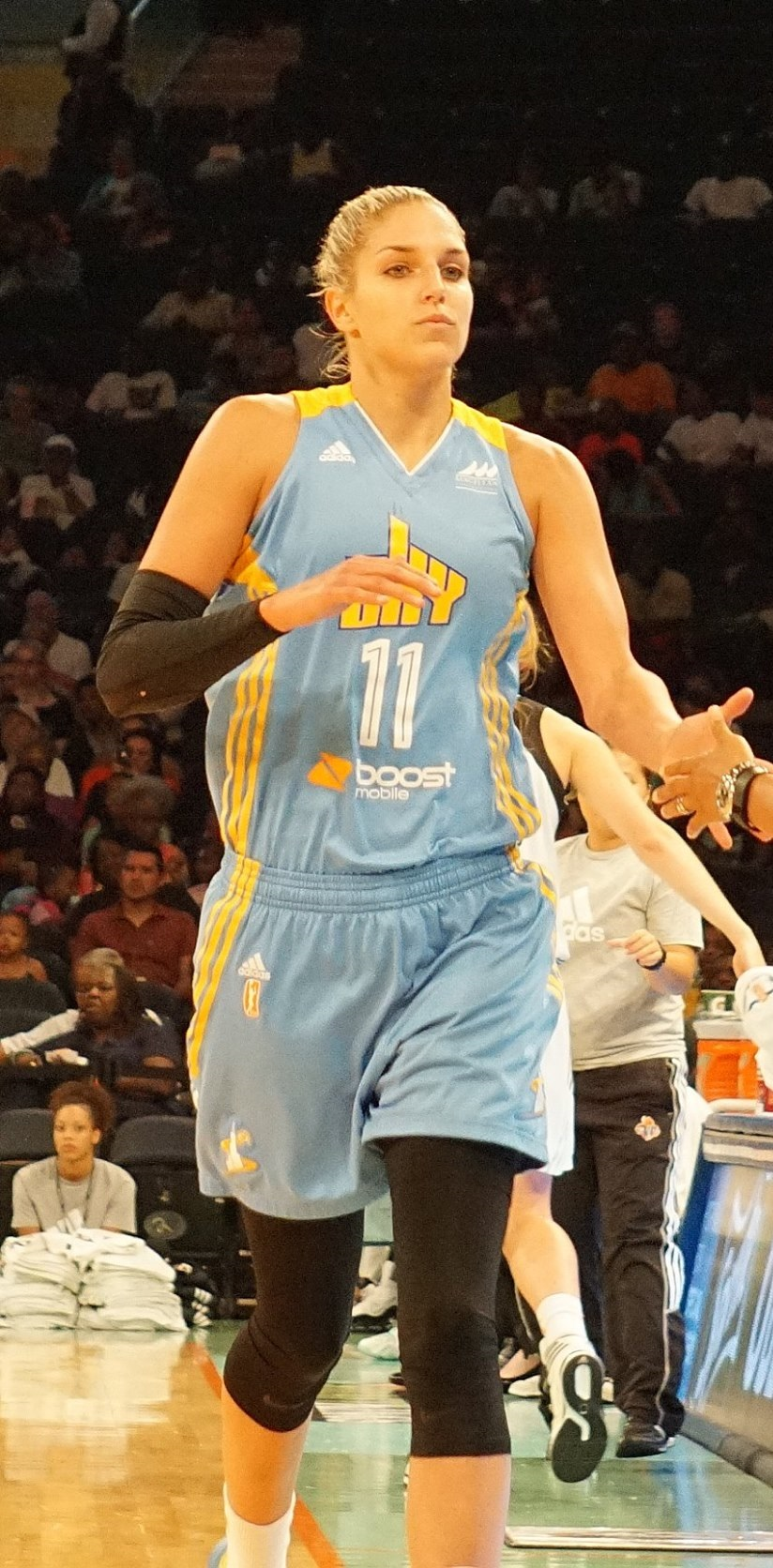
Delle Donne at Madison Square Garden, in the Chicago Sky's win over the New York Liberty in 2015.

=== Chicago Sky (2013–2017) ===
Following her collegiate career, Delle Donne was one of twelve players to be invited to the 2013 WNBA draft. She was selected second overall in that draft by the Chicago Sky, a team that went 14–20 in the 2012 season. In her professional debut, Delle Donne scored 22 points against fellow rookie Brittney Griner and the Phoenix Mercury, in a 102–80 victory. She led all players in votes for the 2013 WNBA All-Star Game, the first time a rookie had done so in league history. However, a concussion forced her to miss the game. After the All-Star break, Delle Donne returned to action, and continued to play at a high level. The Sky not only qualified for the playoffs for the first time in franchise history, but they also earned the top seed in the Eastern Conference. Delle Donne was named the 2013 Rookie of the Year.

The 2014 regular season had Delle Donne playing only 16 games due to a flare-up of Lyme disease, averaging less than 19 minutes in the final seven games. Eventually, she rose up during the playoffs, helping the Sky defeat the Atlanta Dream in the first round, scoring 34 points—including a game-winning shot with 8.2 seconds left in overtime—as the Sky erased a 17-point deficit with 8:12 left in regulation in the deciding game. However, Delle Donne was elbowed while going for a rebound in the Atlanta series, and suffered a back injury that reduced her play time in the following round against the Indiana Fever. The Sky still got to the WNBA finals, but they lost to the Phoenix Mercury. Delle Donne played only ten minutes in the first game; she took medication to play 68 minutes and score 45 points over the final two games.

On September 16, 2015, Delle Donne was named the WNBA MVP for the 2015 season. She scored a league-high 23.4 points per game, shot a career-high 95% from the free throw line, and was ranked third in the league in rebounding. She received 38 of 39 first-place votes. During the regular season, Delle Donne scored a career-high 45 points in an overtime win against the Atlanta Dream, while making 19 consecutive free throws, a WNBA record.

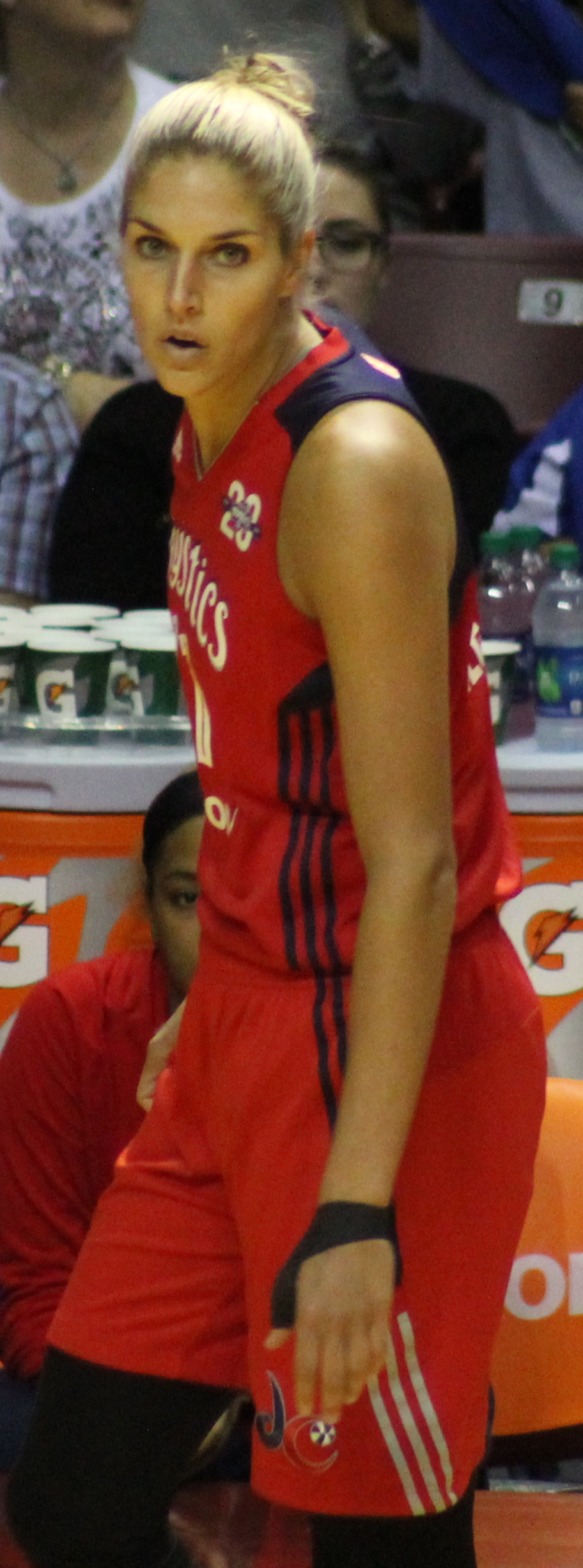
Delle Donne with the Washington Mystics, 2017 WNBA semifinals

Delle Donne has played in two NBA All-Star Celebrity Games, in 2014 and 2016.

In the 2016 season, Delle Donne averaged 21.5 points per game, helping the Sky to another playoff berth as they finished 18–16. With the WNBA's new playoff format in effect, the Sky were the No. 4 seed in the league, which earned them a bye to the second round. Unfortunately, Delle Donne had suffered an injury on her right thumb in a loss to the Washington Mystics. Delle Donne had season-ending surgery that kept her out for the playoffs. Delle Donne played 28 games in the season before the injury. Without Delle Donne, the Sky still had a decent playoff run, advancing to the semifinals (the last round before the WNBA finals) where they lost 3–1 to the eventual champion Los Angeles Sparks.

=== Washington Mystics (2017–2023) ===
With Delle Donne approaching restricted free agent status and her rookie contract expiring in the 2017 offseason, she was traded to the Washington Mystics in exchange for Stefanie Dolson, Kahleah Copper and the second overall pick in the 2017 WNBA draft just a couple days before the start of free agency.

On May 14, 2017, Delle Donne made her debut for the Mystics, scoring a team-high 26 points in an 89–74 win over the San Antonio Stars. On May 19, 2017, Delle Donne scored a season-high 27 points in a 99–89 loss to the Los Angeles Sparks. During Emma Meesseman's absence, Delle Donne played outside her natural position as the starting power forward for the Mystics. On July 14, 2017, Delle Donne suffered a sprained right ankle in a game against Indiana Fever, which caused her to miss the 2017 WNBA All-Star Game. On July 25, 2017, Delle Donne scored a new season-high of 29 points along with 10 rebounds in an 85–76 win against the San Antonio Stars after returning from her ankle injury. On August 1, 2017, Delle Donne suffered a left thumb injury while playing against the Atlanta Dream and was ruled out for two weeks. On August 25, 2017, she returned and scored 15 points in a 74–66 loss to the New York Liberty. On September 1, 2017, Delle Donne scored a new season-high of 37 points along with a career-high 6 three-pointers in a 110–106 overtime win against the Seattle Storm as the Mystics secured a playoff berth as the No. 6 seed in the league with an 18–16 record. In the first round elimination game, the Mystics defeated the Dallas Wings 86–76, Delle Donne scored 25 points and grabbed 11 rebounds. They advanced to the second round elimination game, where they defeated the #3-seeded New York Liberty, 82–68, advancing to the semi-finals, making it the first time in franchise history where the Mystics have advanced past the second round. Delle Donne scored 18 points and grabbed 10 rebounds in the win. In the semi-finals, the Mystics were defeated by the Minnesota Lynx in a 3-game sweep.

In the 2018 season, with Meesseman sitting out the season to play for Team Belgium in the FIBA World Tournament, Delle Donne played at the power forward position in the starting lineup. On June 13, 2018, Delle Donne scored a season-high 36 points in a 95–91 victory over the Connecticut Sun. After scoring 23 points in a 77–80 loss to the Atlanta Dream, Delle Donne became the fastest player in WNBA history to score 3,000 points, completing the feat in 148 games. The previous record was held by Diana Taurasi and Seimone Augustus, who both completed the feat in 151 games. Delle Donne was voted into the 2018 WNBA All-Star Game, receiving her fifth all-star appearance. By the end of regular season, Delle Donne averaged 20.7 points per game. The Mystics were the number three seed with a 22–12 record, receiving a bye to the second round elimination game. The Mystics defeated the Los Angeles Sparks, 96–64, advancing to the semi-finals for the second year in a row. Delle Donne scored 19 points in the victory. In the semi-finals, the Mystics faced the number 2 seed Atlanta Dream, Delle Donne scored 32 points in Game one, lifting the Mystics to an 87–84 victory. The Mystics ended up winning the series in a hard-fought five-game series, advancing to the WNBA Finals for the first time in franchise history. However, the Mystics were swept by the Storm in the Finals.

During the 2019 season, Delle Donne was voted into the WNBA all-star game, making it her 6th all-star appearance and was also named Team Captain after receiving the top two votes among all-stars in the league for the new all-star game voting format. On July 30, 2019, Delle Donne scored a season-high 33 points in a 99–93 victory over the Phoenix Mercury. By the end of the season and with the help of Meesseman's return, the Mystics finished as the number 1 seed in the league with a 26–8 record, receiving a double-bye to the semi-finals. During the playoffs it was announced that Delle Donne had won the MVP award, making it her second career MVP award. She also made the All-WNBA First Team and finished the regular season with a new career-high in field goal percentage. In the semi-finals, the Mystics defeated the Las Vegas Aces 3–1 to advance to the WNBA Finals for the second year in a row, also making it Delle Donne's third finals appearance. During the finals, Delle Donne battled through injury, with a 1–0 Mystics' series lead, she left Game 2 with back spasms in which the Mystics lost, tying the series 1–1. However, she continued to play through injury for the rest of the series and help the Mystics win the WNBA championship after defeating the Connecticut Sun in five games, earning Delle Donne her first WNBA championship. Delle Donne also became the first woman to join the prestigious 50–40–90 club (50% field goals, 40% 3-point shooting and 90% free throws over a single season), marking great all-around shooters. Only nine men had previously achieved the feat in an NBA season: Larry Bird (twice consecutively), Steve Nash (four times in five seasons), Stephen Curry, Kevin Durant, Reggie Miller, Dirk Nowitzki, Mark Price, Malcolm Brogdon and Kyrie Irving.

In 2020, Delle Donne opted to sit out the entire season due to health concerns and preexisting risk factors with the COVID-19 pandemic. She had been denied medical opt out by the league despite recommendation by her physician to not play in the bubble to avoid any risk of exposure to the virus; however, the Mystics were able to resolve the issue and decided to pay Delle Donne her full salary for the season while being absent. Without Delle Donne and less of her supporting cast, the Mystics struggled to defend their title as they barely made the playoffs as the number 8 seed with a 9–13 record in the shortened 22-game season; they lost 85–84 to the Phoenix Mercury in the first round elimination game. Delle Donne was limited to three games during the 2021 WNBA season. During that season, she was named to The W25 as one of the top 25 players of the league's first 25 years.

In February 2024, Delle Donne announced that she would step away from basketball and did not sign the contract the Mystics had offered her.

On April 4, 2025, Delle Donne announced her retirement from professional basketball via her Instagram.

== Overseas career ==
Unlike the vast majority of WNBA players, Delle Donne has not played much professionally overseas, choosing instead to spend the traditional basketball season in the United States to help care for her sister, Lizzie. Her first experience in an overseas league did not come until 2017, when she signed a short-term deal to play for the Chinese team Shanxi in that league's playoffs. Her China sojourn ended prematurely when a flare-up of Lyme disease forced her to return to the US.

== National team career ==
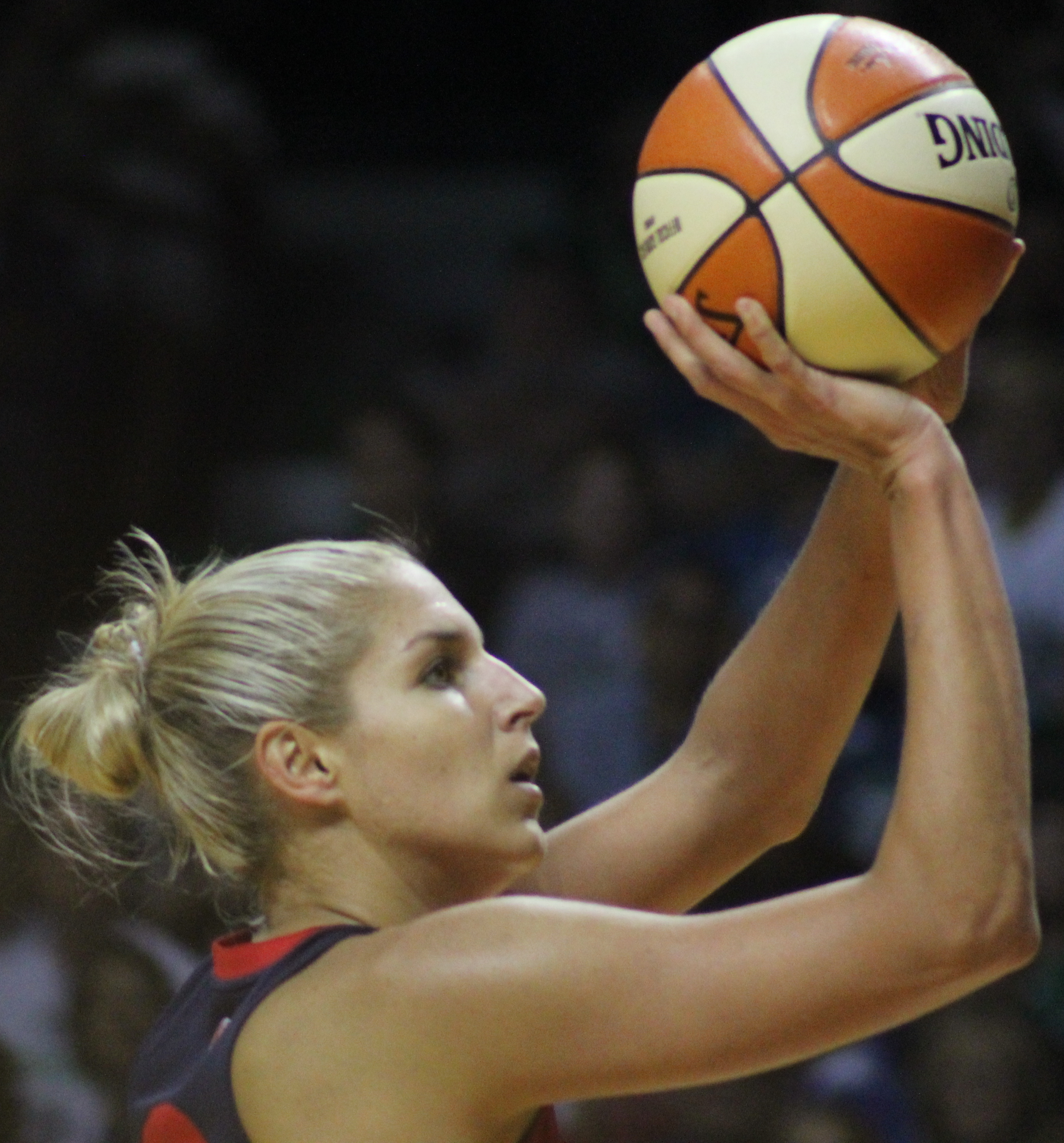
Delle Donne shooting a free throw in 2017

During her college days, Delle Donne was selected to the 2011 USA Basketball Team for the World University Games played August 12–23 in Shenzhen, China. Delle Donne led the team to a gold medal with a perfect 6–0 record and averaged 15.7 points, 8.5 rebounds and 3.0 assists. In the Championship game won by the USA 101–66 over Taiwan, Delle Donne scored 18 points on 8–14 shooting and led the team with 11 rebounds and 8 assists.

While Delle Donne was considered for the U.S. team at the 2014 World Championship, she was cut due to the back injury suffered in the WNBA Playoffs.

On April 27, 2016, Delle Donne was named to the 2016 United States team that competed at the 2016 Summer Olympics in Rio de Janeiro, Brazil. During the U.S. team's eighth gold medal campaign, she was a role player, starting off the bench in seven games and sitting out the game against China due to an eye injury received during practice. The U.S. team won the gold medal as they defeated Spain 101–72. Delle Donne is the sixth gold medalist hailing from Delaware.

== Personal life ==
Delle Donne was born in Wilmington, Delaware. Her parents are Ernie, a real estate developer, and Joanie. Her older brother, Gene, played college football as a tight end, first at Duke, then at Middle Tennessee. After he graduated from Middle Tennessee in 2009, he returned to Delaware to work for their father's company. Her older sister, Elizabeth (Lizzie), is blind, deaf, autistic and has cerebral palsy. Delle Donne normally cares for Lizzie during the WNBA offseason.

In 2008, during her senior year in high school, Delle Donne was diagnosed with Lyme disease after being bitten by an infected tick on the property of her family's home in Delaware. Delle Donne has stated that she takes "around 50 supplements a day" and maintains healthy eating to combat the disease. As a result of her condition, she opted not to play in the 2020 WNBA season to limit her exposure to the coronavirus. Delle Donne also struggled with back pain as early as 2014, and after the 2019 WNBA finals teammate Natasha Cloud revealed Delle Donne had been playing with three herniated discs, operated on in January 2020. During recovery, she felt leg pain that made her go through a second surgery, during which Delle Donne discovered to have spinal stenosis.

In February 2014, Delle Donne was named a Special Olympics Global Ambassador. She also played in the third annual NBA Cares Special Olympics Unified Basketball Game during All-Star weekend, alongside Special Olympics athletes, NBA legends and current WNBA and NBA players. Delle Donne plans to create The Elena Delle Donne Charitable Foundation, which will combine initiatives for both the Special Olympics and Lyme disease awareness.

In 2016, Delle Donne posed nude for ESPN’s The Body Issue magazine and was one of the athletes featured on a cover. Delle Donne appeared in the issue because she wanted to help people who feel insecure about their bodies like she did when she was growing up:

It’s such an empowering issue because it shows the different shapes and sizes of all kinds of athletes — this isn’t a supermodel issue, you know? It’s not about being the perfect size, perfect shape, or having the perfect face or hair. It’s about the work, the time, and energy that we put into our bodies, and how empowering that can be to an everyday person. They’re like, “Hey, that athlete, she’s really tall. That one is a little thicker.”

Delle Donne announced her engagement to her longtime girlfriend Amanda Clifton in an August 2016 issue of Vogue. On November 3, 2017, Delle Donne and Clifton married.

== Endorsement deals ==
Since being drafted in the WNBA, Delle Donne has signed multiple endorsement deals with different companies. In 2013, Delle Donne signed endorsement deals with Nike and DuPont, a chemical company which is based in her hometown Wilmington, Delaware. In 2015, Delle Donne signed a representation agreement with Octagon.

She is also one of three WNBA players to have career mode icons in NBA Live 19 alongside Candace Parker and Brittney Griner.

== Career statistics ==
Legend
GP	Games played	GS	Games started	MPG	Minutes per game	FG%	Field goal percentage	3P%	3-point field goal percentage
FT%	Free throw percentage	RPG	Rebounds per game	APG	Assists per game	SPG	Steals per game	BPG	Blocks per game
TO	Turnovers per game	PPG	Points per game	**Bold**	Career high	*	Led Division I

=== College ===
Year	Team	GP	GS	MPG	FG%	3P%	FT%	RPG	APG	SPG	BPG	TO	PPG
2009–10	Delaware	29	28	**37.5**	.479	.413	.898	8.8	1.9	**1.3**	2.0	2.4	26.7
2010–11	Delaware	22	21	35.6	.419	.350	**.944**	7.8	1.8	0.9	**2.6**	2.5	25.3
2011–12	Delaware	**33**	**32**	33.8	**.520**	.413	.889	**10.3**	**2.2**	1.1	2.6	1.7	***28.1**
2012–13	Delaware	30	30	33.0	.487	**.452**	.921	8.5	1.8	0.9	2.3	**1.1**	26.0
Career	4 years, 1 team	114	111	34.9	.481	.409	.910	8.9	1.9	1.0	2.3	1.8	26.7

=== WNBA Regular Season ===
†	Denotes seasons in which Delle Donne won a WNBA championship

‡	WNBA record

Year	Team	GP	GS	MPG	FG%	3P%	FT%	RPG	APG	SPG	BPG	TO	PPG
2013	Chicago	30	30	31.4	.426	.438	.929°	5.6	1.8	0.7	1.8	1.3	18.1
2014	Chicago	16	9	25.4	.429	.364	.933	4.0	1.1	0.6	1.4	0.8	17.9
2015	Chicago	**31**	**31**	**33.3**	.460	.313	.950°	**8.4**	1.4	1.1	**2.0**	1.2	**23.4**°
2016	Chicago	28	28	33.1	.485	.426	.935	7.0	0.8	**1.4**	1.5	1.3	21.5
2017	Washington	25	25	30.3	.494	.388	.953	6.8	1.6	0.8	1.4	1.5	19.7
2018	Washington	29	29	32.2	.488	.405	.887	7.2	**2.3**	0.9	1.3	0.9	20.7
2019^{†}	Washington	**31**	**31**	29.1	**.515**	.430	.974°	8.3	2.2	0.5	1.2	1.0	19.5
2021	Washington	3	3	17.3	.481	**.600**	**1.000**	4.3	0.7	0.0	0.3	0.7	13.7
2022	Washington	25	25	27.8	.480	.368	.913	6.3	**2.3**	0.5	1.1	1.1	17.2
2023	Washington	23	23	27.5	.485	.393	.938°	5.4	2.1	0.8	0.9	1.3	16.7
Career	10 years, 2 teams	241	234	30.2	.475	.392	.937‡	6.7	1.9	0.7	1.4	1.1	19.5

=== WNBA Playoffs ===
Year	Team	GP	GS	MPG	FG%	3P%	FT%	RPG	APG	SPG	BPG	TO	PPG
2013	Chicago	2	2	32.0	.381	.000	**1.000**	3.5	2.0	0.5	**2.0**	1.0	15.0
2014	Chicago	**9**	**9**	31.0	.482	.379	.919	3.3	1.6	0.3	1.5	0.8	16.8
2015	Chicago	3	3	36.3	.500	.438	**1.000**	6.3	2.0	0.7	1.0	2.0	**21.7**
2017	Washington	5	5	34.8	.449	**.444**	.957	8.0	2.0	0.0	0.8	1.6	20.0
2018	Washington	8	8	34.5	.453	.346	**1.000**	**9.5**	2.9	0.6	0.8	1.8	19.6
2019^{†}	Washington	**9**	**9**	30.2	.504	.394	.885	6.6	2.0	**0.8**	1.5	0.8	16.9
2022	Washington	2	2	33.0	**.516**	.111	**1.000**	2.5	**5.0**	0.5	1.0	1.5	19.0
2023	Washington	2	2	**36.5**	.321	.000	**1.000**	4.5	3.5	0.5	1.0	**0.0**	11.0
Career	7 years, 2 teams	40	40	32.8	.467	.348	.954‡	6.1	2.3	0.5	1.3	1.2	17.9

== Awards and honors ==
=== Basketball ===
- 2004 – USA Today Freshman All-America, Nike All-America Camp, Street & Smith Preseason All-America Honorable Mention, All-State First Team
- 2005 – Scut/FCP SUPER SIX, Parade All-America Fourth Team, EA Sports All-America, Gatorade Delaware Player of the Year, DSBA Delaware Player of the Year, Street & Smith All-American Third Team, All-State First Team 2005
- 2006 – Slam Magazine All-American First Team, Women's Basketball Magazine All-American First Team, Parade All-American First Team, Sports Illustrated All-American Second Team, EA Sports All-American, USA Today All-American Third Team, Gatorade State Player of the Year, All-State First Team 2006
- 2007 – Parade All-American Third Team, Gatorade State Player of the Year, First-ever cover subject of GIRL magazine
- 2008 – McDonald's All-American Team, USA Today National Player of the Year and First Team All-America, Naismith Prep Player of the Year, Gatorade National Player of the Year, EA Sports Player of the Year, Delaware Athlete of the Year
- 2010 – AP All-American Honorable Mention, CAA Player of the Year, CAA All-Defensive Team, CAA All-Rookie Team, CAA All-Tournament Team, Delaware Athlete of the Year
- 2011 – AP and WBCA All-American Third Team, All-CAA First Team, CAA All-Tournament Team
- 2012 – AP, WBCA, Wooden, and USBWA All-American First Team, CAA Player of the Year, CAA Tournament Most Outstanding Player, Delaware Athlete of the Year
- 2013 – AP, WBCA, Wooden, and USBWA All-American First Team, CAA Player of the Year, CAA All-Defensive Team, CAA Tournament Most Outstanding Player, UD Outstanding Female Senior Athlete, WNBA Rookie of the Year, All-WNBA Second Team
- 2013 – Winner of the Honda Sports Award for basketball
- 2015 – WNBA Most Valuable Player, All-WNBA First Team, scoring champion
- 2016 – Nominee for ESPYS Best Female Athlete award
- 2019 – WNBA Most Valuable Player
- 2021 – The W25 (top 25 WNBA players of the league's first 25 years)
- 2026 – Naismith Basketball Hall of Fame (to be inducted in August)
- 2026 – Washington DC Sports Hall of Fame

=== Student-athlete awards ===
- 2010 – CAA All-Academic First Team
- 2011 – CAA All-Academic First Team
- 2012 – Academic All-America Team, CAA Scholar-Athlete of the Year, CAA All-Academic First Team
- 2013 – Academic All-America Team, Senior CLASS Award, CAA Scholar-Athlete of the Year, CAA All-Academic First Team
- 2014 – NCAA Today's Top 10 Award

=== President's Council on Sports, Fitness, and Nutrition ===
On March 23, 2022, Delle Donne was named by President Joe Biden as co-chair of the President's Council on Sports, Fitness, and Nutrition. She served a two-year term through 2024. The other co-chair named was José Andrés, a chef and founder of World Central Kitchen.

=== Other ===
For their first match of March 2019, the women of the United States women's national soccer team each wore a jersey with the name of a woman they were honoring on the back; Emily Fox chose the name of Delle Donne.

== See also ==
- List of NCAA Division I women's basketball career scoring leaders
- List of NCAA Division I women's basketball players with 2,500 points and 1,000 rebounds
- List of WNBA career blocks leaders
