= Sharnee Zoll-Norman =

American basketball player (born 1986)

Sharnee Zoll
Personal information
- Born: July 11, 1986 (age 40) Philadelphia, Pennsylvania, U.S.
- Listed height: 5 ft 7 in (1.70 m)
- Listed weight: 148 lb (67 kg)

Career information
- High school: Highland (Blackwood, New Jersey)
- College: Virginia (2004–2008)
- WNBA draft: 2008: 3rd round, 29th overall pick
- Drafted by: Los Angeles Sparks
- Position: Guard

Career history
- 2008: Minnesota Lynx
- 2013: Chicago Sky
- Stats at WNBA.com
- Stats at Basketball Reference
Medals
Women's basketball
Representing the United States
FIBA Under-19 World Cup
Gold medal – first place	2005 Tunisia	Team

Sharnee Zoll-Norman (born July 11, 1986) is an American former professional basketball player. Zoll-Norman played throughout Europe and most recently with the Chicago Sky of the WNBA.

On April 11, 2024, Zoll-Norman was named an assistant coach at Virginia Tech.

== Personal ==
Zoll was born in Philadelphia, Pennsylvania to Cheryl and Tony Zoll. She is the only child of Cheryl and shares her father with brothers Chris and Dustin Myers. Cheryl is a retired veteran of the Armed Forces. She lived on McGuire Air Force Base for the majority of her life and also resided in Sembach, Germany while her mother was stationed there. Zoll moved to Marlboro Township, New Jersey before her freshman year to attend Marlboro High School, a school her mother chose for the quality of both its academics and basketball. She attended Marlboro for her first three high school years before transferring to Highland Regional High School in the Blackwood section of Gloucester Township, New Jersey for her senior year. Although she has mentioned her wife Serita Norman in previous interviews, she never formally came out until a June 2013 interview with the Windy City Times, stating "If I was straight, I wouldn't have to come out and say that I was straight. So I've never had an official coming-out, or something where I felt I had to announce that I was gay. But everyone knows. I wear my wedding ring proudly; I have matching tattoos with my wife, and also have her name tattooed on me. We go a lot of places [together] and I surely don't hide it [that she's my wife]."

== College career ==
Zoll played at the University of Virginia from 2004 to 2008, where she was a 1000-point scorer and two-time All-ACC third team honoree. She is most widely known for holding the Atlantic Coast Conference assist record with 785 assists; previously held by Dawn Staley, also a UVA alum. Sharnee is the only woman in ACC history to post three seasons of at least 200 assists and did so in succession from 2006 to 2008. In the summer of 2005, Zoll was named to the gold medal-winning USA U19 World Championship Team.

== Virginia statistics ==
Legend
GP	Games played	GS	Games started	MPG	Minutes per game
FG%	Field goal percentage	3P%	3-point field goal percentage	FT%	Free throw percentage
RPG	Rebounds per game	APG	Assists per game	SPG	Steals per game
BPG	Blocks per game	PPG	Points per game	**Bold**	Career high

Year	Team	GP	Points	FG%	3P%	FT%	RPG	APG	SPG	BPG	PPG
2004-05	Virginia	32	191	34.5	16.1	58.7	3.2	5.0	1.6	-	6.0
2005-06	Virginia	32	**357**	39.0	**38.0**	75.2	3.0	6.3	**2.3**	**0.2**	**11.2**
2006-07	Virginia	**34**	331	36.3	33.1	75.5	2.8	6.1	1.5	0.1	9.7
2007-08	Virginia	**34**	290	**39.2**	32.0	**80.6**	**3.2**	**6.4**	1.8	0.1	8.5
Career	Virginia	132	1169	37.4	31.5	72.9	3.1	5.9	1.8	0.1	8.9

== USA Basketball ==
Zoll joined the USA Women's U18 team as it became the U19 team, and competed in the 2005 U19 World Championships in Tunis, Tunisia. The USA team won all eight games, winning the gold medal. Zoll averaged 2.9 points per game.

== Professional career ==
Sharnee was drafted 29th overall in the 2008 WNBA draft to the Los Angeles Sparks. After being waived by the Sparks, she spent a short time with the Minnesota Lynx before continuing her playing career overseas. In the 2008–2009 season, she signed with a Romanian club named Sepsi B.C.. Zoll led the Romanian league and EuroCup in assists. In the following season, Zoll signed with Botas Spor in Adana, Turkey. Again she led the Turkish league and EuroCup in assists. Till 2013 Zoll was playing with CCC Polkowice in Poland. She led the league in assists and assist-to-turnover ratio while leading CCC to its highest ever finish in the PLKK playoffs (2nd place). In 2011–12, Zoll's CCC Polkowice team participated in EuroLeague Women. She led the competition in assists per game at 6.6 while playing alongside current Spark Jantel Lavender. In 2012–13, Zoll's CCC Polkowice team won PLKK Champions title and Polish Cup as well. In the 2013–2014 season, she signed with a Polish club named KSSSE AZS PWSZ Gorzów Wielkopolski.

Zoll-Norman was hired as an assistant coach for the University of Rhode Island women's basketball team in 2019. She is now an Assistant Coach for Penn State University Women's Basketball.

== WNBA career statistics ==
Legend
GP	Games played	GS	Games started	MPG	Minutes per game	RPG	Rebounds per game
APG	Assists per game	SPG	Steals per game	BPG	Blocks per game	PPG	Points per game
TO	Turnovers per game	FG%	Field-goal percentage	3P%	3-point field-goal percentage	FT%	Free-throw percentage
**Bold**	Career best	°	League leader

=== Regular season ===
Year	Team	GP	GS	MPG	FG%	3P%	FT%	RPG	APG	SPG	BPG	TO	PPG
2008	Minnesota	6	0	5.0	**.250**	**.333**	**.833**	0.5	0.5	**0.2**	0.0	0.5	**1.7**
2013	Chicago	**19**	0	**9.7**	.214	.000	.625	**0.7**	**1.7**	**0.2**	0.0	0.8	0.9
Career	2 years, 2 teams	25	0	8.6	.222	.111	.714	0.7	1.4	0.2	0.0	0.8	1.1
