= Melisa Can =

Turkish-American basketball player

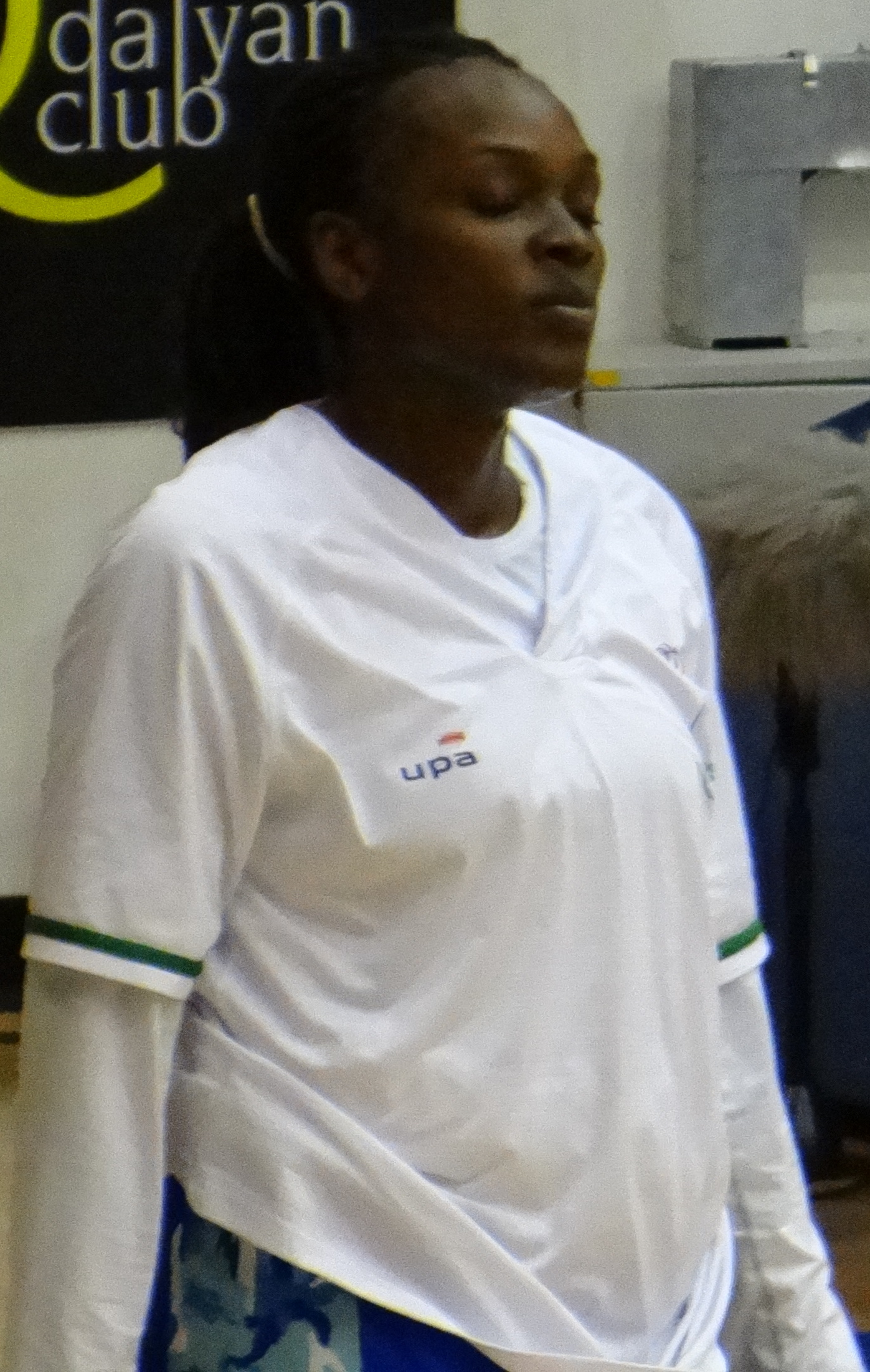

No. 34 – Adana ASKI
- Position: Power forward
- League: Turkish Women's Basketball League

Personal information
- Born: May 12, 1984 (age 42) Iowa, United States
- Listed height: 6 ft 2 in (1.88 m)

Career information
- College: Rutgers University

Career history
- Turkey 2017-2019: Girne
- Turkey 2014-2016: Adana ASKİ
- Turkey 2013-2014: İstanbul Üniversitesi B.G.D.
- WNBA 2013: Chicago Sky
- Turkey 2012-2013: Tarsus Belediye
- Turkey 2010-2012: Galatasaray Medical Park
- Turkey 2007-2010: Ceyhan Belediye
- Latvia 2007-2008: SK Cēsis
- Poland 2007: Energa Toruń
- Israel 2006-2007: Raanana Herzeliya
- Korea 2006: Shinsegae Coolcats
- Big East 2002-2006: Rutgers University
- Lawrence Township, NJ: Notre Dame High School

Career highlights
- Turkish Cup MVP (2015); Turkish Cup Champion (2011); Big East Most Improved Player (2005)
- Stats at Basketball Reference

Melisa Can (born Michelle Marie Campbell, May 12, 1984) is retired female basketball player who played power forward.

Can grew up in Princeton, New Jersey and graduated from Notre Dame High School. She joined Rutgers in the 2002–03 season. She acquired Turkish citizenship in 2010 and consequently adopted the Turkish name of Melisa Can.

== Career statistics ==
Legend
GP	Games played	GS	Games started	MPG	Minutes per game	RPG	Rebounds per game
APG	Assists per game	SPG	Steals per game	BPG	Blocks per game	PPG	Points per game
TO	Turnovers per game	FG%	Field-goal percentage	3P%	3-point field-goal percentage	FT%	Free-throw percentage
**Bold**	Career best	°	League leader

=== WNBA ===
==== Regular season ====
Year	Team	GP	GS	MPG	FG%	3P%	FT%	RPG	APG	SPG	BPG	TO	PPG
2013	Chicago	31	0	7.7	31.4	0.0	73.3	1.5	0.2	0.2	0.2	0.5	1.7
Career	1 year, 1 team	31	0	7.7	31.4	0.0	73.3	1.5	0.2	0.2	0.2	0.5	1.7

==== Playoffs ====
Year	Team	GP	GS	MPG	FG%	3P%	FT%	RPG	APG	SPG	BPG	TO	PPG
2013	Chicago	1	0	1.0	0.0	0.0	0.0	0.0	0.0	0.0	0.0	0.0	0.0
Career	1 year, 1 team	1	0	1.0	0.0	0.0	0.0	0.0	0.0	0.0	0.0	0.0	0.0

=== College ===
Legend
GP	Games played	GS	Games started	MPG	Minutes per game
FG%	Field goal percentage	3P%	3-point field goal percentage	FT%	Free throw percentage
RPG	Rebounds per game	APG	Assists per game	SPG	Steals per game
BPG	Blocks per game	PPG	Points per game	**Bold**	Career high

Year	Team	GP	Points	FG%	3P%	FT%	RPG	APG	SPG	BPG	PPG
2002-03	Rutgers	29	163	53.8%	0.0%	**75.4%**	2.6	0.2	0.7	0.2	5.6
2003-04	Rutgers	33	246	53.6%	0.0%	61.9%	4.7	0.3	0.8	0.5	7.5
2004-05	Rutgers	**35**	**385**	**56.1%**	0.0%	70.3%	**5.7**	0.8	**1.0**	0.5	**11.0**
2005-06	Rutgers	32	260	55.0%	0.0%	72.9%	5.2	0.8	0.7	0.5	8.1
Career		129	1054	54.9%	0.0%	69.9%	4.6	0.6	0.8	0.4	8.2

== See also ==
- Turkish women in sports
