= 50–40–90 club =

Rare shooting proficiency in basketball

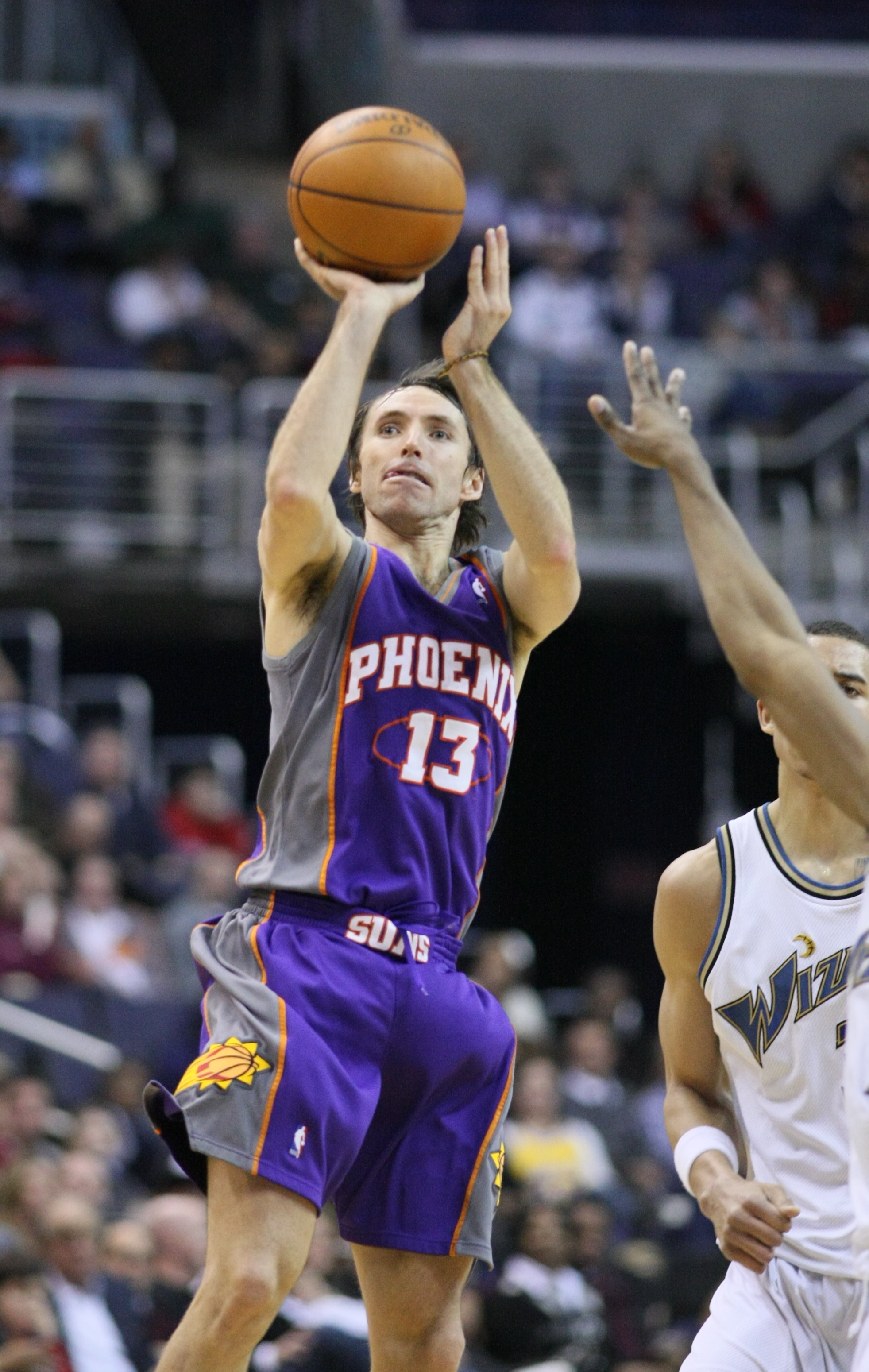
During his second stint with the Phoenix Suns, Steve Nash achieved the 50-40-90 feat in four separate seasons, the most of any player.

The 50–40–90 club is a statistical achievement used to distinguish players as excellent shooters in the National Basketball Association (NBA), NBA G League, Women's National Basketball Association (WNBA), and college basketball. It requires a player to achieve the criteria of 50% field goal percentage, 40% three-point field goal percentage, and 90% free throw percentage over the course of a regular season, while meeting the minimum thresholds to qualify as a league leader in each category.

In NBA, WNBA, and NBA G League history, only 12 players have recorded a 50–40–90 season, with nine in the NBA, two in the WNBA, and one in the NBA G League. The most recent player to achieve a 50–40–90 season was Napheesa Collier in 2025. Thirteen collegiate players have recorded a 50–40–90 season, with Salim Stoudamire and Matt Kennedy recording 50–50–90 seasons.

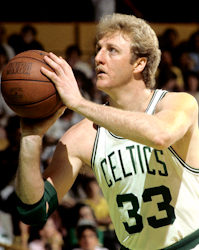
Larry Bird, the first player to accomplish the 50–40–90 achievement, and one of three players to achieve the feat in multiple seasons.

== History ==
The 50–40–90 season has only been a possibility since the introduction of the three-point field goal in the 1979–80 NBA season.

Steve Nash, Larry Bird, and Kevin Durant are the only players who have had multiple 50–40–90 seasons. Bird recorded consecutive 50–40–90 seasons in 1986–87 and 1987–88, while Nash recorded four such seasons between 2005 and 2010. Nash narrowly missed five consecutive 50–40–90 seasons by shooting at 89.9% from the free throw line during the 2006–07 season, one made free throw short of the 90% mark. Durant's two 50–40–90 seasons are notably separated by 10 years, having been recorded in 2012–13 and 2022–23.

Stephen Curry is the only player to record a 50–40–90 season while averaging over 30 PPG. He is also the only player in NBA history to join the club and lead the league in scoring in the same season. Curry recorded 30.1 PPG on 50–45–91 splits in the 2015–16 season.

Elena Delle Donne became the first WNBA player to record a 50–40–90 season in 2019.

Kevin Durant (2012–13) and Mark Price (1988–89), at the age of 24, are the youngest players to join the 50–40–90 club.

Quinn Cook became the first NBA G League player to record a 50–40–90 season in 2018.

== List and calculations ==
=== NBA ===
Similar to baseball batting averages, official NBA shooting statistics are calculated to the third decimal place (thousandths) but are referred to as percentages. While the NBA officially uses a three-digit number, it reports shooting statistics in a shortened and rounded form as a percentage, so that .899 to the third decimal place is simplified as a two digit "90%" in most of its reporting. Thus, a true 50–40–90 season requires a player to achieve or exceed 50.0 percent field goal efficiency, 40.0 percent three-point field goal efficiency and 90.0 percent free-throw shooting efficiency. The NBA requires a player to make at least 300 field goals, 82 three-pointers, and 125 free throws to be a leader in the respective category. For shortened seasons, stats are prorated to an 82-game season. Dirk Nowitzki qualifies for the club despite having fewer than 82 three-pointers because the NBA only required 55 three-point field goals made at the time of his attainment in 2007.

^	Active NBA or WNBA player
*	Inducted into the Naismith Memorial Basketball Hall of Fame
†	Not yet eligible for Hall of Fame consideration (Note: A player is not eligible for induction into the Naismith Memorial Basketball Hall of Fame until he/she has been fully retired for two calendar years.)

Player	Team	Season	GP	FG	FGA	FG%	3P	3PA	3P%	FT	FTA	FT%	PTS	PPG	Ref.
Larry Bird*	Boston Celtics	1986–87	74	786	1,497	53% (.525)	90	225	40% (.400)	414	455	91% (.910)	2,076	28.1	
Larry Bird* (2)	Boston Celtics (2)	1987–88	76	881	1,672	53% (.527)	98	237	41% (.414)	415	453	92% (.916)	2,275	29.9	
Mark Price	Cleveland Cavaliers	1988–89	75	529	1,006	53% (.526)	93	211	44% (.441)	263	292	90% (.901)	1,414	18.9	
Reggie Miller*	Indiana Pacers	1993–94	79	524	1,042	50% (.503)	123	292	42% (.421)	403	444	91% (.908)	1,574	19.9	
Steve Nash*	Phoenix Suns	2005–06	79	541	1,056	51% (.512)	150	342	44% (.439)	257	279	92% (.921)	1,489	18.8	
Dirk Nowitzki*	Dallas Mavericks	2006–07	78	673	1,341	50% (.502)	72	173	42% (.416)	498	551	90% (.904)	1,916	24.6	
Steve Nash* (2)	Phoenix Suns (2)	2007–08	81	485	962	50% (.504)	179	381	47% (.470)	222	245	91% (.906)	1,371	16.9	
Steve Nash* (3)	Phoenix Suns (3)	2008–09	74	428	851	50% (.503)	108	246	44% (.439)	196	210	93% (.933)	1,160	15.7	
Steve Nash* (4)	Phoenix Suns (4)	2009–10	81	499	985	51% (.507)	124	291	43% (.426)	211	225	94% (.938)	1,333	16.5	
Kevin Durant^	Oklahoma City Thunder	2012–13	81	731	1,433	51% (.510)	139	334	42% (.416)	679	750	91% (.905)	2,280	28.1	
Stephen Curry^	Golden State Warriors	2015–16	79	805	1,598	50% (.504)	402	886	45% (.454)	363	400	91% (.908)	2,375	30.1	
Malcolm Brogdon^{†}	Milwaukee Bucks	2018–19	64	378	748	51% (.505)	104	244	43% (.426)	141	152	93% (.928)	1,001	15.6	
Kyrie Irving^	Brooklyn Nets	2020–21	54	549	1,086	51% (.506)	152	378	40% (.402)	201	218	92% (.922)	1,451	26.9	
Kevin Durant^ (2)	Brooklyn Nets (2) / Phoenix Suns (5) (Note: Durant was traded from the Nets to the Suns during the season. He played 39 games for the Nets and 8 games for the Suns.)	2022–23	47	483	862	56% (.560)	93	230	40% (.404)	307	334	92% (.919)	1,366	29.1	

=== WNBA ===
Player	Season	GP	FG	FGA	FG%	3P	3PA	3P%	FT	FTA	FT%	PTS	PPG	Ref.
Elena Delle Donne*	2019	31	220	427	52% (.515)	52	121	43% (.430)	114	117	97% (.974)	606	19.5	
Napheesa Collier^	2025	33	275	518	53% (.531)	50	124	40% (.403)	155	171	91% (.906)	755	22.8	

=== NBA G League ===
Player	Season	GP	FG	FGA	FG%	3P	3PA	3P%	FT	FTA	FT%	PTS	PPG	Ref.
Quinn Cook	2017–18	29	269	513	52% (.524)	83	190	44% (.437)	114	120	95% (.950)	735	25.3	

=== Men's NCAA ===
Player	Team	Season	GP	FG	FGA	FG%	3P	3PA	3P%	FT	FTA	FT%	PTS	PPG	Ref.
Josh Grant	Utah	1992–93	31	194	366	53% (.530)	44	100	44% (.440)	104	113	92% (.920)	536	17.3	
Salim Stoudamire	Arizona	2004–05	36	210	417	50% (.504)	120	238	50% (.504)	122	134	91% (.910)	662	18.4	
Jaycee Carroll	Utah State	2007–08	34	251	502	50% (.500)	42	101	42% (.416)	137	149	92% (.919)	785	22.4	
Luke Babbitt	Nevada	2009–10	36	194	366	53% (.530)	44	100	44% (.440)	199	217	92% (.917)	743	21.9	
Levi Knutson	Colorado	2010–11	38	158	312	51% (.506)	81	171	47% (.474)	47	52	90% (.904)	444	11.7	
Isaiah Williams	Iona	2013–14	28	118	221	53% (.534)	61	143	43% (.427)	18	20	90% (.900)	315	12.8	
Matt Kennedy	Charleston Southern	2013–14	31	135	264	51% (.511)	49	98	50% (.500)	69	76	91% (.908)	388	12.5	
Miles Bowman	High Point	2016–17	30	140	274	51% (.511)	34	69	49% (.493)	109	121	90% (.901)	423	14.1	
Cassius Winston	Michigan State	2017–18	35	143	282	51% (.507)	73	169	49% (.497)	81	90	90% (.900)	442	12.6	
David Cohn	William & Mary	2017–18	31	144	272	53% (.529)	49	115	43% (.426)	103	113	91% (.912)	440	14.2	
Trey Murphy III	Virginia	2020–21	25	96	191	50% (.503)	52	120	43% (.433)	38	41	93% (.927)	282	11.3	

=== Women's NCAA ===
Player	Team	Season	GP	FG	FGA	FG%	3P	3PA	3P%	FT	FTA	FT%	PTS	PPG	Ref
Kristin Iwanaga	California	2004–05	29	86	172	50% (.500)	43	82	52% (.524)	85	91	93% (.934)	300	10.3	
Jen Dumiak	American	2014–15	33	199	382	52% (.521)	23	56	41% (.411)	142	154	92% (.922)	563	17.1	
Marta Gomez	Wyoming	2018–19	34	184	352	52% (.523)	73	154	47% (.474)	89	96	93% (.927)	530	15.6	
Eva Hodgson	William & Mary	2019–20	29	183	339	54% (.540)	57	132	43% (.432)	176	193	91% (.912)	599	20.7	
Shay Ciezki	Indiana	2025–26	20	244	454	54% (.537)	78	169	46% (.462)	108	119	91% (.908)	674	23.2	
Britt Prince	Nebraska	2025–26	29	188	346	54% (.543)	36	79	46% (.456)	91	101	90% (.901)	503	17.3	

== See also ==
- NBA records
