= D'Andra Moss =

American-born basketball player (born 1988)

No. 24 – Mersin Büyükşehir
- Position: Point guard
- League: TKBL

Personal information
- Born: February 21, 1988 (age 38) Atlanta, Georgia, U.S.
- Listed height: 5 ft 11 in (1.80 m)

Career information
- College: VCU (2006–2010)

Career highlights
- First-team All-CAA (2010)

D'Andra Yvette Moss (born February 21, 1988) is a basketball player who currently players for Mersin Büyükşehir. Born in the United States, she has played for the Ukrainian national team since September 2016.

She participated at the EuroBasket Women 2017.

== Virginia Commonwealth statistics ==
Legend
GP	Games played	GS	Games started	MPG	Minutes per game
FG%	Field goal percentage	3P%	3-point field goal percentage	FT%	Free throw percentage
RPG	Rebounds per game	APG	Assists per game	SPG	Steals per game
BPG	Blocks per game	PPG	Points per game	**Bold**	Career high

Year	Team	GP	Points	FG%	3P%	FT%	RPG	APG	SPG	BPG	PPG
2006–07	Virginia Commonwealth	26	167	41.3%	37.5%	77.0%	3.2	1.7	0.8	–	6.4
2007–08	Virginia Commonwealth	34	214	40.6%	31.0%	72.6%	6.0	1.3	1.2	0.1	6.3
2008–09	Virginia Commonwealth	22	217	44.7%	**37.9%**	**88.5%**	5.9	1.8	1.4	0.1	9.9
2009–10	Virginia Commonwealth	**35**	**618**	**43.2%**	35.7%	81.3%	**6.6**	**2.0**	**1.9**	**0.2**	**17.7**
Career		117	1216	42.7%	11.1%	80.0%	12.3	1.7	1.4	0.1	10.4
