= 2012 New York Liberty season =

- Coach: John Whisenant
- Arena: Prudential Center
- Attendance: per game

Results
- Record: 15–19 (.441)
- Place: 4th (Eastern)
- Playoff finish: Lost in Conference Semifinals

Media
- Television: MSG, MSG+ ESPN2, NBATV

The 2012 WNBA season was the 16th season for the New York Liberty of the Women's National Basketball Association. The Liberty played at Prudential Center in New Jersey from 2011 through 2013 during renovations at Madison Square Garden.

== Transactions ==
=== WNBA draft ===
The following are the Liberty's selections in the 2012 WNBA draft.

| Round | Pick | Player | Nationality | School/team/country |
|---|---|---|---|---|
| 1 | 7 | Kelley Cain | United States | Tennessee |
| 3 | 36 (from Minn.) | Katelan Redmon | United States | Gonzaga |

=== Transaction log ===
- April 11, 2011: The Liberty traded a second-round pick in the 2012 Draft to the Minnesota Lynx in exchange for Jessica Breland.
- May 27, 2011: The Liberty swapped third-round picks in the 2012 Draft with the Minnesota Lynx as part of the Quanitra Hollingsworth trade.
- February 14: The Liberty re-signed Leilani Mitchell.
- February 24: The Liberty signed Kelly Miller.
- March 5: The Liberty signed Rafaella Masciadri.
- April 13: The Liberty signed DeMya Walker and Essence Carson.
- April 23: The Liberty signed Laura Broomfield and Iasia Hemingway.
- April 27: The Liberty signed draft picks Kelley Cain and Katelan Redmon.
- May 11: The Liberty waived Iasia Hemingway.
- May 16: The Liberty waived Laura Broomfield and Sydney Colson.
- May 17: The Liberty waived Katelan Redmon and Raffaella Masciadri and suspended Quanitra Hollingsworth.
- July 2: The Liberty waived Kelly Miller.

=== Personnel changes ===
==== Additions ====
| Player | Signed | Former team |
| DeMya Walker | April 13, 2012 | Washington Mystics |
| Kelley Cain | April 16, 2012 | draft pick |

==== Subtractions ====
| Player | Left | New team |
| Ta'Shia Phillips | 2012 | free agent |
| Sydney Colson | May 16, 2012 | free agent |

== Roster ==
2012 New York Liberty roster
Players
Coaches

| Pos. | No. | Nat. | Name | Height | Weight | DOB | From | Yrs |
|---|---|---|---|---|---|---|---|---|
| F/C | 45 | (United States) | Braxton, Kara | 6' 6" (1.98m) | 225 lb (102kg) | 1983-02-18 | Georgia | 7 |
| C | 52 | (United States) | Cain, Kelley | 6' 6" (1.98m) | 220 lb (100kg) | 1989-05-16 | Tennessee | R |
| G/F | 17 | (United States) | Carson, Essence | 6' 0" (1.83m) | 165 lb (75kg) | 1986-07-28 | Rutgers | 4 |
| PG | 5 | (United States) | Mitchell, Leilani | 5' 5" (1.65m) | 128 lb (58kg) | 1985-06-15 | Utah | 4 |
| G/F | 21 | (United States) | Montgomery, Alex | 6' 1" (1.85m) | 185 lb (84kg) | 1988-11-12 | Georgia Tech | 1 |
| F/C | 33 | (United States) | Pierson, Plenette | 6' 2" (1.88m) | 180 lb (82kg) | 1981-08-31 | Texas Tech | 9 |
| G | 23 | (United States) | Pondexter, Cappie | 5' 9" (1.75m) | 160 lb (73kg) | 1983-01-07 | Rutgers | 6 |
| F | 14 | (United States) | Powell, Nicole | 6' 2" (1.88m) | 170 lb (77kg) | 1982-06-22 | Stanford | 8 |
| G/F | 30 | (United States) | Redmon, Katelan | 6' 1" (1.85m) | | 1988-10-11 | Gonzaga | R |
| C | 15 | (United States) | Vaughn, Kia | 6' 4" (1.93m) | 198 lb (90kg) | 1987-01-24 | Rutgers | 3 |
| F | 22 | (United States) | Walker, DeMya | 6' 3" (1.91m) | 200 lb (91kg) | 1977-11-28 | Virginia | 12 |

Head coach
(United States) John Whisenant (New Mexico State)
Assistant coaches
(United States) Monique Ambers (Arizona State)
(United States) Norm Ellenberger (Butler)
Athletic trainer
(United States) Laura Ramus (Wayne State (MI))
Strength and conditioning coach
(United States) Kevin Duffy (Ohio)

Legend

- (C) Team captain
- (DP) Unsigned draft pick
- (FA) Free agent
- (S) Suspended
- Injured

=== Depth ===
| Pos. | Starter | Bench |
|---|---|---|
| C | Kia Vaughn | Kara Braxton; Kelley Cain |
| PF | Plenette Pierson | DeMya Walker |
| SF | Essence Carson | Nicole Powell |
| SG | Cappie Pondexter | Alex Montgomery |
| PG | Leilani Mitchell |

== Season standings ==
| Eastern Conference | W | L | PCT | GB | Home | Road | Conf. |
|---|---|---|---|---|---|---|---|
| Connecticut Sun ^{y} | 25 | 9 | .735 | – | 12–5 | 13–4 | 18–4 |
| Indiana Fever ^{x} | 22 | 12 | .647 | 3.0 | 13–4 | 9–8 | 15–7 |
| Atlanta Dream ^{x} | 19 | 15 | .559 | 6.0 | 11–6 | 8–9 | 12–10 |
| New York Liberty ^{x} | 15 | 19 | .441 | 10.0 | 9–8 | 6–11 | 10–12 |
| Chicago Sky ^{o} | 14 | 20 | .412 | 11.0 | 7–10 | 7–10 | 8–14 |
| Washington Mystics ^{o} | 5 | 29 | .147 | 20.0 | 4–13 | 1–16 | 3–19 |

== Schedule ==
=== Preseason ===
2012 Game Log: Preseason (May)

| Game | Date | Time (ET) | Opponent | TV | Score | High points | High rebounds | High assists | Location/Attendance | Record |
|---|---|---|---|---|---|---|---|---|---|---|
| 1 | Mon 7 | 7:00 | @ Connecticut | | 81-96 | Braxton (18) | Braxton (11) | Mitchell (5) | Mohegan Sun Arena; 4,287 | 0-1 |
| 2 | Mon 14 | 10:30am | Chicago | | 57-89 | Pierson (14) | Carson (6) | Mitchell (4) | Prudential Center; 6,397 | 0-2 |

=== Regular season ===
2012 Game Log: Regular Season
May (0–4)

| Game | Date | Time (ET) | Opponent | TV | Score | High points | High rebounds | High assists | Location/Attendance | Record |
|---|---|---|---|---|---|---|---|---|---|---|
| 1 | Sat 19 | 4:00 | Connecticut | MSG+ | 73-78 | Pondexter (19) | Pierson (10) | Mitchell (3) | Madison Square Garden; 8,112 | 0-1 |
| 2 | Sun 20 | 5:00 | @ Connecticut | CPTV-S | 77-92 | Pondexter (18) | Pierson (5) | Mitchell; Pondexter (4) | Mohegan Sun Arena; 7,118 | 0-2 |
| 3 | Tue 22 | 7:00 | Minnesota | | 62-80 | Pondexter (15) | Vaughn (11) | Mitchell (2) | Prudential Center; 5,411 | 0-3 |
| 4 | Fri 25 | 7:30 | @ Atlanta | SSO | 74-100 | Pondexter (18) | Pierson (10) | Mitchell; Pondexter (5) | Philips Arena; 6,802 | 0-4 |

June (5–5)

| Game | Date | Time (ET) | Opponent | TV | Score | High points | High rebounds | High assists | Location/Attendance | Record |
|---|---|---|---|---|---|---|---|---|---|---|
| 5 | Sat 2 | 7:00 | @ Indiana | FS-I | 68-91 | Pierson (24) | Powell (7) | Pondexter; Walker (4) | Bankers Life Fieldhouse; 8,006 | 0-5 |
| 6 | Sun 3 | 6:00 | Indiana | MSG | 87-72 | Pondexter (25) | Vaughn (8) | Carson; Pierson (4) | Prudential Center; 4,905 | 1-5 |
| 7 | Tue 5 | 7:00 | Atlanta | | 79-74 | Pondexter (26) | Vaughn (8) | Mitchell (4) | Prudential Center; 4,823 | 2-5 |
| 8 | Fri 8 | 7:00 | @ Washington | CSN-MA | 76-70 | Pondexter (25) | Walker (6) | Carson (5) | Verizon Center; 9,108 | 3-5 |
| 9 | Sun 10 | 4:00 | Chicago | MSG; CN100 | 64-73 | Pondexter (22) | Carson; Pondexter; Vaughn (6) | Pondexter (7) | Prudential Center; 5,908 | 3-6 |
| 10 | Fri 15 | 7:00 | @ Connecticut | | 55-97 | Carson (14) | Pondexter; Walker (5) | Pondexter; Vaughn (4) | Mohegan Sun Arena; 6,522 | 3-7 |
| 11 | Tue 19 | 7:00 | @ Atlanta | FS-S | 73-60 | Carson; Pondexter (14) | Pondexter (6) | Pondexter (13) | Philips Arena; 4,134 | 4-7 |
| 12 | Thu 21 | 8:00 | @ Minnesota | | 70-102 | Pondexter (30) | 4 players (5) | Pondexter (5) | Target Center; 9,050 | 4-8 |
| 13 | Sun 24 | 4:00 | Atlanta | MSG | 64-74 | Mitchell (16) | Braxton (13) | Pondexter (5) | Prudential Center; 6,754 | 4-9 |
| 14 | Sat 30 | 4:00 | Seattle | NBATV | 77-59 | Carson (22) | Pondexter (7) | Pondexter (4) | Prudential Center; 6,724 | 5-9 |

July (1–3)

| Game | Date | Time (ET) | Opponent | TV | Score | High points | High rebounds | High assists | Location/Attendance | Record |
|---|---|---|---|---|---|---|---|---|---|---|
| 15 | Fri 6 | 8:30 | @ Chicago | CN100 | 64-59 | Pondexter (19) | Carson (11) | Mitchell (4) | Allstate Arena; 4,211 | 6-9 |
| 16 | Sun 8 | 4:00 | San Antonio | NBATV; MSG | 81-94 | Carson (25) | Braxton; Pondexter (8) | Mitchell (6) | Prudential Center; 7,714 | 6-10 |
| 17 | Tue 10 | 12:00 | @ Indiana | | 82-84 | Pondexter (33) | Cain; Powell (6) | Pondexter (5) | Bankers Life Fieldhouse; 9,216 | 6-11 |
| 18 | Fri 13 | 11:00am | Washington | | 53-70 | Pondexter (22) | Carson; Powell (8) | Pondexter (3) | Prudential Center; 14,715 | 6-12 |
Summer Olympic break

August (3–4)

| Game | Date | Time (ET) | Opponent | TV | Score | High points | High rebounds | High assists | Location/Attendance | Record |
|---|---|---|---|---|---|---|---|---|---|---|
Summer Olympic break
| 19 | Thu 16 | 7:00 | Connecticut | NBATV; MSG | 79-66 | Pondexter (24) | Vaughn (7) | Pondexter (5) | Prudential Center; 5,865 | 7-12 |
| 20 | Sat 18 | 7:00 | @ Connecticut | CPTV-S | 74-85 | Carson; Pondexter (17) | Pierson (8) | Pondexter (5) | Mohegan Sun Arena; 8,232 | 7-13 |
| 21 | Tue 21 | 8:00 | @ Chicago | CN100 | 77-67 | Pondexter (25) | Braxton (7) | Mitchell (6) | Allstate Arena; 3,638 | 8-13 |
| 22 | Thu 23 | 10:00 | @ Phoenix | | 89-77 | Pondexter (31) | Braxton (9) | Mitchell (7) | US Airways Center; 7,039 | 9-13 |
| 23 | Sat 25 | 10:30 | @ Los Angeles | NBATV; TWC101 | 62-87 | Pondexter (20) | Pierson (10) | Mitchell (6) | Staples Center; 12,433 | 9-14 |
| 24 | Sun 26 | 9:00 | @ Seattle | | 66-84 | Pondexter (23) | Pierson (6) | Pierson (4) | KeyArena; 6,459 | 9-15 |
| 25 | Thu 30 | 7:00 | Indiana | NBATV; MSG | 63-76 | Carson; Pondexter (18) | Pierson; Pondexter (8) | Pierson (4) | Prudential Center; 5,315 | 9-16 |

September (6–3)

| Game | Date | Time (ET) | Opponent | TV | Score | High points | High rebounds | High assists | Location/Attendance | Record |
|---|---|---|---|---|---|---|---|---|---|---|
| 26 | Sat 1 | 4:00 | Washington | NBATV; MSG | 79-73 | Carson (20) | Pondexter (6) | Carson (6) | Prudential Center; 6,245 | 10-16 |
| 27 | Wed 5 | 7:00 | Phoenix | MSG | 87-59 | Pierson (17) | Cain (6) | Pondexter (8) | Prudential Center; 4,732 | 11-16 |
| 28 | Fri 7 | 7:30 | Chicago | MSG; CN100 | 83-92 | Pondexter (24) | Braxton (11) | Pondexter (4) | Prudential Center; 6,145 | 11-17 |
| 29 | Sun 9 | 4:00 | Los Angeles | NBATV; MSG; KDOC | 73-71 | Pondexter (21) | Pondexter (12) | Pondexter (8) | Prudential Center; 7,357 | 12-17 |
| 30 | Wed 12 | 7:00 | Washington | MSG | 75-62 | Pondexter (22) | Vaughn (10) | Pondexter (6) | Prudential Center; 5,717 | 13-17 |
| 31 | Sun 16 | 4:00 | @ Washington | NBATV | 75-68 | Pondexter (30) | Pondexter (11) | Pondexter (5) | Verizon Center; 8,087 | 14-17 |
| 32 | Tue 18 | 8:00 | @ San Antonio | ESPN2 | 66-77 | Pondexter (23) | Pierson (6) | Pierson; Pondexter (3) | AT&T Center; 6,650 | 14-18 |
| 33 | Thu 20 | 8:00 | @ Tulsa | | 66-78 | Braxton; Pierson; Pondexter (14) | Vaughn (7) | Pondexter (5) | BOK Center; 5,661 | 14-19 |
| 34 | Sat 22 | 2:00 | Tulsa | NBATV; MSG | 91-74 | Pierson (19) | Vaughn (9) | Pierson; Pondexter (5) | Prudential Center; 8,508 | 15-19 |

All games are viewable on WNBA LiveAccess or ESPN3.com

=== Postseason ===
2012 Game Log: Postseason
Eastern Conference Semifinals

| Game | Date | Time (ET) | Opponent | TV | Score | High points | High rebounds | High assists | Location/Attendance | Series |
|---|---|---|---|---|---|---|---|---|---|---|
| 1 | September 27 | 8:00 | @ Connecticut | ESPN2 | 60-65 | Pondexter (14) | Pierson (9) | Pondexter (6) | Mohegan Sun Arena; 5,520 | 0-1 |
| 2 | September 29 | 7:00 | Connecticut | NBATV | 62-75 | Pondexter (20) | Vaughn (9) | Pierson (5) | Prudential Center; 7,854 | 0-2 |

== Statistics ==
Legend
| GP | Games played | GS | Games started | MPG | Minutes per game | RPG | Rebounds per game |
| APG | Assists per game | SPG | Steals per game | BPG | Blocks per game | PPG | Points per game |
| FG% | Field-goal percentage | 3P% | 3-point field-goal percentage | FT% | Free-throw percentage | TO | Turnovers per game |
| PF | Fouls per game | | Team leader | | League leader |

=== Regular season ===
| Player | GP | GS | MPG | FG% | 3P% | FT% | RPG | APG | SPG | BPG | PPG |
