= Chucky Jeffery =

American basketball player (born 1991)

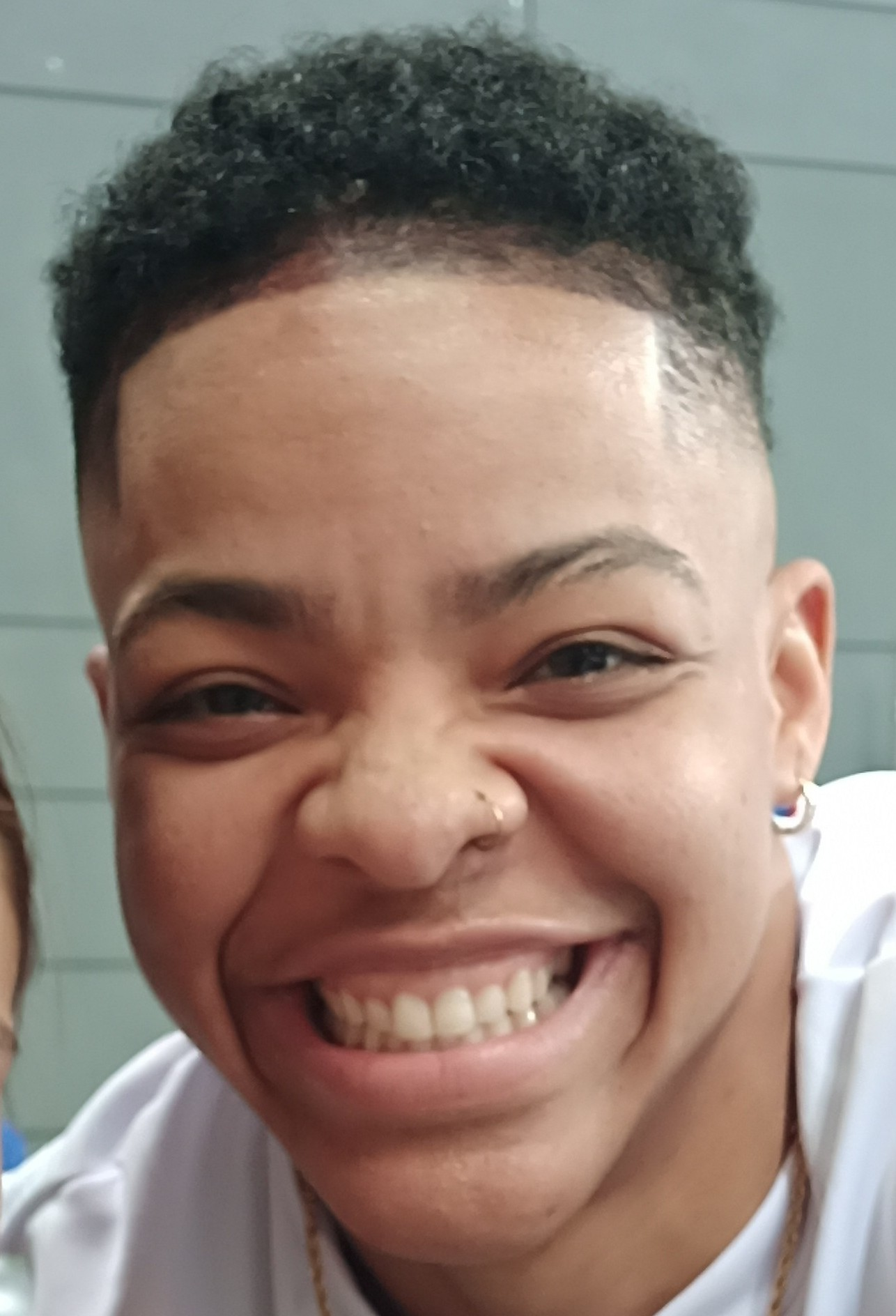

No. 0 – Sepsi Sic
- Position: Guard
- League: Romanian 1st league

Personal information
- Born: May 8, 1991 (age 35) Colorado Springs, Colorado, U.S.
- Listed height: 5 ft 10 in (1.78 m)
- Listed weight: 152 lb (69 kg)

Career information
- High school: Sierra (Colorado Springs, Colorado)
- College: Colorado (2009–2013)
- WNBA draft: 2013: 2nd round, 24th overall pick
- Drafted by: Minnesota Lynx
- Playing career: 2013–present

Career history
- 2013–2014: New York Liberty

Career highlights
- 2× All Pac-12 (2012, 2013); Pac-12 All-Defensive Team (2012)
- Stats at WNBA.com
- Stats at Basketball Reference

Janeesa "Chucky" Jeffery (born May 8, 1991) is an American professional basketball player who last played for the New York Liberty of the WNBA. She played college basketball at the University of Colorado.

== Career statistics ==
Legend
GP	Games played	GS	Games started	MPG	Minutes per game	RPG	Rebounds per game
APG	Assists per game	SPG	Steals per game	BPG	Blocks per game	PPG	Points per game
TO	Turnovers per game	FG%	Field-goal percentage	3P%	3-point field-goal percentage	FT%	Free-throw percentage
**Bold**	Career best	°	League leader

=== WNBA ===
==== Regular season ====
Year	Team	GP	GS	MPG	FG%	3P%	FT%	RPG	APG	SPG	BPG	TO	PPG
2013	New York	2	0	3.0	0.0	0.0	**100.0**	0.5	0.0	1.0	0.0	[**0.0**	1.0
2014	New York	**15**	0	**4.8**	**41.2**	0.0	25.0	**1.0**	**0.2**	**0.4**	**0.1**	0.3	1.0
Career	2 years, 1 team	17	0	4.6	36.8	0.0	50.0	0.9	0.2	0.5	0.1	0.2	1.0

=== College ===
Legend
GP	Games played	GS	Games started	MPG	Minutes per game
FG%	Field goal percentage	3P%	3-point field goal percentage	FT%	Free throw percentage
RPG	Rebounds per game	APG	Assists per game	SPG	Steals per game
BPG	Blocks per game	PPG	Points per game	**Bold**	Career high

Year	Team	GP	Points	FG%	3P%	FT%	RPG	APG	SPG	BPG	PPG
2009–10	Colorado	29	271	45.5	20.6	**75.3**	5.2	3.3	2.0	0.6	9.3
2010–11	Colorado	30	406	**47.1**	**35.1**	66.9	7.9	**4.3**	**2.5**	0.4	13.5
2011–12	Colorado	**35**	**541**	44.5	34.8	68.0	8.0	3.8	2.3	**0.8**	**15.5**
2012–13	Colorado	31	426	40.3	28.4	70.6	**8.2**	4.0	2.2	0.5	13.7
Career	Colorado	125	1373	44.1	30.7	69.7	7.4	3.8	2.3	0.6	11.0
