= 2013 New York Liberty season =

- Coach: Bill Laimbeer
- Arena: Prudential Center
- Attendance: per game

Results
- Record: 10–24 (.294)
- Place: 5th (Eastern)
- Playoff finish: Did not qualify

Media
- Television: MSG, MSG+ ESPN2, NBATV

The 2013 New York Liberty season was the 17th season for the New York Liberty franchise of the WNBA, and their 1st season under head coach, Bill Laimbeer. The season tipped off on, May 25, 2013, against the Connecticut Sun. The Liberty played at Prudential Center in New Jersey due to renovations at Madison Square Garden.

== Transactions ==
=== WNBA draft ===
The following are the Liberty's selections in the 2013 WNBA draft.

Round	Pick	Player	Nationality	School/team/country
1	5			
2	17			
3	29			

=== Trades ===
Date	Trade	
TBD	To New York Liberty	To TBD
TBD	TBD	TBD

=== Personnel changes ===
==== Additions ====
Player	Signed	Former team

==== Subtractions ====
Player	Left	New team

== Roster ==
2013 New York Liberty roster
Players
Coaches

Pos.	No.	Nat.	Name	Height	Weight	DOB	From	Yrs
F/C	3	(United States)	Bone, Kelsey	6' 4" (1.93m)		1991-12-31	Texas A&M	R
F/C	45	(United States)	Braxton, Kara	6' 6" (1.98m)	225 lb (102kg)	1983-02-18	Georgia	8
G/F	17	(United States)	Carson, Essence	6' 0" (1.83m)	165 lb (75kg)	1986-07-28	Rutgers	5
F	1	(United States)	Milton-Jones, Delisha	6' 1" (1.85m)	185 lb (84kg)	1974-09-11	Florida	14
PG	5	(United States)	Mitchell, Leilani	5' 5" (1.65m)	128 lb (58kg)	1985-06-15	Utah	5
G/F	21	(United States)	Montgomery, Alex	6' 1" (1.85m)	185 lb (84kg)	1988-11-12	Georgia Tech	2
F/C	33	(United States)	Pierson, Plenette	6' 2" (1.88m)	180 lb (82kg)	1981-08-31	Texas Tech	10
G	23	(United States)	Pondexter, Cappie	5' 9" (1.75m)	160 lb (73kg)	1983-01-07	Rutgers	7
G	30	(United States)	Smith, Katie	5' 11" (1.8m)	175 lb (79kg)	1974-06-04	Ohio State	14
G	4	(United States)	Williams, Kamiko	5' 11" (1.8m)		1991-04-06	Tennessee	R
F	15	(United States)	Young, Toni	6' 2" (1.88m)		1991-01-11	Oklahoma State	R

Head coach
(United States) Bill Laimbeer (Notre Dame)
Assistant coaches
(United States) Barbara Farris (Tulane)
(United States) Taj McWilliams-Franklin (St. Edward's)
Athletic trainer
(United States) Laura Ramus (Wayne State (MI))
Strength and conditioning coach
(United States) Kevin Duffy (Ohio)

Legend

- (C) Team captain
- (DP) Unsigned draft pick
- (FA) Free agent
- (S) Suspended
- Injured

=== Depth ===
Pos.	Starter	Bench
C	Kara Braxton	Kelsey Bone
PF	Cheryl Ford	Toni Young
SF	Plenette Pierson	Essence Carson; Alex Montgomery
SG	Cappie Pondexter	Katie Smith
PG	Leilani Mitchell	Kamiko Williams

== Season standings ==
#	Eastern Conference					
#	Team	W	L	PCT	GB	GP
1	z-Chicago Sky	24	10	.706	-	34
2	x-Atlanta Dream	17	17	.500	7	34
3	x-Washington Mystics	17	17	.500	7	34
4	x-Indiana Fever	16	18	.471	8	34
5	e-New York Liberty	11	23	.324	13	34
6	e-Connecticut Sun	10	24	.294	14	34

== Schedule ==
=== Preseason ===
2013 pre-season game log
Total: 1–2 (Home: 1–0; Road: 0–2)
Pre-season: 1–2 (Home: 1–0; Road: 0–2)

Game	Date	Team	Score	High points	High rebounds	High assists	Location Attendance	Record
1	May 11	@ Connecticut	L 74–83	Williams, Pierson, & Montgomery (12)	Essence Carson (5)	Alex Montgomery (5)	Mohegan Sun Arena; 6692	0–1
2	May 15	@ Chicago	L 67–85	Pondexter & Montgomery (14)	Alex Montgomery (8)	Kara Braxton (4)	Jacoby Dickens Center; 1250	0–2
3	May 18	Connecticut	W 78–67	Cappie Pondexter (14)	Pondexter & Bone (6)	Essence Carson (5)	Prudential Center; 1945	1–2

2013 season schedule

=== Regular season ===
2013 game log
Total: 11–23 (Home: 6–11; Road: 5–12)
May: 1–1 (Home: 1–0; Road: 0–1)

Game	Date	Team	Score	High points	High rebounds	High assists	Location Attendance	Record
1	May 25	@ Connecticut	L 69–81	Cappie Pondexter (23)	Kara Braxton (9)	Pondexter & Williams (4)	Mohegan Sun Arena; 7672	0–1
2	May 31	Tulsa	W 78–76 (OT)	Essence Carson (18)	Braxton & Pondexter (8)	Cappie Pondexter (6)	Prudential Center; 7532	1–1

June : 4–3 (Home: 3–1; Road: 1–2)

Game	Date	Team	Score	High points	High rebounds	High assists	Location Attendance	Record
3	June 5	Indiana	W 75–68 (OT)	Essence Carson (21)	Braxton & Montgomery (7)	Leilani Mitchell (3)	Prudential Center; 7617	2–1
4	June 7	@ Atlanta	L 56–75	Kara Braxton (14)	Alex Montgomery (12)	Pierson & Montgomery (4)	Philips Arena; 6173	2–2
5	June 9	Atlanta	W 76–67	Pierson & Pondexter (17)	Leilani Mitchell (7)	Cappie Pondexter (6)	Prudential Center; 5933	3–2
6	June 14	Connecticut	W 78–68	Cappie Pondexter (20)	Kara Braxton (13)	Leilani Mitchell (5)	Prudential Center; 5845	4–2
7	June 23	San Antonio	L 77–78 (OT)	Cappie Pondexter (19)	Cappie Pondexter (11)	Pondexter & Mitchell (6)	Prudential Center; 6123	4–3
8	June 26	@ Chicago	L 74–87	Cappie Pondexter (21)	Kelsey Bone (9)	Leilani Mitchell (7)	Allstate Arena; 8911	4–4
9	June 28	@ Seattle	W 67–62	Cappie Pondexter (23)	Kara Braxton (14)	Smith, Braxton, & Pondexter (3)	Key Arena; 7687	5–4

July : 3–7 (Home: 1–3; Road: 2–4)

Game	Date	Team	Score	High points	High rebounds	High assists	Location Attendance	Record
10	July 2	@ Phoenix	L 87–94	Cappie Pondexter (17)	Kamiko Williams (9)	Alex Montgomery (4)	US Airways Center; 7636	5–5
11	July 4	@ Los Angeles	L 89–97	Cappie Pondexter (34)	Kelsey Bone (8)	Cappie Pondexter (6)	Staples Center; 8565	5–6
12	July 7	Chicago	L 64–93	Cappie Pondexter (18)	Kelsey Bone (8)	Mitchell & Pondexter (4)	Prudential Center; 7127	5–7
13	July 9	Seattle	W 66–57	Plenette Pierson (22)	Kara Braxton (11)	Cappie Pondexter (4)	Prudential Center; 5766	6–7
14	July 13	Indiana	L 53–74	Plenette Pierson (12)	Alex Montgomery (11)	Bone, Braxton, Pondexter, Montgomery, Williams, & Mitchell (1)	Prudential Center; 6772	6–8
15	July 18	Chicago	L 55–75	Pierson & Bone (11)	Kelsey Bone (8)	Alex Montgomery (3)	Prudential Center; 12858	6–9
16	July 20	@ Chicago	L 69–80	Cappie Pondexter (22)	Plenette Pierson (11)	Pondexter & Mitchell (4)	Allstate Arena; 6037	6–10
17	July 23	@ Indiana	W 77–72	Cappie Pondexter (24)	Pierson & Montgomery (11)	Plenette Pierson (7)	Bankers Life Fieldhouse; 7577	7–10
18	July 25	@ San Antonio	L 53–65	Cappie Pondexter (20)	Kara Braxton (7)	Cappie Pondexter (3)	AT&T Center; 12086	7–11
All-Star Break
19	July 31	@ Washington	W 88–78	Kara Braxton (22)	Kelsey Bone (11)	Cappie Pondexter (9)	Verizon Center; 6711	8–11

August : 3–7 (Home: 1–5; Road: 2–2)

Game	Date	Team	Score	High points	High rebounds	High assists	Location Attendance	Record
20	August 3	Connecticut	L 66–88	Kara Braxton (18)	Kelsey Bone (9)	Cappie Pondexter (5)	Prudential Center; 6245	8–12
21	August 6	Washington	W 93–88	Pondexter & Montgomery (21)	Pierson & Bone (6)	Plenette Pierson (10)	Prudential Center; 8907	9–12
22	August 10	Los Angeles	L 67–85	Cappie Pondexter (22)	Kara Braxton (9)	Pierson & Braxton (3)	Prudential Center; 7569	9–13
23	August 11	@ Atlanta	W 88–82	Cappie Pondexter (33)	Plenette Pierson (12)	Cappie Pondexter (7)	Philips Arena; 4576	10–13
24	August 16	Washington	L 57–66	Katie Smith (14)	Kara Braxton (9)	Alex Montgomery (5)	Prudential Center; 6157	10–14
25	August 18	@ Minnesota	L 57–88	Smith & Montgomery (11)	DeLisha Milton-Jones (8)	DeLisha Milton-Jones (5)	Target Center; 9004	10–15
26	August 23	@ Chicago	L 64–82	Plenette Pierson (25)	Kelsey Bone (7)	Cappie Pondexter (6)	Allstate Arena; 5888	10–16
27	August 25	@ Connecticut	W 74–66	Plenette Pierson (18)	Kara Braxton (7)	Alex Montgomery (4)	Mohegan Sun Arena; 7004	11–16
28	August 27	Minnesota	L 47–73	Cappie Pondexter (13)	DeLisha Milton-Jones (7)	Plenette Pierson (3)	Prudential Center; 5997	11–17
29	August 30	Indiana	L 67–73	Kelsey Bone (13)	Alex Montgomery (9)	Pondexter & Mitchell (3)	Prudential Center; 6621	11–18

September: 0–5 (Home: 0–2; Road: 0–3)

Game	Date	Team	Score	High points	High rebounds	High assists	Location Attendance	Record
30	September 1	@ Tulsa	L 88–93	Braxton & Pondexter (20)	Kara Braxton (15)	Cappie Pondexter (6)	BOK Center; 5818	11–19
31	September 6	Atlanta	L 57–70	Kara Braxton (17)	Plenette Pierson (8)	Alex Montgomery (4)	Prudential Center; 7021	11–20
32	September 10	Phoenix	L 76–80	Katie Smith (17)	Plenette Pierson (15)	Plenette Pierson (6)	Prudential Center; 8127	11–21
33	September 13	@ Indiana	L 63–66	DeLisha Milton-Jones (18)	Kara Braxton (8)	Pierson & Montgomery (5)	Bankers Life Fieldhouse; 10571	11–22
34	September 15	@ Washington	L 52–70	Kelsey Bone (11)	Plenette Pierson (11)	Plenette Pierson (4)	Verizon Center; 9454	11–23

2013 season schedule

== Statistics ==
Legend
GP	Games played	GS	Games started	MPG	Minutes per game	RPG	Rebounds per game
APG	Assists per game	SPG	Steals per game	BPG	Blocks per game	PPG	Points per game
FG%	Field-goal percentage	3P%	3-point field-goal percentage	FT%	Free-throw percentage	TO	Turnovers per game
PF	Fouls per game		Team leader		League leader

=== Regular season ===
Player	GP	GS	MPG	FG%	3P%	FT%	RPG	APG	SPG	BPG	PPG
