= 2011 New York Liberty season =

- Head coach: John Whisenant
- Arena: Prudential Center

Results
- Record: 19–15 (.559)
- Place: 4th (Eastern)
- Playoff finish: Lost in Conference Semifinals

Media
- Television: MSG, MSG+ ESPN2, NBATV

The 2011 WNBA season was the 15th season for the New York Liberty of the Women's National Basketball Association. The Liberty played at Prudential Center in New Jersey from 2011 through 2013 during renovations at Madison Square Garden.

== Transactions ==
=== WNBA draft ===
The following are the Liberty's selections in the 2011 WNBA draft.

| Round | Pick | Player | Nationality | School/team/country |
|---|---|---|---|---|
| 1 | 10 | Alex Montgomery | United States | Georgia Tech |
| 2 | 22 | Angel Robinson | United States | Marquette |
| 3 | 34 | Mekia Valentine | United States | UC Santa Barbara |

=== Transaction log ===
- March 14: The Liberty re-signed Sidney Spencer.
- April 6: The Liberty signed Ewelina Kobryn to a training camp contract.
- April 11: The Liberty traded draft rights to Angel Robinson and a second-round pick in the 2012 draft to the Minnesota Lynx in exchange for draft rights to Jessica Breland.
- April 11: The Liberty traded Kalana Greene to the Connecticut Sun in exchange for draft rights to Sydney Colson.
- May 16: The Liberty signed Whitney Boddie and Crystal Kelly to training camp contracts.
- May 27: The Liberty acquired Quanitra Hollingsworth from the Minnesota Lynx in exchange for the right to swap third-round picks in the 2012 draft.
- June 1: The Liberty waived Mekia Valentine, Whitney Boddie, Crystal Kelly, and Ewelina Kobryn.
- July 4: The Liberty waived Jessica Breland and signed Felicia Chester.
- July 21: The Liberty waived Felicia Chester.
- July 28: The Liberty signed Ta'Shia Phillips.
- August 4: The Liberty traded Sidney Spencer to the Phoenix Mercury in exchange for Kara Braxton.

=== Trades ===
| Date | Trade | |
|---|---|---|
| April 11, 2011 | To New York Liberty | To Minnesota Lynx |
| April 11, 2011 | Jessica Breland | Angel Robinson and a second-round pick in 2012 draft |
| April 11, 2011 | To New York Liberty | To Connecticut Sun |
| April 11, 2011 | Sydney Colson | Kalana Greene |
| May 27, 2011 | To New York Liberty | To Minnesota Lynx |
| May 27, 2011 | Quanitra Hollingsworth | right to swap third-round picks in 2012 draft |
| August 4, 2011 | To New York Liberty | To Phoenix Mercury |
| August 4, 2011 | Kara Braxton | Sidney Spencer |

=== Personnel changes ===
==== Additions ====
| Player | Signed | Former team |
| Alex Montgomery | April 11, 2011 | draft pick |
| Sydney Colson | April 11, 2011 | draft pick (from Conn.) |
| Jessica Breland | April 11, 2011 | draft pick (from Minn.) |
| Quanitra Hollingsworth | May 27, 2011 | Minnesota Lynx |
| Ta'Shia Phillips | July 28, 2011 | free agent |
| Kara Braxton | August 4, 2011 | Phoenix Mercury |

==== Subtractions ====
| Player | Left | New team |
| Taj McWilliams-Franklin | February 18, 2011 | Minnesota Lynx |
| Kalana Greene | April 11, 2011 | Connecticut Sun |
| Nikki Blue | May 15, 2011 | free agent |
| Janel McCarville | June 1, 2011 | hiatus |
| Jessica Breland | July 4, 2011 | free agent |
| Sidney Spencer | August 4, 2011 | Phoenix Mercury |

== Roster ==
2011 New York Liberty roster
Players
Coaches

| Pos. | No. | Nat. | Name | Height | Weight | DOB | From | Yrs |
|---|---|---|---|---|---|---|---|---|
| F/C | 45 | (United States) | Braxton, Kara | 6' 6" (1.98m) | 225 lb (102kg) | 1983-02-18 | Georgia | 6 |
| G/F | 17 | (United States) | Carson, Essence | 6' 0" (1.83m) | 165 lb (75kg) | 1986-07-28 | Rutgers | 3 |
| G | 50 | (United States) | Colson, Sydney | 5' 8" (1.73m) | 140 lb (64kg) | 1989-08-06 | Texas A&M | R |
| C | 9 | (United States) | Hollingsworth, Quanitra | 6' 5" (1.96m) | 200 lb (91kg) | 1988-11-15 | VCU | 2 |
| PG | 5 | (United States) | Mitchell, Leilani | 5' 5" (1.65m) | 128 lb (58kg) | 1985-06-15 | Utah | 3 |
| G/F | 22 | (United States) | Montgomery, Alex | 6' 1" (1.85m) | 185 lb (84kg) | 1988-11-12 | Georgia Tech | R |
| C | 53 | (United States) | Phillips, Ta'Shia | 6' 6" (1.98m) | 198 lb (90kg) | 1989-01-24 | Xavier | R |
| F/C | 33 | (United States) | Pierson, Plenette | 6' 2" (1.88m) | 180 lb (82kg) | 1981-08-31 | Texas Tech | 8 |
| G | 23 | (United States) | Pondexter, Cappie | 5' 9" (1.75m) | 160 lb (73kg) | 1983-01-07 | Rutgers | 5 |
| F | 14 | (United States) | Powell, Nicole | 6' 2" (1.88m) | 170 lb (77kg) | 1982-06-22 | Stanford | 7 |
| C | 15 | (United States) | Vaughn, Kia | 6' 4" (1.93m) | 198 lb (90kg) | 1987-01-24 | Rutgers | 2 |

Head coach
(United States) John Whisenant (New Mexico State)
Assistant coaches
(United States) Monique Ambers (Arizona State)
(United States) Lady Grooms (Georgia)
Athletic trainer
(United States) Lisa White (Stony Brook)
Strength and conditioning coach
(United States) Kevin Duffy (Ohio)

Legend

- (C) Team captain
- (DP) Unsigned draft pick
- (FA) Free agent
- (S) Suspended
- Injured

=== Depth ===
| Pos. | Starter | Bench |
|---|---|---|
| C | Kia Vaughn | Quanitra Hollingsworth |
| PF | Plenette Pierson | Kara Braxton; Ta'Shia Phillips |
| SF | Nicole Powell | Alex Montgomery |
| SG | Cappie Pondexter | Essence Carson |
| PG | Leilani Mitchell | Sydney Colson |

== Season standings ==
| Eastern Conference | W | L | PCT | GB | Home | Road | Conf. |
|---|---|---|---|---|---|---|---|
| Indiana Fever ^{x} | 21 | 13 | .618 | – | 13–4 | 8–9 | 13–9 |
| Connecticut Sun ^{x} | 21 | 13 | .618 | – | 15–2 | 6–11 | 14–8 |
| Atlanta Dream ^{x} | 20 | 14 | .588 | 1.0 | 11–6 | 9–8 | 14–8 |
| New York Liberty ^{x} | 19 | 15 | .559 | 2.0 | 12-5 | 7–10 | 11–11 |
| Chicago Sky ^{o} | 14 | 20 | .412 | 7.0 | 10–7 | 4–13 | 10–12 |
| Washington Mystics ^{o} | 6 | 28 | .176 | 15.0 | 4–13 | 2–15 | 4–18 |

== Schedule ==
=== Preseason ===
2011 Game Log: Preseason

| Game | Date | Time (ET) | Opponent | Score | High points | High rebounds | High assists | Location/Attendance | Record |
|---|---|---|---|---|---|---|---|---|---|
| 1 | May 25 | 10:30am | Washington | 57–60 | Vaughn (10) | Powell (5) | Powell (4) | Prudential Center; 6,472 | 0–1 |
| 2 | May 27 | 7:00pm | China | 79–65 | N/A | N/A | N/A | Times Union Center; N/A | 1–1 |

=== Regular season ===
2011 Game Log: Regular Season
June

| Game | Date | Time (ET) | Opponent | TV | Score | High points | High rebounds | High assists | Location/Attendance | Record |
|---|---|---|---|---|---|---|---|---|---|---|
| 1 | June 5 | 3:00pm | @ Atlanta | SSO | 94–88 (OT) | Pierson (25) | Pierson (10) | Pondexter (11) | Philips Arena; 8,038 | 1–0 |
| 2 | June 10 | 7:00pm | @ Indiana | | 81–80 | Pondexter (21) | Vaughn (9) | Powell (4) | Conseco Fieldhouse; 7,703 | 2–0 |
| 3 | June 11 | 7:00pm | Indiana | MSG | 80–86 | Carson (23) | Pierson (6) | Powell (5) | Prudential Center; 7,835 | 2–1 |
| 4 | June 14 | 7:00pm | Atlanta | | 58–79 | Carson (21) | Carson (8) | Powell (2) | Prudential Center; 5,725 | 2–2 |
| 5 | June 17 | 8:30pm | @ Chicago | CN100 | 73–85 | Pondexter (20) | Pondexter (8) | Carson (5) | Allstate Arena; 5,718 | 2–3 |
| 6 | June 21 | 10:00pm | @ Los Angeles | ESPN2 | 91–96 | Pondexter (22) | Vaughn (12) | Pondexter; Powell (6) | Staples Center; 10,389 | 2–4 |
| 7 | June 23 | 12:30pm | @ Tulsa | | 94–82 | Vaughn (24) | Vaughn (12) | Pondexter (10) | BOK Center; 4,682 | 3–4 |
| 8 | June 26 | 4:00pm | Los Angeles | | 77–67 | Pondexter (22) | Vaughn (8) | Pondexter (5) | Prudential Center; 7,625 | 4–4 |
| 9 | June 30 | 7:30pm | @ Atlanta | SSO | 81–87 | Pondexter (24) | Pierson; Vaughn (7) | Pondexter (6) | Philips Arena; 4,423 | 4–5 |

July

| Game | Date | Time (ET) | Opponent | TV | Score | High points | High rebounds | High assists | Location/Attendance | Record |
|---|---|---|---|---|---|---|---|---|---|---|
| 10 | July 1 | 7:00pm | San Antonio | NBATV | 81–75 | Pondexter (19) | Hollingsworth; Vaughn (7) | Pondexter (5) | Prudential Center; 6,714 | 5–5 |
| 11 | July 8 | 8:00pm | @ San Antonio | NBATV | 76–73 | Pondexter (20) | Pierson (10) | Pondexter (7) | AT&T Center; 8,100 | 6–5 |
| 12 | July 10 | 4:00pm | Chicago | NBATV; MSG+ CN100 | 80–73 | Carson; Pondexter (18) | Powell (8) | Pondexter; Powell (4) | Prudential Center; 7,315 | 7–5 |
| 13 | July 13 | 12:00pm | Atlanta | | 91–69 | Powell (20) | Powell (7) | Carson; Mitchell; Pondexter (5) | Prudential Center; 14,314 | 8–5 |
| 14 | July 15 | 7:00pm | Connecticut | NBATV; CSN-NE | 59–68 | Vaughn (15) | Vaughn (9) | Mitchell (4) | Prudential Center; 7,722 | 8–6 |
| 15 | July 17 | 4:00pm | Tulsa | NBATV; MSG+ | 88–57 | Pondexter (18) | Vaughn (8) | Mitchell; Pondexter; Powell (3) | Prudential Center; 6,735 | 9–6 |
| 16 | July 19 | 7:30pm | @ Connecticut | | 79–85 | Pierson (18) | Powell (11) | Pondexter (10) | Mohegan Sun Arena; 6,096 | 9–7 |
All-Star break
| 17 | July 28 | 7:00pm | Washington | MSG | 75–71 | Pondexter (19) | Hollingsworth (7) | Pierson; Pondexter (4) | Prudential Center; 6,808 | 10–7 |
| 18 | July 30 | 7:00pm | Phoenix | NBATV; MSG+ | 84–91 | Powell (16) | Vaughn (10) | Vaughn (4) | Prudential Center; 7,214 | 10–8 |

August

| Game | Date | Time (ET) | Opponent | TV | Score | High points | High rebounds | High assists | Location/Attendance | Record |
|---|---|---|---|---|---|---|---|---|---|---|
| 19 | August 2 | 7:30pm | @ Atlanta | FS-S | 85–75 | Pierson (20) | Pierson (8) | Mitchell (6) | Philips Arena; 4,573 | 11–8 |
| 20 | August 4 | 12:00pm | Chicago | NBATV; MSG | 59–49 | Pondexter (15) | Powell (10) | Carson; Pondexter (3) | Prudential Center; 10,133 | 12–8 |
| 21 | August 6 | 7:00pm | @ Washington | NBATV | 81–91 | Pondexter (21) | Hollingsworth (7) | Pondexter (7) | Verizon Center; 10,741 | 12–9 |
| 22 | August 9 | 8:00pm | Seattle | ESPN2 | 58–56 | Pondexter (19) | Pierson (8) | Pondexter (5) | Prudential Center; 6,732 | 13–9 |
| 23 | August 12 | 7:00pm | @ Washington | | 63–64 | Mitchell (18) | Hollingsworth (8) | Mitchell (6) | Verizon Center; 10,092 | 13–10 |
| 24 | August 13 | 7:00pm | @ Indiana | NBATV | 71–82 | Pondexter (30) | Pondexter (8) | Pondexter (5) | Conseco Fieldhouse; 9,237 | 13–11 |
| 25 | August 16 | 7:00pm | Washington | | 69–66 | Pondexter (26) | Vaughn (7) | Powell (5) | Prudential Center; 6,223 | 14–11 |
| 26 | August 18 | 7:00pm | Connecticut | NBATV; MSG | 84–81 (OT) | Pondexter (27) | Vaughn (11) | Pondexter (4) | Prudential Center; 7,245 | 15–11 |
| 27 | August 20 | 10:00pm | @ Seattle | | 62–63 | Pierson (15) | Pondexter (6) | Pondexter (6) | KeyArena; 7,139 | 15–12 |
| 28 | August 23 | 10:00pm | @ Phoenix | ESPN2 | 74–70 | Pondexter (25) | Pondexter (8) | Pierson (5) | US Airways Center; 8,871 | 16–12 |
| 29 | August 28 | 6:00pm | @ Chicago | NBATV; CN100 | 73–74 | Pierson (19) | Vaughn (8) | Pondexter (8) | Allstate Arena; 5,707 | 16–13 |
| 30 | August 30 | 7:00pm | Chicago | MSG+ CN100 | 71–67 | Pondexter (19) | Pierson (8) | Pondexter; Powell (3) | Prudential Center; 6,334 | 17–13 |

September

| Game | Date | Time (ET) | Opponent | TV | Score | High points | High rebounds | High assists | Location/Attendance | Record |
|---|---|---|---|---|---|---|---|---|---|---|
| 31 | September 2 | 8:00pm | @ Minnesota | | 78–62 | Mitchell (24) | Hollingsworth (9) | Pondexter (7) | Target Center; 8,929 | 18–13 |
| 32 | September 4 | 4:00pm | Minnesota | | 68–86 | Pierson (17) | Pierson (8) | Pondexter (7) | Prudential Center; 8,247 | 18–14 |
| 33 | September 9 | 7:00pm | Indiana | NBATV; MSG+ | 83–75 | Carson (18) | Vaughn (9) | Vaughn (5) | Prudential Center; 8,015 | 19–14 |
| 34 | September 11 | 1:00pm | @ Connecticut | NBATV | 63–69 | Powell (14) | Pondexter; Vaughn (9) | Pondexter (5) | Mohegan Sun Arena; 9,115 | 19–15 |

All games are viewable on WNBA LiveAccess or ESPN3.com

=== Postseason ===
2011 Game Log: Postseason
Eastern Conference Semifinals

| Game | Date | Time (ET) | Opponent | TV | Score | High points | High rebounds | High assists | Location/Attendance | Series |
|---|---|---|---|---|---|---|---|---|---|---|
| 1 | September 15 | 8:00pm | @ Indiana | ESPN2 | 72–74 | Pondexter (18) | Powell (8) | Pondexter (6) | Conseco Fieldhouse; 7,608 | 0–1 |
| 2 | September 17 | 4:00pm | Indiana | NBATV; MSG | 87-72 | Powell (19) | Pondexter; Powell; Vaughn (5) | Pondexter (5) | Prudential Center; 8,508 | 1–1 |
| 3 | September 19 | 8:00pm | @ Indiana | ESPN2 | 62-72 | Powell (19) | Vaughn (7) | Pondexter (5) | Conseco Fieldhouse; 7,368 | 1–2 |

== Statistics ==
Legend
| GP | Games played | GS | Games started | MPG | Minutes per game | RPG | Rebounds per game |
| APG | Assists per game | SPG | Steals per game | BPG | Blocks per game | PPG | Points per game |
| FG% | Field-goal percentage | 3P% | 3-point field-goal percentage | FT% | Free-throw percentage | TO | Turnovers per game |
| PF | Fouls per game | | Team leader | | League leader |

=== Regular season ===
| Player | GP | GS | MPG | FG% | 3P% | FT% | RPG | APG | SPG | BPG | PPG |
|---|---|---|---|---|---|---|---|---|---|---|---|
| Kara Braxton | 13 | 0 | 12.8 | .397 | .333 | .400 | 3.0 | 0.8 | 0.38 | 0.46 | 3.9 |
| Jessica Breland | 9 | 0 | 7.7 | .381 | .000 | 1.000 | 1.6 | 0.4 | 0.20 | 0.70 | 2.0 |
| Essence Carson | 32 | 5 | 22.7 | .437 | .387 | .738 | 2.8 | 1.7 | 1.19 | 0.63 | 11.3 |
| Felicia Chester | 4 | 0 | 6.8 | .333 | .000 | .000 | 2.0 | 0.0 | 0.25 | 0.00 | 0.5 |
| Sydney Colson | 16 | 0 | 5.4 | .350 | .429 | .833 | 0.4 | 0.6 | 0.25 | 0.13 | 1.4 |
| Quanitra Hollingsworth | 31 | 1 | 16.9 | .524 | .000 | .679 | 4.4 | 0.3 | 0.52 | 0.32 | 4.6 |
| Leilani Mitchell | 34 | 30 | 25.4 | .375 | .364 | .800 | 2.1 | 2.9 | 1.29 | 0.09 | 5.6 |
| Alex Montgomery | 30 | 0 | 9.0 | .329 | .444 | .647 | 1.8 | 0.7 | 0.33 | 0.23 | 2.5 |
| Ta'Shia Phillips | 5 | 0 | 3.6 | .500 | .000 | .500 | 0.6 | 0.2 | 0.00 | 0.00 | 0.6 |
| Plenette Pierson | 33 | 33 | 28.6 | .478 | .200 | .806 | 5.2 | 1.4 | 1.15 | 0.91 | 12.9 |
| Cappie Pondexter | 34 | 34 | 33.9 | .402 | .345 | .813 | 4.1 | 4.7 | 1.26 | 0.29 | 17.4 |
| Nicole Powell | 33 | 33 | 28.3 | .410 | .353 | .906 | 4.2 | 2.3 | 1.36 | 0.30 | 9.7 |
| Sidney Spencer | 16 | 0 | 7.1 | .500 | .333 | 1.000 | 0.8 | 0.3 | 0.00 | 0.00 | 2.5 |
| Kia Vaughn | 34 | 34 | 28.1 | .497 | .000 | .786 | 6.7 | 1.1 | 1.18 | 0.74 | 10.1 |

=== Postseason ===
| Player | GP | GS | MPG | FG% | 3P% | FT% | RPG | APG | SPG | BPG | PPG |
|---|---|---|---|---|---|---|---|---|---|---|---|
| Kara Braxton | | | | | | | | | | | |
| Essence Carson | | | | | | | | | | | |
| Sydney Colson | | | | | | | | | | | |
| Quanitra Hollingsworth | | | | | | | | | | | |
| Leilani Mitchell | | | | | | | | | | | |
| Alex Montgomery | | | | | | | | | | | |
| Ta'Shia Phillips | | | | | | | | | | | |
| Plenette Pierson | | | | | | | | | | | |
| Cappie Pondexter | | | | | | | | | | | |
| Nicole Powell | | | | | | | | | | | |
| Kia Vaughn | | | | | | | | | | | |

== Awards and honors ==
- Cappie Pondexter was named WNBA Eastern Conference Player of the Week for the week of June 20, 2011.
- Cappie Pondexter was named WNBA Eastern Conference Player of the Week for the week of July 4, 2011.
- Essence Carson was named to the 2011 WNBA All-Star Team as a reserve.
- Cappie Pondexter was named to the 2011 WNBA All-Star Team as a starter.
- Kia Vaughn was named the Most Improved Player.
- Cappie Pondexter was named to the All-WNBA Second Team.
