= Leilani Mitchell =

American-Australian basketball player (born 1985)

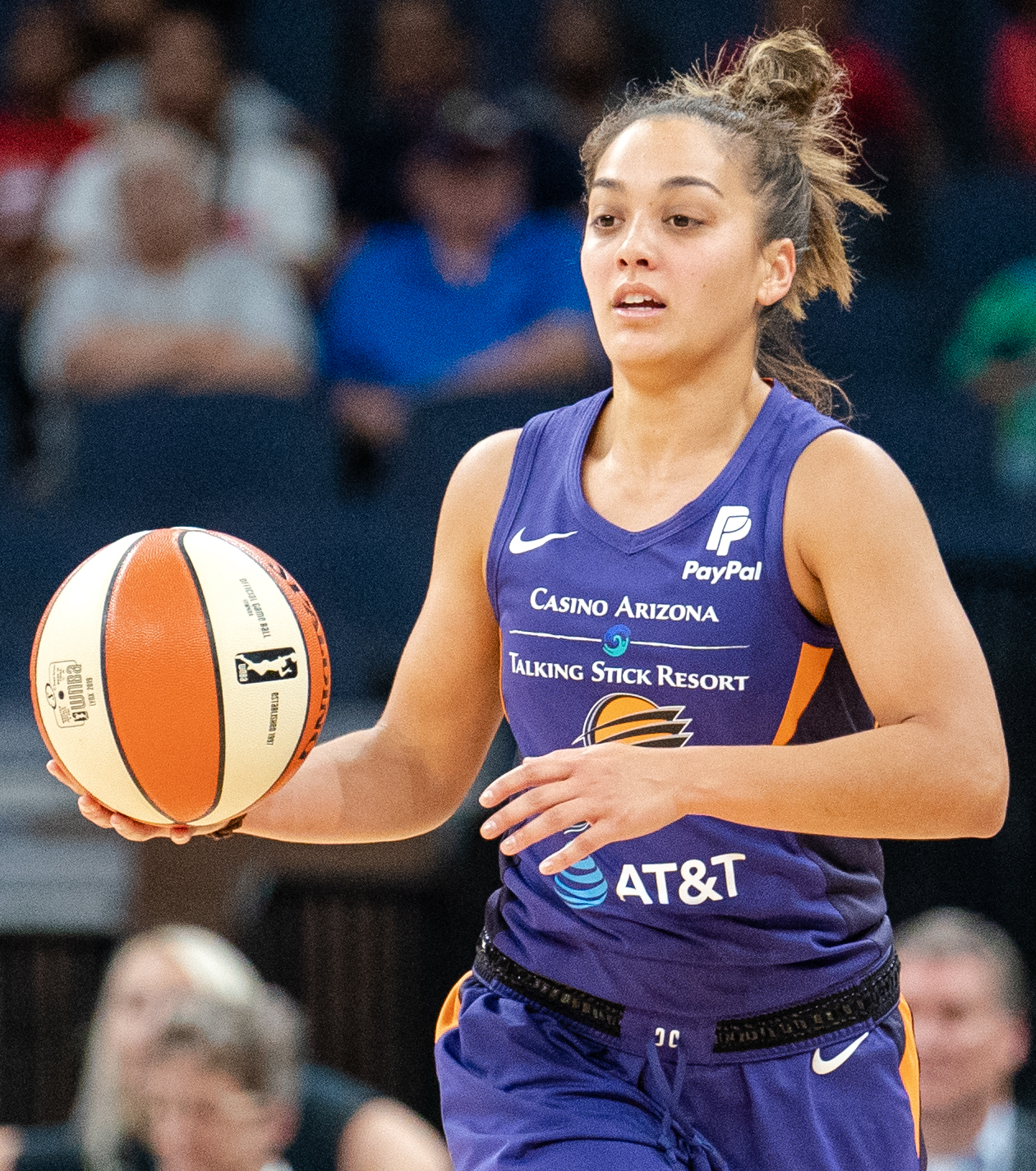
- Mitchell with the Phoenix Mercury in 2019

No. 5 – Southside Flyers
- Position: Point guard
- League: WNBL

Personal information
- Born: 15 June 1985 (age 41) Richland, Washington, U.S.
- Listed height: 5 ft 5 in (1.65 m)
- Listed weight: 138 lb (63 kg)

Career information
- High school: Kennewick (Kennewick, Washington)
- College: Idaho (2003–2006); Utah (2007–2008)
- WNBA draft: 2008: 2nd round, 25th overall pick
- Drafted by: Phoenix Mercury
- Playing career: 2008–present

Career history
- 2008-2013: New York Liberty
- 2008–2012: ASPTT Arras
- 2012–2013: ŽKK Novi Zagreb
- 2013–2014: Dandenong Rangers
- 2014–2015: Sydney Uni Flames
- 2015: Phoenix Mercury
- 2015–2016: Adelaide Lightning
- 2016: Washington Mystics
- 2016–2017: Sydney Uni Flames
- 2017–2019: Phoenix Mercury
- 2018–2019: Canberra Capitals
- 2019–2021: Southside Flyers
- 2020–2021: Washington Mystics
- 2021–2022: Bendigo Spirit
- 2023–present: Southside Flyers

Career highlights
- 2× WNBA Most Improved Player (2010, 2019); 4× WNBL champion (2017, 2019, 2020, 2024); 2× WNBL Grand Final Most Valuable Player (2017, 2020); 3× WNBL All-Star Five (2014, 2016, 2017); Third-team All-American – AP (2008); MWC Player of the Year (2008); First-team All-MWC (2008); WAC All-Defensive Team (2006); 2× First-team All-Big West (2004, 2005); Big West Freshman of the Year (2004); Big West All-Freshman Team (2004)
- Stats at WNBA.com
- Stats at Basketball Reference

Leilani Seamah Mitchell (born 15 June 1985) is an American-Australian professional basketball player for the Southside Flyers of the Women's National Basketball League (WNBL). Mitchell was drafted 25th overall by the Phoenix Mercury in the 2008 WNBA draft. A dual citizen of the United States and Australia, she is a member of Australian women's national basketball team (the Opals). In 2019 Mitchell became the first WNBA player to win the Most Improved Player Award twice.

Mitchell was a member of the Australian Women's basketball team (Opals) at the 2020 Tokyo Olympics. The Opals were eliminated after losing to the USA in the quarterfinals.

== Early life ==
Mitchell was born in Richland, Washington and is the only daughter of Dennis Mitchell and Eleanor Majid. Her father is American and her mother is Australian. She has five brothers: Tyler, Troy, Travis, Reggie, and Robbie. Mitchell has dual citizenship with both the United States of America and Australia. Mitchell's mother died from cancer in 2009.

== High school career ==
Mitchell attended Kennewick High School in Kennewick, Washington. Mitchell was a four-year starter at Kennewick High School. Mitchell was named first-team all-state and all-conference as a junior and senior at Kennewick High School and earned Big Nine Conference Player of the Year honors as a senior. In four consecutive years, Mitchell led Kennewick High School to state championship games, including Kennewick's title-winning season of 2000.`

== College career ==
=== University of Idaho ===
Mitchell played for Idaho Vandals from 2003 to 2006. At Idaho, she was named the 2004 Big West Freshman of the Year and set numerous school records. Mitchell finished her career ranking fifth in points (1,471), third in points per game (17.0), ninth in field goals made (441), third in 3-point field goals made (164), free throws made (433), and free throws attempted (514), second in free throws percentage (.842), second in assists (504), and first in steals (323).

=== University of Utah ===
Mitchell transferred from Idaho to the University of Utah. She sat out the 2006–07 season under NCAA rules, and then played the 2007–08 season for Utah. In her lone season at Utah, Mitchell led the Utes to a 27–5 record in the 2007–08 NCAA season. She recorded 240 assists, the second most assists in program history. Mitchell won five Mountain West Conference Player of the Week awards, more than any other player in the conference. After the regular season, Mitchell was named the Mountain West Conference Player of the Year in separate votes by Mountain West coaches and media. Mitchell finished her college career as one of only six NCAA Division I players since 1999–2000 to compile 2,000 points/500 rebounds/500 assists/300 steals in her career.

== Professional career ==
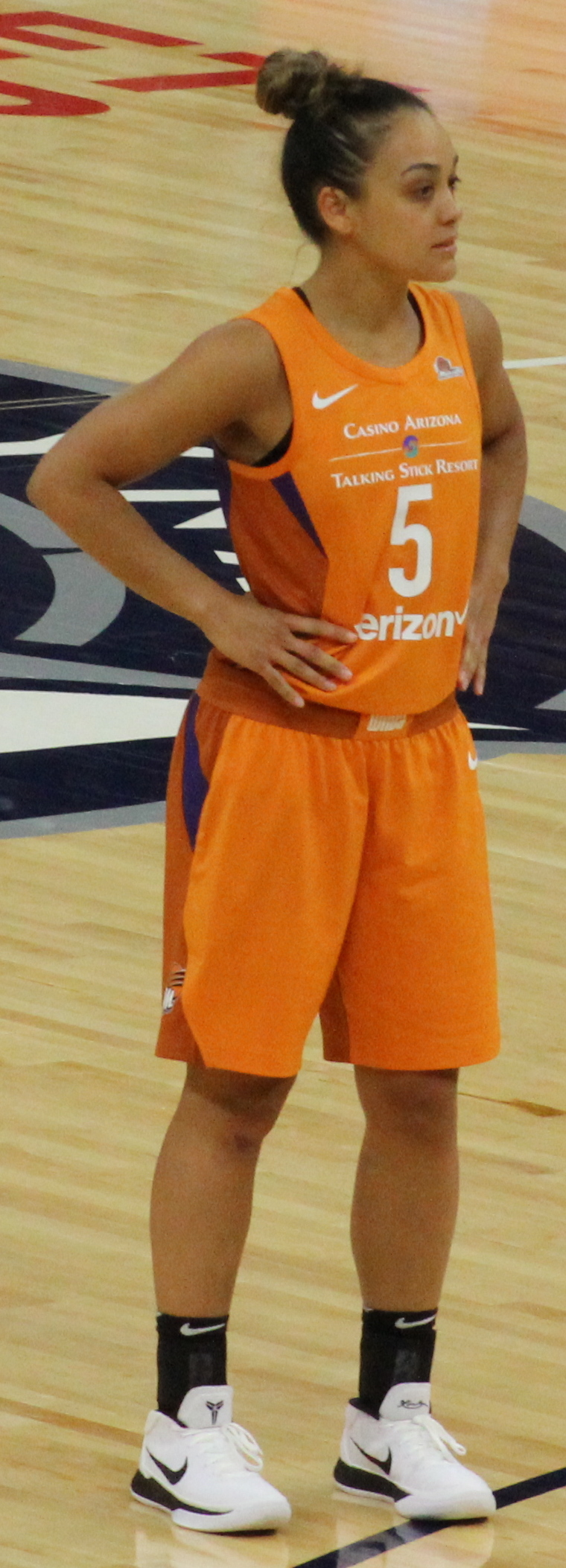
Mitchell in 2018

Mitchell was drafted by the Phoenix Mercury twenty-fifth overall in the second round of 2008 WNBA draft. Mitchell was then traded to the New York Liberty during the 2008 pre-season after the Liberty acquired Mitchell in a trade in exchange for a 2009 third round draft pick. Initially a bench player, Mitchell made her first professional start on 6 June 2008, in place of the injured Loree Moore. In her first career start against the Houston Comets she had team-high 18 points going perfect 6–6 from the floor including 3–3 from three-point range. During the 2008 season she developed a strong fan following and a reputation for fearlessness in grabbing loose balls and occasionally driving to the basket. Mitchell scored 14 points in the Liberty's narrow loss to the Detroit Shock in Game 3 of the 2008 Eastern Conference Finals.

Mitchell had a breakout year in the 2010 WNBA season. She became the regular starting point guard in the 2010 season, after the Liberty released Moore in the offseason. Mitchell averaged career-high 9.3 points and 3.8 assists per game. She scored 10-plus points 14 times, and lead the league in three-point field-goal percentage (48.6). Mitchell scored her first 20-point game against the Tulsa Shock. She won the 2010 WNBA Most Improved Player Award. On 2 September 2011, Mitchell scored a career-high 24 points in a win against the Minnesota Lynx.

On 21 April 2014, Mitchell announced that she was taking the 2014 WNBA season off to spend time with her family in Australia. As a result, on 7 August, the Liberty waived Mitchell. On 4 February 2015, Mitchell signed with the Phoenix Mercury. On 12 June, versus the Indiana Fever, Mitchell scored then career-high 25 points, going 8–14 from the floor including 7–10 from three-point range. On 5 July, Mitchell hit the go ahead three-point shot in overtime with 3.9 seconds, in a 94–91 win over the Los Angeles Sparks. On 27 August, she scored 16 points and made a three-pointer from the top of the key at the horn to give Phoenix an 81–80 win over the Connecticut Sun. In 2016, Mitchell signed with the Washington Mystics in the second half of the season to fill a roster gap at the point guard position. She played 10 games off the bench and averaged 5.9 ppg. In 2017, Mitchell returned to the Phoenix Mercury in free agency.

On 23 May 2019, the Phoenix Mercury also waived Mitchell. After releasing Arica Carter and the standard 10 waiting period after Mitchell cleared all waiver, the Mercury resigned Mitchell on 5 June. On 28 June, Mitchell recorded her first career double double as she had 18 points and then career high 11 assists. On 30 July, against the Washington Mystics, she scored then career-high 28 points and tied a WNBA-record 8 threes in a single game. Against her former team the New York Liberty, Mitchell scored her career-high 29 points on 27 August. Mitchell ended the 2019 season averaging double figure points for the first time in her career as the Mercury finished 15–19 with the 8th seed in the league. The Mercury lost 105–76 to the Chicago Sky in the first round elimination game. Mitchell won the WNBA Most Improved Player Award, becoming the first player in either the NBA or WNBA to win the award twice.

In February 2020, Mitchell signed with the Mystics in free agency. On 4 September, Mitchell recorded her second career double double as she had 20 points and career high 12 assists. She scored playoff career-high 25 points in the Mystics' loss to her former team Phoenix Mercury in the first round, losing the single elimination game 85–84.

== Career statistics ==
Legend
GP	Games played	GS	Games started	MPG	Minutes per game	RPG	Rebounds per game
APG	Assists per game	SPG	Steals per game	BPG	Blocks per game	PPG	Points per game
TO	Turnovers per game	FG%	Field-goal percentage	3P%	3-point field-goal percentage	FT%	Free-throw percentage
**Bold**	Career best	°	League leader

=== College ===
Legend
GP	Games played	GS	Games started	MPG	Minutes per game
FG%	Field goal percentage	3P%	3-point field goal percentage	FT%	Free throw percentage
RPG	Rebounds per game	APG	Assists per game	SPG	Steals per game
BPG	Blocks per game	PPG	Points per game	**Bold**	Career high

Year	Team	GP	Points	FG%	3P%	FT%	RPG	APG	SPG	BPG	PPG
2003-04	Idaho	28	438	**47.5**	**40.4**	86.1	4.5	6.0	3.2	**0.3**	15.6
2004-05	Idaho	30	531	**47.5**	39.0	**87.5**	4.6	5.9	3.9	0.1	**17.7**
2005-06	Idaho	29	510	43.9	38.0	78.3	**4.9**	5.6	**4.0**	0.2	17.6
2006-07	Utah	Did not play – transfer									
2007-08	Utah	**32**	**536**	47.2	38.4	80.1	4.1	**7.5**	2.0	0.1	16.8
Career		119	2015	46.4	38.8	83.3	4.5	6.3	3.2	0.2	16.9

=== WNBA ===
==== Regular season ====
Year	Team	GP	GS	MPG	FG%	3P%	FT%	RPG	APG	SPG	BPG	TO	PPG
2008	New York	**34**	5	15.2	.371	.404	.810	1.7	2.9	0.5	0.1	1.1	3.9
2009	New York	**34**	2	14.3	.300	.269	**1.000**	1.2	2.2	0.3	0.1	**0.7**	2.4
2010	New York	**34**	**34**	28.8	**.441**	**.486**°	.814	2.6	3.8	**1.6**	**0.2**	1.5	9.3
2011	New York	**34**	30	25.4	.375	.364	.800	2.1	2.9	1.3	0.1	1.2	5.6
2012	New York	**34**	25	26.7	.409	.411	.750	2.5	3.0	1.0	**0.2**	1.5	6.5
2013	New York	**34**	9	18.6	.406	.376	.857	2.1	1.9	0.8	0.1	1.0	5.0
2015	Phoenix	**34**	26	23.0	.374	.394	.889	2.1	2.7	1.0	0.1	1.4	6.7
2016	Washington	10	0	16.1	.435	.355	.800	1.7	1.9	0.1	0.0	1.3	5.9
2017	Phoenix	34	7	21.3	.389	.360	.824	2.4	3.6	0.9	**0.3**	1.7	8.0
2018	Phoenix	31	0	14.9	.351	.341	.857	1.4	2.3	0.5	0.2	1.3	4.4
2019	Phoenix	32	27	30.4	.441	.430	.829	**3.0**	4.0	0.9	0.3	1.8	**12.8**
2020	Washington	22	22	**30.6**	.408	.305	.872	2.8	**5.4**	0.8	0.1	1.7	9.5
2021	Washington	31	12	23.4	.360	.357	.826	2.0	2.5	0.5	0.1	1.1	6.4
Career	13 years, 4 teams	398	199	22.2	.395	.385	.834	2.1	3.0	0.8	0.1	1.3	6.6

==== Postseason ====
Year	Team	GP	GS	MPG	FG%	3P%	FT%	RPG	APG	SPG	BPG	TO	PPG
2008	New York	6	0	10.3	.429	.500	**1.000**	0.3	1.3	0.0	0.0	1.0	4.8
2010	New York	5	**5**	29.0	.227	.250	**1.000**	**3.2**	3.6	0.8	0.0	2.0	3.2
2011	New York	3	3	26.0	.353	.357	.000	1.7	1.7	0.3	0.3	1.0	5.7
2012	New York	2	0	15.5	.250	.200	.000	1.5	0.5	0.0	0.0	1.5	2.5
2015	Phoenix	4	0	14.8	.429	.500	.500	1.8	3.5	**1.5**	0.2	**0.2**	4.0
2017	Phoenix	5	5	33.0	.467	.480	.955	2.8	3.8	1.2	**0.4**	3.2	15.0
2018	Phoenix	**7**	0	7.0	.429	.000	.000	0.3	0.9	0.0	0.0	0.4	1.7
2019	Phoenix	1	1	26.9	.143	.250	**1.000**	2.0	3.0	0.0	0.0	3.0	5.0
2020	Washington	1	1	**36.0**	**.533**	**.714**	.800	2.0	**4.0**	0.0	0.0	3.0	**25.0**
Career	9 years, 3 teams	34	15	19.2	.393	.391	.923	1.6	2.3	0.5	0.2	1.4	5.9

== International basketball ==
During the WNBA off-season, Mitchell has played for ASPTT Arras in the Ligue Féminine de Basketball (LFB), a French professional league. For the 2009–10 season, Mitchell won the Import Player of the Year Award and was named to the LFB 1st Team. In 2012–2013, Mitchell played for the ŽKK Novi Zagreb in the Croatian League. Since 2013, Mitchell has been playing for the WNBL where she has played with multiple teams and was a national champion with Southside Flyers in 2020, Canberra Capitals in 2019 and Sydney Uni Flames in 2017. Mitchell was chosen as MVP of the Grand Final, as she had been in 2017, as well as voted team MVP of the season when she and the Southside Flyers won the national championship in 2020 with Mitchell scoring thirty-one points. Mitchell planned to start a coaching career with Australian NBL1 team Maitland Mustangs after finishing the 2021-22 WNBL season with the Bendigo Spirit but that playing role came to an end after four games due to pregnancy.

Mitchell has been a regular member of the Australian national team, the 'Opals', since 2014, when won a bronze medal in the 2014 World Championship. She was a member of the Australian senior team at the 2016 Summer Olympics, where Australia fell in the quarterfinals.

Mitchell, like all the other members of the 2020 Tokyo Olympics Opals women's basketball team, had a difficult tournament. The Opals lost their first two group stage matches. They looked flat against Belgium and then lost to China in heartbreaking circumstances. In their last group match the Opals needed to beat Puerto Rico by 25 or more in their final match to progress. This they did by 27 in a very exciting match. However, they lost to the United States in their quarterfinal 79 to 55.

=== WNBL (Australia) statistics ===
Season	Team	G	GS	PTS	FGA	FGM	FG%	3PA	3PM	3P%	FTA	FTM	FT%	OFF	DEF	REB	AST	STL	BLK	TO	PPG	RPG	APG
2021–22	Bendigo Spirit	4	4	23	24	8	33.3	14	3	21.4	4	4	100	1	5	6	15	6	0	10	5.8	1.5	3.8

== See also ==
- List of Australian WNBA players
