= Kelsey Bone =

American basketball player (born 1991)

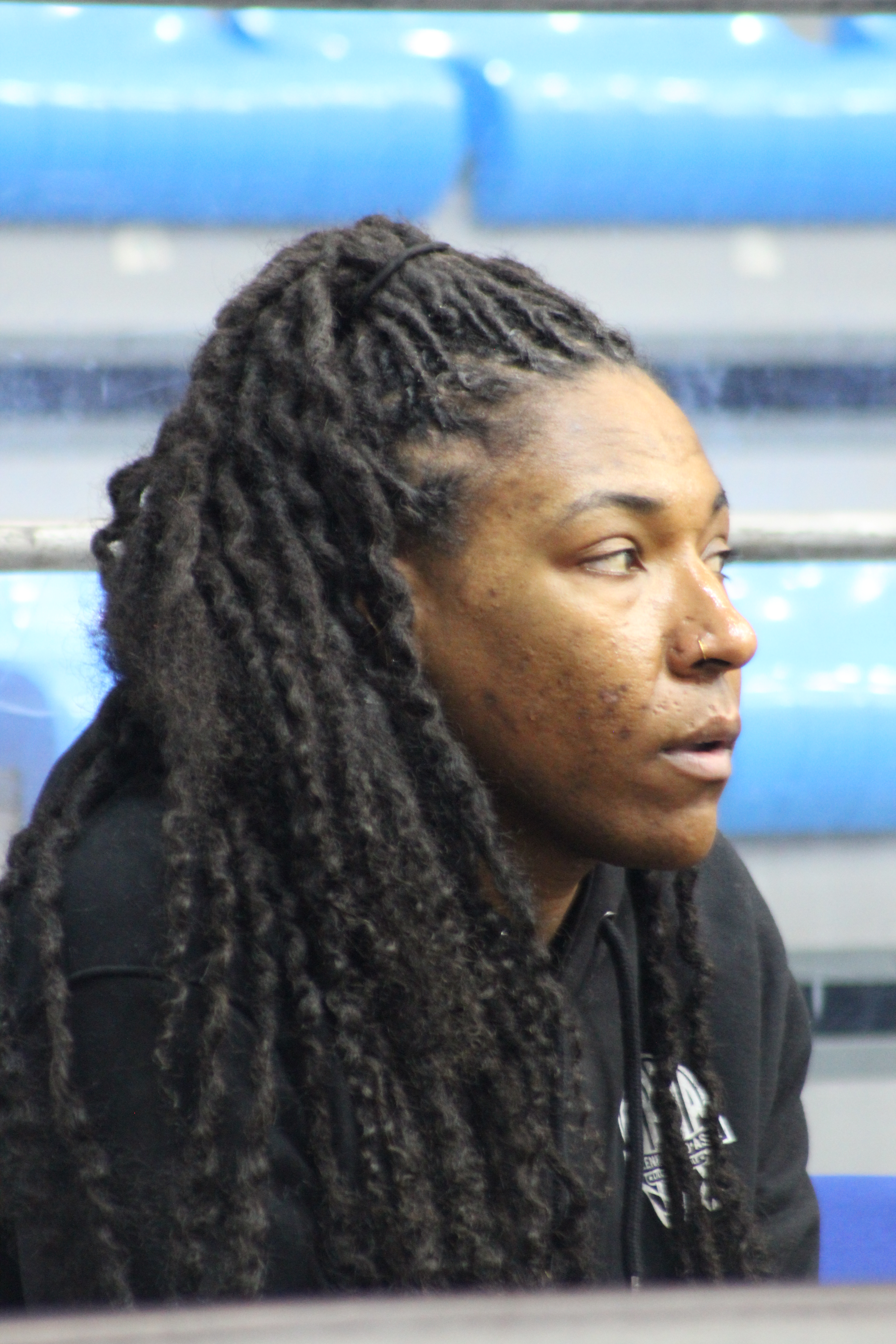

No. 3 – Nesibe Aydın
- Position: Center
- League: KBSL

Personal information
- Born: December 31, 1991 (age 34) Houston, Texas, U.S.
- Listed height: 6 ft 4 in (1.93 m)
- Listed weight: 215 lb (98 kg)

Career information
- High school: Dulles (Sugar Land, Texas)
- College: South Carolina (2009–2010); Texas A&M (2011–2013)
- WNBA draft: 2013: 1st round, 5th overall pick
- Drafted by: New York Liberty
- Playing career: 2013–2018

Career history
- 2013: New York Liberty
- 2013–2015: Galatasaray
- 2014–2016: Connecticut Sun
- 2015–2016: Girne Üniversitesi
- 2016: Phoenix Mercury
- 2016–2017: Liaoning Eagles
- 2017–2018: Napoli
- 2018: Las Vegas Aces
- 2018: Polkowice
- 2018–2019: Çukurova Basketbol
- 2019–2020: Fujian Nanan
- 2021–2022: Elitzur Holon
- 2022: Atenienses
- 2022–2023: Hapoel Petah Tikva
- 2023–2024: Antalya
- 2024–2025: Villeneuve d'Ascq
- 2025–present: Nesibe Aydın

Career highlights
- WNBA All-Star (2015); WNBA Most Improved Player (2015); WNBA All-Rookie Team (2013); Third-team All-American – AP (2013); All-American – USBWA (2013); SEC Tournament MVP (2013); First-team All-SEC (2013); SEC Freshman of the Year (2010); SEC All-Freshman (2010); Morgan Wootten Player of the Year (2009); McDonald's All-American (2009)
- Stats at WNBA.com
- Stats at Basketball Reference
Medals
Representing United States
FIBA Under-19 World Cup
Gold medal – first place	2009 Thailand	Team
FIBA Under-18 Americas Championship
Gold medal – first place	2008 Argentina	Team

Kelsey Renée Bone (born December 31, 1991) is an American professional basketball player who is currently a free agent.

== College statistics ==
Legend
GP	Games played	GS	Games started	MPG	Minutes per game
FG%	Field goal percentage	3P%	3-point field goal percentage	FT%	Free throw percentage
RPG	Rebounds per game	APG	Assists per game	SPG	Steals per game
BPG	Blocks per game	PPG	Points per game	**Bold**	Career high

Year	Team	GP	Points	FG%	3P%	FT%	RPG	APG	SPG	BPG	PPG
2009-10	South Carolina	29	406	44.7%	25.0%	**66.4%**	9.2	1.0	0.9	0.7	14.0
2010-11	Texas A&M	Redshirt									
2011-12	Texas A&M	**35**	417	52.0%	0.0%	59.6%	6.9	1.3	**1.1**	**0.7**	11.9
2012-13	Texas A&M	**35**	**582**	**56.6%**	**100.0%**	64.1%	**9.3**	**2.2**	0.8	0.5	**16.6**
Career		99	1077	51.4%	40.0%	63.6%	8.4	1.5	0.9	0.6	10.9

== USA Basketball ==
Bone was selected to play in the USA Women's Youth Development Festival. Eligible players are female basketball players who are in their sophomore or junior in high school. The 2007 event took place at the US Olympic Training Center in Colorado Springs, CO.

Bone was a member of the USA Women's U18 team which won the gold medal at the FIBA Americas Championship in Buenos Aires, Argentina. The event was held in July 2008, when the USA team defeated host Argentina to win the championship. Bone helped the team win all five games, starting all five games and scoring over ten points per game.

Bone continued on to the USA Women's U19 team which represented the US in the 2009 U19 World's Championship, held in Bangkok, Thailand in July and August 2009. Although the USA team lost the opening game to Spain, they went on to win their next seven games to earn a rematch against Spain in the finals, and won the game 81–71 to earn the gold medal. Bone started all nine games and was the team's second highest scorer, with 12.3 points per game.

== WNBA career statistics ==
Legend
GP	Games played	GS	Games started	MPG	Minutes per game	RPG	Rebounds per game
APG	Assists per game	SPG	Steals per game	BPG	Blocks per game	PPG	Points per game
TO	Turnovers per game	FG%	Field-goal percentage	3P%	3-point field-goal percentage	FT%	Free-throw percentage
**Bold**	Career best	°	League leader

=== Regular season ===
Year	Team	GP	GS	MPG	FG%	3P%	FT%	RPG	APG	SPG	BPG	TO	PPG
2013	New York	**34**°	2	19.5	.460	.000	.632	5.4	0.7	0.4	0.4	1.5	6.9
2014	Connecticut	**34**°	26	23.3	.451	.000	.662	5.3	1.4	0.6	0.5	2.0	9.3
2015	Connecticut	**34**	**33**	**28.3**	**.508**	.000	.622	**6.1**	**1.9**	**0.8**	**0.6**	2.3	**15.0**
2016	Connecticut	14°	13	23.9	.433	**.267**	.667	5.4	1.3	0.7	0.2	1.9	10.7
2016	Phoenix	20°	0	9.7	.388	.000	**.700**	2.5	0.6	0.2	0.1	1.3	3.0
2018	Las Vegas	32	10	10.8	.500	–	.500	2.2	1.2	0.1	0.1	**0.9**	2.8
Career		168	84	19.6	.470	.167	.634	4.6	1.2	0.5	0.3	1.6	8.1

=== Playoffs ===
Year	Team	GP	GS	MPG	FG%	3P%	FT%	RPG	APG	SPG	BPG	TO	PPG
2016	Phoenix	2	0	4.0	1.000	–	–	0.5	0.0	0.0	0.0	0.0	2.0

== Personal life ==
Bone's younger half-brother, Donovan Williams, plays basketball at UNLV.

On September 1, 2024, Bone married to Michigan State Spartans women's basketball assistant coach Bianca Smith.
