= Kara Braxton =

American basketball player (1983–2026)

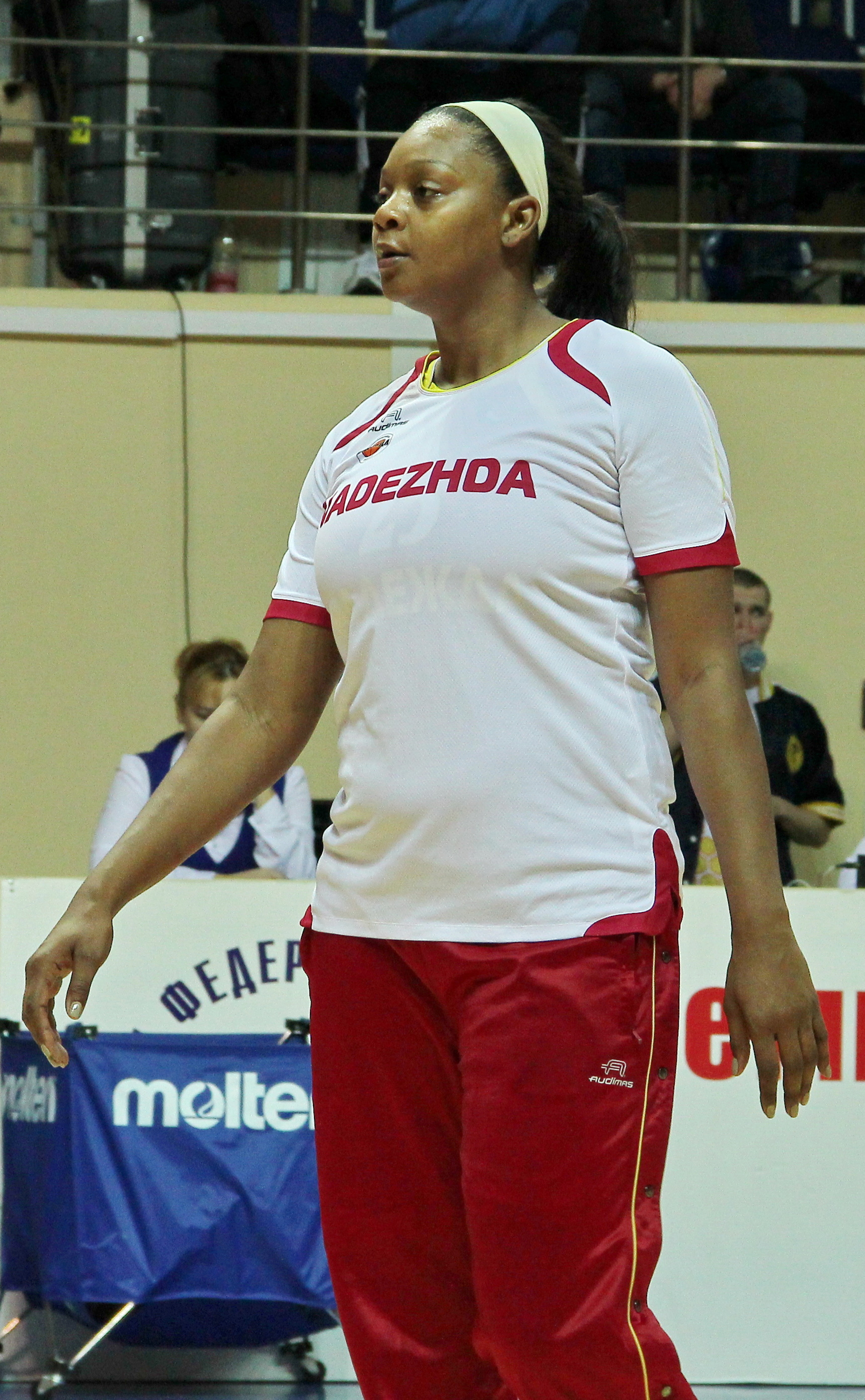
- Braxton in 2013

Personal information
- Born: February 18, 1983 Jackson, Michigan, U.S.
- Died: February 21, 2026 (aged 43) Atlanta, Georgia, U.S.
- Listed height: 6 ft 6 in (1.98 m)
- Listed weight: 225 lb (102 kg)

Career information
- High school: Westview (Beaverton, Oregon)
- College: Georgia (2002–2005)
- WNBA draft: 2005: 1st round, 7th overall pick
- Drafted by: Detroit Shock
- Playing career: 2005–2014
- Positions: Power forward, center

Career history
- 2005–2008: Detroit Shock
- 2010: Tulsa Shock
- 2010–2011: Phoenix Mercury
- 2011–2014: New York Liberty

Career highlights
- WNBA All-Star (2007); 2× WNBA champion (2006, 2008); WNBA All-Rookie Team (2005); First-team All-SEC (2002); SEC Freshman of the Year (2002); SEC All-Freshman Team (2002)
- Stats at WNBA.com
- Stats at Basketball Reference

Kara Liana Braxton (February 18, 1983 – February 21, 2026) was an American professional basketball player who played in the Women's National Basketball Association (WNBA) from 2005 until 2014 and won two championships.

== Early life ==
Kara Braxton and her twin sister, Kim, grew up in a household with two other siblings in Jackson, Michigan. Her father also played basketball. She played her freshman season at Jackson High School and then moved to Oregon. She and her twin sister later enrolled at Westview High School in Portland, OR that is part of the Beaverton School District.

Braxton attended the University of Georgia, and was freshman of the year. She was frequently late to practice and committed other unspecified violations of team rules, and after three suspensions during the 2002–03 season, on February 20, 2004, coach Andy Landers dismissed Braxton from the team. She graduated in 2005.

== Professional career ==
=== WNBA ===
On April 16, 2005, the Shock drafted Braxton in the first round as the seventh overall pick in the annual WNBA draft. She had given birth to a son, Jelani, in January 2005. Jelani's father is Cincinnati Bengals linebacker Odell Thurman.

Braxton was named to the WNBA's All-Rookie team in 2005 after averaging 6.9 points and 3.0 rebounds as a key reserve for the Shock. In 2006, she averaged fewer minutes and points than in her rookie season, but helped the Shock win the WNBA title that year.

In 2007, Braxton became Detroit's starting center after the Shock traded Ruth Riley to the San Antonio Stars. She averaged 6.0 ppg. Near the end of the 2007 regular season, the WNBA suspended Braxton for two games after she pled guilty to driving under the influence of alcohol. She was also suspended for the first six games of the 2009 season for a second DUI.

On May 28, 2014, the Liberty waived Braxton.

== Career statistics ==
Legend
GP	Games played	GS	Games started	MPG	Minutes per game	RPG	Rebounds per game
APG	Assists per game	SPG	Steals per game	BPG	Blocks per game	PPG	Points per game
TO	Turnovers per game	FG%	Field-goal percentage	3P%	3-point field-goal percentage	FT%	Free-throw percentage
**Bold**	Career best	°	League leader

†	Denotes season(s) in which Braxton won a WNBA championship

=== WNBA ===
==== Regular season ====
WNBA regular season statistics
Year	Team	GP	GS	MPG	FG%	3P%	FT%	RPG	APG	SPG	BPG	TO	PPG
2005	Detroit	33	2	13.8	46.2	0.0	55.0	3.0	0.4	0.5	0.4	1.6	6.9
2006	Detroit	**34**	1	10.6	40.6	0.0	62.5	3.4	0.8	0.3	0.3	1.6	4.3
2007	Detroit	31	20	17.6	44.7	—	67.2	5.4	0.5	0.5	0.5	2.0	6.7
2008	Detroit	33	10	17.9	41.5	0.0	74.3	5.1	0.8	0.4	0.7	1.6	8.9
2009	Detroit	28	2	18.0	52.7	—	64.5	6.0	**1.5**	0.7	0.6	1.8	9.0
2010	Tulsa	22	16	16.8	50.0	25.0	63.9	4.6	1.3	**1.1**	**0.8**	3.0	9.3
2010	Phoenix	13	0	17.2	54.4	—	71.1	4.8	1.2	0.6	0.4	2.1	**11.1**
2011	Phoenix	18	18	19.8	**55.9**	**50.0**	59.5	4.9	1.3	0.8	**0.8**	1.8	10.6
2011	New York	13	0	12.8	39.7	33.3	40.0	3.0	0.8	0.4	0.5	1.5	3.9
2012	New York	34	18	15.7	48.1	20.0	45.0	4.5	1.1	0.5	0.6	2.2	6.6
2013	New York	34	**33**	**21.8**	48.1	—	66.1	**6.6**	1.2	0.6	0.4	2.3	8.7
2014	New York	4	0	7.8	50.0	—	**100.0**	1.0	0.8	0.3	0.3	**1.0**	2.5
**Career**	12 years, 3 teams	297	120	16.4	47.5	28.0	64.1	4.7	0.9	0.6	0.5	1.9	7.6
**Career**	All-Star	1	1	12.3	28.6	—	—	4.0	0.0	0.0	0.0	1.0	4.0

==== Playoffs ====
WNBA playoff statistics
Year	Team	GP	GS	MPG	FG%	3P%	FT%	RPG	APG	SPG	BPG	TO	PPG
2005	Detroit	2	0	18.0	27.8	—	83.3	3.5	1.0	0.0	0.0	1.5	7.5
2006^{†}	Detroit	10	0	12.3	42.3	—	54.5	2.8	0.6	0.8	0.4	1.8	5.0
2007	Detroit	**11**	0	15.5	46.9	0.0	70.8	5.5	0.5	0.3	0.7	1.8	7.0
2008^{†}	Detroit	9	**9**	**20.0**	50.0	—	65.0	5.3	1.0	0.4	0.6	1.9	8.6
2009	Detroit	5	0	19.2	54.1	—	57.1	**6.8**	1.4	0.8	**1.4**	2.4	**9.6**
2010	Phoenix	4	0	13.3	**59.3**	**100.0**	42.9	2.5	0.8	0.3	0.3	1.8	9.0
2011	New York	3	0	16.0	50.0	0.0	**100.0**	4.3	**1.7**	0.3	0.3	1.7	5.0
2012	New York	2	2	17.5	43.8	0.0	0.0	3.5	0.0	**2.0**	0.0	**0.5**	7.0
**Career**	8 years, 3 teams	46	11	16.1	47.6	25.0	63.9	4.5	0.8	0.5	0.6	1.8	7.2

=== College ===
NCAA statistics
Year	Team	GP	Points	FG%	3P%	FT%	RPG	APG	SPG	BPG	PPG
2001–02	Georgia	**30**	**489**	54.0	14.3	62.6	6.8	2.3	**1.8**	2.0	**16.3**
2002–03	Georgia	21	330	**55.1**	**28.6**	**73.2**	7.3	**2.5**	1.4	**2.0**	15.7
2003–04	Georgia	20	274	47.8	16.7	64.8	**8.0**	1.2	1.4	1.3	13.7
**Career**		71	1582	52.6	20.0	65.9	7.3	2.0	1.6	1.8	15.4

== European career ==
- 2005–2006: (Poland) TS Wisla Can-Pack Krakow (champion)
- 2006–2007: (Turkey) Beşiktaş Cola Turka
- 2007–2008: (Poland) TS Wisla Can-Pack Krakow (champion)
- 2008–2009: (Turkey) Galatasaray
- 2009–2010: (China) Liaoning Hengye (MVP, champion)
- 2010–2011: (China) Liaoning Hengye
- 2011–2012: (Turkey) Optimum TED
- 2012–2013: (Russia) Nadezhda Orenburg

== Statistics ==
- A two-time Class 4A player of the year.

== Personal life and death ==
Braxton is the mother of The University of North Carolina at Chapel Hill football tight end Jelani Thurman.

Braxton was killed in a traffic collision in Atlanta, Georgia, on February 21, 2026, at the age of 43. She is survived by her husband, Jarvis Jackson, and her two sons.
