= Waltiea Rolle =

Bahamian basketball player (born 1990)

Personal information
- Born: September 11, 1990 (age 36) Nassau, Bahamas
- Listed height: 6 ft 6 in (1.98 m)
- Listed weight: 199 lb (90 kg)

Career information
- High school: Westbury Christian (Houston, Texas)
- College: North Carolina (2009–2013)
- WNBA draft: 2013: 3rd round, 36th overall pick
- Drafted by: Minnesota Lynx
- Position: Center
- Number: 3

Career history
- 2014: Seattle Storm

Career highlights
- 2× ACC All-Defensive Team (2011, 2013)
- Stats at Basketball Reference

Waltiea Maxcine Rolle (born September 11, 1990) is a Bahamian former professional basketball center who played for the Seattle Storm of the Women's National Basketball Association (WNBA). She played college basketball for the North Carolina Tar Heels.

== Early life ==
Waltiea Maxcine Rolle was born on September 11, 1990, in Nassau, The Bahamas. After being noticed by Olympic track and field medalist Frank Rutherford while walking home from school, she moved to the United States at the age of 13 to join the Houston, Texas–based Frank Rutherford Elite Athlete Development program. She attended Westbury Christian School in Houston. She earned first-team TAPPS all-state and District 4-5A Player of the Year honors her junior year. Rolle was named a WBCA All-American, a Parade second-team All-American, and an ESPNRISE.com second-team All-American her senior season. She was rated the No. 28 overall prospect in the country by ESPN Hoop Gurlz and the No. 21 prospect by the All-Star Girls Report. She was rated the No. 9 center by ESPN Hoop Gurlz.

== College career ==
Rolle played college basketball for the North Carolina Tar Heels from 2009 to 2013. She played in 30 games, starting 15, during her freshman year in 2009–10, averaging 6.8 points, 4.5 rebounds and leading the Atlantic Coast Conference (ACC) with 2.4 blocks per game. She appeared in 37 games, starting nine, in 2010–11, averaging 7.2 points, 4.6 rebounds and an ACC-leading 2.2 blocks per game, earning All-ACC Defensive Team honors. She also led the ACC in total blocks that season with 82.

Rolle missed the first 10 games of the 2011–12 season due to childbirth. She played in 20 games that season, averaging 3.7 points, 1.9 rebounds and 1.0 blocks per game. She appeared in 35 games, starting 32, during her senior year in 2012–13, averaging 12.1 points, 6.6 rebounds, 1.1 steals, and 2.5 blocks per game, garnering All-ACC Defensive Team recognition. Rolle finished her college career with the eighth-most blocks in ACC history with 262.

== Professional career ==
Rolle was selected by the Minnesota Lynx in the third round, with the 36th overall pick, in the 2013 WNBA draft, becoming the first Bahamian to be drafted into the WNBA. She decided not to sign with the Lynx in 2013 to instead play overseas and also complete her college degree. On April 8, 2014, she officially signed with the Lynx. At the time of her signing, she had been playing for Haskovo of the Women's Bulgaria League, and averaging a league-best 23.7 points per game. Rolle averaged 7.0 points, 4.3 rebounds and 1.0 steals per game in three preseason games for the Lynx. Rolle was waived on May 16, 2014, before the start of the 2014 season.

She signed with the Seattle Storm on July 21, 2014. She appeared in six games for the Storm during the 2014 WNBA season, averaging 2.7 points and 3.2 rebounds per game. Rolle was the first Bahamian to play in the WNBA. She was waived on May 19, 2015.

Rolle also played professionally overseas, with stops in Bulgaria, China, Czech Republic, Turkey, and Spain.

== Post-playing career ==
In November 2023, Rolle became a girls' basketball coach and teacher at Noble Preparatory Academy in The Bahamas.

== Personal life ==
As of April 2018, Rolle was working towards a degree in exercise science-sports administration at the University of North Carolina.
