= Alex Montgomery =

American basketball player (born 1988)

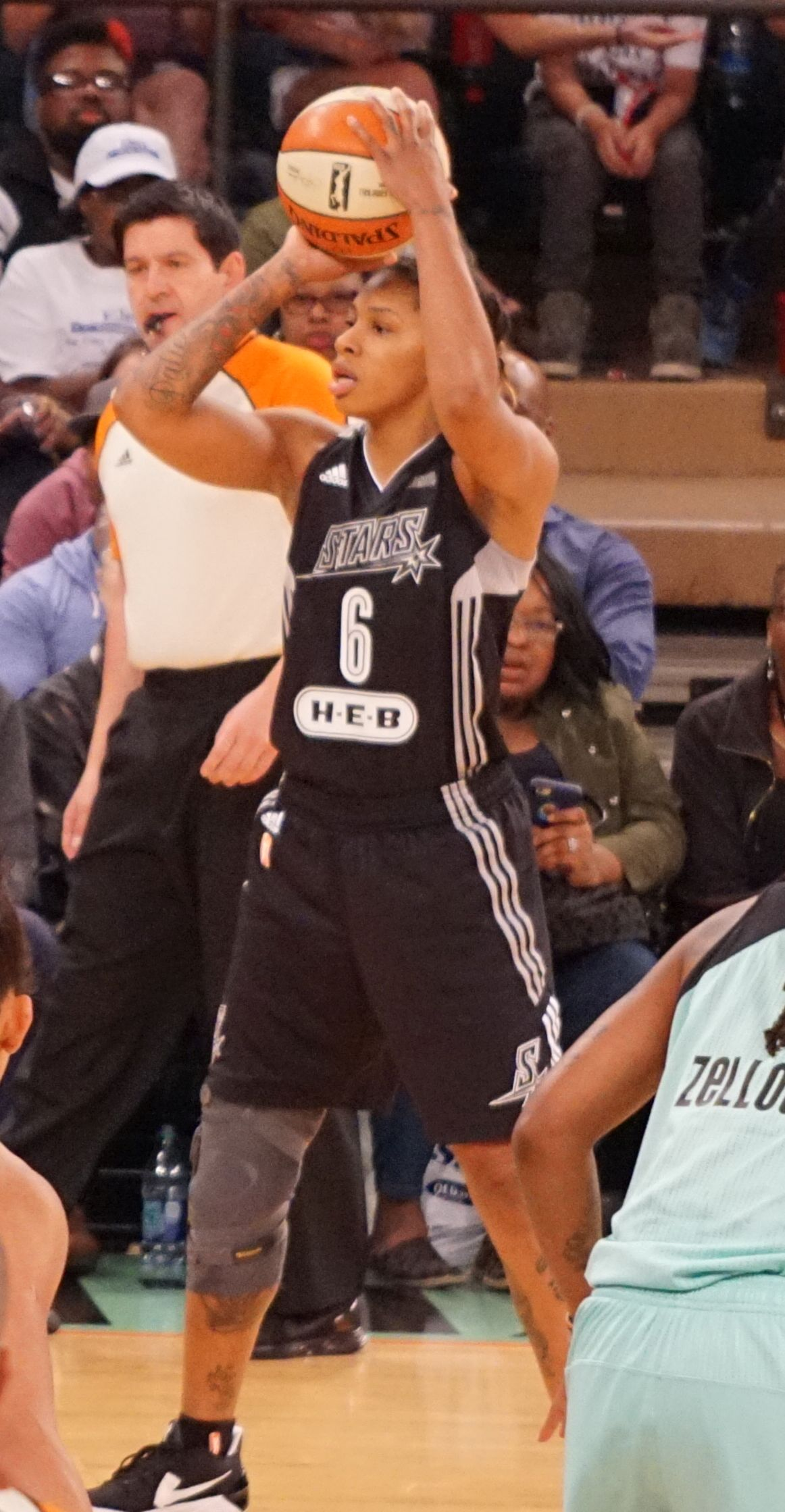

Personal information
- Born: November 12, 1988 (age 38) Tacoma, Washington, U.S.
- Listed height: 6 ft 1 in (1.85 m)
- Listed weight: 185 lb (84 kg)

Career information
- High school: Lincoln (Tacoma, Washington)
- College: Georgia Tech (2007–2011)
- WNBA draft: 2011: 1st round, 10th overall pick
- Drafted by: New York Liberty
- Playing career: 2011–2018
- Position: Guard / forward

Career history
- 2011–2014: New York Liberty
- 2015–2017: San Antonio Stars
- 2018: Chicago Sky

Career highlights
- ACC All-Defensive Team (2011); ACC Sixth Player of the Year (2010); ACC All-Freshman Team (2008)
- Stats at WNBA.com
- Stats at Basketball Reference

Alexandria Rochell Montgomery (born November 12, 1988) is an American former basketball player who last played for the Chicago Sky of the Women's National Basketball Association (WNBA).

== Early life and education ==
During her senior season at Lincoln High School in 2007, Montgomery averaged 22.3 points, 18.8 rebounds, 8.0 assists and 6.4 blocks per game. She had seven quadruple-doubles and even a rare quintuple-double in a win over Central Kitsap, finishing with 27 points, 22 rebounds, 10 assists, 10 blocks and 10 steals.

== Professional career ==
=== WNBA ===
Montgomery was selected the first round of the 2011 WNBA draft (10th overall) by the New York Liberty.

On April 16, 2015 Montgomery was traded to the San Antonio Stars in exchange for the ninth-overall pick of the 2015 WNBA draft.

On February 23, 2018 Montgomery was signed by the Chicago Sky after her contract with San Antonio expired.

=== LBF ===
From October 2012 to April 2013, Montgomery played for Sport Club do Recife, the biggest club in the Northeast of Brazil. Montgomery played a key role in the team from Recife, helping lead them to a championship.

== Career statistics ==
Legend
GP	Games played	GS	Games started	MPG	Minutes per game	RPG	Rebounds per game
APG	Assists per game	SPG	Steals per game	BPG	Blocks per game	PPG	Points per game
TO	Turnovers per game	FG%	Field-goal percentage	3P%	3-point field-goal percentage	FT%	Free-throw percentage
**Bold**	Career best	°	League leader

=== WNBA ===
==== Regular season ====
WNBA regular season statistics
Year	Team	GP	GS	MPG	FG%	3P%	FT%	RPG	APG	SPG	BPG	TO	PPG
2011	New York	30	0	9.0	32.9	**44.4**	64.7	1.8	0.7	0.3	0.2	0.6	2.5
2012	New York	26	0	8.1	37.5	34.8	72.7	1.8	0.4	0.6	0.1	0.5	2.5
2013	New York	**34**	0	23.0	38.4	30.2	84.6	5.2	1.7	0.6	0.2	1.7	**6.1**
2014	New York	**34**	20	21.9	**40.9**	43.1	68.8	3.9	1.0	**0.7**	0.2	1.1	5.3
2015	San Antonio	14	3	16.7	37.7	20.0	70.0	4.1	0.7	0.6	**0.5**	1.1	4.9
2016	San Antonio	25	7	14.3	35.7	31.3	75.0	2.1	1.6	0.4	0.2	0.8	3.6
2017	San Antonio	**34**	**31**	**23.5**	37.0	30.7	82.6	**5.7**	**2.1**	0.6	0.3	1.4	6.0
2018	Chicago	19	0	6.4	26.3	33.3	**100.0**	0.9	0.5	0.1	0.1	**0.3**	0.8
**Career**	8 years, 3 teams	216	61	16.3	37.4	34.1	76.5	3.4	1.2	0.5	0.2	1.0	4.2

==== Playoffs ====
WNBA playoff statistics
Year	Team	GP	GS	MPG	FG%	3P%	FT%	RPG	APG	SPG	BPG	TO	PPG
2011	New York	2	0	4.0	**33.3**	0.0	—	0.0	0.0	0.0	**0.5**	0.5	1.0
2012	New York	2	0	**11.0**	28.6	**25.0**	**75.0**	**3.0**	0.0	**1.0**	0.0	**0.0**	**4.0**
**Career**	2 years, 1 team	4	0	7.5	30.0	20.0	75.0	1.5	0.0	0.5	0.3	0.3	2.5

=== College ===
NCAA statistics
Year	Team	GP	Points	FG%	3P%	FT%	RPG	APG	SPG	BPG	PPG
2007–08	Georgia Tech	31	335	**42.7**	33.7	73.8	5.4	2.1	1.7	**0.8**	10.8
2008–09	Georgia Tech	30	410	38.4	**36.0**	76.3	6.7	1.9	**2.5**	0.7	13.7
2009–10	Georgia Tech	28	333	36.8	32.4	78.0	6.0	1.9	0.9	0.1	11.9
2010–11	Georgia Tech	**35**	**487**	40.2	35.4	**80.2**	**8.6**	**2.3**	2.1	0.2	**13.9**
**Career**		124	1565	39.5	34.5	77.4	6.8	2.1	1.8	0.5	12.6
