= Anna Prins =

American basketball player

Anna Prins De Hamer
Personal information
- Born: January 27, 1991 (age 35) Mesa, Arizona, U.S.
- Listed height: 6 ft 7 in (2.01 m)

Career information
- High school: Broomfield (Broomfield, Colorado)
- College: Iowa State (2009–2013)
- WNBA draft: 2013: 2nd round, 23rd overall pick
- Drafted by: Connecticut Sun
- Position: Center
- Stats at Basketball Reference

Adrianna Louise "Anna" Prins (born January 27, 1991) is an American professional basketball player who was the 23rd pick in the 2013 WNBA draft.

== College ==
Prins was the fourth highest WNBA draft pick in Iowa State women's basketball history.

== Iowa State statistics ==
Legend
GP	Games played	GS	Games started	MPG	Minutes per game
FG%	Field goal percentage	3P%	3-point field goal percentage	FT%	Free throw percentage
RPG	Rebounds per game	APG	Assists per game	SPG	Steals per game
BPG	Blocks per game	PPG	Points per game	**Bold**	Career high

Year	Team	GP	Points	FG%	3P%	FT%	RPG	APG	SPG	BPG	PPG
2009–10	Iowa State	**33**	–	48.9	-	62.7	7.2	0.7	0.6	**0.4**	8.8
2010–11	Iowa State	**33**	283	**51.0**	–	65.4	7.5	1.1	0.6	0.2	8.6
2011–12	Iowa State	30	**425**	49.8	16.7	71.3	**10.6**	1.1	**1.2**	0.2	**14.2**
2012–13	Iowa State	30	401	50.4	**30.4**	**83.7**	9.7	**1.8**	1.0	0.3	13.4
Career	Iowa State	126	1109	50.0	23.5	71.1	8.7	1.1	0.8	0.3	8.8
