= Toni Young =

American basketball player (born 1991)

Personal information
- Born: January 11, 1991 (age 35) Del City, Oklahoma, U.S.
- Listed height: 6 ft 1 in (1.85 m)
- Listed weight: 160 lb (73 kg)

Career information
- High school: Del City (Del City, Oklahoma)
- College: Oklahoma State (2009–2013)
- WNBA draft: 2013: 1st round, 7th overall pick
- Drafted by: New York Liberty
- Playing career: 2013–present
- Position: Forward

Career history
- 2013–2014: New York Liberty

Career highlights
- First-team All-Big 12 (2013)
- Stats at WNBA.com
- Stats at Basketball Reference

Toni Young (born January 11, 1991) is an American professional basketball player who last played for the New York Liberty of the WNBA.

== College ==
While Young was in college she was motivated by her head coach Kurt Budke and assistant coach Miranda Serna of Oklahoma State Cowgirls basketball team Young's first two years. They would tell Young that if she uses all of her potential she can make it into the WNBA.

== Career statistics ==
=== WNBA ===
Legend
GP	Games played	GS	Games started	MPG	Minutes per game	RPG	Rebounds per game
APG	Assists per game	SPG	Steals per game	BPG	Blocks per game	PPG	Points per game
TO	Turnovers per game	FG%	Field-goal percentage	3P%	3-point field-goal percentage	FT%	Free-throw percentage
**Bold**	Career best	°	League leader

==== Regular season ====
Year	Team	GP	GS	MPG	FG%	3P%	FT%	RPG	APG	SPG	BPG	TO	PPG
2013	New York	**31**	**10**	**11.1**	**47.5**	0.0	**66.7**	**1.9**	**0.5**	**0.3**	0.3	0.8	**4.1**
2014	New York	8	0	4.8	30.0	0.0	60.0	0.8	0.1	0.1	0.3	**0.0**	1.1
Career	2 years, 1 team	39	10	9.8	46.2	0.0	65.2	1.6	0.4	0.3	0.3	0.7	3.5

=== College ===
Legend
GP	Games played	GS	Games started	MPG	Minutes per game
FG%	Field goal percentage	3P%	3-point field goal percentage	FT%	Free throw percentage
RPG	Rebounds per game	APG	Assists per game	SPG	Steals per game
BPG	Blocks per game	PPG	Points per game	**Bold**	Career high

Year	Team	GP	Points	FG%	3P%	FT%	RPG	APG	SPG	BPG	PPG
2009-10	Oklahoma State	**35**	246	**52.1**	-	**62.5**	6.3	0.4	0.6	0.7	7.0
2010-11	Oklahoma State	31	479	47.1	-	57.8	9.1	**1.0**	**1.7**	1.6	15.5
2011-12	Oklahoma State	33	395	51.4	-	59.1	7.0	0.4	1.0	1.0	12.0
2012-13	Oklahoma State	33	**529**	51.4	-	59.5	**10.1**	0.7	1.6	**1.9**	**16.0**
Career	Oklahoma State	132	1649	50.1	0.0	59.6	8.1	0.6	1.2	1.3	12.5

== WNBA ==
Young was selected seventh by the New York Liberty in the 2013 WNBA draft. She became the second women's player from Oklahoma State to get picked in an WNBA draft.

On March 2, 2015 Young signed with the San Antonio Stars.
