= Kamiko Williams =

American basketball player (born 1991)

Personal information
- Born: April 6, 1991 (age 35) Fayetteville, North Carolina, U.S.
- Listed height: 5 ft 11 in (1.80 m)
- Listed weight: 160 lb (73 kg)

Career information
- High school: Kaiserslautern, Germany (2005–2006); Northeast, Clarksville, TN, (2006–2009)
- College: Tennessee (2009–2013)
- WNBA draft: 2013: 2nd round, 15th overall pick
- Drafted by: New York Liberty
- Playing career: 2013–2014
- Position: Guard

Career history
- 2013: New York Liberty
- Stats at WNBA.com
- Stats at Basketball Reference
- Stats at Basketball Reference

Kamiko Williams (born April 6, 1991) is an American basketball coach and a former professional basketball player who last played for the New York Liberty of the Women's National Basketball Association (WNBA).

Williams was a former standout player under legendary coach Pat Summitt at the University of Tennessee and was a second-round draft pick in the 2013 WNBA draft.

== High school career ==
Williams was raised as a Military dependent as her father, Vincent Williams, served in the United States Army. As a freshman, she starred for Kaiserslautern High School in Germany, which was part of the Department of Defense Dependents Schools (DoDDS) system for the children of United States Armed Forces personnel and Civil Servants overseas. Williams finished her freshman year at Kaiserslautern averaging 14.7 points per game and 10.8 rebounds per game, earning her a 2006 First Team All-Europe selection and was the only freshman to do so. The selection committee notably dubbed Williams as "Europe's Best Player." Williams completed her high school career at Northeast High School in Clarksville, Tennessee as her father had a Permanent change of station to Fort Campbell in nearby Kentucky.

== College career ==
As a player at Tennessee from 2010–13, Williams honed her skills and competitive mentality under the guidance of legendary coach Pat Summitt, helping the Lady Vols to three NCAA Elite Eight appearances and one Sweet Sixteen appearance. During her time in Knoxville, the team had a combined record of 120-23. Williams played in 128 games for the storied program, winning two Regular Season Southeastern Conference (SEC) Championships and three SEC Tournament Championships.

== Professional career ==
Williams was then drafted 15th overall in the 2013 WNBA Draft by the New York Liberty and coach Bill Laimbeer. In one season with the Liberty, she averaged 2.6 points and 2.1 rebounds per game. During a team practice Williams tore a knee ligament, causing her to miss the entire 2014 WNBA season.

== Coaching career ==
Williams started her coaching career (2015–18) at the University of New Haven where she assisted in recruiting, academics, strength and conditioning, community outreach, basketball camps and fundraising. The Chargers advanced to the Northeast-10 Conference semifinals during the 2015-16 season.

Williams spent three seasons (2018–21) in the same role at Monmouth University. During the 2019-20 season, she helped lead Monmouth to its seventh consecutive Metro Atlantic Athletic Conference (MAAC) Tournament Quarterfinals appearance. The Hawks ended the season 35th in the nation in scoring defense, allowing just 57.5 points per game.

Under Williams’ guidance senior Sierra Green led the team in scoring at 11.1 points per game and knocked down 71 3-pointers to move into third-all-time with 169. Senior Rosa Graham ended the season 10th in program history with 271 assists. During the 2018–19 season, Williams helped lead the Hawks to their highest-ever MAAC finish and advanced to the semifinals of the tournament for the second time in six seasons. During her time at Monmouth, she coached several players that earned All-MAAC honors.

Williams spent the 2021-22 season as an assistant coach and recruiting coordinator at Nicholls State University in Thibodaux, Louisiana. She coached All-Southland Conference player Chyna Allen at Nicholls.

Williams spent the 2022-23 season as an assistant coach at Weber State University (WSU).

== Career statistics ==
Legend
GP	Games played	GS	Games started	MPG	Minutes per game	RPG	Rebounds per game
APG	Assists per game	SPG	Steals per game	BPG	Blocks per game	PPG	Points per game
TO	Turnovers per game	FG%	Field-goal percentage	3P%	3-point field-goal percentage	FT%	Free-throw percentage
**Bold**	Career best	°	League leader

=== WNBA ===
==== Regular season ====
Year	Team	GP	GS	MPG	FG%	3P%	FT%	RPG	APG	SPG	BPG	TO	PPG
2013	New York	34	18	13.3	32.2	26.1	57.1	2.1	0.9	0.7	0.2	0.9	2.6
Career	1 year, 1 team	34	18	13.3	32.2	26.1	57.1	2.1	0.9	0.7	0.2	0.9	2.6

=== College ===
Legend
GP	Games played	GS	Games started	MPG	Minutes per game
FG%	Field goal percentage	3P%	3-point field goal percentage	FT%	Free throw percentage
RPG	Rebounds per game	APG	Assists per game	SPG	Steals per game
BPG	Blocks per game	PPG	Points per game	**Bold**	Career high

Year	Team	GP	Points	FG%	3P%	FT%	RPG	APG	SPG	BPG	PPG
2009–10	Tennessee	34	137	42.3	33.3	74.1	1.9	1.6	0.7	0.5	4.0
2010–11	Tennessee	**37**	251	46.5	**36.0**	70.0	3.2	1.6	0.8	**0.6**	6.8
2011–12	Tennessee	22	62	41.3	-	**90.9**	1.8	1.3	0.5	0.4	2.8
2012–13	Tennessee	35	**258**	**50.5**	32.6	70.0	**4.2**	**2.5**	**1.6**	0.3	**7.4**
Career	Tennessee	128	708	46.5	30.9	73.1	2.9	1.8	0.9	0.5	5.5

== Personal life ==
Williams graduated from Tennessee in three years with a Bachelor of Arts in Sociology/Criminal Justice. She is currently pursuing a master’s degree from Southern New Hampshire University.
