= 2013 WNBA draft =

General information
- Sport: Basketball
- Date: April 15, 2013
- Location: Bristol, Connecticut
- Networks: ESPN2, ESPNU

Overview
- League: WNBA
- First selection: Brittney Griner; Phoenix Mercury

The 2013 WNBA draft is the league's annual process for determining which teams receive the rights to negotiate with players entering the league. The draft was held on April 15, 2013, at the ESPN studios in Bristol, Connecticut at 8:00 pm EDT. The first round was shown on ESPN2 (HD), with the second and third rounds shown on ESPNU.

== Draft lottery ==
The lottery selection to determine the order of the top four picks in the 2013 draft occurred on September 26, 2012. For the first time in league history, the lottery was televised (during SportsCenter at 6:30 pm ET).

Below were the chances for each team to get specific picks in the 2013 draft lottery, rounded to three decimal places:

Team	2012 record	Lottery chances	Pick			
Team	2012 record	Lottery chances	1st	2nd	3rd	4th
Washington Mystics	5–29	442	.442	.316	.181	.062
Phoenix Mercury	7–27	276	.276	.310	.270	.144
Tulsa Shock	9–25	178	.178	.230	.317	.275
Chicago Sky	14–20	104	.104	.145	.232	.520
Shaded block denotes actual lottery result.

== Transactions ==
- February 2, 2012: The Minnesota Lynx signed-and-traded Alexis Hornbuckle to the Phoenix Mercury in exchange for a 2013 second round draft pick.
- March 14, 2012: The Chicago Sky acquired Sonja Petrovic from the San Antonio Silver Stars in exchange for a 2013 second round draft pick.
- February 19, 2013: The Washington Mystics receive the seventh and 19th overall pick from the Atlanta Dream as part of the Jasmine Thomas trade. Atlanta receives the 13th overall pick.
- February 27, 2013: The New York Liberty receive the seventh overall pick from the Washington Mystics as part of the Kia Vaughn trade. Washington receives the 17th overall pick.
- March 1, 2013: The New York Liberty receive the 15th and 27th overall picks as part of a three-team trade. The Tulsa Shock receive the 29th overall pick.
- April 15, 2013: The New York Liberty receive the 25th overall pick from the Washington Mystics as part of the Quanitra Hollingsworth trade.

== Draft invitees ==
The WNBA announced on April 11, 2013, the 12 players were invited to attend the draft.

- (United States) Alex Bentley, Penn State
- (United States) Kelsey Bone, Texas A&M
- (United States) Layshia Clarendon, California
- (United States) Elena Delle Donne, Delaware
- (United States) Skylar Diggins, Notre Dame
- (United States) Kelly Faris, Connecticut
- (United States) Brittney Griner, Baylor
- (United States) Tianna Hawkins, Maryland
- (United States) Tayler Hill, Ohio State
- (United States) Lindsey Moore, Nebraska
- (United States) Ta’Shauna “Sugar” Rodgers, Georgetown
- (United States) Toni Young, Oklahoma State

== Key ==
!	Denotes player who has been inducted to the Naismith Basketball Hall of Fame
^	Denotes player who has been inducted to the Women's Basketball Hall of Fame
*	Denotes player who has been selected for at least one All-Star Game and All-WNBA Team
^{+}	Denotes player who has been selected for at least one All-Star Game
^{#}	Denotes player who never played in the WNBA regular season or playoffs
**Bold**	Denotes player who won Rookie of the Year

== Draft ==
=== Round 1 ===
Pick	Player	Nationality (Note: Nationality indicates the player's national team or representative nationality at time of draft. If a player has not competed at the international level, then the nationality indicates the national team which the player is eligible to represent according to FIBA rules.)	Team	School / club team
1	Brittney Griner *	United States	Phoenix Mercury	Baylor (Sr.)
2	**Elena Delle Donne** !	United States	Chicago Sky	Delaware (Sr.)
3	Skylar Diggins *	United States	Tulsa Shock	Notre Dame (Sr.)
4	Tayler Hill	United States	Washington Mystics	Ohio State (Sr.)
5	Kelsey Bone ^{+}	United States	New York Liberty	Texas A&M (Jr.)
6	Tianna Hawkins	United States	Seattle Storm	Maryland (Sr.)
7	Toni Young	United States	New York Liberty (from Atlanta via Washington)	Oklahoma State (Sr.)
8	Kayla Alexander	Canada	San Antonio Silver Stars	Syracuse (Sr.)
9	Layshia Clarendon ^{+}	United States	Indiana Fever	California (Sr.)
10	A'dia Mathies	United States	Los Angeles Sparks	Kentucky (Sr.)
11	Kelly Faris	United States	Connecticut Sun	Connecticut (Sr.)
12	Lindsey Moore	United States	Minnesota Lynx	Nebraska (Sr.)

=== Round 2 ===
Pick	Player	Nationality	Team	School / club team
13	Alex Bentley ^{+}	United States	Atlanta Dream (from Washington)	Penn State (Sr.)
14	Sugar Rodgers ^{+}	United States	Minnesota Lynx (from Phoenix)	Georgetown (Sr.)
15	Kamiko Williams	United States	New York Liberty (from Tulsa)	Tennessee (Sr.)
16	Davellyn Whyte	United States	San Antonio Silver Stars (from Chicago)	Arizona (Sr.)
17	Nadirah McKenith	United States	Washington Mystics (from New York)	St. John's (Sr.)
18	Chelsea Poppens	United States	Seattle Storm	Iowa State (Sr.)
19	Emma Meesseman ^{+}	Belgium	Washington Mystics (from Atlanta)	Villeneuve-d'Ascq (France)
20	Diandra Tchatchouang ^{#}	France	San Antonio Silver Stars	Perpignan (France)
21	Jasmine Hassell	United States	Indiana Fever	Georgia (Sr.)
22	Brittany Chambers ^{#}	United States	Los Angeles Sparks	Kansas State (Sr.)
23	Anna Prins ^{#}	United States	Connecticut Sun	Iowa State (Sr.)
24	Chucky Jeffery	United States	Minnesota Lynx	Colorado (Sr.)

=== Round 3 ===
Pick	Player	Nationality	Team	School / club team
25	Shenneika Smith ^{#}	Jamaica	New York Liberty (from Washington)	St. John's (Sr.)
26	Nikki Greene	United States	Phoenix Mercury	Penn State (Sr.)
27	Olcay Çakır ^{#}	Turkey	New York Liberty (from Tulsa)	Fenerbahçe (Turkey)
28	Brooklyn Pope ^{#}	United States	Chicago Sky	Baylor (Sr.)
29	Angel Goodrich	United States	Tulsa Shock (from New York)	Kansas (Sr.)
30	Jasmine James	United States	Seattle Storm	Georgia (Sr.)
31	Anne Marie Armstrong	United States	Atlanta Dream	Georgia (Sr.)
32	Whitney Hand ^{#}	United States	San Antonio Silver Stars	Oklahoma (Sr.)
33	Jennifer George ^{#}	United States	Indiana Fever	Florida (Sr.)
34	Alina Iagupova (Note: Los Angeles's selection of Alina Iagupova was subsequently voided by the league due to her age, under Article XIII, section 1(d) of the Collective Bargaining Agreement.)	Ukraine	Los Angeles Sparks	Elizabeth-Basket Kivorograd (Ukraine)
35	Andrea Smith ^{#}	United States	Connecticut Sun	South Florida (Sr.)
36	Waltiea Rolle	Bahamas	Minnesota Lynx	North Carolina (Sr.)

== Notable undrafted players ==
These players were not selected in the 2013 draft but have played at least one game in the WNBA.

Player	Position	Nationality	School/club team
Victoria Macaulay	C	Australia	Temple (Sr.)
Tierra Ruffin-Pratt	G	United States	North Carolina (Sr.)

== See also ==
- List of first overall WNBA draft picks
