= Ta'Shia Phillips =

American basketball player (born 1989)

Personal information
- Born: January 24, 1989 (age 37) Indianapolis, Indiana, U.S.
- Listed height: 6 ft 6 in (1.98 m)
- Listed weight: 198 lb (90 kg)

Career information
- High school: Brebeuf Prep (Indianapolis, Indiana)
- College: Xavier (2007–2011)
- WNBA draft: 2011: 1st round, 8th overall pick
- Drafted by: Atlanta Dream
- Playing career: 2011–2018
- Position: Center

Career history
- 2011: Washington Mystics
- 2011: New York Liberty

Career highlights
- Third-team All-American – AP (2011); 2× A-10 Defensive Player of the Year (2010, 2011); A-10 Player of the Year (2009); 3× First-team All-A-10 (2009–2011); 3× A-10 All-Defensive Team (2009–2011); A-10 Freshman of the Year (2008); A-10 All-Freshman Team (2008); McDonald's All-American (2007); Indiana Miss Basketball (2007)
- Stats at WNBA.com
- Stats at Basketball Reference
Medals
Women's basketball
Representing United States
World University Games
| Gold medal – first place | 2009 Belgrade | Team |

Ta'Shia Phillips (born January 24, 1989) is an American former professional basketball player who most recently played for the New York Liberty of the Women's National Basketball Association.

== USA Basketball ==
Phillips was named a member of the team representing the US at the 2009 World University Games held in Belgrade, Serbia. The team won all seven games to earn the gold medal. Phillips averaged 4.9 points per game.

== Professional career ==
Phillips was selected the first round of the 2011 WNBA draft (8th overall) by the Atlanta Dream.

== Coaching career ==
In 2018 Phillips was hired as an assistant coach at the University of Indianapolis.

== Career statistics ==
Legend
| GP | Games played | GS | Games started | MPG | Minutes per game | RPG | Rebounds per game |
| APG | Assists per game | SPG | Steals per game | BPG | Blocks per game | PPG | Points per game |
| TO | Turnovers per game | FG% | Field-goal percentage | 3P% | 3-point field-goal percentage | FT% | Free-throw percentage |
| **Bold** | Career best | ° | League leader |

=== WNBA ===
WNBA regular season statistics
| Year | Team | GP | GS | MPG | FG% | 3P% | FT% | RPG | APG | SPG | BPG | TO | PPG |
|---|---|---|---|---|---|---|---|---|---|---|---|---|---|
| 2011 | Washington | **10** | 0 | **5.4** | **53.8** | — | 50.0 | **1.6** | 0.0 | 0.0 | **0.3** | 0.3 | **1.9** |
| 2011 | New York | 5 | 0 | 3.6 | 50.0 | — | 50.0 | 0.6 | **0.2** | 0.0 | 0.0 | **0.0** | 0.6 |
| **Career** | 1 year, 2 teams | 15 | 0 | 4.8 | 53.3 | — | 50.0 | 1.3 | 0.1 | 0.0 | 0.2 | 0.2 | 1.5 |

=== College ===
NCAA statistics
| Year | Team | GP | Points | FG% | 3P% | FT% | RPG | APG | SPG | BPG | PPG |
|---|---|---|---|---|---|---|---|---|---|---|---|
| 2007–08 | Xavier | 33 | 463 | 59.4 | – | 52.7 | 11.2 | 1.1 | 0.6 | 1.1 | 14.0 |
| 2008–09 | Xavier | 32 | 445 | 61.3 | – | 55.8 | 12.1 | **1.2** | **0.7** | 1.7 | 13.9 |
| 2009–10 | Xavier | **34** | 472 | **62.1** | – | 60.7 | 11.7 | 1.1 | 0.6 | **2.0** | 13.9 |
| 2010–11 | Xavier | 32 | **515** | 60.5 | – | **62.4** | **12.4** | 0.8 | 0.6 | 1.6 | **16.1** |
| **Career** | | 131 | 1895 | 60.8 | 0.0 | 57.9 | 11.8 | 1.1 | 0.6 | 1.6 | 14.5 |
