= Essence Carson =

American basketball player (born 1986)

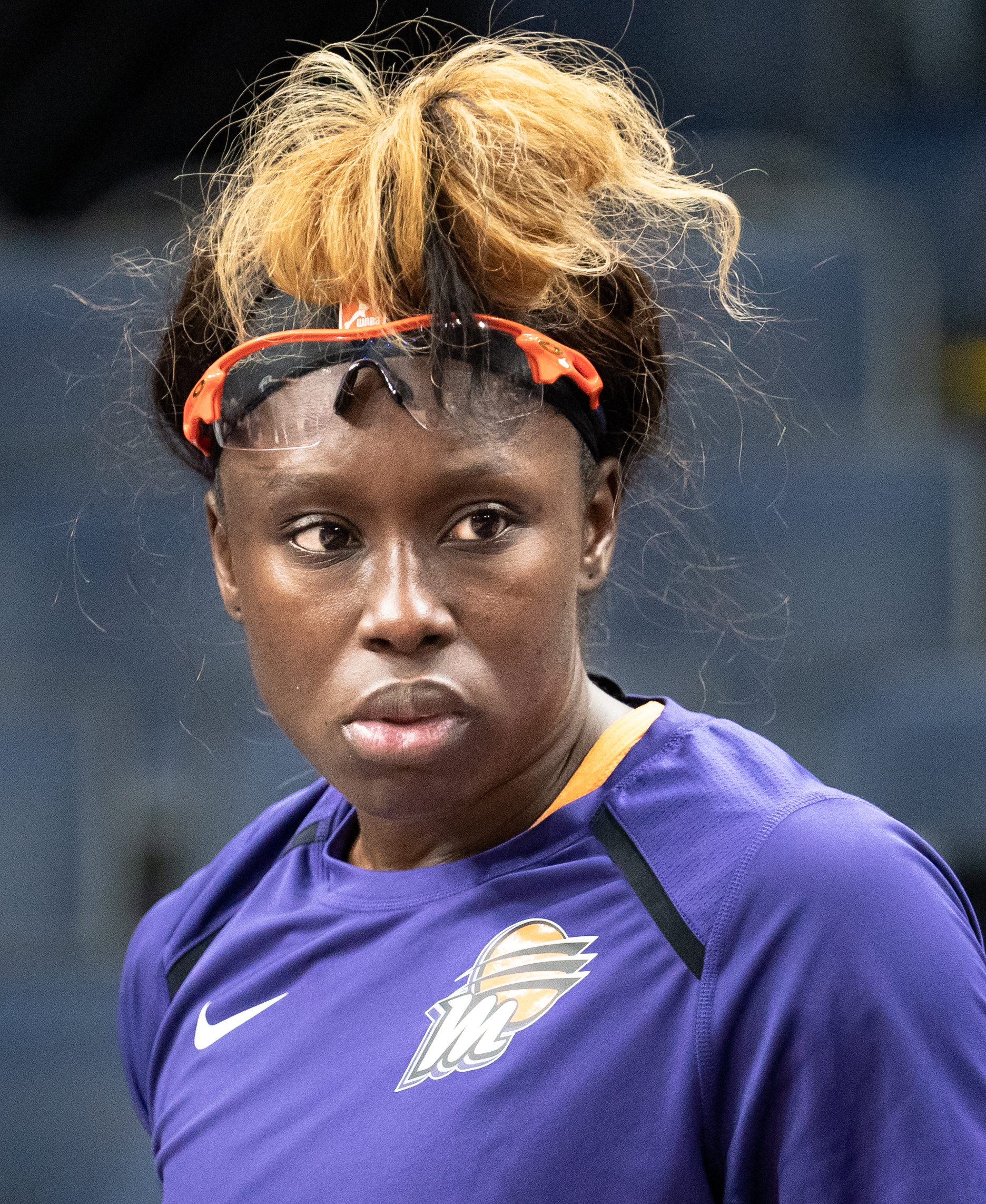
- Carson with the Phoenix Mercury in 2019

Personal information
- Born: July 28, 1986 (age 40) Paterson, New Jersey, U.S.
- Listed height: 6 ft 0 in (1.83 m)
- Listed weight: 163 lb (74 kg)

Career information
- High school: Eastside (Paterson, New Jersey)
- College: Rutgers (2004–2008)
- WNBA draft: 2008: 1st round, 7th overall pick
- Drafted by: New York Liberty
- Playing career: 2008–2020
- Position: Shooting guard

Career history
- 2008–2015: New York Liberty
- 2008–2009: Venezia
- 2009–2010: CJM Bourges Basket
- 2010–2011: CMB Cargo UNI Gyor
- 2011–2012: CJM Bourges Basket
- 2012–2013: Rivas Ecopolis
- 2013: Istanbul University
- 2015–2016: Samsun Canik Belediyesi
- 2016–2018: Los Angeles Sparks
- 2016–2017: Yakin Dogu
- 2019: Phoenix Mercury
- 2020: Washington Mystics
- 2020: Connecticut Sun

Career highlights
- WNBA champion (2016); WNBA All-Star (2011); French National League champion (2012); French Cup winner (2010); EuroLeague runner up (2012); Queen's Cup winner (2013); Turkish Cup winner (2017); Turkish League champion (2017); EuroCup winner (2017); First-team All-Big East (2007); 3× Big East Defensive Player of the Year (2006–2008); McDonald's All American (2004)
- Stats at WNBA.com
- Stats at Basketball Reference
Medals
Women's basketball
Representing the United States
U18 U19 U20 U21
Gold medal – first place	2006 U20 Mexico	Team competition
Gold medal – first place	2007 U21 Russia	Team competition
FIBA Under-19 World Cup
Gold medal – first place	2005 Tunisia	Team
FIBA Under-18 Americas Championship
Gold medal – first place	2004 Puerto Rico	Team

Essence Carson (born July 28, 1986) is an American former professional basketball player. She played college basketball for Rutgers University. After a successful college career there, Carson was drafted by the New York Liberty with the 7th overall pick in the 2008 WNBA draft.

== Early life ==
Carson was born in Paterson, New Jersey and is one of three children. Carson started playing organized sports at the age of 11 and attended Rosa L. Parks School of Fine and Performing Arts while competing athletically at Eastside High School in Paterson, where she was an all-state volleyball player and state champion in the 400 meters.

Carson graduated from Rosa L. Parks School of Fine & Performing Arts and Eastside High School in 2004. She participated in the 2004 WBCA High School All-America Game, where she was a starter and scored seven points. Carson was also a McDonald's All-American where she was also a starter and scored 5 points. Upon graduation, Carson accepted a basketball scholarship at Rutgers University.

== College career ==
Carson attended and played college basketball at Rutgers University for four seasons. During her college career, Carson played shooting guard and small forward for coach Vivian Stringer as the team entered the NCAA Tournament in each of her first three seasons. Carson was a key-member of the team when they won the Big East title in her first two seasons. In her freshman season, Carson was named a Big East Academic All-Star and won Big East Defensive Player of the Year in her sophomore season. Rutgers had finished second place during Carson's junior season and advanced all the way to the NCAA Championship Game after a 54–53 win over top-seeded Duke. They would end up losing to Tennessee in the final championship game. In her junior season, Carson won Big East Defensive Player of the Year for the second time and was named to the All-Big East First Team, the Big East All-Tournament Team, and to the Kodak All-American Regional Team. During her final season at Rutgers, Carson was the Big East Defensive Player of The Year for a third time making her only the second player in history to achieve such a feat. Following her senior season, Carson entered the 2008 WNBA draft.

=== College statistics ===
Year	Team	GP	FG%	3P%	FT%	RPG	APG	PPG
2004-05	Rutgers	23	.414	.320	.700	8.3	1.3	10.1
2005-06	Rutgers	32	.385	.286	.786	4.2	2.6	8.3
2006-07	Rutgers	35	.402	.327	.799	6.3	2.9	12.3
2007-08	Rutgers	31	.422	.337	.734	5.2	2.6	10.8
Career	Rutgers	121	.405	.328	.768	5.8	2.4	10.4

== Professional career ==
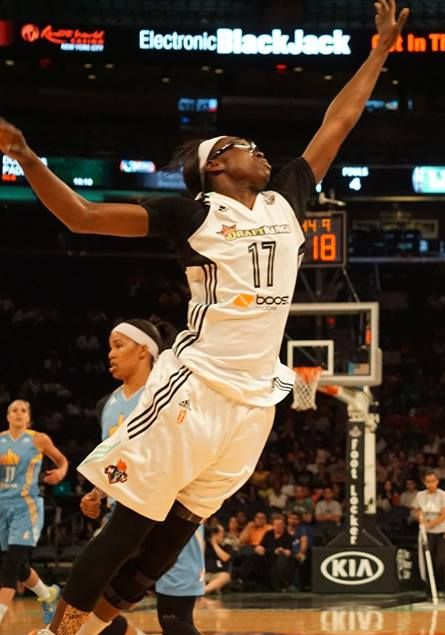
Carson during the 2015 WNBA season in a game between the Chicago Sky and the New York Liberty

=== WNBA ===
Carson was drafted 7th overall in the 2008 WNBA draft by the New York Liberty. She helped the Liberty win the first-round series of the 2008 playoffs, but the Liberty fell short in the eastern conference finals against Detroit Shock who won the championship that year. In the 2011 season, Carson was voted a WNBA All-Star for the first time in her career despite being a reserve on the Liberty's roster, she had averaged 11.3 points per game. In the 2011 WNBA All-Star Game, Carson scored 13 points for the eastern conference team.

In 2012, Carson re-signed with Liberty once her rookie contract expired. On June 9, 2013, during a regular season game against the Atlanta Dream, Carson tore the anterior cruciate ligament in her left knee and was sidelined for the rest of the season. Prior to the injury, she was averaging a team-high 17.7 points per game and 6.3 rebounds per game through the first three games. After recovering from the injury, Carson had a smaller role on the team as her minutes were reduced and was downgraded back to a reserve on the Liberty's roster for the 2014 and 2015 seasons.

On March 31, 2016, Carson signed with the Los Angeles Sparks in free agency to fill a gap in their roster left by an injured Riquna Williams who would miss the entire 2016 season. During the 2016 season, Carson became the starting shooting guard for the Sparks after playing small forward during previous seasons with the Liberty. Carson along with Candace Parker, Nneka Ogwumike and Kristi Toliver helped the Sparks to a 26–8 record and the number 2 seed in the league. Carson would eventually win her first WNBA Championship with the Sparks as they defeated the Minnesota Lynx 3–2 in the finals.

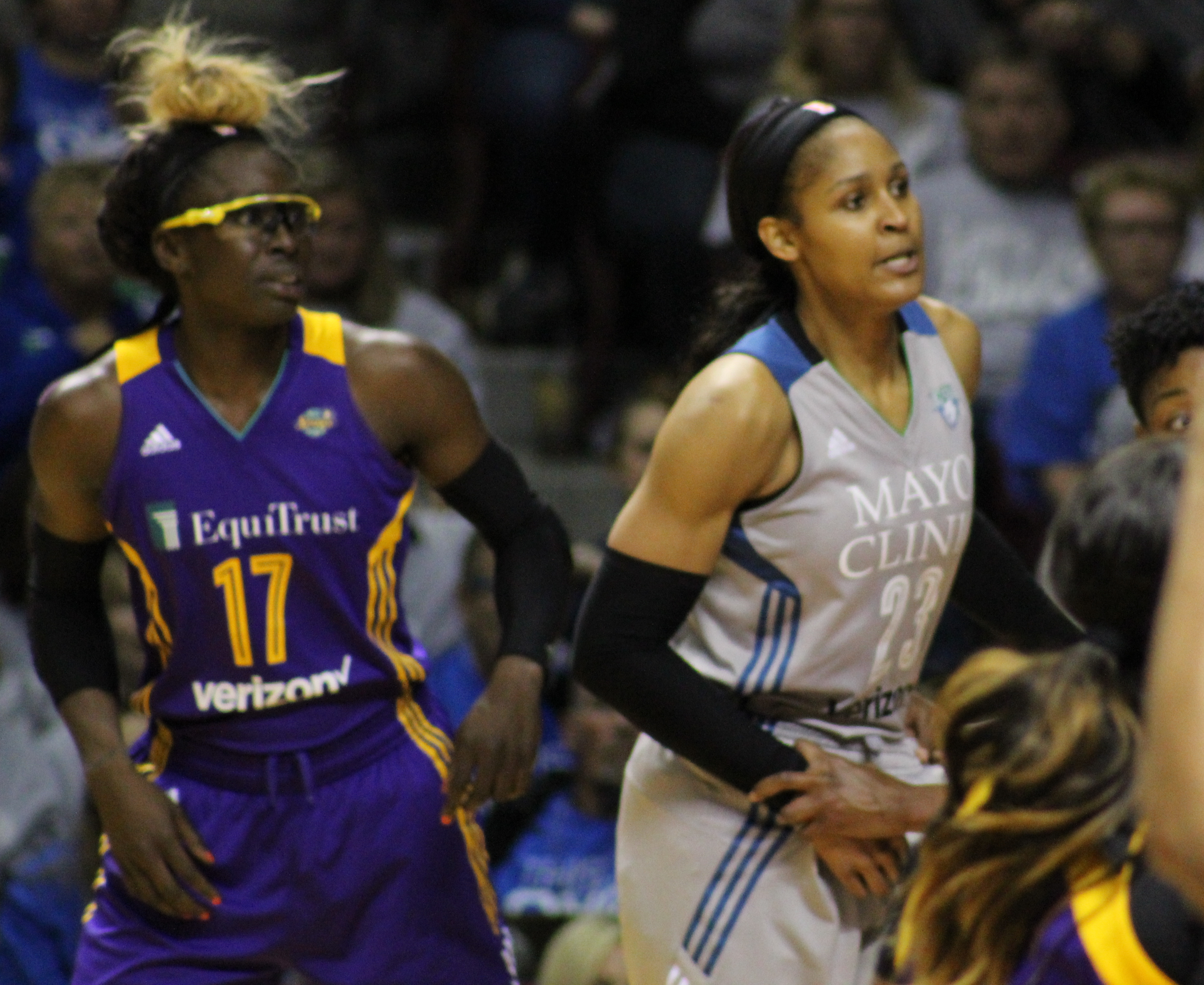
Carson, Maya Moore and Alana Beard during the 2017 WNBA Finals

In February 2017, Carson re-signed with the Sparks in free agency. During the 2017 season, Carson started during the first 10 games of the season but would then be permanently moved to the bench rotation, being replaced in the starting lineup by newly acquired combo-guard Odyssey Sims following an elbow injury. The Sparks once again finished with a 26–8 record and the number 2 seed in the league. The Sparks would once again advance all the way through to the Finals for the second season in a row, setting up a rematch with the Lynx. However, the Sparks would lose to the Lynx in 5 games, failing to win back-to-back championships.

In 2018, Carson would have a slightly increased role on the team from last season. The Sparks however were unable to be a title contender in the league, as they finished 19–15 with the number 6 seed. In the first-round elimination game, they defeated the Minnesota Lynx 75–68 to advance. In the second-round elimination game, the Sparks lost 96–64 to the Washington Mystics.

In 2019, Carson signed with the Phoenix Mercury. In the 2019 season, Carson missed 11 games while battling a calf injury. She started 13 of the 23 games played for the Mercury. The Mercury finished as the number 8 seed with a 15–19 record. The Mercury were eliminated in the first-round elimination game by the Chicago Sky by a final score of 105–76.

The following season, Carson signed with the Washington Mystics, making her debut for the team on the opening day of the season. On August 16, 2020, Carson was waived by the Mystics. On August 17, she was signed by the Connecticut Sun. The Sun finished as the number 7 seed with a 10–12 record. The season was shortened to 22 games in a bubble at IMG Academy due to the COVID-19 pandemic. In the first-round elimination game, the Sun defeated by the Chicago Sky 94–81. In the second-round elimination, the Sun pulled off an upset by defeating the 3rd seeded Los Angeles Sparks by a final score of 73–59, advancing to the semi-finals. In the semi-finals, the Sun fell short after losing to Las Vegas Aces in a hard-fought five-game series.

=== Overseas ===
In the 2008-09 off-season, Carson played in Italy for Venezia. In the 2009-10 off-season, Carson played in France for CJM Bourges Basket. In the 2010-11 off-season, Carson played in Hungary for CM Cargo UNI Gyor. In the 2011-12 off-season, Carson returned to France to play once again for CJM Bourges Basket. In the 2012-13 off-season, Carson played the first portion of the off-season in Spain for Rivas Ecopolis and spent the second portion of the off-season playing in Turkey for Istanbul University. In the 2015-16 off-season, Carson played in Turkey once again for Samsun Canik Belediyesi. As of November 2016, Carson had signed with Yakin Dogu for the 2016-17 off-season and won a championship with the team.

=== Athletes Unlimited ===
Carson appeared in Athletes Unlimited Pro Basketball in 2023, finishing 35th on the season.

== National team career ==
Carson was a member of the USA Women's U18 team which won the gold medal at the FIBA Americas Championship in Mayaguez, Puerto Rico. The event was held in August 2004, when the USA team defeated Puerto Rico to win the championship. Carson helped the team win the gold medal, scoring 8.7 points per game.

Carson continued with the team as it became the U19 team, and competed in the 2005 U19 World Championships in Tunis, Tunisia. The USA team won all eight games, winning the gold medal. Carson scored 5.6 points per game.

Carson went on to compete with USA for the FIBA Americas Under-20 Championship for Women where they won gold in 2006. In 2007, in Moscow, Russia she competed with the USA once again for the FIBA Under-21 World Championship For Women where she was once again a starter and won a gold medal.

== Philanthropy ==
In 2012, Carson partnered with Health Equity Initiative, a non-profit organization to launch an educational campaign to raise awareness of health disparities, as well as encourage community action and partnerships for health equity.

== Music ==
Other than professional basketball, Carson is also a hip-hop artist and producer under the name Pr3pE (pronounced "Preppy"). On November 12, 2013, she independently released her first album called Broken Diary. Carson also produced 70% of the album. She had released music videos for two singles off the album called "Hater" and "Love Letter". Carson also noted that her musical influences are Stevie Wonder, Ray Charles, Jay-Z, MC Lyte, Missy Elliott and J. Cole. In January 2016, Carson hinted on social media that she's working on a second album. On March 25, 2016, Carson released a mixtape called No Subz which she self-produced and wrote.

== Personal life ==
Carson has a younger brother named Shaquille Thomas, who played basketball for the University of Cincinnati Bearcats. Carson graduated with a degree in Psychology and a minor in Music from Rutgers University in 2008. Carson also plays the piano, saxophone, electric bass guitar, and drums. In 2018, Carson enrolled in the ARTium Recordings internship program. She now works for Universal/Capitol Music Group as Manager of Priority Records.

== WNBA career statistics ==
Legend
GP	Games played	GS	Games started	MPG	Minutes per game	RPG	Rebounds per game
APG	Assists per game	SPG	Steals per game	BPG	Blocks per game	PPG	Points per game
TO	Turnovers per game	FG%	Field-goal percentage	3P%	3-point field-goal percentage	FT%	Free-throw percentage
**Bold**	Career best	°	League leader

†	Denotes seasons in which Carson won a WNBA championship

=== Regular season ===
Year	Team	GP	GS	MPG	FG%	3P%	FT%	RPG	APG	SPG	BPG	TO	PPG
2008	New York	**34**	30	19.0	.376	.276	.674	2.2	0.9	0.9	0.2	1.0	6.6
2009	New York	**34**	**34**	25.3	.408	.333	.917	2.1	1.4	1.0	0.2	1.5	10.0
2010	New York	**34**	0	9.6	.407	.160	.688	1.6	0.7	0.4	0.2	0.7	3.7
2011	New York	32	5	22.7	.437	**.387**	.738	2.8	1.7	**1.1**	0.6	1.4	11.3
2012	New York	**34**	23	27.3	.400	.343	.778	3.4	1.7	1.0	**0.7**	1.7	11.6
2013	New York	4	4	**29.5**	**.550**	.333	.857	**5.5**	**1.8**	0.5	0.5	2.5	**14.3**
2014	New York	26	11	14.0	.354	.292	.833	1.7	0.9	0.3	0.1	1.0	3.3
2015	New York	33	12	19.5	.380	.245	.773	2.3	1.3	0.4	0.1	1.0	6.1
2016^{†}	Los Angeles	**34**	**34**	23.3	.449	.359	.891	2.0	1.5	1.0	0.2	1.2	8.1
2017	Los Angeles	24	14	19.3	.404	.250	.875	1.7	1.2	0.6	0.3	0.7	4.8
2018	Los Angeles	**34**	15	23.1	.435	.361	**.938**	2.6	0.9	0.8	0.3	**0.6**	7.5
2019	Phoenix	23	13	18.5	.352	.341	.784	2.2	1.5	0.5	0.3	0.7	5.8
2020*	Washington	10	0	16.8	.288	.261	.500	1.8	0.5	0.5	0.1	1.0	4.3
2020*	Connecticut	11	2	11.2	.325	.286	.750	1.5	0.6	0.4	0.1	0.5	3.2
2020	Total	21	2	13.8	.303	.273	.600	1.7	0.6	0.4	0.1	0.8	3.7
Career	13 years, 5 teams	367	197	20.1	.404	.322	.792	2.3	1.2	0.8	0.3	1.1	7.2

=== Postseason ===
Year	Team	GP	GS	MPG	FG%	3P%	FT%	RPG	APG	SPG	BPG	TO	PPG
2008	New York	6	6	16.8	.485	.167	.500	1.5	0.8	0.1	0.3	0.6	5.7
2010	New York	5	0	25.0	**.536**	**.444**	.800	3.2	0.6	0.8	**0.6**	1.8	**13.6**
2011	New York	3	0	22.0	.357	.200	.667	3.3	1.3	**2.0**	0.3	2.0	9.0
2012	New York	2	2	**28.5**	.250	.167	.000	4.0	1.0	0.5	0.5	2.0	6.5
2015	New York	6	0	14.1	.423	.333	**1.000**	1.0	0.7	0.1	0.0	0.5	4.2
2016^{†}	Los Angeles	**9**	**9**	25.2	.333	.258	.500	2.3	1.2	0.4	0.1	1.2	6.7
2017	Los Angeles	8	0	12.7	.400	.000	.714	1.1	0.4	0.6	0.2	**0.2**	3.1
2018	Los Angeles	2	0	17.9	.231	.143	.500	2.0	**2.0**	0.5	0.5	0.5	4.0
2019	Phoenix	1	0	10.7	.667	.000	.000	**5.0**	1.0	1.0	0.0	1.0	4.0
2020	Connecticut	5	0	7.8	.462	.200	.000	0.4	0.0	0.2	0.4	0.4	2.6
Career	10 years, 4 teams	47	17	18.1	.402	.235	.667	1.9	0.8	0.5	0.3	0.9	5.9
