= 2014 WNBA Finals =

Basketball championship

Team	Coach	Wins
Phoenix Mercury	Sandy Brondello	3
Chicago Sky	Pokey Chatman	0
- Dates: September 7–12
- MVP: (United States) Diana Taurasi (Phoenix)
- Hall of Famers: Sky: Elena Delle Donne (2026); Sylvia Fowles (2025)
- Eastern finals: Chicago defeated Indiana, 2–1
- Western finals: Phoenix defeated Minnesota, 2–1

The 2014 WNBA Finals was the championship series for the 2014 season of the Women's National Basketball Association (WNBA), and the conclusion of the season's playoffs. The Phoenix Mercury, champions of the Western Conference, faced the Chicago Sky, champions of the Eastern Conference.

The WNBA Finals were under a 2–2–1 rotation. The Mercury held home-court advantage as they had a better regular season record (29–5) than the Sky (15–19). The Mercury swept the Sky in three games to win their third title in franchise history.

Both teams would meet again in the 2021 WNBA Finals, but this time the Sky emerged victorious in four games.

== Background ==
=== 2014 WNBA regular season ===
#	Eastern Conference					
#	Team	W	L	PCT	GB	GP
1	y- Atlanta Dream	19	15	.559	-	34
2	x- Indiana Fever	16	18	.471	3.0	34
3	x-Washington Mystics	16	18	.471	3.0	34
4	x-Chicago Sky	15	19	.441	4.0	34
5	e-New York Liberty	15	19	.441	4.0	34
6	e-Connecticut Sun	13	21	.382	6.0	34

#	Western Conference					
#	Team	W	L	PCT	GB	GP
1	y-Phoenix Mercury	29	5	.853	-	34
2	x-Minnesota Lynx	25	9	.735	4.0	34
3	x-San Antonio Stars	16	18	.471	13.0	34
4	x-Los Angeles Sparks	16	18	.471	13.0	34
5	e-Tulsa Shock	12	22	.353	17.0	34
6	e-Seattle Storm	12	22	.353	17.0	34

=== 2014 WNBA playoffs ===
Phoenix Mercury		Chicago Sky
29–5 (.853); 1st West, 1st overall	Seeding	15–19 (.441); 4th East, 8th overall
Defeated the (4) Los Angeles Sparks, 2–0	Conference Semifinals	Defeated the (1) Atlanta Dream, 2–1
Defeated the (2) Minnesota Lynx, 2–1	Conference Finals	Defeated the (2) Indiana Fever, 2–1

=== Chicago Sky ===
The Chicago Sky finished 15–19, good for fourth place in the Eastern Conference. The Sky defeated the Atlanta Dream in three games, setting up a conference final against the Indiana Fever. Chicago lost the first game of the series, but rallied to win two straight to reach the finals for the first time in franchise history.

=== Phoenix Mercury ===
The Phoenix Mercury finished with the best record in the WNBA, finishing with a 29–5 record. The Mercury swept the fourth-seeded Los Angeles Sparks in the conference semifinals, and defeated the Minnesota Lynx in the Western Conference Finals in three games.

=== Regular-season series ===
The Phoenix Mercury won the season series 2–0:

July 2, 2014

Report

Chicago Sky 69, Phoenix Mercury 87

US Airways Center, Phoenix, AZ

July 11, 2014

Report

Phoenix Mercury 72, Chicago Sky 66

Allstate Arena, Rosemont, IL

== Series summary ==
All times are in Eastern Daylight Time (UTC−4).

=== Game 1 ===
ABC

September 7
3:30pm ET

Report

Chicago Sky 62, Phoenix Mercury 83
Scoring by quarter: 8–15, 12–27, 14–14, 28–27
Pts: Fowles (19); Rebs: Fowles (11); Asts: Vandersloot (5)	Pts: Dupree (26); Rebs: Griner (7); Asts: Taurasi (11)
Phoenix leads series, 1–0

US Airways Center, Phoenix, AZ
Attendance: 13,263
Referees:
#31 Amy Bonner
#38 Lamont Simpson
#42 Roy Gulbeyan

=== Game 2 ===
ESPN

September 9
9:00pm ET

Report

Chicago Sky 68, Phoenix Mercury 97
Scoring by quarter: 14–21, 22–30, 15–23, 17–23
Pts: Delle Donne (22); Rebs: Fowles (5); Asts: Vandersloot (4)	Pts: Griner (19); Rebs: Taylor (8); Asts: Taylor (6)
Phoenix leads series, 2–0

US Airways Center, Phoenix, AZ
Attendance: 13,348
Referees:
#4 Sue Blauch
#18 Kurt Walker
#55 Eric Brewton

=== Game 3 ===
ESPN2

September 12
8:00pm ET

Report

Phoenix Mercury 87, Chicago Sky 82
Scoring by quarter: 22–22, 23–21, 16–20, 26–19
Pts: Dupree, Taurasi (24); Rebs: Bonner (9); Asts: Dupree (6)	Pts: Delle Donne (23); Rebs: Fowles (8); Asts: Vandersloot (11)
Phoenix wins WNBA Finals, 3–0

UIC Pavilion, Chicago, IL
Attendance: 7,365
Referees:
#9 Denise Brooks
#34 Maj Forsberg
#39 Michael Price

== Rosters ==
2014 Phoenix Mercury roster
Players
Coaches

Pos.	No.	Nat.	Name	Height	Weight	DOB	From	Yrs
F	8	(United States)	Bass, Mistie	6' 3" (1.91m)	189 lb (86kg)	1983-12-02	Duke	7
G	23	(United States)	Bias, Tiffany	5' 8" (1.73m)	133 lb (60kg)	1992-05-22	Oklahoma State	5
G/F	24	(United States)	Bonner, DeWanna	6' 4" (1.93m)	143 lb (65kg)	1987-08-21	Auburn	5
F	4	(United States)	Dupree, Candice	6' 2" (1.88m)	178 lb (81kg)	1984-08-16	Temple	8
C	42	(United States)	Griner, Brittney	6' 9" (2.06m)	205 lb (93kg)	1990-10-18	Baylor	1
G	10	(Latvia)	Jēkabsone-Žogota, Anete	5' 9" (1.75m)	167 lb (76kg)	1983-08-12	Latvia	2
C	11	(Poland)	Kobryn, Ewelina	6' 4" (1.93m)	210 lb (95kg)	1982-05-07	Poland	3
G	14	(United States)	Murphy, Eshaya	5' 11" (1.8m)	164 lb (74kg)	1985-04-15	USC	7
G	31	(Australia)	Phillips, Erin	5' 8" (1.73m)	165 lb (75kg)	1985-05-19	Australia	6
G	3	(United States)	Taurasi, Diana	6' 0" (1.83m)	163 lb (74kg)	1982-06-11	Connecticut	10
F	13	(Australia)	Taylor, Penny	6' 1" (1.85m)	165 lb (75kg)	1981-05-24	Australia	12

Head coach
(Australia) Sandy Brondello (Western Sydney)
Assistant coaches
(United States) Julie Hairgrove (Arizona)
(United States) Todd Troxel (Doane)
Athletic trainer
(United States) Tamara Poole (Cal State Dominguez Hills)

Legend

- (C) Team captain
- (DP) Unsigned draft pick
- (FA) Free agent
- (S) Suspended
- Injured

2014 Chicago Sky roster
Players
Coaches

Pos.	No.	Nat.	Name	Height	Weight	DOB	From	Yrs
F	25	(United States)	Brandon, Gennifer	6' 2" (1.88m)	164 lb (74kg)	1990-11-23	California	R
F	51	(United States)	Breland, Jessica	6' 3" (1.91m)	170 lb (77kg)	1988-02-23	North Carolina	2
G	0	(United States)	Clements, Courtney	6' 0" (1.83m)	157 lb (71kg)	1989-11-12	San Diego State	1
G/F	11	(United States)	Delle Donne, Elena	6' 5" (1.96m)	188 lb (85kg)	1989-09-05	Delaware	1
G	21	(United States)	Faulkner, Jamierra	5' 6" (1.68m)	141 lb (64kg)	1992-03-09	Southern Miss	R
C	34	(United States)	Fowles, Sylvia	6' 6" (1.98m)	208 lb (94kg)	1985-10-06	LSU	6
C	9	(United States)	Gatling, Markeisha	6' 5" (1.96m)	255 lb (116kg)	1992-07-14	NC State	R
C	45	(United States)	Goodlett, Sasha	6' 5" (1.96m)	239 lb (108kg)	1990-08-09	Georgia Tech	2
G	10	(United States)	Prince, Epiphanny	5' 9" (1.75m)	164 lb (74kg)	1988-01-11	Rutgers	4
G	14	(United States)	Quigley, Allie	5' 10" (1.78m)	140 lb (64kg)	1986-06-20	DePaul	5
G	22	(United States)	Vandersloot, Courtney	5' 8" (1.73m)	132 lb (60kg)	1989-02-08	Gonzaga	3
F	1	(United States)	Young, Tamera	6' 2" (1.88m)	172 lb (78kg)	1986-10-30	James Madison	6

Head coach
(United States) Pokey Chatman (LSU)
Assistant coaches
(United States) Tree Rollins (Clemson)
(United States) Christie Sides (Louisiana Tech)
Athletic trainer
(United States) Christie Sides (Louisiana Tech)
Strength and conditioning coach
(United States) Ann Crosby (Western Michigan)

Legend

- (C) Team captain
- (DP) Unsigned draft pick
- (FA) Free agent
- (S) Suspended
- Injured
