= 2012 Indiana Fever season =

13th season in the WNBA

- WNBA champions
- Head coach: Lin Dunn
- Arena: Bankers Life Fieldhouse

Results
- Record: 22–12 (.647)
- Place: 2nd (Eastern)
- Playoff finish: WNBA champions (def. Lynx 3–1)

Media
- Television: Fox Sports Indiana; ESPN2, NBATV
- Radio: WFNI

The 2012 WNBA season was the 13th season for the Indiana Fever of the Women's National Basketball Association.

== Transactions ==
=== WNBA draft ===
The following are the Fever's selections in the 2012 WNBA draft.

| Round | Pick | Player | Nationality | School/team/country |
|---|---|---|---|---|
| 1 | 11 | Sasha Goodlett | United States | Georgia Tech |
| 3 | 34 (from Sea.) | Courtney Hurt | United States | VCU |

=== Transaction log ===
- April 11, 2011: The Fever acquired a third-round pick in the 2012 Draft from the Seattle Storm as part of the Katie Smith transaction. The Fever sent a second-round pick to Seattle as part of the trade.
- February 3: The Fever re-signed Erin Phillips.
- February 8: The Fever re-signed Tamika Catchings.
- February 14: The Fever re-signed Shyra Ely.
- March 1: The Fever traded Tangela Smith to the San Antonio Silver Stars in exchange for Roneeka Hodges.
- March 14: The Fever signed Jenna Smith and Erlana Larkins.
- March 16: The Fever re-signed Shannon Bobbitt.
- April 24: The Fever signed La'Tangela Atkinson, and draft picks Sasha Goodlett and Courtney Hurt.
- May 3: The Fever waived Courtney Hurt and Jenna Smith.
- May 11: The Fever waived Shyra Ely and La'Tangela Atkinson.
- May 14: The Fever waived Shannon Bobbitt.
- July 2: The Fever traded Roneeka Hodges to the Tulsa Shock in exchange for Karima Christmas.

=== Trades ===
| Date | Trade | |
|---|---|---|
| March 1, 2012 | To Indiana Fever | To San Antonio Silver Stars |
| March 1, 2012 | Roneeka Hodges | Tangela Smith |
| July 2, 2012 | To Indiana Fever | To Tulsa Shock |
| July 2, 2012 | Karima Christmas | Roneeka Hodges |

=== Personnel changes ===
==== Additions ====
| Player | Signed | Former team |
| Erlana Larkins | March 14, 2012 | free agent |
| Sasha Goodlett | April 16, 2012 | draft pick |
| Karima Christmas | July 2, 2012 | Tulsa Shock |

==== Subtractions ====
| Player | Left | New team |
| Shyra Ely | 2012 | injured |
| Tangela Smith | March 1, 2012 | San Antonio Silver Stars |
| Shannon Bobbitt | May 14, 2012 | free agent |

== Roster ==
2012 Indiana Fever roster
Players
Coaches

| Pos. | No. | Nat. | Name | Height | Weight | DOB | From | Yrs |
|---|---|---|---|---|---|---|---|---|
| F | 24 | (United States) | Catchings, Tamika | 6' 1" (1.85m) | 167 lb (76kg) | 1979-07-21 | Tennessee | 11 |
| G/F | 11 | (United States) | Christmas, Karima | 6' 0" (1.83m) | 180 lb (82kg) | 1989-09-11 | Duke | 2 |
| G | 32 | (United States) | Pohlen, Jeanette | 6' 0" (1.83m) | 171 lb (78kg) | 1989-05-02 | Stanford | 2 |
| C | 50 | (United States) | Davenport, Jessica | 6' 5" (1.96m) | 215 lb (98kg) | 1985-06-21 | Ohio State | 6 |
| G/F | 23 | (United States) | Douglas, Katie | 6' 0" (1.83m) | 165 lb (75kg) | 1979-05-07 | Purdue | 12 |
| C | 45 | (United States) | Goodlett, Sasha | 6' 5" (1.96m) | 239 lb (108kg) | 1990-08-09 | Georgia Tech | R |
| G | 20 | (United States) | January, Briann | 5' 8" (1.73m) | 144 lb (65kg) | 1987-01-11 | Arizona State | 4 |
| F | 2 | (United States) | Larkins, Erlana | 6' 1" (1.85m) | 202 lb (92kg) | 1986-04-02 | North Carolina | 3 |
| G | 13 | (Australia) | Phillips, Erin | 5' 8" (1.73m) | 165 lb (75kg) | 1985-05-19 | Australia | 5 |
| C | 8 | (Canada) | Sutton-Brown, Tammy | 6' 4" (1.93m) | 199 lb (90kg) | 1978-01-27 | Rutgers | 12 |
| G | 1 | (United States) | Zellous, Shavonte | 5' 10" (1.78m) | 155 lb (70kg) | 1986-08-28 | Pittsburgh | 4 |

Head coach
(United States) Lin Dunn (UT Martin)
Assistant coaches
(United States) Mickie DeMoss (Louisiana Tech)
(United States) Stephanie White (Purdue)
Athletic trainer
(United States) Todd Champlin (Daemen)
Strength and conditioning coach
(United States) Emily Novitsky (Slippery Rock)

Legend

- (C) Team captain
- (DP) Unsigned draft pick
- (FA) Free agent
- (S) Suspended
- Injured

=== Depth ===
| Pos. | Starter | Bench |
|---|---|---|
| C | Tammy Sutton-Brown | Jessica Davenport; Sasha Goodlett |
| PF | Tamika Catchings | Erlana Larkins |
| SF | Katie Douglas | Karima Christmas |
| SG | Shavonte Zellous | Jeanette Pohlen |
| PG | Briann January | Erin Phillips |

== Season standings ==
| Eastern Conference | W | L | PCT | GB | Home | Road | Conf. |
|---|---|---|---|---|---|---|---|
| Connecticut Sun ^{y} | 25 | 9 | .735 | – | 12–5 | 13–4 | 18–4 |
| Indiana Fever ^{x} | 22 | 12 | .647 | 3.0 | 13–4 | 9–8 | 15–7 |
| Atlanta Dream ^{x} | 19 | 15 | .559 | 6.0 | 11–6 | 8–9 | 12–10 |
| New York Liberty ^{x} | 15 | 19 | .441 | 10.0 | 9–8 | 6–11 | 10–12 |
| Chicago Sky ^{o} | 14 | 20 | .412 | 11.0 | 7–10 | 7–10 | 8–14 |
| Washington Mystics ^{o} | 5 | 29 | .147 | 20.0 | 4–13 | 1–16 | 3–19 |

== Schedule ==
=== Preseason ===
2012 Game Log: Preseason (May)

| Game | Date | Time (ET) | Opponent | TV | Score | High points | High rebounds | High assists | Location/Attendance | Record |
|---|---|---|---|---|---|---|---|---|---|---|
| 1 | Sat 5 | 8:00 | @ San Antonio | | 69–67 | Hodges (16) | Larkins (7) | Atkinson; January; Zellous (3) | Trinity University; N/A | 1–0 |
| 2 | Wed 9 | 12:00 | San Antonio | | 78–69 | Hodges (10) | Davenport (5) | Bobbitt; Catchings (4) | Bankers Life Fieldhouse; 5,270 | 2–0 |

=== Regular season ===
2012 Game Log: Regular Season
May (3–0)

| Game | Date | Time (ET) | Opponent | TV | Score | High points | High rebounds | High assists | Location/Attendance | Record |
|---|---|---|---|---|---|---|---|---|---|---|
| 1 | Sat 19 | 7:00 | Atlanta | FS-I; SSO | 92–84 | Douglas (21) | Davenport (10) | Catchings; Douglas; January; Phillips (3) | Bankers Life Fieldhouse; 9,403 | 1–0 |
| 2 | Fri 25 | 8:30 | @ Chicago | CN100 | 83–72 | Catchings (22) | Zellous (7) | Catchings (5) | Allstate Arena; 6,198 | 2–0 |
| 3 | Sun 27 | 3:00 | @ Atlanta | SSO | 78–62 | Catchings (25) | Catchings (12) | January (5) | Philips Arena; 7,282 | 3–0 |

June (5–5)

| Game | Date | Time (ET) | Opponent | TV | Score | High points | High rebounds | High assists | Location/Attendance | Record |
|---|---|---|---|---|---|---|---|---|---|---|
| 4 | Sat 2 | 7:00 | New York | FS-I | 91–68 | Catchings (16) | Goodlett (6) | January (5) | Bankers Life Fieldhouse; 8,006 | 4–0 |
| 5 | Sun 3 | 6:00 | @ New York | MSG | 72–87 | Catchings (19) | Catchings; January (6) | Zellous (4) | Prudential Center; 4,905 | 4–1 |
| 6 | Fri 8 | 7:00 | Connecticut | | 81–89 | Catchings (31) | Catchings; Sutton-Brown (8) | January (6) | Bankers Life Fieldhouse; 6,041 | 4–2 |
| 7 | Fri 15 | 7:00 | @ Washington | CSN-MA | 66–67 | Catchings (15) | Catchings (9) | Douglas; January (4) | Verizon Center; 8,050 | 4–3 |
| 8 | Sat 16 | 7:00 | Chicago | CN100 | 84–70 | Davenport (19) | Catchings (7) | Douglas (8) | Bankers Life Fieldhouse; 6,098 | 5–3 |
| 9 | Tue 19 | 7:00 | @ Connecticut | CPTV-S | 85–88 (OT) | Douglas (23) | Douglas (9) | Catchings (5) | Mohegan Sun Arena; 6,503 | 5–4 |
| 10 | Thu 21 | 7:00 | Connecticut | FS-I; CPTV-S | 95–61 | January (20) | Catchings (10) | Catchings (8) | Bankers Life Fieldhouse; 6,326 | 6–4 |
| 11 | Sat 23 | 8:00 | @ Tulsa | | 73–70 | Catchings (16) | Catchings (8) | Catchings; Douglas; January (4) | BOK Center; 4,209 | 7–4 |
| 12 | Tue 26 | 12:00 | @ Atlanta | SSO | 58–70 | Catchings; Davenport; Douglas (8) | Larkins (7) | January (6) | Philips Arena; 8,388 | 7–5 |
| 13 | Wed 27 | 12:30 | @ Chicago | | 81–72 | Zellous (18) | Sutton-Brown (8) | Catchings (9) | Allstate Arena; 6,312 | 8–5 |

July (2–2)

| Game | Date | Time (ET) | Opponent | TV | Score | High points | High rebounds | High assists | Location/Attendance | Record |
|---|---|---|---|---|---|---|---|---|---|---|
| 14 | Thu 5 | 7:00 | San Antonio | NBATV | 72–88 | Douglas (19) | Catchings (15) | Catchings; Douglas (4) | Bankers Life Fieldhouse; 6,088 | 8–6 |
| 15 | Sat 7 | 7:00 | Chicago | CN100 | 88–86 (OT) | Catchings (18) | Catchings (9) | Catchings (6) | Bankers Life Fieldhouse; 6,155 | 9–6 |
| 16 | Tue 10 | 12:00 | New York | | 84–82 | Catchings (23) | Douglas (7) | January (4) | Bankers Life Fieldhouse; 9,216 | 10–6 |
| 17 | Thu 12 | 7:00 | Los Angeles | ESPN2 | 74–77 | Catchings (27) | Catchings; Larkins (6) | January (4) | Bankers Life Fieldhouse; 7,244 | 10–7 |
Summer Olympic break

August (6–1)

| Game | Date | Time (ET) | Opponent | TV | Score | High points | High rebounds | High assists | Location/Attendance | Record |
|---|---|---|---|---|---|---|---|---|---|---|
Summer Olympic break
| 18 | Thu 16 | 7:00 | Washington | NBATV | 84–66 | Larkins (16) | Catchings (14) | Zellous (5) | Bankers Life Fieldhouse; 6,834 | 11–7 |
| 19 | Sat 18 | 7:00 | Atlanta | NBATV; FS-I; SSO | 86–72 | Douglas (29) | Catchings (9) | Catchings; January (5) | Bankers Life Fieldhouse; 9,302 | 12–7 |
| 20 | Tue 21 | 10:30 | @ Los Angeles | TWC101 | 69–79 | Douglas (22) | Larkins (8) | Catchings (3) | Staples Center; 8,402 | 12–8 |
| 21 | Thu 23 | 10:00 | @ Seattle | | 68–66 | Catchings (18) | Catchings (11) | January (4) | KeyArena; 5,819 | 13–8 |
| 22 | Sat 25 | 10:00 | @ Phoenix | | 85–72 | January (22) | Douglas; Phillips; Davenport (6) | Catchings (6) | US Airways Center; 9,079 | 14–8 |
| 23 | Tue 28 | 7:00 | Washington | | 83–68 | Douglas (18) | Catchings; Davenport (5) | Catchings (5) | Bankers Life Fieldhouse; 6,525 | 15–8 |
| 24 | Thu 30 | 7:00 | @ New York | NBATV; MSG | 76–63 | Catchings (22) | Catchings (5) | January (8) | Prudential Center; 5,315 | 16–8 |

September (6–4)

| Game | Date | Time (ET) | Opponent | TV | Score | High points | High rebounds | High assists | Location/Attendance | Record |
|---|---|---|---|---|---|---|---|---|---|---|
| 25 | Sat 1 | 7:00 | Chicago | NBATV; CN100 | 81–64 | January (19) | Catchings (10) | January (4) | Bankers Life Fieldhouse; 9,307 | 17–8 |
| 26 | Wed 5 | 7:00 | @ Atlanta | NBATV; FS-I; FS-S | 64–71 | Douglas (23) | Catchings (9) | January (5) | Philips Arena; 4,112 | 17–9 |
| 27 | Fri 7 | 8:00 | @ San Antonio | | 82–78 | Catchings (26) | Catchings (11) | January (6) | AT&T Center; 8,097 | 18–9 |
| 28 | Sun 9 | 6:00 | Phoenix | NBATV; FS-I | 89–83 | Douglas (30) | Catchings; Larkins (5) | January (5) | Bankers Life Fieldhouse; 7,971 | 19–9 |
| 29 | Wed 12 | 7:00 | Seattle | NBATV | 72–48 | Douglas (16) | Catchings; Larkins (7) | Larkins (4) | Bankers Life Fieldhouse; 6,337 | 20–9 |
| 30 | Fri 14 | 7:00 | Minnesota | | 64–66 | January (16) | Catchings (12) | January (4) | Bankers Life Fieldhouse; 8,819 | 20–10 |
| 31 | Sun 17 | 8:00 | @ Minnesota | NBATV; FS-I | 79–86 | Catchings (19) | Catchings (10) | January; Phillips (5) | Target Center; 9,523 | 20–11 |
| 32 | Wed 19 | 7:00 | @ Connecticut | | 67–73 | Douglas (19) | Christmas (6) | Catchings; Christmas (3) | Mohegan Sun Arena; 5,811 | 20–12 |
| 33 | Fri 21 | 7:00 | @ Washington | NBATV | 66–53 | Phillips (19) | Larkins (11) | Catchings (4) | Verizon Center; 7,702 | 21–12 |
| 34 | Sun 23 | 5:00 | Tulsa | NBATV; FS-I | 91–58 | Phillips (21) | Catchings (10) | Larkins; Sutton-Brown; Christmas (3) | Bankers Life Fieldhouse; 9,225 | 22–12 |

All games are viewable on WNBA LiveAccess or ESPN3.com

=== Postseason ===
2012 Game Log: Postseason
Eastern Conference Semifinals

| Game | Date | Time (ET) | Opponent | TV | Score | High points | High rebounds | High assists | Location/Attendance | Series |
|---|---|---|---|---|---|---|---|---|---|---|
| 1 | September 28 | 7:00 | Atlanta | ESPN2 | 66–75 | Douglas (13) | Catchings (11) | Catchings; January (3) | Bankers Life Fieldhouse; 7,776 | 0–1 |
| 2 | September 30 | 4:00 | @ Atlanta | ESPN | 103–88 | Catchings (25) | Catchings (13) | January (7) | Philips Arena; 6,890 | 1–1 |
| 3 | October 2 | 7:00 | Atlanta | NBATV | 75–64 | Douglas (24) | Larkins (20) | January (5) | Bankers Life Fieldhouse; 6,840 | 2–1 |

Eastern Conference Finals

| Game | Date | Time (ET) | Opponent | TV | Score | High points | High rebounds | High assists | Location/Attendance | Series |
|---|---|---|---|---|---|---|---|---|---|---|
| 1 | October 5 | 8:00 | @ Connecticut | ESPN2 | 64–76 | Douglas (27) | Catchings (9) | Catchings (5) | Mohegan Sun Arena; 7,599 | 0–1 |
| 2 | October 8 | 8:00 | Connecticut | ESPN2 | 78–76 | Douglas (24) | Larkins (11) | Douglas; January (2) | Bankers Life Fieldhouse; 9,225 | 1–1 |
| 3 | October 11 | 8:30 | @ Connecticut | ESPN2 | 87–71 | Catchings (22) | Catchings (13) | Catchings; January (4) | Mohegan Sun Arena; 6,516 | 2–1 |

WNBA Finals

| Game | Date | Time (ET) | Opponent | TV | Score | High points | High rebounds | High assists | Location/Attendance | Series |
|---|---|---|---|---|---|---|---|---|---|---|
| 1 | October 14 | 8:00 | @ Minnesota | ESPN2 | 76–70 | Catchings (20) | Larkins (15) | January (6) | Target Center; 14,322 | 1–0 |
| 2 | October 17 | 8:00 | @ Minnesota | ESPN | 71–83 | Catchings (27) | Catchings (8) | Phillips (4) | Target Center; 13,478 | 1–1 |
| 3 | October 19 | 8:00 | Minnesota | ESPN2 | 76–59 | Zellous (30) | Larkins (15) | Davenport (4) | Bankers Life Fieldhouse; 18,165 | 2–1 |
| 4 | October 21 | 8:00 | Minnesota | ESPN2 | 87–78 | Catchings (25) | Larkins (13) | Catchings (8) | Bankers Life Fieldhouse; 15,213 | 3–1 |
