= Briann January =

American basketball player and coach (born 1987)

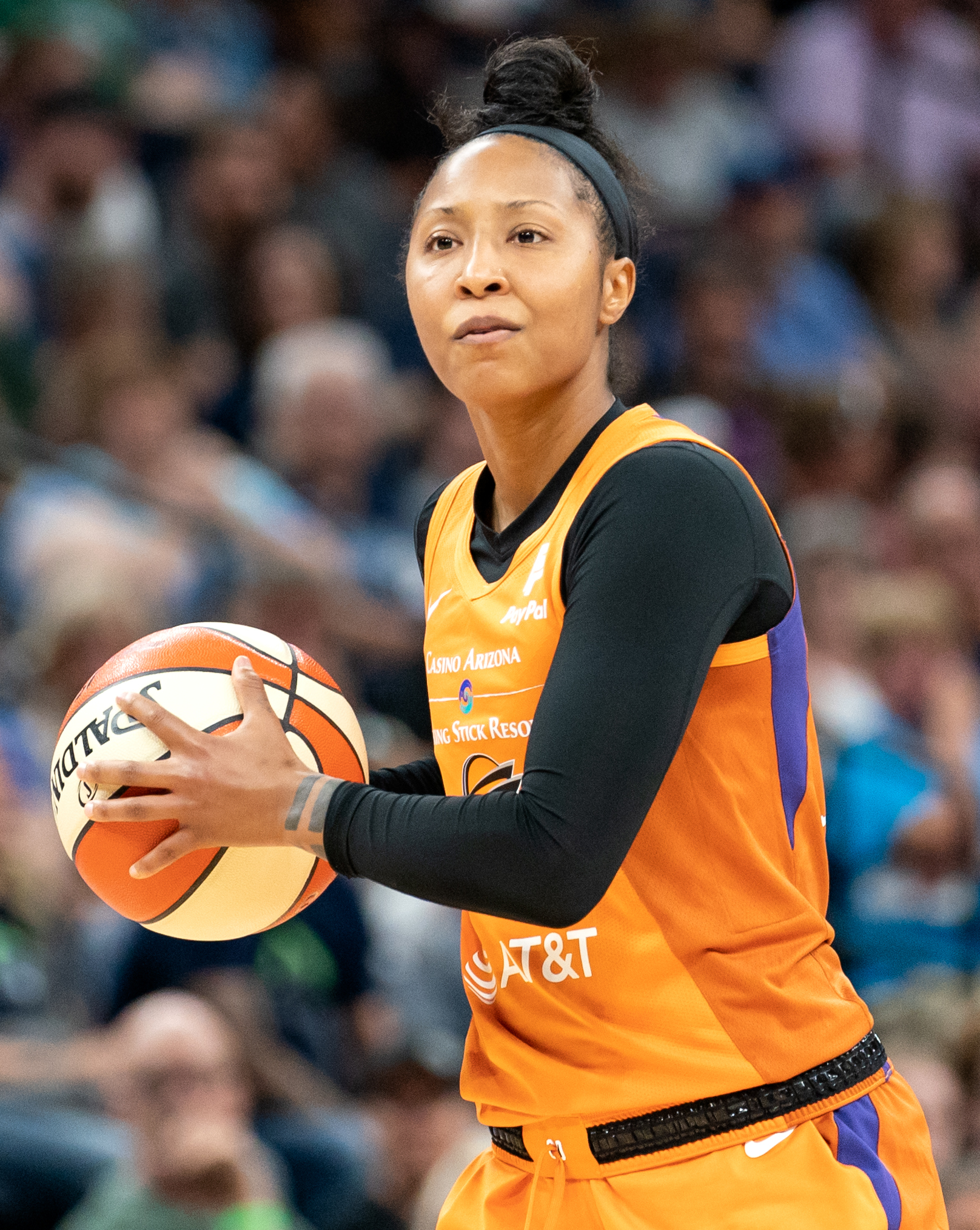
- January in 2019

Indiana Fever
- Title: Assistant coach
- League: WNBA

Personal information
- Born: January 11, 1987 (age 39) Spokane, Washington, U.S.
- Listed height: 5 ft 8 in (1.73 m)
- Listed weight: 144 lb (65 kg)

Career information
- High school: Lewis and Clark (Spokane, Washington)
- College: Arizona State (2005–2009)
- WNBA draft: 2009: 1st round, 6th overall pick
- Drafted by: Indiana Fever
- Playing career: 2009–2022
- Position: Point guard

Career history

Playing
- 2009–2017: Indiana Fever
- 2009–2010: Tarsus Belediyesi
- 2010–2011: Raanana Hertzeliya
- 2012–2013: Elektra Ramat Hasharon
- 2013–2014: Maranhao Basquete
- 2014–2015: Adana ASKİ SK
- 2016–2017: Adana ASKİ SK
- 2018–2019: Phoenix Mercury
- 2019: Sopron Basket
- 2020–2021: Connecticut Sun
- 2022: Seattle Storm

Coaching
- 2017–2018: Arizona State (assistant)
- 2023–2024: Connecticut Sun (assistant)
- 2024–2025: Motor City Cruise (assistant)
- 2025–Present: Indiana Fever (assistant)

Career highlights
- As Assistant Coach: WNBA Commissioner's Cup Champion (2025); As player: WNBA champion (2012); WNBA All-Star (2014); 5× WNBA All-Defensive First Team (2012, 2014–2016, 2021); 2× WNBA All-Defensive Second Team (2013, 2017); EuroLeague champion (2022); All Pac-10 (2009); 2× Pac-10 Defensive Player of the Year (2008, 2009); 2× Pac-10 All-Defensive Team (2008, 2009); Pac-10 All-Freshman Team (2006); No. 20 retired by Arizona State Sun Devils
- Stats at WNBA.com
- Stats at Basketball Reference

Briann Jolie January (born January 11, 1987) is an American former professional basketball player in the Women's National Basketball Association (WNBA) and current assistant coach for the Indiana Fever of the WNBA. After a successful college career at Arizona State University, January was drafted by the Indiana Fever with the sixth overall pick in the 2009 WNBA draft. She has also played for the Phoenix Mercury, the Connecticut Sun, and the Seattle Storm.

== Early life ==
Briann Jolie January was born in Spokane, Washington on January 11, 1987, the daughter of Barry, a karate instructor, and Sally, a teacher. She has a younger sister, Kiara. January holds a black belt in karate.

January was a 2005 graduate of Lewis and Clark High School in Spokane, Washington, earning first-team all-state honors by both the Associated Press and the Seattle Times. January served as a team captain in track and field as a senior. She won the state high jump title in 2004, with her personal best in the high jump being 5'8". Led Lewis and Clark to a 25–3 record and an appearance in the state semifinals as a senior, averaging 13 points a game in her final season, and was team MVP and assists leader in each of her four seasons.

== College career ==
January attended Arizona State University for four seasons. As a freshman, January was named to the Pac-10's 2006 All-Freshman Team after a season in which she finished first on the team in both assists (86) and steals (46). The 86 assists represented the second-highest total ever for a Sun Devil freshman. When January was a sophomore she earned All-Pac-10 Honorable Mention honors for a season in which she finished No. 3 in the Pac-10 in steals (2.1 per game), No. 4 in assists (4.0 per game), No. 4 in assist-to-turnover ratio (1.67) and No. 6 in free throw percentage (81.7). In her final season as a Sun Devil, January set the school's single-season record for three-point field goals (65). She also tied the school's single-game record with seven three-pointers in ASU's win at UC Davis on December 3. After four seasons as a Sun Devil, January is the only player in school history to lead the team in steals and assists four straight years.

Entering her senior season at Arizona State in 2008, January appeared on a regional cover of Sports Illustrated with fellow Sun Devil and future NBA star James Harden.

== College statistics ==
Legend
GP	Games played	GS	Games started	MPG	Minutes per game
FG%	Field goal percentage	3P%	3-point field goal percentage	FT%	Free throw percentage
RPG	Rebounds per game	APG	Assists per game	SPG	Steals per game
BPG	Blocks per game	PPG	Points per game	**Bold**	Career high

Year	Team	GP	Points	FG%	3P%	FT%	RPG	APG	SPG	BPG	PPG
2005-06	Arizona State	32	155	33.9	21.7	79.5	2.3	2.7	1.4	0.1	4.8
2006-07	Arizona State	**35**	358	44.0	42.3	81.7	2.2	4.0	2.1	0.2	10.2
2007-08	Arizona State	33	374	**44.4**	34.8	**86.4**	**3.0**	4.4	**2.2**	0.1	11.3
2008-09	Arizona State	**35**	**430**	43.3	**44.8**	83.5	2.5	**4.8**	2.1	**0.4**	**12.3**
Career	Arizona State	135	1317	42.6	39.9	83.0	2.5	4.0	2.0	0.2	9.8

== WNBA career ==
January was drafted with the 6th overall pick in the 2009 WNBA draft by the Indiana Fever. As a rookie in the WNBA, January came off the bench, playing 33 games with 4 starts while averaging 6.9 points per game for the Fever. January also experienced her first WNBA finals appearance in her rookie season with the Fever, who were led by Tamika Catchings and Katie Douglas advanced all the way to the 2009 WNBA Finals where they lost 3–2 to the Phoenix Mercury. En route to the finals, January was able to provide an offensive spark off the bench for the Fever during the playoffs, averaging 10.6 points per game in 10 games.

In the 2011 season, January officially became the starting point guard for the Fever, but after playing only 10 games, she was sidelined for the rest of the season with a torn ACL.

In 2012, January came back healthy and averaged a career-high 10.3 points per game. She was the Fever's third-leading scorer on the roster that would eventually win the WNBA championship, they had defeated the championship-defending Minnesota Lynx 3–1 in the finals. In February 2013, January signed a multi-year contract with the Fever.

In 2014, January was named a WNBA All-Star for the first time in her career, she had tied her career high in scoring average for the whole season.

In 2015, January was shooting a career-high in both field goal and three-point field goal percentage. The Fever advanced to the finals for the second time in four years. They had once again faced the Minnesota Lynx but lost the series in five games. In August 2015, January signed a multi-year contract extension with the Fever. At the conclusion of the 2015 season, she was named to the All-Defensive First Team alongside Fever teammate, Tamika Catchings.

In 2016 and 2017, January would be named to first and second all-defensive team, respectively.

After nine seasons played with the Fever, January was traded to the Phoenix Mercury in exchange for a top-10 draft pick in March 2018. In 2018, January would be the starting point guard for the Mercury, joining Diana Taurasi in the backcourt. She would put a new career high in three-point percentage while leading the league in that category. The Mercury finished 20–14 with the number 5 seed in the league. They would defeat the Dallas Wings in the first-round elimination game 101–83. In the second round elimination game, the Mercury defeated the Connecticut Sun 96–86. In the semi-finals, the Mercury lost in five games to the Seattle Storm.

In 2019, January re-signed with the Mercury to a multi-year deal. On July 10, 2019, January scored a season-high 18 points in a 91–68 victory against the Washington Mystics. The Mercury finished as the number 8 seed with a 15–19 record. The Mercury were eliminated in the first round elimination game 105–76 by the Chicago Sky.

== Overseas career ==
For the 2009–10 off-season, January played in Turkey for Tarsus Belediyes. In the 2010–11 off-season, January played in Israel for Raanana Hertzeliya. In the 2012–13 off-season, January played in Israel once again for Elektra Ramat Hasharon. In the 2013–14 off-season, January played in Brazil for Maranhao Basquete. In the 2014–15 off-season, January played in Turkey once again for Adana ASKİ SK. In July 2016, January signed with Adana ASKİ SK for a second stint during the 2016–17 off-season. In 2019, January signed with Sopron Basket of the Hungarian League for the 2019–20 off-season.

== Coaching career ==
January spent the 2013–14 off-season as a volunteer assistant coach for the Adelphi University women's basketball program. With January's help, the team advanced to the NCAA tournament as a #2 seed, after losing 48 games over the previous three seasons. In August 2017, it was announced that January would be the assistant coach for Arizona State's women's basketball team during the off-season.

January returned to the coaching world when the Connecticut Sun announced her as a new assistant coach for Stephanie White's staff on January 3, 2023.

On November 11, 2024, January became an assistant coach for the Motor City Cruise of the NBA G League.

On April 2, 2025, Fever announced that January would return to the franchise as their new Assistant Coach.

== Career statistics ==
Legend
GP	Games played	GS	Games started	MPG	Minutes per game	RPG	Rebounds per game
APG	Assists per game	SPG	Steals per game	BPG	Blocks per game	PPG	Points per game
TO	Turnovers per game	FG%	Field-goal percentage	3P%	3-point field-goal percentage	FT%	Free-throw percentage
**Bold**	Career best	°	League leader

†	Denotes seasons in which January won a WNBA championship

=== WNBA ===
==== Regular season ====
WNBA regular season statistics
Year	Team	GP	GS	MPG	FG%	3P%	FT%	RPG	APG	SPG	BPG	TO	PPG
2009	Indiana	33	4	20.7	.333	.287	.851	1.9	2.3	1.0	0.0	1.7	6.9
2010	Indiana	30	7	21.9	.371	.356	.826	2.0	3.1	1.2	0.1	2.2	7.4
2011	Indiana	10	10	28.6	.357	.318	.829	1.4	**5.0**	**1.5**	0.0	3.3	8.6
2012^{†}	Indiana	31	26	28.4	.404	.430	.874	1.8	3.9	1.1	0.1	2.4	**10.3**
2013	Indiana	32	32	29.6	.348	.357	.811	**2.4**	3.7	1.0	0.1	2.4	9.8
2014	Indiana	31	31	28.9	.387	.383	**.880**	1.6	3.7	1.2	**0.2**	2.2	**10.3**
2015	Indiana	29	29	27.0	**.426**	.431°	.845	1.8	3.4	1.0	**0.2**	2.1	8.1
2016	Indiana	29	27	28.1	.401	.392	.875	1.8	4.7	1.2	0.1	1.7	9.7
2017	Indiana	25	24	26.3	.395	.316	.817	1.5	3.9	0.9	0.1	2.1	9.5
2018	Phoenix	33	**33**	27.1	.423	**.470**°	.806	2.1	3.3	0.5	0.1	1.4	7.0
2019	Phoenix	32	26	26.6	.390	.378	.836	1.3	3.3	0.8	0.0	1.6	6.5
2020	Connecticut	33	13	23.3	.293	.355	.833	1.2	3.4	0.6	**0.2**	**1.2**	5.0
2021	Connecticut	29	29	**30.2**	.425	.380	.868	1.4	3.1	0.9	0.1	1.8	7.0
2022	Seattle	**36**	5	16.9	.377	.311	.826	1.0	2.4	0.6	**0.2**	1.5	3.7
**Career**	14 years, 4 teams	393	293	25.8	.385	.376	.845	1.7	3.4	1.0	0.1	2.0	7.8
**Career**	All-Star	1	0	17.0	.500	.600	—	1.0	4.0	0.0	0.0	3.0	9.0

==== Playoffs ====
WNBA playoff statistics
Year	Team	GP	GS	MPG	FG%	3P%	FT%	RPG	APG	SPG	BPG	TO	PPG
2009	Indiana	10	0	**38.5**	.385	.414	.850	2.4	3.0	0.4	0.0	1.3	10.6
2010	Indiana	3	0	19.7	.313	.200	.900	1.3	2.0	0.3	0.0	2.6	6.7
2012^{†}	Indiana	10	10	34.1	.426	.227	.900	2.3	3.8	1.6	0.3	3.0	11.5
2013	Indiana	4	4	29.6	.370	.444	.857	2.8	3.5	0.5	0.0	2.0	7.5
2014	Indiana	5	5	35.2	.322	.353	.833	2.8	4.2	1.2	**0.8**	2.0	**12.8**
2015	Indiana	**11**	**11**	32.2	.407	.286	.933	2.3	**5.0**	**1.3**	0.2	2.7	11.3
2016	Indiana	1	1	33.3	.308	.000	.667	0.0	9.0	3.0	0.0	1.0	12.0
2018	Phoenix	7	7	35.4	.352	.276	.667	**2.9**	3.7	0.7	0.0	1.0	7.1
2019	Phoenix	1	1	26.4	.429	.000	**1.000**°	2.0	2.0	1.0	0.0	3.0	12.0
2020	Connecticut	7	7	32.6	.347	.345	**1.000**	1.9	3.6	0.9	0.0	**0.9**	9.0
2021	Connecticut	3	3	34.0	**.529**	**.625**	.676	2.3	3.0	1.0	0.0	1.7	10.7
2022	Seattle	6	0	7.2	.500	.00	.00	0.5	1.2	0.0	0.0	0.7	1.0
**Career**	12 years, 4 teams	68	49	28.7	.384	.324	.855	2.2	3.6	0.9	0.2	1.8	9.3
