= 2012 WNBA playoffs =

Professional women's basketball championship

- Dates: September 27 – October 21, 2012

Final positions
- Champions: Indiana Fever
- Runners-up: Minnesota Lynx

Tournament statistics
- Scoring leader (s): Tamika Catchings (Indiana) (19.0 PPG)

Awards
- MVP: Tamika Catchings (Indiana)

The 2012 WNBA playoffs was the postseason for the Women's National Basketball Association's 2012 season. Four teams from each of the league's two conferences qualified for the playoffs, seeded 1 to 4 in a tournament bracket, with the two opening rounds in a best-of-three format, and the final in a best-of-five format.

The Minnesota Lynx qualified as the overall top seed, and the Los Angeles Sparks, San Antonio Silver Stars, and Seattle Storm also qualified in the West. The Connecticut Sun were the top seed in the East, joined by the Indiana Fever, Atlanta Dream, and New York Liberty.

Minnesota won the Western Conference championship, and Indiana won the Eastern Conference championship. The Fever won the 2012 WNBA Finals, winning three games to the Lynx's one.

== Tiebreak procedures ==
=== Two-team tie ===
1. Better record in head-to-head games.
2. Better winning percentage within own conference.
3. Better winning percentage against all teams with .500 or better record at the end of the season.
4. Better point differential in games head-to-head.
5. Coin toss.

=== Three or more-team tie ===
1. Better winning percentage among all head-to-head games involving tied teams.
2. Better winning percentage against teams within conference (for first two rounds of playoffs) or better record against teams in the opposite conference (for Finals).
3. Better winning percentage against all teams with a .500 or better record at the end of the season.
4. Better point differential in games involving tied teams.
5. Coin toss.

== Playoff qualifying ==
=== Eastern Conference ===
Seed	Team	W	L	Tiebreaker	Clinched	
Seed	Team	W	L	Tiebreaker	Playoff berth	Conference homecourt
1	Connecticut Sun	25	9	–	August 28	September 17
2	Indiana Fever	22	12	–	August 31	–
3	Atlanta Dream	19	15	–	September 14	–
4	New York Liberty	15	19	–	September 18	–

=== Western Conference ===
Seed	Team	W	L	Tiebreaker	Clinched	
Seed	Team	W	L	Tiebreaker	Playoff berth	League homecourt
1	Minnesota Lynx	27	7	–	August 19	September 15
2	Los Angeles Sparks	24	10	–	August 23	–
3	San Antonio Silver Stars	21	13	–	August 25	–
4	Seattle Storm	16	18	–	September 9	–

== Bracket ==
**Conference semifinals** Best-of-3
E1	**Connecticut**	2
E4	New York	0
**Eastern Conference**
E2	**Indiana**	2
E3	Atlanta	1
W1	**Minnesota**	2
W4	Seattle	1
**Western Conference**
W2	**Los Angeles**	2
W3	San Antonio	0

**Conference finals** Best-of-3
E1	Connecticut	1
E2	**Indiana**	2
W1	**Minnesota**	2
W2	Los Angeles	0

**WNBA Finals**; Best-of-5
E2	**Indiana**	3
W1	Minnesota	1

- **Bold** – Series winner
- Italic – Team with home-court advantage

== Eastern Conference ==
=== Conference semifinals ===
==== (1) Connecticut Sun vs. (4) New York Liberty ====
ESPN2

September 27
8:00pm ET

Game 1

New York Liberty 60, **Connecticut Sun** **65**
Scoring by quarter: 13–**23**, **21**–18, **11**–8, 15–**16**
Pts: Pondexter (14); Rebs: Pierson (9); Asts: Pondexter (6)	Pts: Charles (17); Rebs: Mims (7); Asts: Hightower, Lawson (5)

Mohegan Sun Arena, Uncasville, CT
Attendance: 5,520
Referees:
1. 55 Eric Brewton, #24 Tony Dawkins, #34 Maj Forsberg

NBATV

September 29
7:00pm ET

Game 2

**Connecticut Sun** **75**, New York Liberty 62
Scoring by quarter: 11–**22**, **16**–11, **23**–19, **25**–10
Pts: Charles (25); Rebs: Charles (14); Asts: Lawson (6)	Pts: Pondexter (20); Rebs: Vaughn (9); Asts: Pierson (5)
**Connecticut won the series, 2–0**

Prudential Center, Newark, NJ
Attendance: 7,854
Referees:
1. 44 Felicia Grinter, #42 Roy Gulbeyan, #45 Tom Mauer

Regular-season series

Connecticut won the regular-season series 4–1:

May 19, 2012

Report

**Connecticut Sun 78**, New York Liberty 73

Madison Square Garden, New York City, NY

May 20, 2012

Report

New York Liberty 77, **Connecticut Sun 92**

Mohegan Sun Arena, Uncasville, CT

June 15, 2012

Report

New York Liberty 55, **Connecticut Sun 97**

Mohegan Sun Arena, Uncasville, CT

August 16, 2012

Report

Connecticut Sun 66, **New York Liberty 79**

Prudential Center, Newark, NJ

August 18, 2012

Report

New York Liberty 74, **Connecticut Sun 85**

Mohegan Sun Arena, Uncasville, CT

==== (2) Indiana Fever vs. (3) Atlanta Dream ====
ESPN2

September 28
7:00pm ET

Game 1

**Atlanta Dream** **75**, Indiana Fever 66
Scoring by quarter: **25**–15, 16–**17**, **18**–14, 16–**20**
Pts: Harding (23); Rebs: Lyttle, McCoughtry (9); Asts: Harding (7)	Pts: Douglas (13); Rebs: Catchings (11); Asts: Catchings, January (3)

Bankers Life Fieldhouse, Indianapolis, IN
Attendance: 7,776
Referees:
1. 38 Lamont Simpson, #9 Denise Brooks, #21 Byron Jarrett

ESPN2

September 30
4:00pm ET

Game 2

**Indiana Fever** **103**, Atlanta Dream 88
Scoring by quarter: 22–**24**, **25**–21, **31**–20, **25**–23
Pts: Catchings (25); Rebs: Catchings (13); Asts: January (7)	Pts: McCoughtry (22); Rebs: de Souza (9); Asts: Harding (6)

Philips Arena, Atlanta
Attendance: 6,890
Referees:
1. 4 Sue Blauch, #8 Daryl Humphrey, #49 Kevin Sparrock

NBATV

October 2
7:00pm ET

Game 3

Atlanta Dream 64, **Indiana Fever** **75**
Scoring by quarter: 17–**25**, **22**–14, 12–**15**, 13–**21**
Pts: Harding (17); Rebs: de Souza, Harding (7); Asts: Price (4)	Pts: Douglas (24); Rebs: Larkins (20); Asts: January (5)
**Indiana won the series, 2–1**

Bankers Life Fieldhouse, Indianapolis, IN
Attendance: 6,840
Referees:
1. 39 Michael Price, #43 Brenda Pantoja, #45 Tom Mauer

Regular-season series

Indiana won the regular season series 3–2:

May 19, 2012

Report

Atlanta Dream 84, **Indiana Fever 92**

Bankers Life Fieldhouse, Indianapolis, IN

May 27, 2012

Report

**Indiana Fever** 78, Atlanta Dream 62

Philips Arena, Atlanta, GA

June 26, 2012

Report

Indiana Fever 58, **Atlanta Dream 70**

Philips Arena, Atlanta, GA

August 18, 2012

Report

Atlanta Dream 72, **Indiana Fever 86**

Bankers Life Fieldhouse, Indianapolis, IN

September 6, 2011

Report

Indiana Fever 64, **Atlanta Dream 71**

Philips Arena, Atlanta, GA

=== Conference finals ===
==== (1) Connecticut Sun vs. (2) Indiana Fever ====
ESPN2

October 5
8:00pm ET

Game 1

Indiana Fever 64, **Connecticut Sun** **76**
Scoring by quarter: **22**–14, 8–**16**, 13–**22**, 21–**24**
Pts: Douglas (27); Rebs: Catchings (9); Asts: Catchings (5)	Pts: Charles (18); Rebs: Charles (15); Asts: Montgomery (7)

Mohegan Sun Arena, Uncasville, CT
Attendance: 7,599
Referees:
1. 4 Sue Blauch, #38 Lamont Simpson, #7 Clarke Stevens

ESPN2

October 8
8:00pm ET

Game 2

Connecticut Sun 76, **Indiana Fever** **78**
Scoring by quarter: **24**–20, 19–**26**, **14**–10, 19–**22**
Pts: Lawson (18); Rebs: Jones (10); Asts: Jones, Montgomery (4)	Pts: Douglas (24); Rebs: Larkins (11); Asts: Douglas, January (2)

Bankers Life Fieldhouse, Indianapolis, IN
Attendance: 9,225
Referees:
1. 39 Michael Price, #18 Kurt Walker, #43 Brenda Pantoja

ESPN2

October 11
8:30pm ET

Game 3

**Indiana Fever** **87**, Connecticut Sun 71
Scoring by quarter: **18**–10, **25**–14, **25**–24, 19–**23**
Pts: Catchings (22); Rebs: Catchings (13); Asts: Catchings, January (4)	Pts: Charles (18); Rebs: Charles (10); Asts: Lawson (4)
**Indiana won the series, 2–1**

Mohegan Sun Arena, Uncasville, CT
Attendance: 6,516
Referees:
1. 55 Eric Brewton, #9 Denise Brooks, #42 Roy Gulbeyan

Regular-season series

The Connecticut Sun won 3–1 in the regular season series:

June 8, 2012

Report

**Connecticut Sun 89**, Indiana Fever 81

Bankers Life Fieldhouse, Indianapolis, IN

June 19, 2012

Report

Indiana Fever 85, **Connecticut Sun 88**

Mohegan Sun Arena, Uncasville, CT

June 21, 2012

Report

Connecticut Sun 61, **Indiana Fever 95**

Bankers Life Fieldhouse, Indianapolis, IN

August 19, 2012

Report

Indiana Fever 67, **Connecticut Sun 73**

Mohegan Sun Arena, Uncasville, CT

== Western Conference ==
=== Conference semifinals ===
==== (2) Los Angeles Sparks vs. (3) San Antonio Silver Stars ====
ESPN2

September 27
10:00pm ET

Game 1*

San Antonio Silver Stars 86, **Los Angeles Sparks** **93**
Scoring by quarter: **25**–24, **19**–16, 23–**25**, 19–**28**
Pts: Hammon (19); Rebs: Appel (7); Asts: Hammon (6)	Pts: Toliver (29); Rebs: Parker (9); Asts: Beard (3)

Galen Center, Los Angeles, CA
Attendance: 5,013
Referees:
1. 39 Michael Price, #53 Jeff Smith, #13 Cameron Inouye

NBATV

September 29
3:00pm ET

Game 2

**Los Angeles Sparks** **101**, San Antonio Silver Stars 94
Scoring by quarter: **26**–16, **25**–24, **31**–26, 19–**28**
Pts: Parker (32); Rebs: Parker (9); Asts: Parker (6)	Pts: Young (28); Rebs: Adams (8); Asts: Robinson (5)
**Los Angeles won the series, 2–0**

Freeman Coliseum, San Antonio, TX
Attendance: 5,293
Referees:
1. 31 Amy Bonner, #35 Billy Smith, #55 Eric Brewton

Regular-season series

San Antonio won the regular-season series 3–1:

June 16, 2012

Report

Los Angeles Sparks 85, **San Antonio Silver Stars 98**

AT&T Center, San Antonio, TX

June 24, 2012

Report

**San Antonio Silver Stars 91**, Los Angeles Sparks 71

Staples Center, Los Angeles, CA

June 28, 2012

Report

Los Angeles Sparks 80, **San Antonio Silver Stars 94**

AT&T Center, San Antonio, TX

August 23, 2012

Report

San Antonio Silver Stars 77, **Los Angeles Sparks 101**

Staples Center, Los Angeles, CA

==== (1) Minnesota Lynx vs. (4) Seattle Storm ====
ESPN2

September 28
9:00pm ET

Game 1

Seattle Storm 70, **Minnesota Lynx** **78**
Scoring by quarter: 15–**18**, 12–**15**, 24–**27**, **19**–18
Pts: Stricklen (13); Rebs: Stricklen, Thompson (7); Asts: Wright (7)	Pts: Whalen (20); Rebs: Brunson (11); Asts: Whalen (6)

Target Center, Minneapolis, MN
Attendance: 9,213
Referees:
1. 4 Sue Blauch, #8 Daryl Humphrey, #49 Kevin Sparrock

ESPN

September 30
9:00pm ET

Game 2

Minnesota Lynx 79, **Seattle Storm** **86** (2OT)
Scoring by quarter: **27**–18, 10–**18**, **22**–17, 11–**17**, Overtime: 9–**16**
Pts: Brunson (22); Rebs: Brunson (15); Asts: Whalen (5)	Pts: Bird (22); Rebs: Jackson (14); Asts: Wright (7)

KeyArena, Seattle, WA
Attendance: 8,479
Referees:
1. 7 Clarke Stevens, #39 Michael Price, #43 Brenda Pantoja

ESPN2

October 2
9:00 PM ET

Game 3

Seattle Storm 72, **Minnesota Lynx** **73**
Scoring by quarter: 14–**22**, **21**–14, 17–**20**, **20**–17
Pts: Bird (19); Rebs: Jackson (6); Asts: Bird (11)	Pts: Augustus (21); Rebs: Brunson (9); Asts: McWilliams-Franklin (4)
**Minnesota won the series, 2–1**

Target Center, Minneapolis, MN
Attendance: 8,023
Referees:
1. 55 Eric Brewton, #9 Denise Brooks, #38 Lamont Simpson

Regular-season series

Minnesota won the regular-season series 3–1:

May 27, 2012

Report

Seattle Storm 71, **Minnesota Lynx 84**

Target Center, Minneapolis, MN

June 6, 2012

Report

Seattle Storm 55, **Minnesota Lynx 79**

Target Center, Minneapolis, MN

August 16, 2011

Report

Minnesota Lynx 62, **Seattle Storm 55**

KeyArena, Seattle, WA

September 9, 2011

Report

**Minnesota Lynx 86**, Seattle Storm 73

KeyArena, Seattle, WA

=== Conference finals ===
==== (1) Minnesota Lynx vs. (2) Los Angeles Sparks ====
ESPN2

October 4
8:00pm ET

Game 1

Los Angeles Sparks 77, **Minnesota Lynx** **94**
Scoring by quarter: 15–**16**, 16–**32**, **22**–18, 24–**28**
Pts: Parker (25); Rebs: Parker (11); Asts: Parker (4)	Pts: Moore (20); Rebs: Brunson (10); Asts: Augustus (7)

Target Center, Minneapolis, MN
Attendance: 8,513
Referees:
1. 42 Roy Gulbeyan, #8 Daryl Humphrey, #44 Felicia Grinter

ABC

October 7
3:30pm ET

Game 2

**Minnesota Lynx** **80**, Los Angeles Sparks 79
Scoring by quarter: **25**–17, 15–**22**, 17–**26**, **23**–14
Pts: Augustus (21); Rebs: Brunson (10); Asts: McWilliams-Franklin, Whalen (5)	Pts: Parker (33); Rebs: Parker (15); Asts: Beard (7)
**Minnesota won the series, 2–0**

Staples Center, Los Angeles, CA
Attendance: 10,791
Referees:
1. 55 Eric Brewton, #45 Tom Mauer, #9 Denise Brooks

Regular-season series

The regular season series was tied 2–2:

May 24, 2012

Report

Los Angeles Sparks 84, **Minnesota Lynx** **92**

Target Center, Minneapolis, MN

July 5, 2012

Report

Minnesota Lynx 90, **Los Angeles Sparks 96**

Staples Center, Los Angeles, CA

August 5, 2012

Report

Los Angeles Sparks 77, **Minnesota Lynx 88**

Target Center, Minneapolis, MN

September 20, 2012

Report

Minnesota Lynx 76, **Los Angeles Sparks 92**

Staples Center, Los Angeles, CA

== WNBA Finals ==
=== Minnesota Lynx vs. Indiana Fever ===
ESPN2

October 14
8:00pm ET

Report

**Indiana Fever** **76**, Minnesota Lynx 70
Scoring by quarter: **25**–20, 18–**20**, 13–**18**, **20**–12
Pts: Catchings (20); Rebs: Larkins (15); Asts: January (6)	Pts: Augustus (23); Rebs: Brunson, Moore (10); Asts: Whalen (4)
**Indiana lead series, 1–0**

Target Center, Minneapolis, MN
Attendance: 14,322
Referees:
1. 4 Sue Blauch, #18 Kurt Walker, #45 Tom Mauer

ESPN

October 17
8:00pm ET

Report

Indiana Fever 71, **Minnesota Lynx** **83**
Scoring by quarter: **18**–11, 15–**20**, 22–**29**, 16–**23**
Pts: Catchings (27); Rebs: Catchings (8); Asts: Phillips (4)	Pts: Augustus (27); Rebs: Brunson (7); Asts: McWilliams-Franklin, Moore, Whalen (4)
**Series tied 1–1**

Target Center, Minneapolis, MN
Attendance: 13,478
Referees:
1. 39 Michael Price, #42 Roy Gulbeyan, #43 Brenda Pantoja

ESPN2

October 19
8:00pm ET

Report

Minnesota Lynx 59, **Indiana Fever** **76**
Scoring by quarter: 16–**21**, 11–**24**, 11–**25**, **21**–6
Pts: Brunson (12); Rebs: Brunson (9); Asts: Wiggins (3)	Pts: Zellous (30); Rebs: Larkins (12); Asts: Davenport (4)
**Indiana lead series, 2–1**

Bankers Life Fieldhouse, Indianapolis, IN
Attendance: 18,165
Referees:
1. 9 Denise Brooks, #38 Lamont Simpson, #55 Eric Brewton

ESPN2

October 21
8:00pm ET

Report

Minnesota Lynx 78, **Indiana Fever** 87
Scoring by quarter: 18–**25**, **24**–22, 16–**18**, 20–**24**
Pts: Whalen (24); Rebs: Augustus (7); Asts: Whalen (8)	Pts: Catchings (28); Rebs: Larkins (13); Asts: Catchings (8)
**Indiana win series, 3–1**

Bankers Life Fieldhouse, Indianapolis, IN
Attendance: 15,213
Referees:
1. 4 Sue Blauch, #39 Michael Price, #42 Roy Gulbeyan

Regular-season series

The Minnesota Lynx won the season series 2–0:

September 14, 2012

Report

**Minnesota Lynx** **66**, Indiana Fever 64

Bankers Life Fieldhouse, Indianapolis, IN

September 17, 2012

Report

Indiana Fever 79, **Minnesota Lynx 86**

Target Center, Minneapolis, MN
