= Jamierra Faulkner =

American basketball player (born 1992)

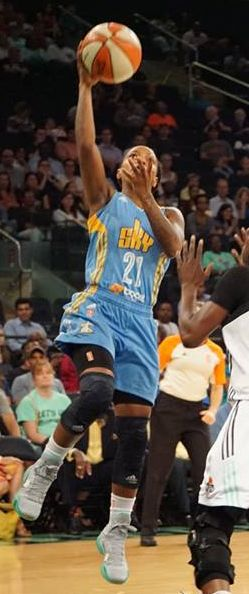

No. 21 – Chicago Sky
- Position: Point guard
- League: WNBA

Personal information
- Born: March 9, 1992 (age 34) West Palm Beach, Florida
- Listed height: 5 ft 6 in (1.68 m)
- Listed weight: 141 lb (64 kg)

Career information
- High school: Trinity Christian Academy (West Palm Beach, Florida)
- College: Southern Miss (2010–2014)
- WNBA draft: 2014: 3rd round, 34th overall pick
- Drafted by: Chicago Sky
- Playing career: 2014–2020

Career history
- 2014–2016: Chicago Sky
- 2014–2015: PINKK-Pécsi 424
- 2015–2016: Elitzur Holon
- 2016–2018: MBK Doğuş Hastanesi
- 2018: UMMC Ekaterinburg
- 2018–2020: Chicago Sky

Career highlights
- Gillom Trophy (2014); CUSA Defensive Player of the Year (2014); 2x CUSA All-Defensive Team (2013, 2014); 3x First-team All-CUSA (2012–2014); CUSA All-Freshman Team (2011); NCAA season assists leader (2014)
- Stats at WNBA.com
- Stats at Basketball Reference

Jamierra Faulkner (born March 9, 1992) is an American retired professional basketball player who played her entire career with the Chicago Sky of the Women's National Basketball Association (WNBA). She also played for UMMC Ekaterinburg. She was selected in the third round of the 2014 WNBA draft, 34th overall. She retired for medical reasons in 2021.

== College career ==
Faulkner played four years of basketball at Southern Miss.

== Career statistics ==
Legend
GP	Games played	GS	Games started	MPG	Minutes per game	RPG	Rebounds per game
APG	Assists per game	SPG	Steals per game	BPG	Blocks per game	PPG	Points per game
TO	Turnovers per game	FG%	Field-goal percentage	3P%	3-point field-goal percentage	FT%	Free-throw percentage
**Bold**	Career best	°	League leader

=== WNBA ===
==== Regular season ====
Year	Team	GP	GS	MPG	FG%	3P%	FT%	RPG	APG	SPG	BPG	TO	PPG
2014	Chicago	**34**	**18**	20.4	36.2	26.5	**83.8**	**2.0**	3.5	1.0	**0.2**	2.4	**7.9**
2015	Chicago	33	0	9.6	41.4	18.2	80.8	1.0	1.7	0.4	**0.2**	1.2	4.1
2016	Chicago	**34**	14	19.3	**42.5**	**33.3**	76.9	1.5	**4.6**	**1.1**	0.1	2.1	7.8
2017	Did not play (injury—ACL)												
2018	Chicago	17	0	**21.2**	34.3	30.2	75.0	1.4	3.9	0.5	0.1	2.1	7.6
2019	Chicago	13	0	5.5	33.3	11.1	50.0	0.3	0.8	0.2	0.0	**0.4**	1.3
Career	5 years, 1 team	131	32	16.0	38.6	28.2	78.8	1.4	3.1	0.7	0.2	1.8	6.2

==== Playoffs ====
Year	Team	GP	GS	MPG	FG%	3P%	FT%	RPG	APG	SPG	BPG	TO	PPG
2014	Chicago	**9**	0	5.9	36.8	0.0	**100.0**	0.4	0.6	0.0	0.0	0.4	2.2
2015	Chicago	3	0	6.0	16.7	0.0	50.0	1.0	1.7	0.0	0.0	**0.3**	1.7
2016	Chicago	5	0	**17.2**	39.5	14.3	69.2	1.6	**3.0**	**0.8**	0.0	1.4	**8.0**
2019	Chicago	1	0	6.0	**50.0**	**50.0**	0.0	**2.0**	2.0	0.0	0.0	1.0	3.0
Career	4 years, 1 team	18	0	9.1	35.2	14.3	69.6	0.9	1.5	0.2	0.0	0.7	3.8

=== College ===
Legend
GP	Games played	GS	Games started	MPG	Minutes per game
FG%	Field goal percentage	3P%	3-point field goal percentage	FT%	Free throw percentage
RPG	Rebounds per game	APG	Assists per game	SPG	Steals per game
BPG	Blocks per game	PPG	Points per game	**Bold**	Career high

Year	Team	GP	Points	FG%	3P%	FT%	RPG	APG	SPG	BPG	PPG
2010–11	Southern Miss.	30	366	39.3	23.8	64.9	3.7	5.9	2.4	0.3	12.2
2011–12	Southern Miss.	29	499	42.0	31.1	**71.4**	3.4	7.2	3.0	0.2	17.2
2012–13	Southern Miss.	31	590	43.0	25.2	69.5	**3.9**	6.6	**3.3**	0.2	**19.0**
2013–14	Southern Miss.	**34**	601	**47.6**	**33.9**	70.7	3.7	**8.6***	3.1	**0.4**	17.7
Career	Southern Miss.	124	2056	43.2	29.4	69.4	3.7	7.1	3.0	0.3	16.6
