= Gennifer Brandon =

American basketball player (born 1990)

Personal information
- Born: November 23, 1990 (age 35) Lynwood, California, U.S.
- Listed height: 6 ft 2 in (1.88 m)
- Listed weight: 164 lb (74 kg)

Career information
- High school: Chatsworth (Chatsworth, California)
- College: California (2009–2014)
- WNBA draft: 2014: 2nd round, 22nd overall pick
- Drafted by: Chicago Sky
- Playing career: 2014–present
- Position: Forward

Career history
- 2014–2015: Chicago Sky

Career highlights
- All-Pac 12 (2013); McDonald's All-American (2009)
- Stats at WNBA.com
- Stats at Basketball Reference

Gennifer Diane Brandon (born November 23, 1990) is an American former professional basketball player who played for the Chicago Sky of the Women's National Basketball Association (WNBA). She played college basketball at the University of California, Berkeley and attended Chatsworth High School in Chatsworth, California.

== Career statistics ==
=== WNBA career statistics ===
Legend
GP	Games played	GS	Games started	MPG	Minutes per game	RPG	Rebounds per game
APG	Assists per game	SPG	Steals per game	BPG	Blocks per game	PPG	Points per game
TO	Turnovers per game	FG%	Field-goal percentage	3P%	3-point field-goal percentage	FT%	Free-throw percentage
**Bold**	Career best	°	League leader

==== Regular season ====
Year	Team	GP	GS	MPG	FG%	3P%	FT%	RPG	APG	SPG	BPG	TO	PPG
2014	Chicago	16	2	7.6	33.3	0.0	46.2	2.6	0.2	0.2	0.4	0.6	1.8
Career	1 year, 1 team	16	2	7.6	33.3	0.0	46.2	2.6	0.2	0.2	0.4	0.6	1.8

==== Playoffs ====
Year	Team	GP	GS	MPG	FG%	3P%	FT%	RPG	APG	SPG	BPG	TO	PPG
2014	Chicago	2	0	2.0	0.0	0.0	100.0	1.0	0.5	0.0	0.0	0.0	1.0
Career	1 year, 1 team	2	0	2.0	0.0	0.0	100.0	1.0	0.5	0.0	0.0	0.0	1.0

=== College career statistics ===
Year	Team	GP	GS	MPG	FG%	3P%	FT%	RPG	APG	SPG	BPG	TO	PPG
2009–10	California	**35**	8	22.1	43.4	0.0	**67.8**	8.5	0.5	0.5	**0.9**	1.7	7.2
2010–11	Did not play due to injury												
2011–12	California	**35**	22	24.3	41.1	**50.0**	58.4	9.9	**0.7**	0.8	0.8	1.7	8.9
2012–13	California	**35**	**35**	**28.8**	**44.9**	0.0	62.7	**11.1**	0.5	**1.1**	0.8	1.7	**12.3**
2013–14	California	22	0	22.5	37.6	33.3	59.7	8.5	0.1	0.5	0.6	**1.2**	8.2
**Career**		127	65	24.6	42.3	33.3	62.0	9.6	0.5	0.8	0.8	1.6	9.2
Statistics retrieved from Sports-Reference.

== Professional career ==
Brandon was drafted by the Chicago Sky of the WNBA in the second round of the 2014 WNBA draft.
