= 2014 Chicago Sky season =

- Head coach: Pokey Chatman
- Arena: Allstate Arena

Results
- Record: 15–19 (.441)
- Place: 4th (Eastern)
- Playoff finish: Lost in WNBA Finals

Media
- Television: CN100; ESPN2, NBATV

The 2014 Chicago Sky season was the franchise's 9th season in the Women's National Basketball Association, and their fourth season under head coach Pokey Chatman. Coming off the franchise's first ever playoff appearance, the Sky looked to continue their success in the 2014 season.

The Sky's offseason included trading Swin Cash to Atlanta, signing free agent forward Jessica Breland, center Sasha Goodlett, but also learning that center Sylvia Fowles would be missing some time due to Arthroscopic surgery of the hip to repair a torn Labrum and Impingement.

Although the Sky finished the season with a 15–19 record, they placed 4th in the Eastern Conference and qualified for the playoffs. They defeated the Atlanta Dream and Indiana Fever in the playoffs and made it to the 2014 WNBA Finals, but lost the series in three games.

== Transactions ==
=== WNBA draft ===
Round	Pick	Player	Nationality	School/team/country
1	10	Markeisha Gatling	United States	North Carolina State
2	22	Gennifer Brandon	United States	California
3	34	Jamierra Faulkner	United States	Southern Mississippi

=== Trades and roster changes ===
Date	Transaction
January 15, 2014	Cored Swin Cash
March 25, 2014	Signed Allie Quigley and Avery Warley
March 27, 2014	Signed Jessica Breland
April 9, 2014	Signed Sasha Goodlett and Sequoia Holmes to training-camp contracts
April 10, 2014	Waived Carolyn Swords
April 17, 2014	Signed Markeisha Gatling, Gennifer Brandon, and Jamierra Faulkner to rookie-scale contracts
April 21, 2014	Signed Yvonne Turner and Aaryn Ellenberg to training-camp contracts
April 25, 2014	Signed Zhaque Gray and Destiny Williams to training-camp contracts
May 2, 2014	Waived Zhaque Gray
May 7, 2014	Signed and traded Swin Cash and a second round pick in the 2015 WNBA draft to the Atlanta Dream in exchange for Courtney Clements and a second round pick in the 2015 draft
May 12, 2014	Waived Avery Warley
May 14, 2014	Waived Sequoia Holmes and Destiny Williams
May 15, 2014	Temporarily suspend the contracts of Sylvia Fowles and Epiphanny Prince
May 22, 2014	Waived Aaryn Ellenberg
May 25, 2014	Activated Epiphanny Prince from her temporary suspension
June 24, 2014	Activated Sylvia Fowles from her temporary suspension

== Roster ==
2014 Chicago Sky roster
Players
Coaches

Pos.	No.	Nat.	Name	Height	Weight	DOB	From	Yrs
F	25	(United States)	Brandon, Gennifer	6' 2" (1.88m)	164 lb (74kg)	1990-11-23	California
F	51	(United States)	Breland, Jessica	6' 2" (1.88m)	166 lb (75kg)	1988-02-23	North Carolina
G	0	(United States)	Clements, Courtney	6' 0" (1.83m)	157 lb (71kg)	1989-11-12	San Diego State
G/F	11	(United States)	Delle Donne, Elena	6' 5" (1.96m)	187 lb (85kg)	1989-09-05	Delaware
G	21	(United States)	Faulkner, Jamierra	5' 6" (1.68m)	138 lb (63kg)	1992-03-09	Southern Miss
C	34	(United States)	Fowles, Sylvia	6' 6" (1.98m)	219 lb (99kg)	1985-10-06	LSU
C	9	(United States)	Gatling, Markeisha	6' 5" (1.96m)	195 lb (88kg)	1992-07-14	NC State
C	45	(United States)	Goodlett, Sasha	6' 5" (1.96m)	239 lb (108kg)	1990-08-09	Georgia Tech
G	10	(United States)	Prince, Epiphanny	5' 9" (1.75m)	179 lb (81kg)	1988-01-11	Rutgers
G	14	(United States)	Quigley, Allie	5' 10" (1.78m)	142 lb (64kg)	1986-06-20	DePaul	4
G	22	(United States)	Vandersloot, Courtney	5' 8" (1.73m)	137 lb (62kg)	1989-02-08	Gonzaga	2
F	1	(United States)	Young, Tamera	6' 2" (1.88m)	172 lb (78kg)	1986-10-30	James Madison	5

Head coach
(United States) Pokey Chatman (LSU)
Assistant coaches
(United States) Tree Rollins (Clemson)
(United States) Christie Sides (Louisiana Tech)
Athletic trainer
(United States) Natalie Meckstroth (Indiana)
Strength and conditioning coach
(United States) Ann Crosby (Western Michigan)

Legend

- (C) Team captain
- (DP) Unsigned draft pick
- (FA) Free agent
- (S) Suspended
- Injured

=== Depth ===
Pos.	Starter	Bench
C	Sylvia Fowles	Sasha Goodlett; Markeisha Gatling
PF	Elena Delle Donne	Jessica Breland; Gennifer Brandon
SF	Tamera Young	Courtney Clements
SG	Epiphanny Prince	Allie Quigley
PG	Courtney Vandersloot	Jamierra Faulkner

== Schedule ==
=== Preseason ===
2014 Preseason Schedule
Total: 2–1 (Home: 2–1; Road: 1–1)

Game	Date	Opponent	Score	High points	High rebounds	High assists	Location/Attendance	Record
1	May 9	Indiana	W 73-66	Jamierra Faulkner (11)	Jessica Breland (7)	Jamierra Faulkner (5)	HP Field House	1-0
2	May 11	Minnesota	L 76-67	Elena Delle Donne (15)	Gennifer Brandon (8)	Courtney Vandersloot (3)	HP Field House; 3,194	1-1
3	May 13	Washington	W 69-76	Elena Delle Donne (17)	Jessica Breland (9)	Courtney Vandersloot (11)	Bob Carpenter Center	2-1

2014 pre-season schedule

=== Regular season ===
2014 Regular Season Schedule
Total: 15–19 (Home: 9–8; Road: 6–11)
May: 5–1 (Home: 4–1; Road: 1–0)

Game	Date	Opponent	Score	High points	High rebounds	High assists	Location/Attendance	Record
1	May 16	Indiana	W 74-71	Elena Delle Donne (15)	Sasha Goodlett (10)	Courtney Vandersloot (5)	Allstate Arena; 6,721	1–0
2	May 17	@ New York	W 79-65	Elena Delle Donne (23)	Jessica Breland (11)	Courtney Vandersloot (8)	Madison Square Garden; 9,131	2–0
3	May 21	Connecticut	W 78-68	Elena Delle Donne (21)	Jessica Breland (15)	Courtney Vandersloot (7)	Allstate Arena; 4,951	3–0
4	May 23	Atlanta	W 87-73	Elena Delle Donne (27)	Jessica Breland (7)	Courtney Vandersloot (11)	Allstate Arena; 4,136	4–0
5	May 25	Minnesota	L 72-75	Delle Donne; Breland (16)	Jessica Breland (15)	Courtney Vandersloot (10)	Allstate Arena; 6,058	4–1
6	May 30	Connecticut	W 101-82	Elena Delle Donne (28)	Jessica Breland (10)	Courtney Vandersloot (13)	Allstate Arena; 5,693	5–1

June: 2–7 (Home: 1–4; Road: 1–3)

Game	Date	Opponent	Score	High points	High rebounds	High assists	Location/Attendance	Record
7	June 6	Los Angeles	L 88-102	Elena Delle Donne (33)	Elena Delle Donne (14)	Vandersloot; Faulkner (4)	Allstate Arena; 6,681	5–2
8	June 7	@ Atlanta	L 59-97	Allie Quigley (11)	Young; Brandon (6)	Courtney Vandersloot (7)	Philips Arena; 5,458	5–3
9	June 10	Seattle	L 76-80	Epiphanny Prince (18)	Markeisha Gatling (10)	Epiphanny Prince (6)	Allstate Arena; 3,958	5–4
10	June 13	@ Washington	L 68-79	Allie Quigley (18)	Sasha Goodlett (8)	Courtney Vandersloot (5)	Verizon Center; 7,198	5–5
11	June 18	New York	W 105-100 OT	Epiphanny Prince (30)	Tamera Young (12)	Courtney Vandersloot (8)	Allstate Arena; 6,716	6–5
12	June 20	Indiana	L 75-83	Epiphanny Prince (18)	Tamera Young (9)	Vandersloot; Faulkner (5)	Allstate Arena; 6,488	6–6
13	June 22	Tulsa	L 99-105 OT	Jessica Breland (26)	Jessica Breland (10)	Epiphanny Prince (8)	Allstate Arena; 6,711	6–7
14	June 25	@ Connecticut	L 69-79	Sylvia Fowles (17)	Sylvia Fowles (9)	Courtney Vandersloot (4)	Mohegan Sun Arena; 5,881	6–8
15	June 27	@ New York	W 73-69	Epiphanny Prince (30)	Tamera Young (5)	Epiphanny Prince (5)	Madison Square Garden; 7,911	7–8

July: 4–8 (Home: 2–2; Road: 2–6)

Game	Date	Opponent	Score	High points	High rebounds	High assists	Location/Attendance	Record
16	July 1	@ Los Angeles	W 90-83	Jamierra Faulkner (27)	Jessica Breland (11)	Prince; Breland; Quigley (4)	Staples Center; 7,201	8–8
17	July 2	@ Phoenix	L 69-87	Allie Quigley (16)	Sylvia Fowles (7)	Prince; Faulkner (4)	US Airways Center; 7,845	8–9
18	July 5	@ Seattle	L 73-80	Jessica Breland (20)	Sylvia Fowles (11)	Jamierra Faulkner (5)	KeyArena; 6,387	8–10
19	July 9	Washington	L 65-72	Sylvia Fowles (19)	Sylvia Fowles (17)	Jamierra Faulkner (6)	Allstate Arena; 16,402	8–11
20	July 11	Phoenix	L 66-72	Sylvia Fowles (23)	Sylvia Fowles (11)	Jamierra Faulkner (8)	Allstate Arena; 7,076	8–12
21	July 13	@ Atlanta	L 79-81 OT	Allie Quigley (27)	Sylvia Fowles (14)	Jamierra Faulkner (8)	McCamish Pavilion; 4,118	8–13
22	July 17	@ Indiana	L 64-82	Allie Quigley (17)	Sylvia Fowles (11)	Jessica Breland (3)	Bankers Life Fieldhouse; 8,333	8–14
23	July 22	Indiana	W 60-57	Sylvia Fowles (21)	Sylvia Fowles (10)	Jamierra Faulkner (6)	Allstate Arena; 5,891	9–14
24	July 25	@ Atlanta	W 79-75	Epiphanny Prince (21)	Sylvia Fowles (12)	Epiphanny Prince (7)	McCamish Pavilion; 4,544	10–14
25	July 27	@ Tulsa	L 69-79	Prince; Quigley (14)	Fowles; Breland (9)	Prince; Faulkner; Fowles; Quigley (3)	BOK Center; 5,540	10–15
26	July 29	@ San Antonio	L 74-92	Epiphanny Prince (23)	Fowles; Prince (5)	Faulkner; Breland (4)	AT&T Center; 8,986	10–16
27	July 31	New York	W 87-74	Fowles; Quigley (16)	Sylvia Fowles (14)	Faulkner; Prince (7)	Allstate Arena; 6,043	11–16

August: 4–3 (Home: 2–1; Road: 2–2)

Game	Date	Opponent	Score	High points	High rebounds	High assists	Location/Attendance	Record
28	August 3	Washington	W 76-65	Elena Delle Donne (21)	Sylvia Fowles (11)	Epiphanny Prince (7)	Allstate Arena; 6,107	12–16
29	August 5	@ Connecticut	W 82-66	Epiphanny Prince (20)	Sylvia Fowles (12)	Epiphanny Prince (6)	Mohegan Sun Arena; 5,343	13–16
30	August 7	@ Minnesota	L 64-74	Allie Quigley (20)	Jessica Breland (9)	Jamierra Faulkner (6)	Target Center; 9,222	13–17
31	August 10	Atlanta	W 80-69	Allie Quigley (17)	Sylvia Fowles (15)	Jamierra Faulkner (6)	Allstate Arena; 6,021	14–17
32	August 13	@ Washington	W 72-69	Sylvia Fowles (21)	Sylvia Fowles (16)	Allie Quigley (6)	Verizon Center; 16,117	15–17
33	August 16	@ Indiana	L 67-71	Allie Quigley (17)	Fowles; Delle Donne (7)	Epiphanny Prince (4)	Bankers Life Fieldhouse; 10,625	15–18
34	August 17	San Antonio	L 72-84	Courtney Clements (17)	Gennifer Brandon (10)	Courtney Vandersloot (4)	Allstate Arena; 7,987	15–19

2014 season schedule

=== Playoffs ===
2014 Playoff Schedule
Conference Semifinals vs. Atlanta (Won Series 2-1)

Game	Date	Opponent	Score	High points	High rebounds	High assists	Location/Attendance	Record
1	August 22	@ Atlanta	W 80-77	Elena Delle Donne (21)	Sylvia Fowles (14)	Vandersloot; Prince (7)	Philips Arena; 5,985	1–0
2	August 24	Atlanta	L 83-92	Elena Delle Donne (22)	Fowles; Delle Donne (6)	Courtney Vandersloot (8)	Allstate Arena; 4,546	1–1
3	August 26	@ Atlanta	W 81-80	Elena Delle Donne (34)	Sylvia Fowles (15)	Vandersloot; Young (5)	Philips Arena; 4,829	2–1

Conference Finals vs. Indiana (Won Series 2-1)

Game	Date	Opponent	Score	High points	High rebounds	High assists	Location/Attendance	Record
1	August 30	@ Indiana	L 70-77	Sylvia Fowles (20)	Sylvia Fowles (14)	Courtney Vandersloot (4)	Bankers Life Fieldhouse; 7,557	0–1
2	September 1	Indiana	W 86-84	Sylvia Fowles (27)	Tamera Young (9)	Vandersloot; Prince; Quigley (5)	Allstate Arena; 6,019	1–1
3	September 3	@ Indiana	W 75-62	Allie Quigley (24)	Sylvia Fowles (7)	Courtney Vandersloot (9)	Bankers Life Fieldhouse; 7,705	2–1

WNBA Finals vs. Phoenix (Lost Series 0-3)

Game	Date	Opponent	Score	High points	High rebounds	High assists	Location/Attendance	Record
1	September 7	@ Phoenix	L 62-83	Sylvia Fowles (19)	Sylvia Fowles (11)	Courtney Vandersloot (5)	US Airways Center; 13,263	0–1
2	September 7	@ Phoenix	L 68-97	Elena Delle Donne (22)	Sylvia Fowles (5)	Courtney Vandersloot (4)	US Airways Center; 13,348	0–2
3	September 12	Phoenix	L 82-87	Elena Delle Donne (23)	Sylvia Fowles (8)	Courtney Vandersloot (11)	UIC Pavilion; 7,365	0–3

2014 season schedule

== Standings ==
#	Eastern Conference					
#	Team	W	L	PCT	GB	GP
1	y- Atlanta Dream	19	15	.559	-	34
2	x- Indiana Fever	16	18	.471	3.0	34
3	x-Washington Mystics	16	18	.471	3.0	34
4	x-Chicago Sky	15	19	.441	4.0	34
5	e-New York Liberty	15	19	.441	4.0	34
6	e-Connecticut Sun	13	21	.382	6.0	34

== Playoffs ==
**Conference semifinals** Best-of-3
E1	Atlanta	1
E4	**Chicago**	**2**
**Eastern Conference**
E2	**Indiana**	**2**
E3	Washington	0
W1	**Phoenix**	**2**
W4	Los Angeles	0
**Western Conference**
W2	**Minnesota**	**2**
W3	San Antonio	0

**Conference finals** Best-of-3
E4	**Chicago**	**2**
E2	Indiana	1
W1	**Phoenix**	**2**
W2	Minnesota	1

**WNBA Finals**; Best-of-5
E4	Chicago	0
W1	**Phoenix**	**3**

- **Bold** – Series winner
- Italics – Team with home-court advantage

== Statistics ==
Legend
GP	Games played	GS	Games started	MPG	Minutes per game	RPG	Rebounds per game
APG	Assists per game	SPG	Steals per game	BPG	Blocks per game	PPG	Points per game
FG%	Field-goal percentage	3P%	3-point field-goal percentage	FT%	Free-throw percentage	TO	Turnovers per game
PF	Fouls per game		Team leader		League leader

=== Regular season ===
Player	GP	GS	MPG	FG%	3P%	FT%	RPG	APG	SPG	BPG	PPG
Elena Delle Donne	16	9	25.5	42.9	36.4	93.3	4.0	1.1	0.6	1.5	17.9
Epiphanny Prince	26	24	32.3	38.3	32.7	87.6	3.0	3.8	1.9	0.4	15.0
Sylvia Fowles	20	18	29.8	54.6	0.0	78.3	10.2	0.6	1.4	2.1	13.4
Allie Quigley	34	1	24.8	44.4	38.7	87.9	2.2	1.9	0.7	0.2	11.2
Jessica Breland	32	32	26.5	46.1	0.0	75.9	6.8	1.9	0.9	1.8	9.7
Jamierra Faulkner	34	18	20.4	36.2	26.5	83.8	2.0	3.5	1.0	0.2	7.9
Courtney Vandersloot	18	16	25.1	40.2	37.5	83.3	2.2	5.6	1.2	0.5	6.8
Tamera Young	34	33	27.6	43.8	0.0	55.6	5.1	1.2	0.7	0.1	6.7
Markeisha Gatling	29	1	11.0	64.8	0.0	72.7	2.4	0.0	0.1	0.4	3.7
Sasha Goodlett	34	15	12.9	45.4	0.0	72.2	2.3	0.3	0.3	0.5	3.4
Courtney Clements	33	1	11.4	36.4	17.4	100.0	1.7	0.7	0.4	0.1	2.7
Gennifer Brandon	16	2	7.6	33.3	0.0	46.2	2.6	0.2	0.2	0.4	1.8
Aaryn Ellenberg	2	0	0.5	0.0	0.0	0.0	0.0	0.0	0.0	0.0	0.0

=== Playoffs ===
Player	GP	GS	MPG	FG%	3P%	FT%	RPG	APG	SPG	BPG	PPG
Elena Delle Donne	9	9	31.0	48.2	37.9	91.9	3.3	1.6	0.3	1.6	16.8
Sylvia Fowles	9	9	36.2	53.8	0.0	77.3	9.7	0.2	1.7	1.6	16.2
Allie Quigley	9	0	25.7	41.2	34.2	89.7	2.7	2.1	0.3	0.6	14.2
Epiphanny Prince	9	9	29.1	29.6	27.3	80.0	3.4	2.1	1.6	0.8	9.2
Tamera Young	9	9	29.8	43.1	0.0	52.4	4.2	1.4	0.7	0.4	7.4
Courtney Vandersloot	9	9	29.8	38.3	13.3	85.0	2.3	6.4	1.3	0.2	7.2
Jessica Breland	7	0	13.0	38.1	0.0	0.0	4.0	1.0	0.1	0.6	2.3
Jamierra Faulkner	9	0	5.9	36.8	0.0	100.0	0.4	0.6	0.0	0.0	2.2
Markeisha Gatling	5	0	4.2	60.0	0.0	0.0	0.6	0.0	0.0	0.0	1.2
Gennifer Brandon	2	0	2.0	0.0	0.0	100.0	1.0	0.5	0.0	0.0	1.0
Sasha Goodlett	7	0	4.1	25.0	0.0	50.0	0.7	0.0	0.3	0.0	0.4
Courtney Clements	5	0	4.0	0.0	0.0	0.0	0.2	0.0	0.0	0.0	0.0

== Awards and honors ==
Recipient	Award	Date awarded	Ref.
Elena Delle Donne	Eastern Conference Player of the Week	May 28	
Elena Delle Donne	Eastern Conference Player of the Month - May	May	
Elena Delle Donne	WNBA All-Star Starter	July 8	
Jessica Breland	WNBA All-Star Selection	July 15	
Allie Quigley	Eastern Conference Player of the Week	August 11	
Allie Quigley	WNBA Sixth Woman of the Year	August 24	
Sylvia Fowles	All-Defensive Second Team	August 22	
