= 2014 WNBA playoffs =

Professional women's basketball tournament

- Dates: August 21 – September 12, 2014

Final positions
- Champions: Phoenix Mercury
- Runners-up: Chicago Sky

Tournament statistics
- Attendance: 8,200 per game
- Scoring leader (s): Diana Taurasi (Phoenix) (21.9 PPG)

Awards
- MVP: Diana Taurasi (Phoenix)

The 2014 WNBA playoffs was the postseason for the 2014 WNBA season. Four teams from each of the league's two conferences qualified for the playoffs, seeded 1 to 4 in a tournament bracket, with the two opening rounds in a best-of-three format, and the final in a best-of-five format.

The Phoenix Mercury won the 2014 WNBA Finals, sweeping the Chicago Sky in three games. The Mercury defeated the Los Angeles Sparks in the conference semifinals before defeating the Minnesota Lynx in the Western Conference Finals. The Mercury lost only one game in the entire playoffs.

The Chicago Sky attempted to complete a cinderella run by upsetting the Atlanta Dream in the conference semifinals and by upsetting the Indiana Fever in the Eastern Conference Finals, both in three games. However, the Sky were unable to complete their historic playoff run, as the Mercury won their third WNBA championship title.

== Tiebreak procedures ==
=== Two-team tie ===
1. Better record in head-to-head games.
2. Better winning percentage within own conference.
3. Better winning percentage against all teams with .500 or better record at the end of the season.
4. Better point differential in games head-to-head.
5. Coin toss.

=== Three or more-team tie ===
1. Better winning percentage among all head-to-head games involving tied teams.
2. Better winning percentage against teams within conference (for first two rounds of playoffs) or better record against teams in the opposite conference (for Finals).
3. Better winning percentage against all teams with a .500 or better record at the end of the season.
4. Better point differential in games involving tied teams.
5. Coin toss.

== Playoff qualifying ==
=== Eastern Conference ===
Seed	Team	Record	Clinched		
Seed	Team	Record	Playoff berth	Best record in Conference	Best record in WNBA
1	Atlanta Dream	19–15	August 2	August 13	—
2	Indiana Fever	16–18 (Note: Indiana Fever clinched #2 seed over Washington Mystics based on Eastern Conference winning percentage. (.545 vs .500))	August 14	—	—
3	Washington Mystics	16–18	August 15	—	—
4	Chicago Sky	15–19 (Note: Chicago Sky clinched #4 seed over New York Liberty based on a 4–0 regular season series record.)	August 15	—	—

=== Western Conference ===
Seed	Team	Record	Clinched		
Seed	Team	Record	Playoff berth	Best record in Conference	Best record in WNBA
1	Phoenix Mercury	29–5	July 22	August 12	August 12
2	Minnesota Lynx	25–9	July 24	—	—
3	San Antonio Stars	16–18 (Note: San Antonio Stars clinched #3 seed over Los Angeles Sparks based on a 3–1 regular season series record.)	August 15	—	—
4	Los Angeles Sparks	16–18	August 12	—	—

== Bracket ==
**Conference semifinals** Best-of-3
E1	Atlanta	1
E4	**Chicago**	**2**
**Eastern Conference**
E2	**Indiana**	**2**
E3	Washington	0
W1	**Phoenix**	**2**
W4	Los Angeles	0
**Western Conference**
W2	**Minnesota**	**2**
W3	San Antonio	0

**Conference finals** Best-of-3
E4	**Chicago**	**2**
E2	Indiana	1
W1	**Phoenix**	**2**
W2	Minnesota	1

**WNBA Finals**; Best-of-5
E4	Chicago	0
W1	**Phoenix**	**3**

- **Bold** – Series winner
- Italics – Team with home-court advantage

== Eastern Conference ==
=== Conference semifinals ===
==== (1) Atlanta Dream vs. (4) Chicago Sky ====
NBATV

August 22
7:30pm ET

Game 1

**Chicago Sky** **80**, Atlanta Dream 77
Scoring by quarter: 18–**23**, **18**–14, 21–21, **23**–19
Pts: Delle Donne (21); Rebs: Fowles (14); Asts: Prince, Vandersloot (7)	Pts: McCoughtry (24); Rebs: Lyttle (14); Asts: Schimmel (6)

Philips Arena, Atlanta, GA
Attendance: 5,985
Referees:
#11 Lauren Holtkamp
#21 Byron Jarrett
#38 Lamont Simpson

ESPN2

August 24
7:00pm ET

Game 2

**Atlanta Dream** **92**, Chicago Sky 83
Scoring by quarter: **24**–22, 20–**21**, **24**–18, **24**–22
Pts: McCoughtry (39); Rebs: Lyttle, Thomas (7); Asts: Thomas (6)	Pts: Delle Donne (22); Rebs: Delle Donne, Fowles (6); Asts: Vandersloot (8)

Allstate Arena, Rosemont, IL
Attendance: 4,546
Referees:
#4 Sue Blauch
#9 Denise Brooks
#42 Roy Gulbeyan

NBATV

August 26
7:30pm ET

Game 3

**Chicago Sky** **81**, Atlanta Dream 80
Scoring by quarter: 17–**30**, 24–24, 10–**13**, **30**–13
Pts: Delle Donne (34); Rebs: Fowles (15); Asts: Vandersloot, Young (5)	Pts: de Souza (18); Rebs: Lyttle (13); Asts: Schimmel (6)
**Chicago won the series, 2–1**

Philips Arena, Atlanta, GA
Attendance: 4,829
Referees:
#31 Amy Bonner
#39 Michael Price
#55 Eric Brewton

Regular-season series

Chicago won the regular-season series 3–2:

May 24, 2014

Report

Atlanta Dream 73, **Chicago Sky** 87

Allstate Arena, Rosemont, IL

June 7, 2014

Report

Chicago Sky 59, **Atlanta Dream** 97

Philips Arena, Atlanta, GA

July 13, 2014

Report

Chicago Sky 79, **Atlanta Dream** 81 (OT)

Hank McCamish Pavilion, Atlanta, GA

July 25, 2014

Report

**Chicago Sky** 79, Atlanta Dream 75

Hank McCamish Pavilion, Atlanta, GA

August 10, 2014

Report

Atlanta Dream 69, **Chicago Sky** 80

Allstate Arena, Rosemont, IL

==== (2) Indiana Fever vs. (3) Washington Mystics ====
ESPN2

August 21
7:00pm ET

Game 1

Washington Mystics 73, **Indiana Fever** **78**
Scoring by quarter: 13–**22**, **23**–8, 14–**17**, 23–**31**
Pts: Latta (22); Rebs: Vaughn (8); Asts: Latta (5)	Pts: Catchings (22); Rebs: Larkins (11); Asts: Catchings, Christmas, January, Zellous (2)

Bankers Life Fieldhouse, Indianapolis, IN
Attendance: 5,576
Referees:
#8 Daryl Humphrey
#9 Denise Brooks
#45 Tom Mauer

ESPN2

August 23
5:00pm ET

Game 2

**Indiana Fever** **81**, Washington Mystics 76 (OT)
Scoring by quarter: **16**–12, 14–**15**, 21–**26**, **15**–13, Overtime: **15**–10
Pts: Catchings (26); Rebs: Catchings, Larkins (11); Asts: January (7)	Pts: Lawson (20); Rebs: Meesseman (10); Asts: Hartley (5)
**Indiana won the series, 2–0**

Verizon Center, Washington, D.C.
Attendance: 6,124
Referees:
#13 Cameron Inouye
#24 Tony Dawkins
#55 Eric Brewton

Regular-season series

The regular season series was tied 2–2:

May 23, 2014

Report

**Washington Mystics** 79, Indiana Fever 63

Bankers Life Fieldhouse, Indianapolis, IN

June 6, 2014

Report

**Indiana Fever** 64, Washington Mystics 61

Verizon Center, Washington, D.C.

July 2, 2014

Report

**Indiana Fever** 80, Washington Mystics 77

Verizon Center, Washington, D.C.

August 8, 2014

Report

**Atlanta Dream** 74, Indiana Fever 61

Bankers Life Fieldhouse, Indianapolis, IN

=== Conference finals ===
==== (2) Indiana Fever vs. (4) Chicago Sky ====
NBATV

August 30
7:00pm ET

Game 1

Chicago Sky 70, **Indiana Fever** **77**
Scoring by quarter: 18–**21**, 15–**21**, 15–**1 8**, **22**–17
Pts: Fowles (20); Rebs: Fowles (14); Asts: Vandersloot (4)	Pts: January (19); Rebs: Larkins (8); Asts: Catchings (4)

Bankers Life Fieldhouse, Indianapolis, IN
Attendance: 7,557
Referees:
#9 Denise Brooks
#34 Maj Forsberg
#42 Roy Gulbeyan

NBATV

September 1
4:00pm ET

Game 2

Indiana Fever 84, **Chicago Sky** **86** (2OT)
Scoring by quarter: **18**–16, **21**–15, 13–**17**, 19–**23**, Overtime: 8–8, 5–**7**
Pts: Zellous (20); Rebs: Catchings (14); Asts: January (6)	Pts: Fowles (27); Rebs: Young (9); Asts: Prince, Quigley, Vandersloot (5)

Allstate Arena, Rosemont, IL
Attendance: 6,019
Referees:
#11 Lauren Holtkamp
#13 Cameron Inouye
#18 Kurt Walker

NBATV

September 3
7:00pm ET

Game 3

**Chicago Sky** **75**, Indiana Fever 62
Scoring by quarter: **15**–11, **22**–18, 15–**16**, **23**–17
Pts: Quigley (24); Rebs: Fowles (7); Asts: Vandersloot (9)	Pts: Zellous (16); Rebs: Larkins (11); Asts: Catchings, January (3)
**Chicago won the series, 2–1**

Bankers Life Fieldhouse, Indianapolis, IN
Attendance: 7,705
Referees:
#4 Sue Blauch
#45 Tom Mauer
#55 Eric Brewton

Regular-season series

Indiana won the regular season series 3–2:

May 16, 2014

Report

Indiana Fever 71, **Chicago Sky** 74

Allstate Arena, Rosemont, IL

June 20, 2014

Report

**Indiana Fever** 83, Chicago Sky 75

Allstate Arena, Rosemont, IL

July 17, 2015

Report

Chicago Sky 64, **Indiana Fever** 82

Bankers Life Fieldhouse, Indianapolis, IN

July 22, 2014

Report

Indiana Fever 57, **Chicago Sky** 60

Allstate Arena, Rosemont, IL

August 16, 2014

Report

Chicago Sky 67, **Indiana Fever** 71

Bankers Life Fieldhouse, Indianapolis, IN

== Western Conference ==
=== Conference semifinals ===
==== (1) Phoenix Mercury vs. (4) Los Angeles Sparks ====
NBATV

August 22
10:00pm ET

Game 1

Los Angeles Sparks 72, **Phoenix Mercury** **75**
Scoring by quarter: 12–**13**, 22–22, 19–**21**, 19–19
Pts: Parker (22); Rebs: Lavender, Parker (7); Asts: Parker, Toliver (4)	Pts: Taurasi (34); Rebs: Dupree, Griner (7); Asts: Taylor (7)

US Airways Center, Phoenix, AZ
Attendance: 11,591
Referees:
#4 Sue Blauch
#30 Thomas Nunez
#35 Billy Smith

ESPN2

August 24
9:00pm ET

Game 2

**Phoenix Mercury** **93**, Los Angeles Sparks 68
Scoring by quarter: **30**–14, **22**–19, **23**–18, **18**–17
Pts: Griner (21); Rebs: Dupree (8); Asts: Phillips, Taurasi (7)	Pts: Parker (21); Rebs: Ogwumike (6); Asts: Toliver (9)
**Phoenix won the series, 2–0**

Staples Center, Los Angeles, CA
Attendance: 7,449
Referees:
#34 Maj Forsberg
#39 Michael Price
#62 Jeff Wooten

Regular-season series

Phoenix won the regular-season series 5–0:

May 18, 2014

Report

**Phoenix Mercury** 74, Los Angeles Sparks 69

Staples Center, Los Angeles, CA

July 6, 2014

Report

**Phoenix Mercury** 94, Los Angeles Sparks 89

Staples Center, Los Angeles, CA

July 24, 2014

Report

**Phoenix Mercury** 93, Los Angeles Sparks 73

Staples Center, Los Angeles, CA

July 29, 2014

Report

Los Angeles Sparks 69, **Phoenix Mercury** 90

US Airways Center, Phoenix, AZ

August 16, 2014

Report

Los Angeles Sparks 69, **Phoenix Mercury** 76

US Airways Center, Phoenix, AZ

==== (2) Minnesota Lynx vs. (3) San Antonio Stars ====
ESPN2

August 21
9:00pm ET

Game 1

San Antonio Stars 84, **Minnesota Lynx** **88**
Scoring by quarter: 16–**24**, 14–**16**, 23–**25**, **31**–23
Pts: McBride (20); Rebs: Adams (10); Asts: Robinson (6)	Pts: Moore (26); Rebs: Brunson, Whalen (7); Asts: Whalen (11)

Target Center, Minneapolis, MN
Attendance: 8,523
Referees:
#34 Maj Forsberg
#39 Michael Price
#53 Jeff Smith

ESPN2

August 23
7:00pm ET

Game 2

**Minnesota Lynx** **94**, San Antonio Stars 89
Scoring by quarter: 12–**28**, **28**–16, **27**–20, **27**–25
Pts: Whalen (31); Rebs: Moore (8); Asts: Moore (10)	Pts: McBride (25); Rebs: Appel (8); Asts: Robinson (6)
**Minnesota won the series, 2–0**

AT&T Center, San Antonio, TX
Attendance: 7,085
Referees:
#8 Daryl Humphrey
#18 Kurt Walker
#31 Amy Bonner

Regular-season series

Minnesota won the regular-season series 4–1:

May 30, 2014

Report

San Antonio Stars 72, **Minnesota Lynx** 88

Target Center, Minneapolis, MN

June 1, 2014

Report

**Minnesota Lynx** 87, San Antonio Stars 79

AT&T Center, San Antonio, TX

July 3, 2014

Report

San Antonio Stars 84, **Minnesota Lynx** 91

Target Center, Minneapolis, MN

July 25, 2014

Report

San Antonio Stars 78, **Minnesota Lynx** 88

Target Center, Minneapolis, MN

August 15, 2014

Report

Minnesota Lynx 76, San Antonio Stars 92

AT&T Center, San Antonio, TX

=== Conference finals ===
==== (1) Phoenix Mercury vs. (2) Minnesota Lynx ====
NBA TV

August 29
10:00pm ET

Game 1

Minnesota Lynx 71, **Phoenix Mercury** **85**
Scoring by quarter: 20–**23**, 11–**19**, 16–**25**, **24**–18
Pts: Whalen (25); Rebs: Brunson (8); Asts: Brunson, Moore (3)	Pts: Griner (23); Rebs: Taylor (13); Asts: Taylor (7)

US Airways Center, Phoenix, AZ
Attendance: 10,376
Referees:
#4 Sue Blauch
#39 Michael Price
#45 Tom Mauer

ABC

August 31
3:30pm ET

Game 2

Phoenix Mercury 77, **Minnesota Lynx** **82**
Scoring by quarter: **22**–9, 22–**27**, 18–**20**, 15–**26**
Pts: Taurasi (23); Rebs: Dupree (9); Asts: Taurasi (5)	Pts: Moore (32); Rebs: Brunson (10); Asts: Whalen (7)

Target Center, Minneapolis, MN
Attendance: 10,513
Referees:
#31 Amy Bonner
#38 Lamont Simpson
#55 Eric Brewton

NBATV

September 2
10:00pm ET

Game 3

Minnesota Lynx 78, **Phoenix Mercury** **96**
Scoring by quarter: 21–**28**, 21–**22**, **25**–22, 11–**24**
Pts: Augustus (21); Rebs: Brunson (8); Asts: Whalen (6)	Pts: Taurasi (22); Rebs: Bonner (7); Asts: Taurasi (7)
**Phoenix won the series, 2–1**

US Airways Center, Phoenix, AZ
Attendance: 9,749
Referees:
#9 Denise Brooks
#39 Michael Price
#42 Roy Gulbeyan

Regular-season series

Phoenix won the regular-season series 3–1:

June 15, 2014

Report

**Phoenix Mercury** 80, Minnesota Lynx 72

Target Center, Minneapolis, MN

June 18, 2014

Report

Minnesota Lynx 79, **Phoenix Mercury** 92

US Airways Center, Phoenix, AZ

July 31, 2014

Report

Phoenix Mercury 67, **Minnesota Lynx** 75

Target Center, Minneapolis, MN

August 9, 2014

Report

Minnesota Lynx 80, **Phoenix Mercury** 82

US Airways Center, Phoenix, AZ

== WNBA Finals ==
=== Phoenix Mercury vs. Chicago Sky ===
ABC

September 7
3:30pm ET

Report

Chicago Sky 62, **Phoenix Mercury** **83**
Scoring by quarter: 8–**15**, 12–**27**, 14–14, **28**–27
Pts: Fowles (19); Rebs: Fowles (11); Asts: Vandersloot (5)	Pts: Dupree (26); Rebs: Griner (7); Asts: Taurasi (11)

US Airways Center, Phoenix, AZ
Attendance: 13,263
Referees:
#31 Amy Bonner
#38 Lamont Simpson
#42 Roy Gulbeyan

ESPN

September 9
9:00pm ET

Report

Chicago Sky 68, **Phoenix Mercury** **97**
Scoring by quarter: 14–**21**, 22–**30**, 15–**23**, 17–**23**
Pts: Delle Donne (22); Rebs: Fowles (5); Asts: Vandersloot (4)	Pts: Griner (19); Rebs: Taylor (8); Asts: Taylor (6)

US Airways Center, Phoenix, AZ
Attendance: 13,348
Referees:
#4 Sue Blauch
#18 Kurt Walker
#55 Eric Brewton

ESPN2

September 12
8:00pm ET

Report

**Phoenix Mercury** **87**, Chicago Sky 82
Scoring by quarter: 22–22, **23**–21, 16–**20**, **26**–19
Pts: Dupree, Taurasi (24); Rebs: Bonner (9); Asts: Dupree (6)	Pts: Delle Donne (23); Rebs: Fowles (8); Asts: Vandersloot (11)
**Phoenix wins series, 3–0**

UIC Pavilion, Chicago, IL
Attendance: 7,365
Referees:
#9 Denise Brooks
#34 Maj Forsberg
#39 Michael Price

Regular-season series

Phoenix won the regular-season series 2–0:

July 2, 2014

Report

Chicago Sky 69, **Phoenix Mercury** **87**

US Airways Center, Phoenix, AZ

July 11, 2014

Report

**Phoenix Mercury** **72**, Chicago Sky 66

Allstate Arena, Rosemont, IL
