= Epiphanny Prince =

American basketball player (born 1988)

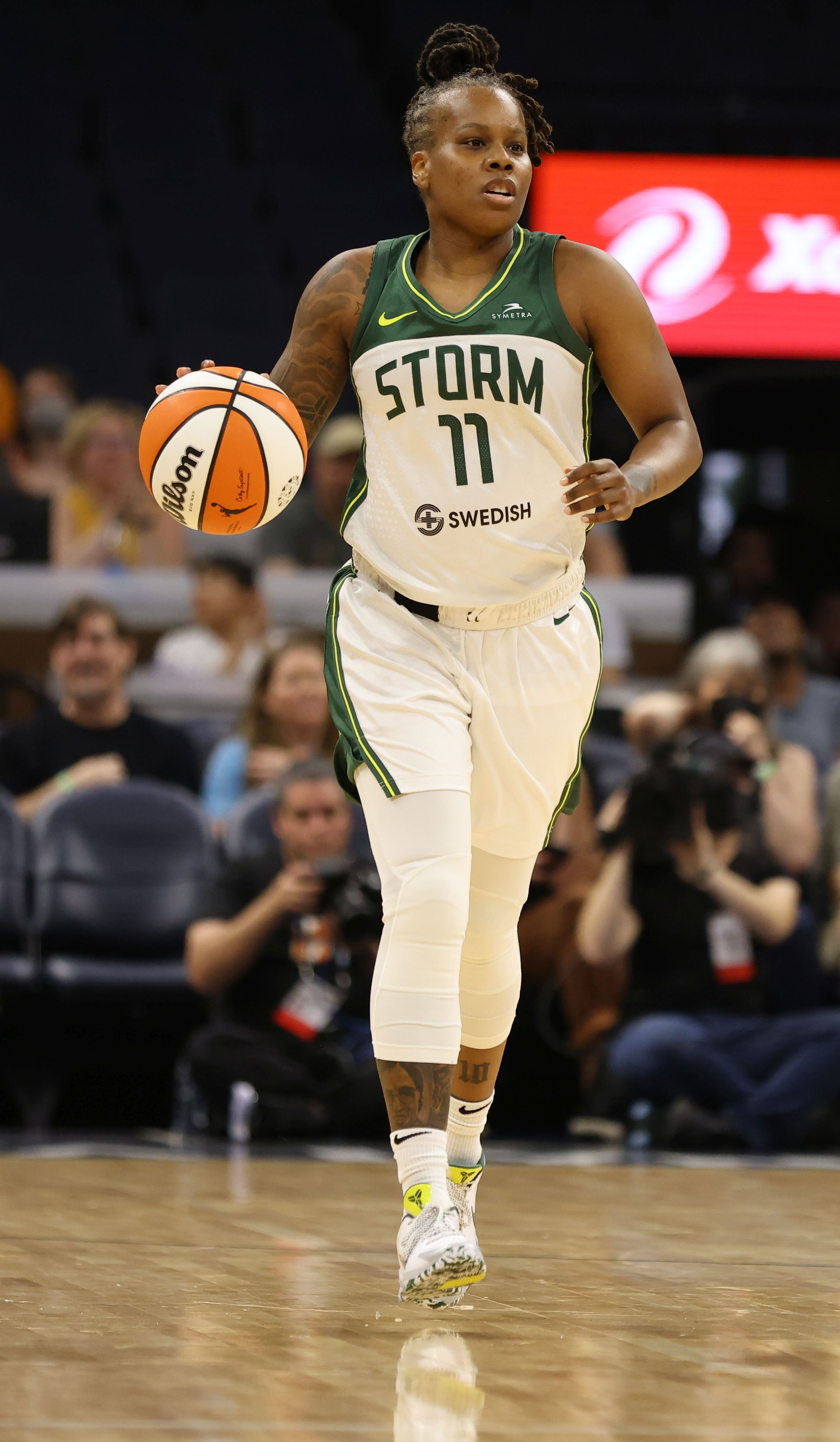
- Prince with the Seattle Storm in 2022

New York Liberty
- Positions: Director of Player & Community Engagement
- League: WNBA

Personal information
- Born: January 11, 1988 (age 38) New York City, New York, U.S.
- Listed height: 5 ft 9 in (1.75 m)
- Listed weight: 179 lb (81 kg)

Career information
- High school: Murry Bergtraum (New York City, New York)
- College: Rutgers (2006–2009)
- WNBA draft: 2010: 1st round, 4th overall pick
- Drafted by: Chicago Sky
- Playing career: 2009–2023

Career history
- 2009: Spartak Moscow
- 2009–2010: Botaş Spor
- 2010–2014: Chicago Sky
- 2011–2012: Galatasaray
- 2012–2020: Dynamo Kursk
- 2015–2018: New York Liberty
- 2019: Las Vegas Aces
- 2020–2022: Seattle Storm
- 2021: Galatasaray
- 2021–2022: Dynamo Kursk
- 2022: Hatayspor
- 2022–2023: Galatasaray

Career highlights
- WNBA Champion (2020); 2× WNBA All-Star (2011, 2013); All-WNBA Second Team (2015); Commissioner’s Cup champion (2021); 2× Third-team All-American – AP (2008, 2009); Big East Most Improved Player (2008); 2× First-team All-Big East (2008, 2009); Big East All-Freshman Team (2007); McDonald's All-American (2006)
- Stats at WNBA.com
- Stats at Basketball Reference

Epiphanny Prince (born January 11, 1988) is a Russian-American former professional basketball player.

She is best known for scoring 113 points for Murry Bergtraum in a high-school game in 2006, breaking a girls' national prep record previously held by Hall of Famer Cheryl Miller. She participated in the 2006 Women's Basketball Coaches Association (WBCA) and McD's High School All-America Games.

== Career ==
=== Overseas ===
In June 2009, Prince announced plans to leave Rutgers after only three years to play professional basketball in Europe for a year. According to The New York Times, Prince was only 10 units from earning a degree in criminal justice and African-American studies and planned to complete her degree during the summer of 2009. Her announcement was not binding until she signed with an agent; in August, Prince signed with Wasserman Media Group. Prince initially joined Russian team Spartak Moscow, then Turkish team Botaş Spor, before the 2010 WNBA draft.

In 2015, Prince moved to Dynamo Kursk in the European League. Their team won the 2017 Euroleague.

On December 31, 2022, she signed with Galatasaray of the Turkish Women's Basketball Super League (TKBL).

As of July 2023, her contract had expired. Galatasaray club said "see you on the other side" to the player on July 6, 2023 by publishing a sarcastic bite-away message.

=== WNBA career ===
On February 16, 2015, the Chicago Sky traded Prince to the New York Liberty for Cappie Pondexter.

In 2019, Prince was signed as a late season addition to the Las Vegas Aces.

Over her WNBA career, she averaged 22.7 minutes per game, 37.6% on three-point field goals and 10.7 PPG.

=== National team career ===
In 2010, she was granted Russian citizenship. She was not on the roster during the 2011 European Championships, nor did she compete for Russia during the 2012 Olympics in London.

Prince played as a point guard for the Russian national team in the European Championships of 2013, where the team finished in 13th place.

=== Post-Retirement ===
After retiring from the court, Prince serves as Director of Player and Community Engagement for the New York Liberty.

== Career statistics ==
Legend
GP	Games played	GS	Games started	MPG	Minutes per game	RPG	Rebounds per game
APG	Assists per game	SPG	Steals per game	BPG	Blocks per game	PPG	Points per game
TO	Turnovers per game	FG%	Field-goal percentage	3P%	3-point field-goal percentage	FT%	Free-throw percentage
**Bold**	Career best	°	League leader

=== WNBA ===
==== Regular season ====
Year	Team	GP	GS	MPG	FG%	3P%	FT%	RPG	APG	SPG	BPG	TO	PPG
2010	Chicago	**34**	2	19.6	.427	.338	.784	2.0	2.7	1.6	0.1	1.8	9.8
2011	Chicago	**34**	27	29.4	.375	.373	.804	2.1	3.0	**2.3**	**0.4**	1.7	13.6
2012	Chicago	26	25	30.0	.442	.407	.899	3.5	3.1	1.8	0.3	2.0	**18.1**
2013	Chicago	31	**31**	30.0	.376	.396	.900	2.7	3.0	1.6	**0.4**	1.4	15.0
2014	Chicago	26	24	**32.3**	.383	.327	.876	3.0	**3.8**	1.9	**0.4**	1.8	15.0
2015	New York	24	23	28.6	.467	.356	.900	2.9	3.4	2.0	0.2	1.6	15.0
2016	New York	6	0	13.8	.400	.364	**1.000**	1.5	0.7	0.3	0.0	0.3	5.2
2017	New York	28	25	26.8	.401	.344	.878	**3.6**	2.9	1.3	0.3	1.3	12.0
2018	New York	16	12	19.1	.393	.419	.875	1.6	1.7	0.9	0.0	1.1	8.4
2019	Las Vegas	3	0	9.3	**.500**	.429	–	0.7	1.0	0.3	0.3	**0.0**	4.3
2020^{†}	Seattle	15	0	12.7	.386	.333	.846	1.2	1.4	0.4	0.1	0.8	4.3
2021	Seattle	29	2	14.3	.439	**.500**	.897	1.6	1.7	0.7	0.2	0.9	5.8
2022	Seattle	33	0	12.3	.355	.356	.840	1.0	1.8	0.6	0.1	0.5	3.9
2023	New York	10	0	7.1	.400	.300	**1.000**	0.6	0.8	0.2	0.1	0.7	1.8
Career	14 years, 4 teams	315	171	22.7	.405	.376	.865	2.2	2.5	1.4	0.2	1.3	10.7

==== Postseason ====
Year	Team	GP	GS	MPG	FG%	3P%	FT%	RPG	APG	SPG	BPG	TO	PPG
2013	Chicago	2	2	33.5	.333	.286	**1.000**	1.5	0.5	1.5	0.0	**0.0**	**14.5**
2014	Chicago	**9**	**9**	29.1	.296	.273	.800	3.4	2.1	**1.6**	0.8	1.4	9.2
2015	New York	6	6	32.7	.359	.379	.750	2.8	**3.0**	1.2	0.3	1.8	13.2
2016	New York	1	0	17.0	**.500**	**.667**	**1.000**	3.0	**3.0**	0.0	0.0	**0.0**	12.0
2017	New York	1	1	**35.0**	.444	.286	**1.000**	**5.0**	2.0	1.0	0.0	2.0	12.0
2019	Las Vegas	3	0	1.7	.333	–	–	0.0	0.0	0.0	0.0	**0.0**	0.7
2020^{†}	Seattle	5	0	13.0	.471	.364	.833	0.8	2.2	1.0	0.0	0.4	5.0
2021	Seattle	1	0	9.0	.000	.000	–	0.0	1.0	0.0	**1.0**	2.0	0.0
2022	Seattle	6	0	5.0	.200	.000	–	0.3	0.3	0.2	0.0	0.2	0.3
Career	9 years, 4 teams	34	18	20.3	.339	.319	.842	1.9	1.7	0.9	0.3	0.9	7.2

=== College ===
Legend
GP	Games played	GS	Games started	MPG	Minutes per game
FG%	Field goal percentage	3P%	3-point field goal percentage	FT%	Free throw percentage
RPG	Rebounds per game	APG	Assists per game	SPG	Steals per game
BPG	Blocks per game	PPG	Points per game	**Bold**	Career high

Year	Team	GP	Points	FG%	3P%	FT%	RPG	APG	SPG	BPG	PPG
2006–07	Rutgers	**36**	439	43.2	**36.8**	79.9	4.1	2.8	2.5	0.3	12.2
2007–08	Rutgers	34	469	**45.2**	35.5	74.4	**5.2**	2.8	2.5	0.3	13.8
2008–09	Rutgers	33	**644**	41.7	31.1	**80.6**	4.9	2.8	**2.6**	0.3	**19.5**
Career	Rutgers	103	1552	43.2	34.2	78.8	4.7	2.8	2.5	0.3	15.1

== Awards and honors ==
- WNBA Champion (2020)
- 2× WNBA All-Star (2011, 2013)
- All-WNBA Second Team (2015)
- Commissioner’s Cup champion (2021)
- WNBA 3-point field goal percentage leader: (2021)
- The Daily News Player of the Year (2004)
- Student Sports Sophomore of the Year (2004)
- USA Today All-USA
  - Second Team (2006)
- Parade Magazine All-American
  - First Team (2006)
  - Second Team (2005)
- Street & Smith’s All-American
  - First Team (2006)
  - First Team (2005)

== See also ==
- List of basketball players who have scored 100 points in a single game
- List of WNBA annual 3-point field goal percentage leaders
