= Sasha Goodlett =

American basketball player (born 1990)

No. 11 – East Perth Eagles
- Position: Center
- League: NBL1 West

Personal information
- Born: August 9, 1990 (age 36) Jackson, Mississippi, U.S.
- Listed height: 6 ft 5 in (1.96 m)
- Listed weight: 239 lb (108 kg)

Career information
- High school: Clinton (Clinton, Mississippi)
- College: Georgia Tech (2008–2012)
- WNBA draft: 2012: 1st round, 11th overall pick
- Drafted by: Indiana Fever
- Playing career: 2012–present

Career history
- 2012–2013: Indiana Fever
- 2012: Heilongjiang Chenneng
- 2012–2013: Arras Pays d'Artois Basket Feminin
- 2013–2016: Woori Bank Hansae
- 2014–2015: Chicago Sky
- 2016: Montaneras de Morovis
- 2016–2017: Mersin Universitesi
- 2017–2018: Bodrum Basketbol
- 2018–2020: Cankaya Universitesi Ankara
- 2020–2021: Bursa BSB
- 2021–2022: Emlak Konut Istanbul
- 2022: Halcones de Xalapa
- 2022–2023: Tarsus Belediyesi Mersin
- 2023–2024: Zonguldak
- 2024–2025: Hapoel Petah Tikva
- 2025–present: East Perth Eagles

Career highlights
- WNBA champion (2012); 6× TKBL champion (2018, 2019, 2021–2024); 2× WKBL champion (2015, 2016); 3× WKBL All-Star (2014–2016); Second-team All-ACC (2012)
- Stats at WNBA.com
- Stats at Basketball Reference

Sasha Samolia Goodlett (born August 9, 1990) is an American professional basketball player. She played college basketball for the Georgia Tech Yellow Jackets and was drafted with the 11th overall pick in the 2012 WNBA draft by the Indiana Fever.

== Early life ==
Goodlett was born in Jackson, Mississippi. She attended Clinton High School in Clinton, Mississippi.

== College career ==
Goodlett played four years of college basketball for the Georgia Tech Yellow Jackets between 2008 and 2012.

== Professional career ==
=== WNBA ===
Goodlett was drafted with the 11th overall pick in the 2022 WNBA draft by the Indiana Fever. She played for the Fever in the 2012 WNBA season and the 2013 WNBA season. She joined the Chicago Sky for the 2014 WNBA season and played a second and final season for the Sky in 2015.

=== Overseas ===
Goodlett played 11 games for Heilongjiang Chenneng in the WCBA to begin the 2012–13 season before joining French team Arras Pays d'Artois Basket Feminin in December 2012. She left France in January 2013 after playing six games for Arras Pays d'Artois.

Goodlett played three seasons for Korean team Woori Bank Hansae in 2013–14, 2014–15 and 2015–16. After a season in Puerto Rico for Montaneras de Morovis in 2016, she joined Mersin Universitesi in Turkey for the 2016–17 season. She went on to play eight seasons in Turkey, seven in the TKBL and one in the KBSL. She played for Bodrum Basketbol (2017–18), Cankaya Universitesi Ankara (2018–20), Bursa BSB (2020–21), Emlak Konut Istanbul (2021–22), Tarsus Belediyesi Mersin (2022–23), and Zonguldak (2023–24). During this time, she played for Halcones de Xalapa in Mexico in 2022. She played for Hapoel Petah Tikva in Israel in 2024–25.

Goodlett joined the East Perth Eagles of the NBL1 West in Australia for the 2025 season.

== Career statistics ==
Legend
GP	Games played	GS	Games started	MPG	Minutes per game	RPG	Rebounds per game
APG	Assists per game	SPG	Steals per game	BPG	Blocks per game	PPG	Points per game
TO	Turnovers per game	FG%	Field-goal percentage	3P%	3-point field-goal percentage	FT%	Free-throw percentage
**Bold**	Career best	°	League leader

†	Denotes season in which Goodlett won a WNBA championship

=== WNBA ===
==== Regular season ====
WNBA regular season statistics
Year	Team	GP	GS	MPG	FG%	3P%	FT%	RPG	APG	SPG	BPG	TO	PPG
2012 †	Indiana	26	0	7.6	44.6	—	70.0	1.6	0.2	**0.3**	0.3	**0.3**	3.1
2013	Indiana	25	1	7.5	35.8	—	**85.7**	1.6	0.2	0.1	0.1	0.4	1.8
2014	Chicago	**34**	**15**	12.9	45.4	—	72.2	**2.3**	**0.3**	**0.3**	0.5	0.6	**3.4**
2015	Chicago	16	5	**13.1**	**53.8**	—	**85.7**	1.9	**0.3**	0.2	**0.6**	0.9	2.1
**Career**	4 years, 2 teams	101	21	10.2	44.0	—	74.3	1.9	0.2	0.2	0.4	0.5	2.7

==== Playoffs ====
WNBA playoff statistics
Year	Team	GP	GS	MPG	FG%	3P%	FT%	RPG	APG	SPG	BPG	TO	PPG
2012 †	Indiana	1	0	0.0	—	—	—	0.0	0.0	0.0	0.0	**0.0**	0.0
2014	Chicago	**7**	0	**4.1**	**25.0**	—	**50.0**	**0.7**	0.0	**0.3**	0.0	0.3	**0.4**
**Career**	2 years, 2 teams	8	0	3.6	25.0	—	50.0	0.6	0.0	0.3	0.0	0.3	0.4

=== College ===
NCAA statistics
Year	Team	GP	Points	FG%	3P%	FT%	RPG	APG	SPG	BPG	PPG
2008–09	Georgia Tech	32	202	42.3	—	63.3	3.7	0.3	0.7	0.9	6.3
2009–10	Georgia Tech	33	319	46.4	—	66.4	5.3	1.1	0.9	0.7	9.7
2010–11	Georgia Tech	34	337	47.4	—	64.9	5.8	1.1	0.6	0.8	9.9
2011–12	Georgia Tech	**35**	**506**	**51.7**	—	**68.3**	**7.7**	1.1	**1.2**	**1.4**	**14.5**
**Career**		134	1364	47.7	—	66.4	5.7	0.9	0.9	0.9	10.2
