= Erlana Larkins =

American basketball player (born 1986)

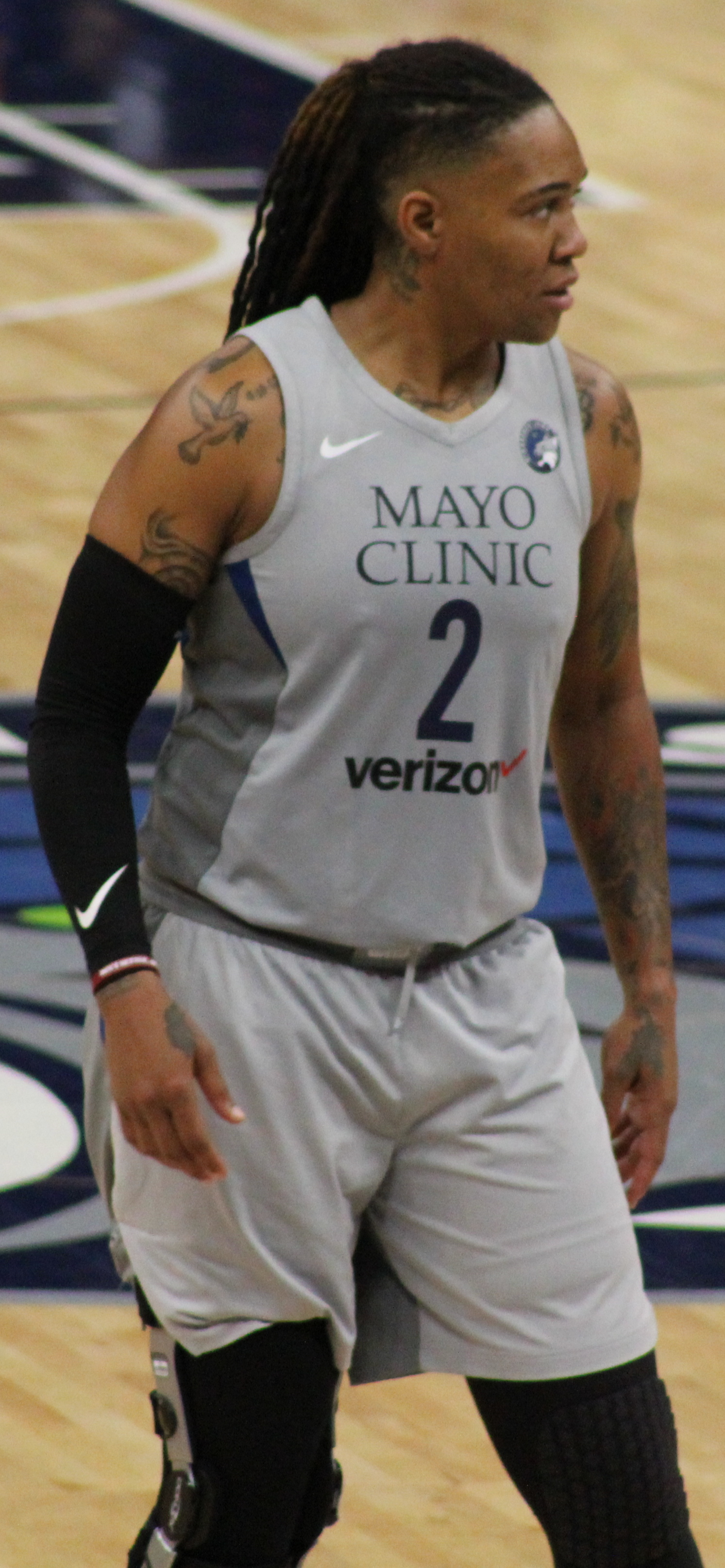
- Larkins in 2018

Free Agent
- Position: Power forward
- League: WNBA

Personal information
- Born: April 2, 1986 (age 40) West Palm Beach, Florida, U.S.
- Listed height: 6 ft 1 in (1.85 m)
- Listed weight: 205 lb (93 kg)

Career information
- High school: The Benjamin School (North Palm Beach, Florida)
- College: North Carolina (2004–2008)
- WNBA draft: 2008: 1st round, 14th overall pick
- Drafted by: New York Liberty
- Playing career: 2008–2018

Career history
- 2008–2009: New York Liberty
- 2008–2009: Samsun Basketbol
- 2009–2013: Mersin BŞB
- 2012–2017: Indiana Fever
- 2013–2014: Jiangsu Phoenix
- 2014: Famila Schio
- 2014–2015: Adana ASKİ
- 2018: Minnesota Lynx

Career highlights
- WNBA champion (2012); Turkish Cup winner (2015); State Farm Coaches' All-American (2008); All-American – USBWA (2008); ACC Tournament MVP (2008); Second-team All-American – AP (2008); Third-team All-American – AP (2007); 3× First-team All-ACC (2006–2008); ACC All-Freshman Team (2005); McDonald's All-American (2004)
- Stats at WNBA.com
- Stats at Basketball Reference
Medals
Women's basketball
Representing the United States
Pan American Games
Gold medal – first place	2007 Brazil	Team
FIBA Under-19 World Cup
Gold medal – first place	2005 Tunisia	Team
FIBA Under-18 Americas Championship
Gold medal – first place	2004 Puerto Rico	Team

Erlana La'Nay Larkins (born April 2, 1986) is an American former professional basketball player.

== Early life ==
Larkins played for The Benjamin School in North Palm Beach, Florida, where she was named a WBCA All-American. She participated in the 2004 WBCA High School All-America Game where she scored four points. She is the school's all-time leading scorer with over 3,000 career points.

== USA basketball ==
Larkins was a member of the USA Women's U18 team which won the gold medal at the FIBA Americas Championship in Mayaguez, Puerto Rico. The event was held in August 2004, when the USA team defeated Puerto Rico to win the championship. Larkins helped the team win the gold medal, scoring 9.0 points per game and recording eleven steals during the event.

She continued on as the U18 team became the USA Women's U19 team which competed in the 2005 U19 World Championships in Tunis, Tunisia. The USA team won all eight games, winning the gold medal. Larkins hit eight out of nine field goals attempts in the opening round game against South Korea. In the gold medal game, she was a perfect nine for nine, scoring 20 points.

Larkins played for the USA team in the 2007 Pan American Games in Rio de Janeiro, Brazil. The team won all five games, earning the gold medal for the event.

== College career ==
Larkins played college basketball at the University of North Carolina for the Tar Heels. She made the all-ACC first team in 2006, 2007, and 2008, and was the ACC Tournament MVP in 2008. She was an AP All-American in 2007 (third team) and 2008 (second team), in addition to being named to the State Farm and USBWA All-American teams in 2008. She played in two Final Fours while playing for the Tar Heels, where she was selected to the NCAA Final Four All-Tournament Team in 2006.

=== North Carolina statistics ===
Legend
GP	Games played	GS	Games started	MPG	Minutes per game
FG%	Field goal percentage	3P%	3-point field goal percentage	FT%	Free throw percentage
RPG	Rebounds per game	APG	Assists per game	SPG	Steals per game
BPG	Blocks per game	PPG	Points per game	**Bold**	Career high

Year	Team	GP	Points	FG%	3P%	FT%	RPG	APG	SPG	BPG	PPG
2004–05	North Carolina	34	**496**	**60.9%**	0.0%	**82.2%**	7.1	1.6	2.1	**1.1**	14.6
2005–06	North Carolina	35	482	56.8%	**44.4%**	70.2%	7.2	2.5	**2.2**	1.0	**13.8**
2006–07	North Carolina	**37**	476	56.7%	0.0%	67.9%	9.4	2.8	**2.2**	0.5	12.9
2007–08	North Carolina	35	473	52.7%	0.0%	60.1%	**9.5**	**3.1**	1.9	0.6	13.5
Career		141	1927	56.7%	22.2%	69.5%	8.3	2.5	2.1	0.8	13.7

== Professional career ==
=== WNBA ===
Larkins was drafted 14th overall by the New York Liberty in the 2008 WNBA draft. In her rookie season, she averaged 4.8 ppg and 2.7 rpg off the bench. In 2010, Larkins was waived by the Liberty. During her three-year absence from the WNBA she played overseas in Turkey for Mersin Büyükşehir Belediyesi. In 2011, Larkins had signed a training camp contract with the Phoenix Mercury but was waived before the start of the season.

In 2012, Larkins signed with the Indiana Fever. In her first season with the Fever, she averaged 4.1 ppg and 4.4 rpg as a reserve. The Fever finished second place in the Eastern Conference with a 22–12 record. During the playoffs, Larkins was put in the starting lineup at the four spot and was effective for the Fever with her scoring and rebounding, nearly averaging a double-double (9.9 ppg and 10.9 rpg). The Fever would eventually end up winning the 2012 WNBA Championship after they defeated the Minnesota Lynx 3–1 in the Finals. During the series, Larkins had tied the second-most total for rebounds in a WNBA Finals game when she grabbed 15 rebounds in Game 1.

The following season, Larkins became the starting power forward for the Fever and averaged 7.9 ppg as well as 7.8 rpg. In 2014, Larkins re-signed with the Fever. During the 2014 season, Larkins put up career-best averages of 9.7 ppg and 9.2 rpg (ranked fourth in the league). She had also led the league in field goal percentage, shooting 59%.

In the 2015 season, Larkins missed several games due to a knee injury and played 21 games with only 3 starts, but was able to start again for the Fever during the playoffs. The Fever had advanced all the way to the Finals for a rematch with the Lynx but lost the series 3–2.

In the 2016 season, Larkins was healthy again after undergoing surgery on her knee. She started in 33 games, averaging 8.3 ppg and 7.4 rpg. She also achieved a career-high in field goal percentage, shooting 63% which was ranked second in the league. The Fever made it to the playoffs, but were eliminated in the first round elimination game by the Phoenix Mercury.

In 2017, Larkins re-signed with the Fever once again in free agency. During the 2017 season, Larkins started in 17 of the 34 games played, with her role reduced from the starting center and her minutes cut. The Fever finished with a disappointing 9–25 record and 11th place in the league.

On May 17, 2018, Larkins was waived by the Fever before the 2018 WNBA season. On July 12, 2018, Larkins signed a 7-day contract with the Minnesota Lynx. On July 19, 2018, Larkins signed a second 7-day contract with the Lynx. On July 30, 2018, Larkins signed with the Lynx for the rest of the season. The Lynx finished 18–16 with the number 7 seed in the league, but Larkins would receive no playing time in the postseason. The Lynx lost the first round elimination game to the Los Angeles Sparks 75–68.

On February 28, 2019, Larkins re-signed with the Lynx in free agency.

On May 22, 2019, Larkins was waived by the Lynx.

=== Overseas ===
In the 2008–09 WNBA off-season, Larkins played in Turkey for Samsun B.K. From 2009 to 2013, Larkins played four off-seasons for Mersin Büyükşehir Belediyesi. In the first portion of the 2013–14 WNBA off-season, Larkins played in China for the Jiangsu Phoenix and played the rest of the off-season in Italy for Famila Schio. In the 2014–15 WNBA off-season, Larkins played in Turkey for Adana ASKİ SK.

== WNBA career statistics ==
Legend
GP	Games played	GS	Games started	MPG	Minutes per game	RPG	Rebounds per game
APG	Assists per game	SPG	Steals per game	BPG	Blocks per game	PPG	Points per game
TO	Turnovers per game	FG%	Field-goal percentage	3P%	3-point field-goal percentage	FT%	Free-throw percentage
**Bold**	Career best	°	League leader

†	Denotes seasons in which Larkins won a WNBA championship

=== Regular season ===
Year	Team	GP	GS	MPG	FG%	3P%	FT%	RPG	APG	SPG	BPG	TO	PPG
2008	New York	27	0	12.4	.511	.000	.589	2.7	0.7	0.3	0.2	1.3	4.8
2009	New York	18	0	7.6	.424	.000	.696	1.7	0.4	0.5	0.2	0.8	2.4
2012^{†}	Indiana	**34**	2	15.5	.509	.000	.861	4.4	1.1	1.0	0.1	1.0	4.1
2013	Indiana	**34**	**34**	30.1	.545	.000	.708	7.8	1.9	1.4	0.3	1.3	7.9
2014	Indiana	33	33	**31.6**	.599	.000	.716	**9.2**	**2.5**	**1.9**	**0.8**	2.2	**9.7**
2015	Indiana	21	3	16.8	.407	.000	.684	4.2	1.3	0.9	0.1	**0.7**	3.5
2016	Indiana	33	33	26.7	**.639**	.000	.884	7.4	2.1	0.9	0.4	1.6	8.3
2017	Indiana	**34**	17	18.8	.581	.000	.912	4.2	1.1	0.5	0.2	1.2	4.9
2018	Minnesota	13	0	12.9	.444	.000	**1.000**	2.7	1.3	0.6	0.1	0.6	2.1
Career	9 years, 3 teams	247	122	20.7	.554	.000	.749	5.4	1.5	1.0	0.3	1.3	5.9

=== Postseason ===
Year	Team	GP	GS	MPG	FG%	3P%	FT%	RPG	APG	SPG	BPG	TO	PPG
2008	New York	6	0	14.5	.458	.000	.400	4.8	0.2	0.5	0.1	**1.3**	4.3
2012^{†}	Indiana	10	9	32.0	.542	.000	.778	**10.9**	1.2	0.7	0.8	1.8	9.9
2013	Indiana	4	4	33.5	.567	.000	**1.000**	10.3	1.3	0.2	**1.5**	2.5	**10.8**
2014	Indiana	5	5	**35.3**	.531	.000	.733	10.4	**1.8**	**1.2**	0.6	1.4	9.0
2015	Indiana	**11**	**10**	28.3	**.569**	.000	.813	7.2	1.4	1.0	0.5	1.8	7.2
2016	Indiana	1	1	27.9	.545	.000	.000	6.0	1.0	0.0	0.0	2.0	12.0
Career	6 years, 2 teams	37	29	28.6	.542	.000	.753	8.5	1.2	0.8	0.7	1.8	8.2
