= Markeisha Gatling =

American basketball player (born 1992)

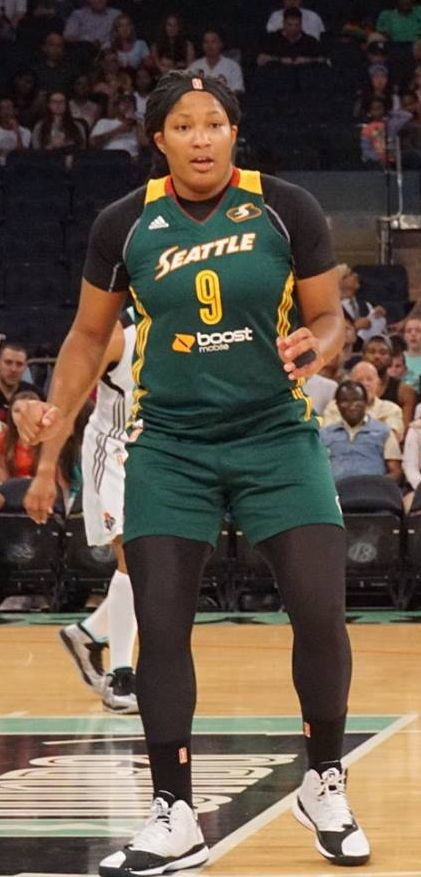

Personal information
- Born: July 14, 1992 (age 34)
- Listed height: 6 ft 4 in (1.93 m)
- Listed weight: 227 lb (103 kg)

Career information
- High school: Athens Drive (Raleigh, North Carolina)
- College: Gulf Coast CC (2010–2012); NC State (2012–2014)
- WNBA draft: 2014: 1st round, 10th overall pick
- Drafted by: Chicago Sky
- Playing career: 2014–2023
- Position: Center

Career history
- 2014: Chicago Sky
- 2015: Artego Bydgoszcz
- 2015–2016: Incheon Shinhan Bank S-Birds
- 2015–2016: Seattle Storm
- 2016: Atlanta Dream
- 2016–2017: Beşiktaş JK
- 2017–2018: Basket Landes
- 2018–2019: Verga Palermo
- 2020–2021: Casademont Zaragoza
- 2021–2022: Nadezhda Orenburg
- 2022–2023: Casademont Zaragoza
- 2024–2025: Casademont Zaragoza
- 2025–2026: AZS UMCS Lublin

Career highlights
- Copa de la Reina winner (2023); Basket Liga Kobiet champion (2026); Liga Femenina Most Valuable Player (2021); Basket Liga Kobiet Most Valuable Player (2026); Basket Liga Kobiet Finals MVP (2026)
- Stats at WNBA.com
- Stats at Basketball Reference

Markeisha Gatling (born July 14, 1992) is an American and Montenegrin former professional basketball player.

== College career ==
Gatling spent two years at Gulf Coast Community College and then attended North Carolina State University the next two years.

== Professional career ==
=== WNBA ===
Gatling was drafted with the 10th overall pick in the 2014 WNBA draft by the Chicago Sky. Gatling averaged 10.7 points and 2.4 rebounds in 2014, her rookie year with the Sky. Upon the 2015 season, she was waived by the Sky and then signed with the Seattle Storm. During the 2015 season, she averaged a career-high in scoring. In the 2016 season, Gatling was waived by the Storm after 11 games played and the signed with the Atlanta Dream. In February 2017, Gatling re-signed with the Dream to a training camp contract. In May 2017, Gatling was waived by the Dream.

=== Overseas ===
On 8 January 2015, she joined Artego Bydgoszcz in the Polish league. In the 2015–16 WNBA off-season, Gatling played in Korea for Incheon Shinhan Bank S-Birds. In August 2016, she signed a short-term deal with Beşiktaş JK of the Turkish League for the 2016–17 season. In 2018–19, she played in France for Basket Landes. In 2019–20 she played in Italy. In 2022, she returned to Casademont Zaragoza, with whom she won the Copa de la Reina title in 2023. At the end of the season he announces his goodbye to Casademont Zaragoza.

She announced her retirement in May 2023, but on 30 May 2024, she returned to active basketball and rejoined Casademont Zaragoza in the Spanish Liga Femenina.

Gatling joined AZS UMCS Lublin in Poland ahead of the 2025–26 season. After leading the team to the title, winning the MVP and Finals MVP awards, she retired again in May 2026.

== Career statistics ==
Legend
GP	Games played	GS	Games started	MPG	Minutes per game	FG%	Field goal percentage
3P%	3-point field goal percentage	FT%	Free throw percentage	RPG	Rebounds per game	APG	Assists per game
SPG	Steals per game	BPG	Blocks per game	TO	Turnovers per game	PPG	Points per game
**Bold**	Career high	*	Led Division I

=== WNBA ===
==== Regular season ====
Year	Team	GP	GS	MPG	FG%	3P%	FT%	RPG	APG	SPG	BPG	TO	PPG
2014	Chicago	**29**	1	11.0	**64.8**	0.0	72.7	2.4	0.0	0.1	0.4	0.7	3.7
2015	Seattle	25	**4**	**13.7**	49.5	0.0	86.8	**3.7**	0.3	**0.4**	**0.6**	1.0	**5.3**
2016	Seattle	11	0	5.8	52.9	0.0	**100.0**	0.8	0.1	0.1	0.3	0.9	2.3
2016	Atlanta	16	2	10.5	44.7	0.0	88.9	2.4	**0.4**	0.3	0.3	**0.6**	2.6
Career	4 years, 3 teams	81	7	11.0	53.7	0.0	84.2	2.6	0.2	0.2	0.4	0.8	3.8

==== Playoffs ====
Year	Team	GP	GS	MPG	FG%	3P%	FT%	RPG	APG	SPG	BPG	TO	PPG
2014	Chicago	**5**	0	4.2	**60.0**	0.0	0.0	**0.6**	0.0	0.0	0.0	0.0	1.2
2016	Atlanta	2	0	**7.0**	0.0	0.0	**75.0**	0.5	0.0	0.0	**0.5**	0.0	**1.5**
Career	2 years, 2 teams	7	0	5.0	60.0	0.0	75.0	0.6	0.0	0.0	0.1	0.0	1.3

=== College ===
Year	Team	GP	GS	MPG	FG%	3P%	FT%	RPG	APG	SPG	BPG	TO	PPG
2012–13	NC State	**34**	30	23.5	57.7	0.0	69.4	6.3	0.2	0.6	0.9	2.2	9.6
2013–14	NC State	32	**32**	**27.5**	**66.3***	0.0	**74.2**	**7.2**	**1.3**	**0.7**	**1.1**	**1.9**	**17.4**
**Career**		66	62	25.	62.8	0.0	72.4	6.7	0.7	0.7	1.0	2.1	13.4
Statistics retrieved from Sports-Reference.
