= Courtney Clements =

American basketball player (born 1989)

Personal information
- Born: November 12, 1989 (age 37) Santa Ana, California, U.S.
- Listed height: 6 ft 0 in (1.83 m)
- Listed weight: 155 lb (70 kg)

Career information
- High school: Artesia (Lakewood, California); Millikan (Long Beach, California)
- College: Arizona (2008–2009); San Diego State (2010–2013)
- WNBA draft: 2013: undrafted
- Playing career: 2013–present
- Position: Guard

Career history
- 2013: Atlanta Dream
- 2014: Chicago Sky
- 2015: Los Angeles Sparks

Career highlights
- MWC Player of the Year (2012); 2x First-team All-MWC (2012, 2013); Pac-10 All-Freshman Team (2009)
- Stats at WNBA.com
- Stats at Basketball Reference

Courtney Simone Clements (born November 12, 1989) is an American former professional basketball player in the Women's National Basketball Association (WNBA). She played college basketball for the Arizona Wildcats and San Diego State Aztecs. She played in the WNBA for the Chicago Sky however, she got waived in 2015.

== San Diego State statistics ==
Legend
GP	Games played	GS	Games started	MPG	Minutes per game
FG%	Field goal percentage	3P%	3-point field goal percentage	FT%	Free throw percentage
RPG	Rebounds per game	APG	Assists per game	SPG	Steals per game
BPG	Blocks per game	PPG	Points per game	**Bold**	Career high

Year	Team	GP	Points	FG%	3P%	FT%	RPG	APG	SPG	BPG	PPG
2008-09	Arizona	27	276	33.8%	27.1%	**88.9%**	3.5	0.7	1.0	0.1	10.2
2009-10	San Diego State	redshirt									
2010-11	San Diego State	29	332	38.8%	33.3%	80.9%	3.6	1.2	0.8	0.1	11.4
2011-12	San Diego State	32	556	**43.4%**	34.1%	86.9%	**5.3**	0.7	0.8	0.4	17.4
2012-13	San Diego State	**34**	**607**	41.5%	**37.9%**	87.7%	4.7	**1.5**	**1.6**	**0.6**	**17.9**
Career		122	1771	40.2%	33.9%	86.4%	4.3	1.1	1.1	0.3	14.5
