= 2011 Minnesota Lynx season =

- WNBA champions
- Head coach: Cheryl Reeve
- Arena: Target Center

Results
- Record: 27–7 (.794)
- Place: 1st (Western)
- Playoff finish: Won WNBA Finals

Media
- Television: FS-N; ESPN2, NBATV
- Radio: KLCI

The 2011 Minnesota Lynx season was the 13th season for the Minnesota Lynx of the Women's National Basketball Association, and the 2nd season under head coach Cheryl Reeve.

The Lynx qualified for the WNBA Playoffs for the first time since 2004 and won their first Western Conference championship.

The Lynx finished the season with a 27–7 record, best in the WNBA and the best regular-season record in franchise history. They then defeated the San Antonio Silver Stars in three games and the Phoenix Mercury in two to reach the 2011 WNBA Finals.

The Lynx swept the Atlanta Dream to win their first WNBA championship.

== Offseason ==
=== 2011 WNBA draft ===
The Lynx held the first overall pick in the 2011 draft, and surprised nobody by selecting Maya Moore, a 6'0" forward out of Connecticut. Moore had won three consecutive Wade Trophies as the best player in women's college basketball, the only player to have done so. She had also won two championships with the Huskies. The Lynx also held the fourth overall pick, which they used to select Amber Harris from Xavier. Both Moore and Harris would ultimately make the team out of training camp.

In the second round, the Lynx selected Jessica Breland, Felicia Chester, and Kachine Alexander. The Lynx ultimately released Alexander.

Round	Pick	Player	Nationality	School/team/country
1	1	Maya Moore	United States	Connecticut
1	4 (from Conn.)	Amber Harris	United States	Xavier
2	13 (from Tul. via Conn.)	Jessica Breland	United States	North Carolina
2	14	Felicia Chester	United States	DePaul
2	26	Kachine Alexander	United States	Iowa

=== Free agency ===
The Lynx declined to re-sign Hamchetou Maiga-Ba and Kristen Mann. Instead, they signed veteran center Taj McWilliams-Franklin and center/forward Jessica Adair, who had played one game with the Lynx in the 2010 season.

=== Trades ===
The Lynx traded the draft rights to Jessica Breland to the New York Liberty for Angel Robinson and a second-round pick in the 2012 WNBA draft. They traded Felicia Chester to the Atlanta Dream for Rachel Jarry and a second-round pick in the 2012 draft. They traded Quanitra Hollingsworth to the Liberty for the rights to swap third-round picks in the 2012 draft, and they traded Nicky Anosike for a first-round pick in the 2012 draft. The Lynx ultimately waived Jarry and Robinson.

Date	Trade	
April 9, 2011	To Minnesota Lynx	To Washington Mystics
April 9, 2011	first-round pick in 2012 draft	Nicky Anosike
April 11, 2011	To Minnesota Lynx	To New York Liberty
April 11, 2011	Angel Robinson and a second-round pick in 2012 draft	Jessica Breland
April 11, 2011	To Minnesota Lynx	To Atlanta Dream
April 11, 2011	Rachel Jarry and a second-round pick in 2012 draft	Felicia Chester
May 27, 2011	To Minnesota Lynx	To New York Liberty
May 27, 2011	right to swap third-round picks in 2012 draft	Quanitra Hollingsworth

=== Transaction log ===
- February 1: The Lynx signed Jessica Adair.
- February 18: The Lynx signed Taj McWilliams-Franklin.
- April 9: The Lynx traded Nicky Anosike to the Washington Mystics in exchange for their first-round pick in the 2012 draft.
- April 11: The Lynx traded draft rights to Jessica Breland to the New York Liberty for the draft rights to Angel Robinson and New York's second-round pick in the 2012 draft.
- April 11: The Lynx traded Felecia Chester to the Atlanta Dream for Rachel Jarry and a 2012 second-round draft pick.
- May 12: The Lynx waived Hamchetou Maiga-Ba.
- May 27: The Lynx waived Angel Robinson and Kachine Alexander.
- May 27: The Lynx traded Quanitra Hollingsworth to the New York Liberty in exchange for the right to swap third-round picks in the 2012 draft.

==== Additions ====
Player	Signed	Former team
Jessica Adair	February 1, 2011	free agent
Taj McWilliams-Franklin	February 18, 2011	New York Liberty
Maya Moore	April 11, 2011	draft pick
Amber Harris	April 11, 2011	draft pick

==== Subtractions ====
Player	Left	New team
Nicky Anosike	April 9, 2011	Washington Mystics
Hamchetou Maiga-Ba	May 12, 2011	free agent
Kristen Mann	May 13, 2011	free agent
Quanitra Hollingsworth	May 27, 2011	New York Liberty

== Roster ==
2011 Minnesota Lynx roster
Players
Coaches

Pos.	No.	Nat.	Name	Height	Weight	DOB	From	Yrs
C	1	(United States)	Adair, Jessica	6' 4" (1.93m)	206 lb (93kg)	1986-12-19	George Washington	1
G/F	33	(United States)	Augustus, Seimone	6' 0" (1.83m)	179 lb (81kg)	1984-04-30	LSU	5
F	32	(United States)	Brunson, Rebekkah	6' 2" (1.88m)	175 lb (79kg)	1981-12-11	Georgetown	7
F	6	(United States)	Harris, Amber	6' 5" (1.96m)	215 lb (98kg)	1988-01-16	Xavier	R
G	14	(United States)	Hornbuckle, Alexis	5' 10" (1.78m)	155 lb (70kg)	1985-10-16	Tennessee	3
F	24	(United States)	Houston, Charde	6' 0" (1.83m)	189 lb (86kg)	1986-04-10	Connecticut	3
F/C	8	(United States)	McWilliams-Franklin, Taj	6' 2" (1.88m)	188 lb (85kg)	1970-08-20	St. Edward's	12
F	23	(United States)	Moore, Maya	6' 0" (1.83m)	175 lb (79kg)	1989-06-11	Connecticut	R
G	13	(United States)	Whalen, Lindsay	5' 9" (1.75m)	150 lb (68kg)	1982-05-09	Minnesota	7
G	11	(United States)	Wiggins, Candice	5' 11" (1.8m)	154 lb (70kg)	1987-02-14	Stanford	3
G/F	22	(United States)	Wright, Monica	5' 10" (1.78m)	178 lb (81kg)	1988-07-15	Virginia	1

Head coach
(United States) Cheryl Reeve (La Salle)
Assistant coaches
(United States) Shelley Patterson (Washington State)
(United States) Jim Petersen (Minnesota)
Athletic trainer
(United States) Chuck Barta (UW–La Crosse)
Assistant trainer
(United States) Keith Uzpen (Minnesota State)

Legend

- (C) Team captain
- (DP) Unsigned draft pick
- (FA) Free agent
- (S) Suspended
- Injured

=== Depth ===
Pos.	Starter	Bench
C	Taj McWilliams-Franklin	Jessica Adair
PF	Rebekkah Brunson	Amber Harris; Charde Houston
SF	Maya Moore	Monica Wright
SG	Seimone Augustus	Candice Wiggins
PG	Lindsay Whalen	Alexis Hornbuckle

== Season standings ==
Western Conference	W	L	PCT	GB	Home	Road	Conf.
Minnesota Lynx ^{x}	27	7	.794	–	14–3	13–4	18–4
Seattle Storm ^{x}	21	13	.618	6.0	15–2	6–11	15–7
Phoenix Mercury ^{x}	19	15	.559	8.0	11–6	8–9	11–11
San Antonio Silver Stars ^{x}	18	16	.529	9.0	9–8	9–8	11–11
Los Angeles Sparks ^{o}	15	19	.441	12.0	10–7	5–12	10–12
Tulsa Shock ^{o}	3	31	.088	24.0	2–15	1–16	1–21

== Schedule ==
=== Preseason ===
2011 Game Log: Preseason

Game	Date	Time (ET)	Opponent	Score	High points	High rebounds	High assists	Location/Attendance	Record
1	May 24	1:00pm	Indiana	71–66	Brunson (11)	Harris (10)	Wright (4)	Concordia University; 2,055	1–0
2	May 31	7:00pm	@ Indiana	76–70	Whalen (12)	McWilliams-Franklin (8)	Wiggins (4)	Conseco Fieldhouse; 3,817	2–0

=== Regular season ===
2011 Game Log: Regular Season
June

Game	Date	Time (ET)	Opponent	TV	Score	High points	High rebounds	High assists	Location/Attendance	Record
1	June 3	11:00pm	@ Los Angeles	NBATV; PRIME	74–82	Moore (21)	Brunson (12)	Whalen (5)	Staples Center; 13,589	0–1
2	June 5	3:30pm	Los Angeles	FS-N; PRIME	86–69	Augustus (17)	Brunson (15)	Whalen (7)	Target Center; 10,123	1–1
3	June 7	8:00pm	Tulsa		75–65	Brunson (17)	Brunson (15)	Whalen (4)	Target Center; 7,713	2–1
4	June 9	10:00pm	@ Seattle		81–74	Brunson (22)	Brunson (14)	Whalen (10)	KeyArena; 6,291	3–1
5	June 17	8:00pm	Atlanta		96–85	Augustus (25)	Brunson (14)	Whalen (8)	Target Center; 7,556	4–1
6	June 19	3:00pm	@ Atlanta	SSO	77–64	Augustus (19)	McWilliams-Franklin (12)	Moore; Whalen (5)	Philips Arena; 7,274	5–1
7	June 24	10:00pm	@ Seattle	KONG	55–65	Augustus (17)	McWilliams-Franklin (8)	Whalen (3)	KeyArena; 7,914	5–2
8	June 26	7:00pm	Indiana	NBATV; FS-N	75–78	Moore (21)	Brunson (11)	Whalen (4)	Target Center; 7,117	5–3
9	June 30	8:00pm	@ Tulsa		101–73	Whalen (21)	McWilliams-Franklin (9)	Whalen (5)	BOK Center; 3,970	6–3

July

Game	Date	Time (ET)	Opponent	TV	Score	High points	High rebounds	High assists	Location/Attendance	Record
10	July 9	8:00pm	Connecticut	NBATV; FS-N	90–67	Moore (26)	Brunson; McWilliams-Franklin (10)	Whalen (8)	Target Center; 8,205	7–3
11	July 13	1:00pm	Phoenix	NBATV; FS-N; FS-A	105–112	Augustus (22)	Brunson (16)	Whalen (6)	Target Center; 11,820	7–4
12	July 15	7:00pm	@ Indiana		80–70	Brunson (20)	McWilliams-Franklin (9)	Whalen (7)	Conseco Fieldhouse; 7,538	8–4
13	July 16	8:00pm	Seattle		69–62	Augustus (19)	Moore (9)	McWilliams-Franklin (4)	Target Center; 7,733	9–4
14	July 20	3:30pm	@ Phoenix	NBATV; FS-A	106–98	Augustus (25)	Augustus; Brunson (6)	Whalen (8)	US Airways Center; 12,118	10–4
All-Star break
15	July 26	8:00pm	Los Angeles		85–72	Augustus (22)	McWilliams-Franklin (9)	Whalen (7)	Target Center; 8,044	11–4
16	July 29	8:00pm	Seattle		92–67	Augustus; Wiggins (16)	Augustus (5)	Moore (6)	Target Center; 7,856	12–4
17	July 31	3:00pm	@ San Antonio	NBATV	70–69	Whalen (23)	Brunson (13)	Whalen (6)	AT&T Center; 7,260	13–4

August

Game	Date	Time (ET)	Opponent	TV	Score	High points	High rebounds	High assists	Location/Attendance	Record
18	August 2	8:00pm	Phoenix	ESPN2	90–73	Moore (22)	McWilliams-Franklin (10)	Whalen (5)	Target Center; 7,126	14–4
19	August 4	8:00pm	San Antonio	NBATV; FS-SW	62–60	McWilliams-Franklin (18)	Brunson (13)	Whalen (6)	Target Center; 8,123	15–4
20	August 7	8:30pm	@ Los Angeles	NBATV	84–78	Whalen (24)	Augustus; Brunson (7)	Whalen (8)	Staples Center; 13,528	16–4
21	August 9	10:00pm	@ Phoenix		80–85	Moore (28)	Brunson (11)	Whalen (6)	US Airways Center; 6,726	16–5
22	August 12	8:30pm	@ Chicago	CN100	79–76	Whalen (16)	Brunson (11)	Whalen (6)	Allstate Arena; 6,289	17–5
23	August 14	7:00pm	Tulsa	NBATV; FS-N; COX	82–54	Augustus (16)	Brunson (6)	Whalen (9)	Target Center; 8,388	18–5
24	August 16	7:30pm	@ Connecticut	CSN-NE	79–108	Whalen (20)	Brunson; Moore (5)	McWilliams-Franklin (3)	Mohegan Sun Arena; 9,323	18–6
25	August 18	7:00pm	@ Washington		81–62	Augustus (18)	McWilliams-Franklin (7)	Whalen (7)	Verizon Center; 9,483	19–6
26	August 20	8:00pm	Los Angeles		87–68	Augustus (17)	McWilliams-Franklin (8)	Whalen (5)	Target Center; 8,816	20–6
27	August 23	8:00pm	@ Tulsa		78–72	McWilliams-Franklin (18)	Brunson (10)	McWilliams-Franklin; Whalen (4)	BOK Center; 3,750	21–6
28	August 26	8:00pm	San Antonio	NBATV	85–75	Augustus (19)	Brunson (8)	Whalen (9)	Target Center; 9,212	22–6
29	August 28	3:00pm	@ San Antonio		72–61	Augustus (20)	Brunson (14)	4 players (3)	AT&T Center; 7,924	23–6
30	August 30	8:00pm	Washington		73–56	Whalen (21)	Brunson (7)	Whalen (5)	Target Center; 8,065	24–6

September

Game	Date	Time (ET)	Opponent	TV	Score	High points	High rebounds	High assists	Location/Attendance	Record
31	September 2	8:00pm	New York		62–78	Augustus (17)	Brunson (8)	Augustus (6)	Target Center; 8,929	24–7
32	September 4	4:00pm	@ New York		86–68	Moore (19)	Brunson; McWilliams-Franklin; Moore (6)	Whalen (7)	Prudential Center; 8,247	25–7
33	September 8	8:00pm	Chicago	NBATV; FS-N; CN100	78–69	Augustus (22)	Moore; Whalen (7)	Whalen (10)	Target Center; 8,781	26–7
34	September 11	6:00pm	@ Phoenix	FS-A	96–90	Augustus; Moore; Wright (15)	Adair (13)	Wright (6)	US Airways Center; 12,666	27–7

All games are viewable on WNBA LiveAccess or ESPN3.com

=== Postseason ===
2011 Game Log: Postseason
Western Conference Semifinals

Game	Date	Time (ET)	Opponent	TV	Score	High points	High rebounds	High assists	Location/Attendance	Series
1	September 16	9:00pm	San Antonio	NBATV	66–65	Whalen (20)	Brunson (14)	Whalen (5)	Target Center; 11,891	1–0
2	September 18	5:00pm	@ San Antonio	ESPN2	75-84	Augustus (24)	Brunson (16)	Whalen (3)	AT&T Center; 7,023	1–1
3	September 20	8:00pm	San Antonio	ESPN2	85–67	Augustus (22)	Brunson (9)	Augustus; McWilliams-Franklin; Moore (4)	Target Center; 8,734	2–1

Western Conference Finals

Game	Date	Time (ET)	Opponent	TV	Score	High points	High rebounds	High assists	Location/Attendance	Series
1	September 22	9:00pm	Phoenix	ESPN2	95–67	Augustus (21)	Brunson (13)	Augustus (7)	Target Center; 8,912	1–0
2	September 25	5:00pm	@ Phoenix	ESPN2	103–86	McWilliams-Franklin; Moore (21)	Brunson (9)	McWilliams-Franklin (7)	US Airways Center; 8,617	2–0

WNBA Finals

Game	Date	Time (ET)	Opponent	TV	Score	High points	High rebounds	High assists	Location/Attendance	Series
1	October 2	8:30pm	Atlanta	ESPN	88–74	Brunson (26)	Brunson (11)	Augustus (7)	Target Center; 15,258	1–0
2	October 5	8:00pm	Atlanta	ESPN2	101–95	Augustus (36)	Augustus (8)	Whalen (4)	Target Center; 15,124	2–0
3	October 7	8:00pm	@ Atlanta	ESPN2	73–67	Augustus (16)	Brunson (9)	Augustus; McWilliams-Franklin (4)	Philips Arena; 11,543	3–0

== Statistics ==
Legend
GP	Games played	GS	Games started	MPG	Minutes per game	RPG	Rebounds per game
APG	Assists per game	SPG	Steals per game	BPG	Blocks per game	PPG	Points per game
FG%	Field-goal percentage	3P%	3-point field-goal percentage	FT%	Free-throw percentage	TO	Turnovers per game
PF	Fouls per game		Team leader		League leader

=== Regular season ===
Player	GP	GS	MPG	FG%	3P%	FT%	RPG	APG	SPG	BPG	PPG
Jessica Adair	31	1	10.4	.485	.000	.653	2.9	0.3	0.26	0.58	4.3
Seimone Augustus	34	34	29.3	.504	.417	.865	3.5	2.2	0.88	0.44	16.2
Rebekkah Brunson	34	34	27.6	.511	.000	.667	8.9	1.2	0.82	0.53	10.2
Amber Harris	27	0	10.3	.398	.000	.742	2.2	0.4	0.11	0.41	3.3
Alexis Hornbuckle	29	0	7.2	.375	.294	.500	1.1	0.6	0.34	0.10	1.1
Charde Houston	27	0	7.8	.365	.261	.750	1.7	0.5	0.33	0.07	2.9
Taj McWilliams-Franklin	34	33	28.4	.444	.222	.770	6.0	2.4	1.03	0.71	8.3
Maya Moore	34	34	28.0	.439	.369	.788	4.6	2.6	1.41	0.47	13.2
Lindsay Whalen	34	34	28.1	.511	.405	.730	3.5	5.9	1.09	0.15	13.6
Candice Wiggins	34	0	17.1	.386	.395	.625	1.9	1.5	0.53	0.21	5.9
Monica Wright	29	0	13.6	.379	.259	.750	1.6	1.1	0.79	0.17	5.1

=== Postseason ===
Player	GP	GS	MPG	FG%	3P%	FT%	RPG	APG	SPG	BPG	PPG
Jessica Adair	8	0	12.3	.469	.000	.667	3.60	0.3	0.63	0.63	5.8
Seimone Augustus	8	8	33.0	.527	.438	.886	4.50	3.8	0.88	0.63	22.0
Rebekkah Brunson	8	8	30.6	.473	.000	.781	10.80	1.5	0.88	0.63	11.9
Amber Harris	6	0	5.2	.400	1.000	.000	1.20	0.2	0.17	0.00	1.5
Alexis Hornbuckle	4	0	3.8	.600	.000	1.000	1.30	1.3	0.00	0.50	2.8
Charde Houston	2	0	6.0	.375	.000	.000	2.00	0.5	0.50	0.00	3.0
Taj McWilliams-Franklin	8	8	30.3	.455	.000	.833	5.30	3.3	0.60	1.25	10.6
Maya Moore	8	8	27.9	.458	.400	.690	5.90	2.3	1.00	0.63	13.8
Lindsay Whalen	8	8	32.0	.463	.286	.818	3.60	3.8	1.50	0.50	12.0
Candice Wiggins	8	0	16.0	.345	.348	.667	1.60	1.3	0.25	0.13	4.0
Monica Wright	8	0	10.6	.360	.250	.333	1.30	0.6	0.75	0.25	2.5

== Awards and honors ==
- Rebekkah Brunson was named WNBA Western Conference Player of the Week for the week of June 3, 2011.
- Rebekkah Brunson was named WNBA Western Conference Player of the Week for the week of July 11, 2011.
- Seimone Augustus was named WNBA Western Conference Player of the Week for the week of July 18, 2011.
- Seimone Augustus was named WNBA Western Conference Player of the Week for the week of August 1, 2011.
- Seimone Augustus was named WNBA Western Conference Player of the Week for the week of August 22, 2011.
- Rebekkah Brunson was named WNBA Western Conference Player of the Month for the month of June.
- Seimone Augustus was named WNBA Western Conference Player of the Month for the month of July.
- Lindsay Whalen was named WNBA Western Conference Player of the Month for the month of August.
- Maya Moore was named WNBA Rookie of the Month for the month of July.
- Maya Moore was named WNBA Rookie of the Month for the month of August.
- Seimone Augustus was named to the 2011 WNBA All-Star Team as a reserve.
- Rebekkah Brunson was named to the 2011 WNBA All-Star Team as a reserve.
- Maya Moore was named to the 2011 WNBA All-Star Team as a starter.
- Lindsay Whalen was named to the 2011 WNBA All-Star Team as a reserve.
- Lindsay Whalen finished as a Peak Performer, averaging 5.9 assists per game.
- Rebekkah Brunson was named to the All-Defensive First Team.
- Maya Moore was named Rookie of the Year.
- Maya Moore was named to the All-Rookie Team.
- Lindsay Whalen was named to the All-WNBA First Team.
- Seimone Augustus was named to the All-WNBA Second Team.
- Cheryl Reeve was named Coach of the Year.
- Seimone Augustus was named Finals Most Valuable Player.
