= 2013 Minnesota Lynx season =

- WNBA champions
- Head coach: Cheryl Reeve
- Arena: Target Center

Results
- Record: 26–8 (.765)
- Place: 1st (Western)
- Playoff finish: WNBA Champions (defeated Atlanta 3–0)

Media
- Television: Fox Sports North; ESPN2, NBATV
- Radio: KLCI

The 2013 Minnesota Lynx season was the 15th season for the Minnesota Lynx of the Women's National Basketball Association, and the 4th season under head coach Cheryl Reeve.

The Lynx won their second WNBA championship in three years, and led the league in wins for the third straight season.

The Lynx entered the season as the two-time defending Western Conference champions. The Lynx won the 2011 WNBA Finals, but lost the 2012 WNBA Finals to the Indiana Fever.

The 2012 season saw the retirement of veteran center Taj McWilliams-Franklin. The Lynx replaced her in the offseason, trading guard Candice Wiggins for former University of Minnesota standout Janel McCarville, who had played with Lynx point guard Lindsay Whalen in college.

Despite returning three olympians and an all-star in their starting lineup, the Lynx were considered something of an afterthought going into the season, with much of the press going to the Phoenix Mercury, which drafted Brittney Griner.

Despite the lowered expectations, the Lynx had another outstanding season, finishing with the best record in the WNBA for the third straight year, and placing four players in the WNBA All-Star Game. After dispatching the Seattle Storm in the opening round of the playoffs, the Lynx swept the Phoenix Mercury in the Western Conference Finals, to earn their third straight trip to the WNBA Finals. They then defeated the Atlanta Dream to win their second WNBA title in three years.

== Transactions ==
=== WNBA draft ===
The following are the Lynx' selections in the 2013 WNBA draft.

Round	Pick	Player	Nationality	School/team/country
1	12	Lindsey Moore	United States	Nebraska
2	14 (From Phx.)	Sugar Rodgers	United States	Georgetown
2	24	Chucky Jeffery	United States	Colorado
3	36	Waltiea Rolle	United States	North Carolina

=== Trades ===
On March 1, 2013, the Lynx announced that they had traded Candice Wiggins to the Tulsa Shock in exchange for a third-round pick in the draft and the rights to Janel McCarville from the New York Liberty.

Date	Trade	
March 1, 2013	To Minnesota Lynx	To Tulsa Shock
March 1, 2013	Janel McCarville	Candice Wiggins

=== Personnel changes ===
==== Additions ====
Player	Signed	Former team
Rachel Jarry	February 16, 2013	Unsigned Draftee
Janel McCarville	March 1, 2013	New York Liberty
Jacki Gemelos	April 1, 2013	Unsigned Draftee
Lindsey Moore	April 15, 2013	Draft Pick
Sugar Rodgers	April 15, 2013	Draft Pick

==== Subtractions ====
Player	Left	New team
Candice Wiggins	March 1, 2013	Tulsa Shock
Erin Thorn	January 11, 2013	Released
Taj McWilliams-Franklin	March 22, 2013	Retired
Jessica Adair	May 16, 2013	Released
Jacki Gemelos	May 22, 2013	Released

== Roster ==
2013 Minnesota Lynx roster
Players
Coaches

Pos.	No.	Nat.	Name	Height	Weight	DOB	From	Yrs
G/F	33	(United States)	Augustus, Seimone	6' 0" (1.83m)	165 lb (75kg)	1984-04-30	LSU	7
F	32	(United States)	Brunson, Rebekkah	6' 2" (1.88m)	184 lb (83kg)	1981-12-11	Georgetown	9
F	6	(United States)	Harris, Amber	6' 5" (1.96m)	202 lb (92kg)	1988-01-16	Xavier	2
G	12	(Australia)	Jarry, Rachel	6' 1" (1.85m)	176 lb (80kg)	1991-12-06	Australia	R
C	4	(United States)	McCarville, Janel	6' 2" (1.88m)	205 lb (93kg)	1982-11-03	Minnesota	7
G	00	(United States)	Moore, Lindsey	5' 8" (1.73m)	153 lb (69kg)	1991-06-03	Nebraska	R
F	23	(United States)	Moore, Maya	6' 0" (1.83m)	175 lb (79kg)	1989-06-11	Connecticut	2
F	14	(United States)	Peters, Devereaux	6' 2" (1.88m)	170 lb (77kg)	1989-10-08	Notre Dame	1
G	15	(United States)	Rodgers, Sugar	5' 9" (1.75m)	160 lb (73kg)	1989-12-08	Georgetown	R
G	13	(United States)	Whalen, Lindsay	5' 9" (1.75m)	160 lb (73kg)	1982-05-09	Minnesota	9
G/F	22	(United States)	Wright, Monica	5' 10" (1.78m)	171 lb (78kg)	1988-07-15	Virginia	3

Head coach
(United States) Cheryl Reeve (La Salle)
Assistant coaches
(United States) Shelley Patterson (Washington State)
(United States) Jim Petersen (Minnesota)
Athletic trainer
(United States) Chuck Barta (UW–La Crosse)
Assistant trainer
(United States) Keith Uzpen (Minnesota State)

Legend

- (C) Team captain
- (DP) Unsigned draft pick
- (FA) Free agent
- (S) Suspended
- Injured

=== Depth ===
Pos.	Starter	Bench
C	Janel McCarville	Amber Harris
PF	Rebekkah Brunson	Devereaux Peters
SF	Maya Moore	Rachel Jarry
SG	Seimone Augustus	Monica Wright; Sugar Rodgers
PG	Lindsay Whalen	Lindsey Moore

== Season standings ==
#	Western Conference					
#	Team	W	L	PCT	GB	GP
1	z-Minnesota Lynx	26	8	.765	-	34
2	x-Los Angeles Sparks	24	10	.706	2	34
3	x-Phoenix Mercury	19	15	.559	7	34
4	x-Seattle Storm	17	17	.500	9	34
5	e-San Antonio Silver Stars	12	22	.353	14	34
6	e-Tulsa Shock	11	23	.324	15	34

== Schedule ==
=== Preseason ===
2013 pre-season game log
Total: 1–1 (Home: 1–1; Road: 0–0)
Pre-season: 1–1 (Home: 1–1; Road: 0–0)

Game	Date	Team	Score	High points	High rebounds	High assists	Location Attendance	Record
1	May 18	Washington	W 74–57	Monica Wright (16)	Rebekkah Brunson (6)	Monica Wright (4)	Bismarck Civic Center; 1513	1–0
2	May 21	Connecticut	L 80–88	Seimone Augustus (15)	Rebekkah Brunson (10)	Lindsay Whalen (8)	Target Center; 2803	1–1

2013 season schedule

=== Regular season ===
2013 game log
Total: 26–8 (Home: 15–2; Road: 11–6)
May: 0–0 (Home: 0–0; Road: 0–0)

Game	Date	Team	Score	High points	High rebounds	High assists	Location Attendance	Record

June : 7–2 (Home: 5–0; Road: 2–2)

Game	Date	Team	Score	High points	High rebounds	High assists	Location Attendance	Record
1	June 1	Connecticut	W 90–74	Maya Moore (26)	M. Moore & Peters (7)	M. Moore & Wright (5)	Target Center; 9223	1–0
2	June 6	Phoenix	W 99–79	Maya Moore (22)	Rebekkah Brunson (10)	Lindsay Whalen (10)	Target Center; 8511	2–0
3	June 8	@ Washington	L 80–85	Maya Moore (22)	Rebekkah Brunson (17)	Lindsay Whalen (9)	Verizon Center; 7870	2–1
4	June 11	San Antonio	W 87–72	Lindsay Whalen (23)	Maya Moore (9)	Lindsay Whalen (6)	Target Center; 7913	3–1
5	June 14	@ Tulsa	W 83–74	Rebekkah Brunson (19)	Rebekkah Brunson (13)	Augustus & M. Moore (4)	BOK Center; 5273	4–1
6	June 19	@ Phoenix	W 80–69	Maya Moore (26)	Maya Moore (16)	Maya Moore (5)	US Airways Center; 8464	5–1
7	June 21	@ Los Angeles	L 59–87	Monica Wright (14)	Sugar Rodgers (6)	Harris & Wright (3)	Staples Center; 6490	5–2
8	June 23	Tulsa	W 88–79	Augustus & M. Moore (22)	Rebekkah Brunson (11)	Lindsay Whalen (9)	Target Center; 8423	6–2
9	June 28	Los Angeles	W 88–64	Lindsay Whalen (20)	Brunson, M. Moore, & Peters (9)	Lindsay Whalen (6)	Target Center; 8814	7–2

July : 7–1 (Home: 3–0; Road: 4–1)

Game	Date	Team	Score	High points	High rebounds	High assists	Location Attendance	Record
10	July 2	@ Los Angeles	L 66–96	Lindsay Whalen (19)	Rebekkah Brunson (12)	Lindsay Whalen (4)	Staples Center; 7856	7–3
11	July 7	Phoenix	W 91–59	Maya Moore (23)	Devereaux Peters (10)	Maya Moore (5)	Target Center; 9104	8–3
12	July 9	Atlanta	W 94–72	Monica Wright (22)	Rebekkah Brunson (12)	Whalen & Wright (5)	Target Center; 8623	9–3
13	July 11	@ Indiana	W 69–62	Lindsay Whalen (23)	Monica Wright (9)	Monica Wright (4)	Bankers Life Fieldhouse; 10230	10–3
14	July 13	@ Tulsa	W 86–75	Lindsay Whalen (25)	Rebekkah Brunson (12)	Lindsay Whalen (11)	BOK Center; 6171	11–3
15	July 19	@ San Antonio	W 87–71	Lindsay Whalen (21)	Maya Moore (8)	Lindsay Whalen (7)	AT&T Center; 7105	12–3
16	July 21	@ Phoenix	W 82–77	Rebekkah Brunson (18)	Rebekkah Brunson (13)	Augustus & McCarville (4)	US Airways Center; 9806	13–3
17	July 24	Phoenix	W 81–69	Lindsay Whalen (18)	Rebekkah Brunson (7)	Lindsay Whalen (7)	Target Center; 16404	14–3

August : 8–4 (Home: 5–2; Road: 3–2)

Game	Date	Team	Score	High points	High rebounds	High assists	Location Attendance	Record
All-Star Break
18	August 2	San Antonio	W 85–63	Seimone Augustus (18)	Rebekkah Brunson (12)	Lindsay Whalen (8)	Target Center; 8733	15–3
19	August 4	Seattle	W 90–72	Lindsay Whalen (22)	Rebekkah Brunson (11)	McCarville & Whalen (7)	Target Center; 9032	16–3
20	August 6	@ San Antonio	W 93–80	Maya Moore (26)	Maya Moore (10)	Lindsay Whalen (10)	AT&T Center; 5390	17–3
21	August 8	Washington	L 75–79	Maya Moore (24)	Rebekkah Brunson (7)	Lindsay Whalen (5)	Target Center; 8723	17–4
22	August 11	@ Chicago	L 86–94 (OT)	Seimone Augustus (26)	Lindsay Whalen (10)	Augustus & Whalen (6)	Allstate Arena; 6297	17–5
23	August 16	Tulsa	L 77–83	Seimone Augustus (29)	Devereaux Peters (8)	Lindsay Whalen (6)	Target Center; 9422	17–6
24	August 18	NY Liberty	W 88–57	Maya Moore (28)	Rebekkah Brunson (8)	Lindsay Whalen (7)	Target Center; 9004	18–6
25	August 20	@ Atlanta	L 75–88	Maya Moore (23)	Rebekkah Brunson (14)	Lindsay Whalen (6)	Philips Arena; 4855	18–7
26	August 22	@ Connecticut	W 91–77	Rebekkah Brunson (24)	Rebekkah Brunson (11)	Seimone Augustus (6)	Mohegan Sun Arena; 7088	19–7
27	August 24	Indiana	W 84–77	Maya Moore (35)	Lindsay Whalen (9)	Lindsay Whalen (7)	Target Center; 9504	20–7
28	August 27	@ NY Liberty	W 73–47	Lindsay Whalen (18)	Maya Moore (10)	Seimone Augustus (3)	Prudential Center; 5997	21–7
29	August 31	Seattle	W 97–74	Maya Moore (30)	Monica Wright (6)	Monica Wright (7)	Target Center; 9123	22–7

September : 4–1 (Home: 2–0; Road: 2–1)

Game	Date	Team	Score	High points	High rebounds	High assists	Location Attendance	Record
30	September 4	Los Angeles	W 83–74	Seimone Augustus (23)	Rebekkah Brunson (11)	Lindsay Whalen (14)	Target Center; 9314	23–7
31	September 7	@ Seattle	W 75–60	Rebekkah Brunson (19)	McCarville & Peters (10)	McCarville & Whalen (4)	Key Arena; 8147	24–7
32	September 10	@ Seattle	W 73–60	Maya Moore (20)	Rebekkah Brunson (8)	Lindsay Whalen (4)	Key Arena; 5486	25–7
33	September 12	@ Los Angeles	L 84–85	Seimone Augustus (23)	Rebekkah Brunson (11)	Whalen & Wright (4)	Staples Center; 11553	25–8
34	September 14	Chicago	W 79–66	Lindsay Whalen (23)	Maya Moore (11)	M. Moore & Whalen (6)	Target Center; 9613	26–8

2013 season schedule

=== Playoffs ===
2013 playoff game log
Total: 7–0 (Home: 4–0; Road: 3–0)
Conference Semifinals: 2–0 (Home: 1–0; Road: 1–0)

Game	Date	Team	Score	High points	High rebounds	High assists	Location Attendance	Series
1	September 20	Seattle	W 80–64	Seimone Augustus (19)	Rebekkah Brunson (9)	Maya Moore (6)	Target Center; 8832	1–0
2	September 22	@ Seattle	W 58–55	Maya Moore (22)	Rebekkah Brunson (13)	Janel McCarville (5)	Tacoma Dome; 3457	2–0

Conference Finals: 2–0 (Home: 1–0; Road: 1–0)

Game	Date	Team	Score	High points	High rebounds	High assists	Location Attendance	Series
1	September 26	Phoenix	W 85–62	M. Moore and Whalen (20)	Lindsay Whalen (6)	Lindsay Whalen (5)	Target Center; 9013	1-0
2	September 29	@ Phoenix	W 72–65	Maya Moore (27)	Rebekkah Brunson (14)	Lindsay Whalen (7)	US Airways Center; 8020	2-0

WNBA Finals: 3–0 (Home: 2–0; Road: 1–0)

Game	Date	Team	Score	High points	High rebounds	High assists	Location Attendance	Series
1	October 6	Atlanta	W 84–59	Maya Moore (23)	Rebekkah Brunson (8)	Lindsay Whalen (5)	Target Center; 13804	1-0
2	October 8	Atlanta	W 88–63	Seimone Augustus (20)	Rebekkah Brunson (10)	Lindsay Whalen (5)	Target Center; 12313	2-0
3	October 10	@ Atlanta	W 86–77	Maya Moore (23)	Rebekkah Brunson (12)	Lindsay Whalen (6)	Gwinnett Arena; 5040	3-0

2013 season schedule

== Statistics ==
Legend
GP	Games played	GS	Games started	MPG	Minutes per game	RPG	Rebounds per game
APG	Assists per game	SPG	Steals per game	BPG	Blocks per game	PPG	Points per game
FG%	Field-goal percentage	3P%	3-point field-goal percentage	FT%	Free-throw percentage	TO	Turnovers per game
PF	Fouls per game		Team leader		League leader

=== Regular season ===
Player	GP	GS	MPG	FG%	3P%	FT%	RPG	APG	SPG	BPG	PPG
Seimone Augustus	31	31	29.8	.516	.290	.879	3.20	2.5	0.58	0.58	16.3
Rebekkah Brunson	33	33	29.2	.497	1.000	.636	8.90	1.5	1.27	0.88	10.6
Amber Harris	30	1	8.8	.375	.143	.714	1.50	0.7	0.13	0.20	2.4
Rachel Jarry	27	0	6.8	.444	.600	.778	0.70	0.4	0.19	0.15	1.7
Janel McCarville	32	32	21.9	.488	.429	.804	4.30	2.9	1.00	0.66	6.3
Lindsey Moore	23	0	5.7	.258	.250	.750	0.60	1.0	0.13	0.00	1.0
Maya Moore	34	34	31.4	.509	.453	.882	6.20	3.0	1.74	0.97	18.5
Devereaux Peters	34	2	18.6	.396	.000	.852	4.60	1.1	0.71	1.00	4.1
Sugar Rodgers	28	0	7.6	.317	.313	.571	1.40	0.5	0.54	0.32	1.9
Lindsay Whalen	34	34	29.6	.486	.111	.783	4.40	5.8	0.76	0.06	14.9
Monica Wright	33	3	22.5	.428	.256	.791	2.90	2.30	1.03	0.18	9.0

== Awards and honors ==
WNBA Champions

WNBA Finals MVP - Maya Moore

All-WNBA First Team - Maya Moore, Lindsay Whalen

All-WNBA Second Team - Seimone Augustus

All-WNBA Defensive Second Team - Rebekkah Brunson

WNBA Western Conference Player of the Month (August) - Maya Moore

WNBA Western Conference Player of the Month (September) - Maya Moore

WNBA Player of the Week - Maya Moore (3 times), Rebekkah Brunson

WNBA All-Stars - Seimone Augustus, Maya Moore, Rebekkah Brunson, Lindsay Whalen

WNBA Record for Fewest Turnovers per Game (12.1)
