= 2013 WNBA Finals =

Women's basketball championship series

Team	Coach	Wins
Minnesota Lynx	Cheryl Reeve	3
Atlanta Dream	Fred Williams	0
- Dates: October 6–10
- MVP: Maya Moore Minnesota
- Hall of Famers: Lynx: Maya Moore (2025); Seimone Augustus (2024); Lindsay Whalen (2022)
- Eastern finals: Atlanta defeated Indiana, 2–0
- Western finals: Minnesota defeated Phoenix, 2–0

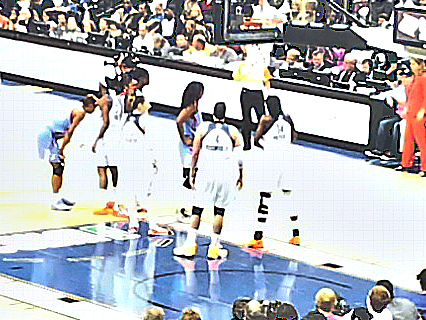
Game 1 of the 2013 Finals

The 2013 WNBA Finals was the playoff series for the 2013 season of the Women's National Basketball Association (WNBA), and the conclusion of the season's playoffs. The Minnesota Lynx, champions of the Western Conference, defeated the Atlanta Dream, champions of the Eastern Conference.

The WNBA Finals were under a 2–2–1 rotation. The Lynx held home-court advantage as they had a better regular season record (26–8) than the Dream (17–17). The meeting is a rematch of the 2011 WNBA Finals, in which the Lynx defeated the Dream in three games.

The Lynx won the first game of the series 84–59, and the second 88–63. They finished the sweep with an 86–77 win in Atlanta, becoming the second WNBA team to sweep through the playoffs since the best-of-five finals format was adopted.

== Background ==
=== 2013 WNBA regular season ===
#	Eastern Conference					
#	Team	W	L	PCT	GB	GP
1	z-Chicago Sky	24	10	.706	-	34
2	x-Atlanta Dream	17	17	.500	7	34
3	x-Washington Mystics	17	17	.500	7	34
4	x-Indiana Fever	16	18	.471	8	34
5	e-New York Liberty	11	23	.324	13	34
6	e-Connecticut Sun	10	24	.294	14	34

#	Western Conference					
#	Team	W	L	PCT	GB	GP
1	z-Minnesota Lynx	26	8	.765	-	34
2	x-Los Angeles Sparks	24	10	.706	2	34
3	x-Phoenix Mercury	19	15	.559	7	34
4	x-Seattle Storm	17	17	.500	9	34
5	e-San Antonio Silver Stars	12	22	.353	14	34
6	e-Tulsa Shock	11	23	.324	15	34

=== 2013 WNBA playoffs ===
Minnesota Lynx		Atlanta Dream
26–8 (.765); 1st West, 1st overall	Seeding	17–17 (.500); 2nd East, 6th overall
Defeated the (4) Seattle Storm, 2–0	Conference Semifinals	Defeated the (3) Washington Mystics, 2–1
Defeated the (3) Phoenix Mercury, 2–0	Conference Finals	Defeated the (4) Indiana Fever, 2–0

=== Atlanta Dream ===
The Atlanta Dream finished 17-17, good for second place in the Eastern Conference. They defeated the Washington Mystics in three games in the conference semifinals, and swept fourth-seeded Indiana, the defending WNBA champions, who had upset the top seed, the Chicago Sky, in the first round.

The Dream featured Angel McCoughtry, who won her second consecutive scoring title in 2013, as well as Brazilian center Erika de Souza. However, the Dream played the Finals without Sancho Lyttle, who had gone down with an injury during the season.

=== Minnesota Lynx ===
The Minnesota Lynx finished with the best record in the WNBA for the third straight year.. The Lynx swept both fourth-seeded Seattle and pre-season favorites Phoenix to win their third consecutive Western Conference crown.

The Lynx returned their core nucleus of Seimone Augustus, Rebekkah Brunson, Maya Moore, and Lindsay Whalen, all of whom played on the Lynx's 2011 championship team.

=== Regular-season series ===
The season series was tied, 1-1:

July 9, 2013

Report

Atlanta Dream 72, Minnesota Lynx 94

Target Center, Minneapolis, MN

August 20, 2013

Report

Minnesota Lynx 75, Atlanta Dream 88

Philips Arena, Atlanta, GA

== Series summary ==
All times are in Eastern Daylight Time (UTC−4).

=== Game 1 ===
The Minnesota Lynx came out determined not to lose game one at home as they had in the 2012 WNBA Finals. Maya Moore led the Lynx with 23 points, and Monica Wright added 20 off the bench as the Lynx cruised past the Dream 84–59. Angel McCoughtry led the Dream with 17 points.

ESPN

October 6
8:30pm ET

Report

Atlanta Dream 59, Minnesota Lynx 84
Scoring by quarter: 16–24, 9–20, 18–24, 16–16
Pts: Angel McCoughtry 17; Rebs: Aneika Henry 14; Asts: Armintie Herrington 3	Pts: Maya Moore 23; Rebs: Rebekkah Brunson 8 Asts: Lindsay Whalen 5
Minnesota leads series, 1–0

Target Center, Minneapolis, MN
Attendance: 13,804
Referees: Michael Price, Cameron Inouye, Kurt Walker

=== Game 2 ===
The Lynx came out on fire in Game 2, opening up an 11-point lead after the first quarter that they would never relinquish. Seimone Augustus led the Lynx in scoring with 20 points, and all five starters finished the game in double figures. Angel McCoughtry was hampered by foul trouble throughout the night, and ultimately fouled out in the fourth quarter.

ESPN2

October 8
8:00pm ET

Report

Atlanta Dream 63, Minnesota Lynx 88
Scoring by quarter: 16-27, 20-24, 16-17, 11-20
Pts: Angel McCoughtry 15; Rebs: Aneika Henry 6 Asts: Angel McCoughtry 4	Pts: Seimone Augustus 20; Rebs: Rebekkah Brunson 10; Asts: Lindsay Whalen 5
Minnesota leads series, 2–0

Target Center, Minneapolis, MN
Attendance: 12,313
Referees: Eric Brewton, Sue Blauch, Daryl Humphrey

=== Game 3 ===
The Lynx opened up an 8-point lead at the end of the first quarter, but Atlanta battled back several times, cutting the lead to 3 at halftime. Ultimately, however, the balanced attack of Minnesota was simply too much for the Dream to overcome; the Lynx won 86–77, earning their second WNBA title in three years, and becoming the second WNBA team to sweep the playoffs. Maya Moore of the Lynx was named WNBA Finals MVP.

ESPN2

October 10
8:30pm ET

Report

Minnesota Lynx 86, Atlanta Dream 77
Scoring by quarter: 25–17, 15–20, 26–19, 20–21
Pts: Maya Moore 23; Rebs: Rebekkah Brunson 12; Asts: Lindsay Whalen 6	Pts: Tiffany Hayes 20; Rebs: Érika de Souza 9 Asts: Alex Bentley 6
Minnesota wins WNBA Finals, 3–0

Arena at Gwinnett Center, Duluth, GA
Attendance: 5040
Referees: Lamont Simpson, Denise Brooks, Brenda Pantoja

== Rosters ==
2013 Minnesota Lynx roster
Players
Coaches

Pos.	No.	Nat.	Name	Height	Weight	DOB	From	Yrs
G/F	33	(United States)	Augustus, Seimone	6' 0" (1.83m)	165 lb (75kg)	1984-04-30	LSU	7
F	32	(United States)	Brunson, Rebekkah	6' 2" (1.88m)	184 lb (83kg)	1981-12-11	Georgetown	9
F	11	(United States)	Harris, Amber	6' 5" (1.96m)	202 lb (92kg)	1988-01-16	Xavier	2
G	12	(Australia)	Jarry, Rachel	6' 1" (1.85m)	176 lb (80kg)	1991-12-06	Australia	R
C	4	(United States)	McCarville, Janel	6' 2" (1.88m)	205 lb (93kg)	1982-11-03	Minnesota	7
G	00	(United States)	Moore, Lindsey	5' 8" (1.73m)	153 lb (69kg)	1991-06-03	Nebraska	R
F	23	(United States)	Moore, Maya	6' 0" (1.83m)	175 lb (79kg)	1989-06-11	Connecticut	2
F	14	(United States)	Peters, Devereaux	6' 2" (1.88m)	170 lb (77kg)	1989-10-08	Notre Dame	1
G	15	(United States)	Rodgers, Sugar	5' 9" (1.75m)	160 lb (73kg)	1989-12-08	Georgetown	R
G	13	(United States)	Whalen, Lindsay	5' 9" (1.75m)	160 lb (73kg)	1982-05-09	Minnesota	9
G/F	22	(United States)	Wright, Monica	5' 10" (1.78m)	171 lb (78kg)	1988-07-15	Virginia	3

Head coach
(United States) Cheryl Reeve (La Salle)
Assistant coaches
(United States) Shelley Patterson (Washington State)
(United States) Jim Petersen (Minnesota)
Athletic trainer
(United States) Chuck Barta (UW–La Crosse)
Assistant trainer
(United States) Keith Uzpen (Minnesota State)

Legend

- (C) Team captain
- (DP) Unsigned draft pick
- (FA) Free agent
- (S) Suspended
- Injured

2013 Atlanta Dream roster
Players
Coaches

Pos.	No.	Nat.	Name	Height	Weight	DOB	From	Yrs
G	2	(United States)	Bentley, Alex	5' 7" (1.7m)	152 lb (69kg)	1990-10-27	Penn State	R
G	54	(United States)	Clements, Courtney	6' 0" (1.83m)	155 lb (70kg)	1989-11-12	San Diego State	R
F/C	14	(Brazil)	de Souza, Erika	6' 5" (1.96m)	190 lb (86kg)	1982-03-03	Brazil	7
G	15	(United States)	Hayes, Tiffany	5' 10" (1.78m)	155 lb (70kg)	1989-09-20	Connecticut	1
F	13	(Jamaica)	Henry, Aneika	6' 3" (1.91m)	205 lb (93kg)	1986-02-13	Florida	1
G/F	22	(United States)	Herrington, Armintie	5' 9" (1.75m)	133 lb (60kg)	1985-04-03	Mississippi	6
C	11	(Belarus)	Leuchanka, Yelena	6' 5" (1.96m)	195 lb (88kg)	1983-04-30	West Virginia	4
F	20	(Spain)	Lyttle, Sancho (injured)	6' 4" (1.93m)	175 lb (79kg)	1983-09-20	Houston	8
F	35	(United States)	McCoughtry, Angel	6' 1" (1.85m)	160 lb (73kg)	1986-09-10	Louisville	4
F/C	00	(United States)	Riley, Ruth	6' 5" (1.96m)	198 lb (90kg)	1979-11-28	Notre Dame	13
G	5	(United States)	Thomas, Jasmine	5' 9" (1.75m)	145 lb (66kg)	1989-09-30	Duke	2
F	43	(United States)	Willingham, Le'Coe	6' 0" (1.83m)	200 lb (91kg)	1981-02-10	Auburn	9

Head coach
(United States) Fred Williams (Boise State)
Assistant coaches
(United States) Joe Ciampi (Mansfield)
(United States) Julie Plank (Ohio State)
Athletic trainer
(United States) Kim Mosely (Southern Miss)
Strength and conditioning coach
(United States) Dustin Wolf (Tennessee)

Legend

- (C) Team captain
- (DP) Unsigned draft pick
- (FA) Free agent
- (S) Suspended
- Injured
