= 2012 WNBA Finals =

2012 women's basketball championship series

Team	Coach	Wins
Indiana Fever	Lin Dunn	3
Minnesota Lynx	Cheryl Reeve	1
- Dates: October 14 – 21
- MVP: (United States) Tamika Catchings
- Hall of Famers: Fever: Tamika Catchings (2020); Lynx: Maya Moore (2025); Seimone Augustus (2024); Lindsay Whalen (2022)
- Eastern finals: Indiana defeated Connecticut, 2–1
- Western finals: Minnesota defeated Los Angeles, 2–0

The 2012 WNBA Finals was the series for the 2012 season of the Women's National Basketball Association (WNBA), and the conclusion of the season's playoffs. The Minnesota Lynx, champions of the Western Conference, faced the Indiana Fever, champions of the Eastern Conference. The Fever defeated the Lynx three games to one becoming only the second Eastern Conference franchise to capture a WNBA title.

The WNBA Finals were under a 2–2–1 rotation. The Lynx held home-court advantage as they had a better regular season record (27–7) than the Fever (22–12). The Lynx were defending their 2011 WNBA Championship. The Fever appeared in the 2009 Finals.

== Background ==
=== 2012 WNBA regular season ===
Eastern Conference	W	L	PCT	GB	Home	Road	Conf.
Connecticut Sun ^{y}	25	9	.735	–	12–5	13–4	18–4
Indiana Fever ^{x}	22	12	.647	3.0	13–4	9–8	15–7
Atlanta Dream ^{x}	19	15	.559	6.0	11–6	8–9	12–10
New York Liberty ^{x}	15	19	.441	10.0	9–8	6–11	10–12
Chicago Sky ^{o}	14	20	.412	11.0	7–10	7–10	8–14
Washington Mystics ^{o}	5	29	.147	20.0	4–13	1–16	3–19

Western Conference	W	L	PCT	GB	Home	Road	Conf.
Minnesota Lynx ^{z}	27	7	.794	–	16–1	11–6	17–5
Los Angeles Sparks ^{x}	24	10	.706	3.0	16–1	8–9	15–7
San Antonio Silver Stars ^{x}	21	13	.618	6.0	12–5	9–8	14–8
Seattle Storm ^{x}	16	18	.471	11.0	10–7	6–11	11–11
Tulsa Shock ^{o}	9	25	.265	18.0	6–11	3–14	5–17
Phoenix Mercury ^{o}	7	27	.206	20.0	3–14	4–13	4–18

=== 2012 WNBA playoffs ===
Minnesota Lynx		Indiana Fever
27–7 (.794); 1st West, 1st overall	Seeding	22–12 (.647); 2nd East, 4th overall
Defeated the (4) Seattle Storm, 2–1	Conference Semifinals	Defeated the (3) Atlanta Dream, 2–1
Defeated the (2) Los Angeles Sparks, 2–0	Conference Finals	Defeated the (1) Connecticut Sun, 2–1

=== Indiana Fever ===
The Indiana Fever finished 22–12, good for second place in the Eastern Conference. The Fever lost their first playoff game against the Atlanta Dream, but rallied to win two straight elimination games, setting up a conference final against the Connecticut Sun. Once again, Indiana lost the first game of the series, but rallied to win two straight to reach the finals for the second time in four years.

=== Minnesota Lynx ===
The Minnesota Lynx finished with the best record in the WNBA for the second straight year, finishing with a 27–7 record. The Lynx were taken to three games by the Seattle Storm, winning Game 3 by one point. The Lynx then swept the Los Angeles Sparks in the Western Conference Finals, which gave them a chance to defend their 2011 WNBA title.

=== Regular-season series ===
The Minnesota Lynx won the season series 2–0:

September 14, 2012

Report

Minnesota Lynx 66, Indiana Fever 64

Bankers Life Fieldhouse, Indianapolis, IN

September 17, 2012

Report

Indiana Fever 79, Minnesota Lynx 86

Target Center, Minneapolis, MN

== Series summary ==
Game	Date	Home team	Result	Road team
Game 1	October 14	Minnesota Lynx	70–76 (0–1)	Indiana Fever
Game 2	October 17	Minnesota Lynx	83–71 (1–1)	Indiana Fever
Game 3	October 19	Indiana Fever	76–59 (2–1)	Minnesota Lynx
Game 4	October 21	Indiana Fever	87–78 (3–1)	Minnesota Lynx

== Game summaries ==
All times are in Eastern Daylight Time (UTC−4).

=== Game 1 ===
ESPN2

October 14
8:00pm ET

Recap

Indiana Fever 76, Minnesota Lynx 70
Scoring by quarter: 25–20, 18–20, 13–18, 20–12
Pts: Catchings (20); Rebs: Larkins (15); Asts: January (6)	Pts: Augustus (23); Rebs: Brunson, Moore (10); Asts: Whalen (4)
Indiana leads series, 1–0

Target Center, Minneapolis, MN
Attendance: 14,322
Referees: Sue Blauch, Kurt Walker, Tom Mauer

=== Game 2 ===
ESPN

October 17
8:00pm ET

Recap

Indiana Fever 71, Minnesota Lynx 83
Scoring by quarter: 18–11, 15–20, 22–29, 16–23
Pts: Catchings (27); Rebs: Catchings (8); Asts: Phillips (4)	Pts: Augustus (27); Rebs: Brunson (7); Asts: McWilliams-Franklin, Moore, Whalen (4)
Series tied, 1–1

Target Center, Minneapolis, MN
Attendance: 13,478
Referees: Michael Price, Roy Gulbeyan, Brenda Pantoja

=== Game 3 ===
ESPN2

October 19
8:00pm ET

Report

Minnesota Lynx 59, Indiana Fever 76
Scoring by quarter: 16–21, 11–24, 11–25, 21–6
Pts: Brunson (12); Rebs: Brunson (9); Asts: Wiggins (3)	Pts: Zellous (30); Rebs: Larkins (12); Asts: Davenport (4)
Indiana leads series, 2–1

Bankers Life Fieldhouse, Indianapolis, IN
Attendance: 18,165
Referees: Denise Brooks, Lamont Simpson, Eric Brewton

=== Game 4 ===
ESPN2

October 21
8:00pm ET

Report

Minnesota Lynx 78, Indiana Fever 87
Scoring by quarter: 18–25, 24–22, 16–18, 20–24
Pts: Whalen (22); Rebs: Augustus (7); Asts: Whalen (8)	Pts: Catchings (28); Rebs: Larkins (13); Asts: Catchings (8)
Indiana wins WNBA Finals, 3–1

Bankers Life Fieldhouse, Indianapolis, IN
Attendance: 15,213
Referees: Sue Blauch, Michael Price, Roy Gulbeyan

External videos
- Full game broadcast by ESPN2 on YouTube

== Rosters ==
2012 Minnesota Lynx roster
Players
Coaches

Pos.	No.	Nat.	Name	Height	Weight	DOB	From	Yrs
C	1	(United States)	Adair, Jessica	6' 4" (1.93m)	197 lb (89kg)	1986-12-19	George Washington	2
G/F	33	(United States)	Augustus, Seimone	6' 0" (1.83m)	165 lb (75kg)	1984-04-30	LSU	6
F	32	(United States)	Brunson, Rebekkah	6' 2" (1.88m)	184 lb (83kg)	1981-12-11	Georgetown	8
F	6	(United States)	Harris, Amber	6' 5" (1.96m)	202 lb (92kg)	1988-01-16	Xavier	1
F/C	8	(United States)	McWilliams-Franklin, Taj	6' 2" (1.88m)	195 lb (88kg)	1970-08-20	St. Edward's	13
F	23	(United States)	Moore, Maya	6' 0" (1.83m)	175 lb (79kg)	1989-06-11	Connecticut	1
F	14	(United States)	Peters, Devereaux	6' 2" (1.88m)	170 lb (77kg)	1989-10-08	Notre Dame	R
G	5	(United States)	Thorn, Erin	5' 9" (1.75m)	145 lb (66kg)	1981-05-19	BYU	9
G	13	(United States)	Whalen, Lindsay	5' 9" (1.75m)	160 lb (73kg)	1982-05-09	Minnesota	8
G	11	(United States)	Wiggins, Candice	5' 11" (1.8m)	147 lb (67kg)	1987-02-14	Stanford	4
G/F	22	(United States)	Wright, Monica	5' 10" (1.78m)	171 lb (78kg)	1988-07-15	Virginia	2

Head coach
(United States) Cheryl Reeve (La Salle)
Assistant coaches
(United States) Shelley Patterson (Washington State)
(United States) Jim Petersen (Minnesota)
Athletic trainer
(United States) Chuck Barta (UW–La Crosse)
Assistant trainer
(United States) Keith Uzpen (Minnesota State)

Legend

- (C) Team captain
- (DP) Unsigned draft pick
- (FA) Free agent
- (S) Suspended
- Injured

2012 Indiana Fever roster
Players
Coaches

Pos.	No.	Nat.	Name	Height	Weight	DOB	From	Yrs
F	24	(United States)	Catchings, Tamika	6' 1" (1.85m)	167 lb (76kg)	1979-07-21	Tennessee	10
G/F	11	(United States)	Christmas, Karima	6' 0" (1.83m)	180 lb (82kg)	1989-09-11	Duke	1
C	50	(United States)	Davenport, Jessica	6' 5" (1.96m)	215 lb (98kg)	1985-06-21	Ohio State	5
G/F	23	(United States)	Douglas, Katie	6' 0" (1.83m)	165 lb (75kg)	1979-05-07	Purdue	11
F	45	(United States)	Goodlett, Sasha	6' 5" (1.96m)	239 lb (108kg)	1990-08-09	Georgia Tech	R
G	20	(United States)	January, Briann	5' 8" (1.73m)	144 lb (65kg)	1987-01-11	Arizona State	3
F	2	(United States)	Larkins, Erlana	6' 1" (1.85m)	202 lb (92kg)	1986-04-02	North Carolina	2
G	13	(Australia)	Phillips, Erin	5' 8" (1.73m)	165 lb (75kg)	1985-05-19	Australia	4
G	32	(United States)	Pohlen, Jeanette	6' 0" (1.83m)	179 lb (81kg)	1989-05-02	Stanford	1
C	8	(Canada)	Sutton-Brown, Tammy	6' 4" (1.93m)	199 lb (90kg)	1978-01-27	Rutgers	11
G	1	(United States)	Zellous, Shavonte	5' 10" (1.78m)	155 lb (70kg)	1986-08-28	Pittsburgh	3

Head coach
(United States) Lin Dunn (UT Martin)
Assistant coaches
(United States) Mickie DeMoss (Louisiana Tech)
(United States) Stephanie White (Purdue)
Athletic trainer
(United States) Todd Champlin (Daemen)
Strength and conditioning coach
(United States) Emily Novitsky (Slippery Rock)

Legend

- (C) Team captain
- (DP) Unsigned draft pick
- (FA) Free agent
- (S) Suspended
- Injured
