= 2012 Minnesota Lynx season =

- Head coach: Cheryl Reeve
- Arena: Target Center

Results
- Record: 27–7 (.794)
- Place: 1st (Western)
- Playoff finish: WNBA Finals (lost to Fever 1–3)

Media
- Television: FS-N; ABC, ESPN, ESPN2, NBATV
- Radio: KLCI

The 2012 Minnesota Lynx season was the 14th season for the Minnesota Lynx of the Women's National Basketball Association, and the 3rd season under head coach Cheryl Reeve.

The Lynx were the defending WNBA Champions, having won the 2011 WNBA Finals over the Atlanta Dream. The Lynx qualified for the playoffs, and finished with the best record in the WNBA. On October 7, 2012, the Lynx won their second straight WNBA Western Conference championship, earning a spot in the 2012 WNBA Finals.

== Transactions ==
=== WNBA draft ===
The following are the Lynx' selections in the 2012 WNBA draft.

Round	Pick	Player	Nationality	School/team/country
1	3 (from Was.)	Devereaux Peters	United States	Notre Dame
1	12	Damiris Dantas	Brazil	Brazil
2	18 (from Pho.)	Julie Wojta	United States	Wisconsin-Green Bay
2	19 (from N.Y.)	Kayla Standish	United States	Gonzaga
2	20 (from Atl.)	Nika Barič	Slovenia	Merkur Celjie (Slovenia)
3	31 (from N.Y.)	Jacki Gemelos	United States	USC

=== Transaction log ===
- April 11, 2011: The Lynx acquired a second-round pick in the 2012 Draft from the Atlanta Dream as part of the Felicia Chester/Rachel Jarry transaction.
- April 11, 2011: The Lynx acquired a second-round pick in the 2012 Draft from the New York Liberty as part of the Jessica Breland trade.
- April 11, 2011: The Lynx acquired a first-round pick in the 2012 Draft from the Washington Mystics in exchange for Nicky Anosike.
- May 27, 2011: The Lynx swapped third-round picks in the 2012 Draft with the New York Liberty as part of the Quanitra Hollingsworth transaction.
- January 23: The Lynx re-signed Jessica Adair.
- January 26: The Lynx re-signed Taj McWilliams-Franklin.
- February 2: The Lynx traded Alexis Hornbuckle to the Phoenix Mercury in exchange for a second-round pick in the 2013 Draft.
- February 10: The Lynx re-signed Candice Wiggins.
- February 13: The Lynx signed Erin Thorn.
- February 28: The Lynx traded Charde Houston and the 24th pick in the 2012 Draft to the Phoenix Mercury in exchange for the 18th pick in the 2012 Draft.
- April 25: The Lynx signed Queralt Casas, Jasmine Lee, and Porsche Poole.
- April 26: The Lynx signed Tavelyn James and draft pick Julie Wojta.
- April 29: The Lynx signed Brittany Rayburn.
- May 2: The Lynx signed draft picks Devereaux Peters and Kayla Standish.
- May 6: The Lynx waived Jasmine Lee, Tavelyn James, and Kayla Standish.
- May 11: The Lynx waived Brittany Rayburn.
- May 16: The Lynx waived Queralt Casas and Julie Wojta.
- July 10: The Lynx signed Julie Wojta to a 7-day contract as an injury replacement.

=== Trades ===
Date	Trade	
February 2, 2012	To Minnesota Lynx	To Phoenix Mercury
February 2, 2012	Second-round pick in 2013 Draft	Alexis Hornbuckle
February 28, 2012	To Minnesota Lynx	To Phoenix Mercury
February 28, 2012	18th pick in 2012 Draft	Charde Houston and 24th pick in 2012 Draft

=== Personnel changes ===
==== Additions ====
Player	Signed	Former team
Erin Thorn	February 12, 2012	Chicago Sky
Devereaux Peters	April 16, 2012	draft pick
Julie Wojta	July 10, 2012	free agent

==== Subtractions ====
Player	Left	New team
Alexis Hornbuckle	February 2, 2012	Phoenix Mercury
Charde Houston	February 28, 2012	Phoenix Mercury
Julie Wojta	August 19, 2012	free agent

== Roster ==
2012 Minnesota Lynx roster
Players
Coaches

Pos.	No.	Nat.	Name	Height	Weight	DOB	From	Yrs
C	1	(United States)	Adair, Jessica	6' 4" (1.93m)	197 lb (89kg)	1986-12-19	George Washington	2
G/F	33	(United States)	Augustus, Seimone	6' 0" (1.83m)	165 lb (75kg)	1984-04-30	LSU	6
F	32	(United States)	Brunson, Rebekkah	6' 2" (1.88m)	184 lb (83kg)	1981-12-11	Georgetown	8
F	6	(United States)	Harris, Amber	6' 5" (1.96m)	202 lb (92kg)	1988-01-16	Xavier	1
F/C	8	(United States)	McWilliams-Franklin, Taj	6' 2" (1.88m)	195 lb (88kg)	1970-08-20	St. Edward's	13
F	23	(United States)	Moore, Maya	6' 0" (1.83m)	175 lb (79kg)	1989-06-11	Connecticut	1
F	14	(United States)	Peters, Devereaux	6' 2" (1.88m)	170 lb (77kg)	1989-10-08	Notre Dame	R
G	5	(United States)	Thorn, Erin	5' 9" (1.75m)	145 lb (66kg)	1981-05-19	BYU	9
G	13	(United States)	Whalen, Lindsay	5' 9" (1.75m)	160 lb (73kg)	1982-05-09	Minnesota	8
G	11	(United States)	Wiggins, Candice	5' 11" (1.8m)	147 lb (67kg)	1987-02-14	Stanford	4
G/F	22	(United States)	Wright, Monica	5' 10" (1.78m)	171 lb (78kg)	1988-07-15	Virginia	2

Head coach
(United States) Cheryl Reeve (La Salle)
Assistant coaches
(United States) Shelley Patterson (Washington State)
(United States) Jim Petersen (Minnesota)
Athletic trainer
(United States) Chuck Barta (UW–La Crosse)
Assistant trainer
(United States) Keith Uzpen (Minnesota State)

Legend

- (C) Team captain
- (DP) Unsigned draft pick
- (FA) Free agent
- (S) Suspended
- Injured

=== Depth ===
Pos.	Starter	Bench
C	Taj McWilliams-Franklin	Jessica Adair; Amber Harris
PF	Rebekkah Brunson	Devereaux Peters
SF	Maya Moore	Monica Wright
SG	Seimone Augustus	Candice Wiggins
PG	Lindsay Whalen	Erin Thorn

== Season summary ==
=== First Half of Season ===
Expectations were high for the Lynx as they opened the 2012 season. The team returned all five starters from their 2011 championship season, including four all-stars. Those expectations were matched through the early part of the season, as the team set the WNBA record with 10 consecutive wins to start the season, before losing to Seattle on June 17. The team then won two consecutive games to run their record to 12-1.

July proved to be a difficult month. The team lost three straight to start the month, and lost forwards Devereaux Peters and Rebekkah Brunson to injuries. The team signed guard Julie Wojta, who had been drafted by the team but cut after training camp, to a 7-day contract to provide depth. The Lynx rebounded by winning back-to-back games over the Tulsa Shock, and went into the Summer Olympic Break with a 15-4 record.

=== Olympics ===
Three members of the Lynx—Seimone Augustus, Maya Moore, and Lindsay Whalen—were members of the United States women's national basketball team for the 2012 Summer Olympics. The three players were the most contributed by any WNBA squad. The team won gold during the games, the second medal for Augustus, and the first each for Moore and Whalen.

=== Injuries ===
Seimone Augustus missed two games in June with a strained quadriceps muscle. Jessica Adair underwent arthroscopic surgery on her knee on June 21. Devereaux Peters and Rebekkah Brunson both went out with injuries in July.

=== Second half of season ===
The Lynx returned to action on August 17, 2012, beating the Washington Mystics 98-69. They won their second game back, beating Tulsa 83–59 to clinch a berth in the playoffs. It was the earliest in a season the Lynx had ever clinched a playoff spot.

The Lynx tied a WNBA record on September 7, when they came back from a 25-point deficit to defeat the Atlanta Dream in double overtime.

The Lynx did not lose until September 11, when they fell to the Chicago Sky. By that point, the Lynx were comfortably ahead in the Western Conference standings; the team ultimately won the top overall seed in the playoffs, and matched a franchise record with 27 wins.

== Season standings ==
Western Conference	W	L	PCT	GB	Home	Road	Conf.
Minnesota Lynx ^{z}	27	7	.794	–	16–1	11–6	17–5
Los Angeles Sparks ^{x}	24	10	.706	3.0	16–1	8–9	15–7
San Antonio Silver Stars ^{x}	21	13	.618	6.0	12–5	9–8	14–8
Seattle Storm ^{x}	16	18	.471	11.0	10–7	6–11	11–11
Tulsa Shock ^{o}	9	25	.265	18.0	6–11	3–14	5–17
Phoenix Mercury ^{o}	7	27	.206	20.0	3–14	4–13	4–18

== Schedule ==
=== Preseason ===
2012 Game Log: Preseason (May)

Game	Date	Time (ET)	Opponent	TV	Score	High points	High rebounds	High assists	Location/Attendance	Record
1	Thu 10	7:00	@ Connecticut	CPTV-S	87-85	Augustus (12)	Peters; Wojta (7)	Whalen (5)	Mohegan Sun Arena; 4,835	1-0
2	Tue 15	1:00	Chicago		82-61	Wright (14)	Brunson (7)	Whalen (8)	University of Minnesota; 4,102	2-0

=== Regular season ===
2012 Game Log: Regular Season
May (5–0)

Game	Date	Time (ET)	Opponent	TV	Score	High points	High rebounds	High assists	Location/Attendance	Record
1	Sun 20	12:30	Phoenix	ABC	105-83	Augustus (19)	Brunson (9)	McWilliams-Franklin; Whalen; Wright (5)	Target Center; 12,611	1-0
2	Tue 22	7:00	@ New York		80-62	Augustus (22)	McWilliams-Franklin (11)	Moore (7)	Prudential Center; 5,411	2-0
3	Thu 24	8:00	Los Angeles		92-84	Augustus (25)	McWilliams-Franklin (8)	McWilliams-Franklin (4)	Target Center; 7,923	3-0
4	Sun 27	7:00	Seattle	FS-N	84-71	Moore (19)	Brunson (7)	Whalen (8)	Target Center; 7,832	4-0
5	Wed 30	7:00	@ Washington	CSN-MA	79-77	Brunson; Moore (16)	Brunson (9)	Whalen (7)	Verizon Center; 8,131	5-0

June (8–1)

Game	Date	Time (ET)	Opponent	TV	Score	High points	High rebounds	High assists	Location/Attendance	Record
6	Fri 1	7:00	@ Connecticut	CPTV-S	85-72	Augustus (23)	Brunson (13)	Whalen (8)	Mohegan Sun Arena; 7,249	6-0
7	Sun 3	7:00	San Antonio	FS-N; FS-SW	83-79	Brunson; Moore (17)	Brunson; Whalen (8)	Whalen (7)	Target Center; 7,942	7-0
8	Wed 6	8:00	Seattle		79-55	McWilliams-Franklin (17)	Wiggins (6)	Whalen (5)	Target Center; 8,263	8-0
9	Sat 9	8:00	@ Tulsa		93-73	Moore (26)	Brunson; McWilliams-Franklin (6)	Whalen (10)	BOK Center; 5,113	9-0
10	Fri 15	10:00	@ Phoenix		78-60	Whalen (29)	Harris; Moore (7)	Augustus; Wright (3)	US Airways Center; 7,394	10-0
11	Sun 17	9:00	@ Seattle		62-65	Moore (14)	Brunson (11)	Brunson; McWilliams-Franklin; Whalen (4)	KeyArena; 8,349	10-1
12	Thu 21	8:00	New York		102-70	Augustus (26)	Brunson; Moore (10)	Augustus (8)	Target Center; 9,050	11-1
13	Sat 23	12:30	Chicago	ESPN	79-67	Whalen (25)	Brunson (7)	Whalen (8)	Target Center; 9,267	12-1
14	Wed 27	8:00	Phoenix	FS-N	96-80	Augustus; Brunson (16)	Brunson (13)	Moore; Whalen (6)	Target Center; 9,674	13-1

July (2–3)

Game	Date	Time (ET)	Opponent	TV	Score	High points	High rebounds	High assists	Location/Attendance	Record
15	Sun 1	3:00	@ San Antonio		84-93	Wright (18)	Brunson (10)	Brunson (4)	AT&T Center; 6,568	13-2
16	Thu 5	3:00	@ Los Angeles	NBATV; TWC101	90-96	Augustus (18)	Brunson; McWilliams-Franklin (9)	McWilliams-Franklin (6)	Staples Center; 11,256	13-3
17	Sat 7	8:00	Connecticut	FS-N; CPTV-S	80-86	Moore (19)	Brunson; McWilliams-Franklin (8)	Whalen (5)	Target Center; 10,882	13-4
18	Tue 10	12:30	@ Tulsa		107-86	Wiggins (25)	McWilliams-Franklin (8)	Whalen (7)	BOK Center; 6,012	14-4
19	Thu 12	12:00	Tulsa	FS-N	89-72	Moore (28)	McWilliams-Franklin (12)	Whalen (8)	Target Center; 15,318	15-4
Summer Olympic break

August (6–0)

Game	Date	Time (ET)	Opponent	TV	Score	High points	High rebounds	High assists	Location/Attendance	Record
Summer Olympic break
20	Fri 17	8:00	Washington	NBATV	98-69	Augustus (20)	Brunson (7)	Whalen (9)	Target Center; 10,933	16-4
21	Sun 19	7:00	Tulsa		83-59	Moore (22)	Moore (10)	Moore (6)	Target Center; 10,223	17-4
22	Tue 21	10:00	@ Seattle	ESPN2	86-73	Augustus (22)	Brunson (14)	Whalen (9)	KeyArena; 6,169	18-4
23	Sat 25	7:00	@ Atlanta	ESPN2	84-74	Augustus (23)	Brunson (13)	Whalen (8)	Philips Arena; 7,224	19-4
24	Tue 28	8:00	San Antonio	NBATV	96-84 (OT)	Augustus; McWilliams-Franklin (19)	Brunson (20)	Whalen (8)	Target Center; 8,532	20-4
25	Fri 31	8:00	Tulsa	NBATV	92-83	Brunson; Moore; Whalen (19)	Brunson (11)	Moore (8)	Target Center; 9,213	21-4

September (6-3)

Game	Date	Time (ET)	Opponent	TV	Score	High points	High rebounds	High assists	Location/Attendance	Record
26	Tue 4	8:00	Los Angeles	NBATV	88-77	Augustus; Moore (23)	Moore (9)	McWilliams-Franklin (5)	Target Center; 8,123	22-4
27	Fri 7	8:00	Atlanta	FS-N; SSO	97-93 (2OT)	Moore (23)	Brunson (18)	Whalen (5)	Target Center; 9,308	23-4
28	Sun 9	3:00	@ San Antonio	NBATV	81-62	Moore (18)	Brunson; Moore (12)	Moore (6)	AT&T Center; 6,025	24-4
29	Tue 11	8:00	@ Chicago	CN100	70-83	Moore (18)	Brunson; Wright (5)	Moore (7)	Allstate Arena; 4,296	24-5
30	Fri 14	7:00	@ Indiana		66-64	Moore (15)	Moore (7)	Moore (5)	Bankers Life Fieldhouse; 8,819	25-5
31	Mon 17	8:00	Indiana	NBATV; FS-N; FS-I	86-79	Moore (29)	Whalen (8)	Whalen (6)	Target Center; 9,523	26-5
32	Thu 20	10:30	@ Los Angeles	NBATV; TWC101	76-92	Wright (19)	Peters (13)	Thorn (5)	Staples Center; 10,217	26-6
33	Fri 21	10:00	@ Phoenix	NBATV; FS-N	89-66	Moore (21)	Peters (9)	Peters (6)	US Airways Center; 7,217	27-6
34	Sun 23	3:00	@ San Antonio		84-99	Augustus (18)	Peters (10)	Whalen (5)	AT&T Center; 8,084	27-7

All games are viewable on WNBA LiveAccess or ESPN3.com

=== Postseason ===
2012 Game Log: Postseason
Western Conference Semifinals

Game	Date	Time (ET)	Opponent	TV	Score	High points	High rebounds	High assists	Location/Attendance	Series
1	September 28	9:00	Seattle	ESPN2	78-70	Whalen (20)	Brunson (11)	Whalen (6)	Target Center; 9,213	1-0
2	September 30	9:00	@ Seattle	ESPN	79-86 (2OT)	Brunson (20)	Brunson(15)	Whalen (5)	KeyArena; 8,479	1-1
3	October 2	9:00	Seattle	ESPN2	73-72	Augustus (21)	Brunson (9)	McWilliams-Franklin (4)	Target Center; 8,023	2-1

Western Conference Finals

Game	Date	Time (ET)	Opponent	TV	Score	High points	High rebounds	High assists	Location/Attendance	Series
1	October 4	8:00	Los Angeles	ESPN2	94-77	Moore (20)	Brunson (10)	Augustus (7)	Target Center; 8,513	1-0
2	October 7	3:30	@ Los Angeles	ABC	80-79	Augustus (21)	Brunson (10)	McWilliams-Franklin; Whalen (5)	Staples Center; 10,791	2-0

WNBA Finals

Game	Date	Time (ET)	Opponent	TV	Score	High points	High rebounds	High assists	Location/Attendance	Series
1	October 14	8:00	Indiana	ESPN2	70-76	Augustus (23)	Brunson; Moore (10)	Whalen (4)	Target Center; 14,322	0-1
2	October 17	8:00	Indiana	ESPN	83-71	Augustus (27)	Brunson (7)	McWilliams-Franklin; Moore; Whalen (4)	Target Center; 13,478	1-1
3	October 19	8:00	@ Indiana	ESPN2	59-76	Brunson (12)	Brunson (9)	Wiggins (3)	Bankers Life Fieldhouse; 18,165	1-2
4	October 21	8:00	@ Indiana	ESPN2	78-87	Whalen (22)	Augustus (7)	Whalen (8)	Bankers Life Fieldhouse; 15,213	1-3

== Statistics ==
Legend
GP	Games played	GS	Games started	MPG	Minutes per game	RPG	Rebounds per game
APG	Assists per game	SPG	Steals per game	BPG	Blocks per game	PPG	Points per game
FG%	Field-goal percentage	3P%	3-point field-goal percentage	FT%	Free-throw percentage	TO	Turnovers per game
PF	Fouls per game		Team leader		League leader

=== Regular season ===
Player	GP	GS	MPG	FG%	3P%	FT%	RPG	APG	SPG	BPG	PPG
Jessica Adair	19	0	8.8	.351	.000	.571	2.10	0.3	0.30	0.21	2.4
Seimone Augustus	29	29	28.5	.491	.437	.852	3.60	2.5	0.93	0.21	16.6
Rebekkah Brunson	31	31	27.0	.505	.000	.679	8.90	1.2	1.19	0.94	11.4
Amber Harris	27	0	8.9	.404	.389	.682	1.90	0.6	0.33	0.48	3.5
Taj McWilliams-Franklin	33	33	26.6	.519	.400	.750	5.40	2.5	1.03	1.39	8.4
Maya Moore	34	34	29.7	.465	.388	.879	6.00	3.6	1.47	0.65	16.4
Devereaux Peters	30	2	14.1	.560	.000	.706	3.80	1.1	0.47	0.77	5.3
Erin Thorn	26	0	7.5	.362	.353	1.000	0.90	0.9	0.15	0.00	2.0
Lindsay Whalen	33	33	27.0	.505	.500	.727	4.20	5.4	0.70	0.18	11.5
Candice Wiggins	34	1	21.8	.360	.397	.865	2.10	2.0	0.71	0.12	6.8
Julie Wojta	1	0	4.0	.000	.000	.000	2.00	0.0	0.00	0.00	0.0
Monica Wright	34	7	19.4	.458	.364	.740	2.40	1.9	1.03	0.18	8.6

== Awards and honors ==
- Maya Moore was named WNBA Western Conference Player of the Week for the week of August 16, 2012
- Maya Moore was named WNBA Western Conference Player of the Week for the week of September 3, 2012
- Taj McWilliams-Franklin became the WNBA's all-time leading offensive rebounder
- WNBA record for most consecutive wins to begin a season (10)
- Team record for highest field goal percentage in a single game (.695), July 10 vs. Tulsa
- Lindsay Whalen finished as a Peak Performer, averaging 5.4 assists.
