= Lindsey Moore =

American basketball player (born 1991)

Free agent
- Position: Point guard

Personal information
- Born: June 3, 1991 (age 35) Tacoma, Washington, U.S.
- Listed height: 5 ft 8 in (1.73 m)
- Listed weight: 153 lb (69 kg)

Career information
- High school: Kentwood (Covington, Washington)
- College: Nebraska (2009–2013)
- WNBA draft: 2013: 1st round, 12th overall pick
- Drafted by: Minnesota Lynx
- Playing career: 2013–present

Career history
- 2013–2014: Minnesota Lynx
- 2013–2014: Virtus Elite La Spezia
- 2014–2015: West Coast Waves

Career highlights
- WNBA champion (2013); Big 12 All-Freshman (2010)
- Stats at Basketball Reference

Lindsey Moore (born June 3, 1991) is an American professional basketball player, who formerly played for the Minnesota Lynx of the WNBA, Virtus Elite La Spezia of LegA Basket Femminile and the Australian Women's National Basketball League (WNBL) for the West Coast Waves.

Moore is a point guard, and played college basketball at the University of Nebraska, where she was an AP All-American.

Moore was drafted in the first round by the Lynx, and made the team out of training camp. She is currently a backup guard on the team. She made her professional debut on June 1, 2013, in a victory over the Connecticut Sun. Her playing time in the early season was limited, as she played behind all-WNBA point guard Lindsay Whalen; however, as the season progressed, Moore's playing time increased, and by the playoffs, she was often the second guard off the bench for a team that won the WNBA championship.

Moore was cut from the Lynx on June 24, 2014. She was raised in Covington, Washington.

== WNBA career statistics ==
Legend
GP	Games played	GS	Games started	MPG	Minutes per game	RPG	Rebounds per game
APG	Assists per game	SPG	Steals per game	BPG	Blocks per game	PPG	Points per game
TO	Turnovers per game	FG%	Field-goal percentage	3P%	3-point field-goal percentage	FT%	Free-throw percentage
**Bold**	Career best	°	League leader

†	Denotes seasons in which Moore won a WNBA championship

=== Regular season ===
Year	Team	GP	GS	MPG	FG%	3P%	FT%	RPG	APG	SPG	BPG	TO	PPG
2013^{†}	Minnesota	**23**	0	5.7	**.258**	.250	**.750**	0.6	1.0	0.1	0.0	0.5	1.0
2014	Minnesota	12	0	**8.5**	.200	**.333**	.667	**0.8**	**1.2**	**0.3**	0.0	0.3	**1.1**
Career	2 years, 1 team	35	0	6.6	.239	.286	.700	0.6	1.1	0.2	0.0	0.4	1.0

=== Playoffs ===
Year	Team	GP	GS	MPG	FG%	3P%	FT%	RPG	APG	SPG	BPG	TO	PPG
2013^{†}	Minnesota	6	0	6.2	.167	.000	.000	0.3	1.2	0.3	0.2	0.7	0.3
Career	1 year, 1 team	6	0	6.2	.167	.000	.000	0.3	1.2	0.3	0.2	0.7	0.3

== Nebraska statistics ==
Legend
GP	Games played	GS	Games started	MPG	Minutes per game
FG%	Field goal percentage	3P%	3-point field goal percentage	FT%	Free throw percentage
RPG	Rebounds per game	APG	Assists per game	SPG	Steals per game
BPG	Blocks per game	PPG	Points per game	**Bold**	Career high

Year	Team	GP	Points	FG%	3P%	FT%	RPG	APG	SPG	BPG	PPG
2009–10	Nebraska	**34**	204	36.4%	28.9%	69.7%	2.1	4.5	1.3	0.2	6.0
2010–11	Nebraska	31	437	43.3%	34.3%	77.9%	**3.8**	**5.9**	1.0	0.2	14.1
2011–12	Nebraska	33	**519**	42.6%	31.2%	**81.9%**	3.3	5.1	**2.2**	**0.2**	**15.7**
2012–13	Nebraska	**34**	513	**46.8%**	**38.2%**	80.7%	3.6	5.7	1.8	0.1	15.1
Career		132	1673	43.2%	33.5%	78.7%	3.2	5.3	1.6	0.2	12.7
