= Monica Wright =

American basketball player (born 1988)

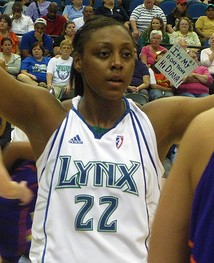
- Wright with the Minnesota Lynx in 2010

Toronto Tempo
- Title: General manager
- League: WNBA

Personal information
- Born: July 15, 1988 (age 38) San Antonio, Texas, U.S.
- Listed height: 5 ft 10 in (1.78 m)
- Listed weight: 182 lb (83 kg)

Career information
- High school: Forest Park (Woodbridge, Virginia)
- College: Virginia (2006–2010)
- WNBA draft: 2010: 1st round, 2nd overall pick
- Drafted by: Minnesota Lynx
- Playing career: 2010–2016
- Position: Guard
- Number: 22
- Coaching career: 2018–2021

Career history

Playing
- 2010–2015: Minnesota Lynx
- 2010–2011: Lotos Gdynia
- 2011–2012: Botaş SK
- 2012–2013: Dandenong Rangers
- 2013: Shinsegae One FX
- 2015–2016: Seattle Storm
- 2015–2016: Bnot Herzliya
- 2016: Keflavík
- 2016: Perth Lynx

Coaching
- 2018–2019: Liberty (assistant)
- 2019–2021: Virginia (assistant)

Career highlights
- 2× WNBA champion (2011, 2013); WNBA All-Rookie Team (2010); WBCA Defensive Player of the Year (2010); All-American – USBWA (2010); State Farm Coaches' All-American (2010); First-team All-American – AP (2010); ACC Player of the Year (2010); ACC Defensive Player of the Year (2010); 2× First-team All-ACC (2009, 2010); 2× ACC All-Defensive Team (2008, 2010); ACC Rookie of the Year (2007); ACC All-Freshman Team (2007); McDonald's All-American (2006)

Career WNBA statistics
- Points: 1,293 (7.3 ppg)
- Rebounds: 388 (2.2 rpg)
- Assists: 292 (1.6 apg)
- Stats at WNBA.com
- Stats at Basketball Reference
Medals
Women's basketball
Representing the United States
FIBA Under-19 World Cup
| Gold medal – first place | 2007 Slovakia | Team |

Monica Ashante Wright Rogers (née Wright; born July 15, 1988) is an American basketball executive and former player and coach. She played college basketball for Virginia and was selected second overall by the Minnesota Lynx in the 2010 WNBA draft. Outside of the WNBA, she played professionally in Poland, Turkey, Australia, South Korea and Iceland. She is currently the general manager for the Toronto Tempo after serving as the assistant general manager for the Phoenix Mercury in the WNBA.

== Early life ==
Wright was born to Garry and Lynette Wright in San Antonio, Texas. She has an older brother named Gerard. Her family later moved to Woodbridge, Virginia, where she attended Forest Park High School. At Forest Park, she averaged 22.6 points, 9.0 rebounds, 6.8 assists and 4.0 steals per game. She was also the Gatorade Virginia Player of the Year and was ranked No. 2 guard and No. 11 player overall in the nation.

Wright was named a WBCA All-American. She participated in the 2006 WBCA High School All-America Game, where she scored eleven points, and earned MVP honors for the White team.

== College career ==
Wright attended the University of Virginia. In her freshman year as a Cavalier, she was named the ACC Rookie of the Year. As a sophomore, she was named to the ACC All-Defensive Team and also notched her 1,000th point. She missed being named to the All-ACC first team by two points that season. As a junior, Wright was named to the All-ACC defensive team and was also rewarded with a spot on the All-ACC first team as the league's top scorer. As a senior, Wright was named ACC Player of the Year, ACC Defensive Player of the Year, and National Defensive Player of the Year. She was also the 2010 WBCA NCAA Division I Defensive Player of the Year.

=== College statistics ===
Legend
| GP | Games played | GS | Games started | MPG | Minutes per game |
| FG% | Field goal percentage | 3P% | 3-point field goal percentage | FT% | Free throw percentage |
| RPG | Rebounds per game | APG | Assists per game | SPG | Steals per game |
| BPG | Blocks per game | PPG | Points per game | **Bold** | Career high |

| Year | Team | GP | Points | FG% | 3P% | FT% | RPG | APG | SPG | BPG | PPG |
| 2006–07 | Virginia | **34** | 512 | 41.2 | 24.0 | 76.3 | 6.0 | 2.2 | 2.3 | 0.4 | 15.1 |
| 2007–08 | Virginia | **34** | 598 | **46.8** | **36.0** | 73.7 | 5.0 | 2.5 | 2.4 | 0.6 | 17.6 |
| 2008–09 | Virginia | **34** | 696 | 42.0 | 28.5 | 74.5 | 5.6 | **3.1** | 2.8 | 0.2 | 20.5° |
| 2009–10 | Virginia | 31 | **734** | 44.6 | 31.3 | **81.1** | **6.5** | 2.5 | **3.7** | **0.6** | **23.7**° |
| Career | | 133 | 2540 | 43.6 | 30.1 | 76.8 | 5.7 | 2.6 | 2.8 | 0.4 | 19.1 |

== Professional career ==
=== WNBA ===
Wright was selected by the Minnesota Lynx with the second overall pick in the 2010 WNBA draft. She went on to be named to the WNBA's all-rookie team. In 2011 and 2012, Wright played off the bench, backing up at both guard and forward. She expanded her role in 2013, becoming the primary backup at shooting guard and point guard, averaging 9.0 points per game. She won WNBA titles with the Lynx in 2011 and 2013.

On July 20, 2015, Wright was traded to the Seattle Storm in exchange for Renee Montgomery and a 2016 second-round draft pick. She missed the rest of the 2015 WNBA season due to a right knee injury. After recovering from the injury, she debuted for the Storm in 2016.

=== Overseas ===
For the 2010–11 season, Wright played in Poland for Lotos Gdynia. For the 2011–12 season, she played in Turkey for Botaş SK. For the 2012–13 season, she played in Australia for the Dandenong Rangers of the WNBL.

In 2013–14, Wright played in Korea for Shinsegae One FX, but left the team in December 2013, reportedly without permission. For the 2014–15 season, she re-joined the Dandenong Rangers, but was released prior to the start of the season after complications with a troublesome knee arose. She started the 2015–16 season with Bnot Herzliya of Israel before signing with Keflavík of the Icelandic Úrvalsdeild kvenna in January 2016. On 22 March 2016, she scored a season high 29 points in a loss against Grindavík. In 6 games for Keflavík, she averaged 16.0 points, 6.0 rebounds and 2.7 assists per game.

On July 14, 2016, Wright signed with the Perth Lynx for the 2016–17 WNBL season. She played in the Lynx's first four games of the season, but due to complications with a long-term knee injury, she was released by the team on October 19, 2016.

== WNBA career statistics ==
Legend
| GP | Games played | GS | Games started | MPG | Minutes per game | RPG | Rebounds per game |
| APG | Assists per game | SPG | Steals per game | BPG | Blocks per game | PPG | Points per game |
| TO | Turnovers per game | FG% | Field-goal percentage | 3P% | 3-point field-goal percentage | FT% | Free-throw percentage |
| **Bold** | Career best | ° | League leader |

| † | Denotes seasons in which Wright won a WNBA championship |

=== Regular season ===
| Year | Team | GP | GS | MPG | FG% | 3P% | FT% | RPG | APG | SPG | BPG | TO | PPG |
|---|---|---|---|---|---|---|---|---|---|---|---|---|---|
| 2010 | Minnesota | **34** | **24** | **25.5** | .370 | .340 | .819 | **2.9** | 1.5 | **1.0** | 0.2 | 2.0 | **11.1** |
| 2011^{†} | Minnesota | 29 | 0 | 13.6 | .379 | .259 | .740 | 1.6 | 1.1 | 0.8 | 0.2 | 1.0 | 5.1 |
| 2012 | Minnesota | **34** | 7 | 19.4 | **.458** | **.364** | .740 | 2.4 | 1.9 | **1.0** | 0.2 | 1.9 | 8.6 |
| 2013^{†} | Minnesota | 33 | 3 | 22.5 | .428 | .256 | .791 | **2.9** | **2.3** | **1.0** | 0.2 | 1.8 | 9.0 |
| 2014 | Minnesota | 24 | 9 | 18.4 | .419 | .278 | .738 | 2.2 | 2.1 | 0.7 | **0.3** | 1.5 | 5.8 |
| 2015 | Minnesota | 7 | 0 | 11.4 | .200 | .167 | **.857** | 0.9 | 1.1 | 0.3 | 0.1 | 1.0 | 2.1 |
| 2016 | Seattle | 16 | 0 | 6.1 | .308 | .100 | .600 | 0.5 | 0.7 | 0.4 | 0.1 | 0.9 | 1.3 |
| Career | 7 years, 2 teams | 177 | 43 | 18.5 | .402 | .303 | .771 | 2.2 | 1.6 | 0.9 | 0.2 | 1.6 | 7.3 |

=== Playoffs ===
| Year | Team | GP | GS | MPG | FG% | 3P% | FT% | RPG | APG | SPG | BPG | TO | PPG |
|---|---|---|---|---|---|---|---|---|---|---|---|---|---|
| 2011^{†} | Minnesota | 8 | 0 | 10.6 | .360 | .250 | .333 | 1.3 | 0.6 | 0.8 | **0.3** | 0.8 | 2.5 |
| 2012 | Minnesota | **9** | 0 | 19.3 | .386 | .286 | .700 | 2.3 | **1.1** | **1.6** | 0.2 | 1.2 | 5.6 |
| 2013^{†} | Minnesota | 7 | 0 | **21.1** | **.472** | .222 | .667 | **2.6** | **1.1** | 0.9 | 0.1 | 1.6 | **9.1** |
| 2014 | Minnesota | 5 | 0 | 15.4 | .391 | **.400** | **1.000** | 1.2 | 1.2 | 0.6 | 0.2 | 1.0 | 4.6 |
| Career | 4 years, 1 team | 29 | 0 | 16.7 | .414 | .280 | .682 | 1.9 | 1.0 | 1.0 | 0.2 | 1.1 | 5.4 |

== National team career ==
Wright was selected as a member of the USA Women's U19 team which won the gold medal at the FIBA U19 World Championship in Bratislava, Slovakia. The event was held in July and August 2007, when the USA team defeated Sweden to win the championship. Wright averaged 9.8 points per game and led the team in steals.

== Coaching career ==
After injuries ended her playing career, Wright turned to coaching. She was an assistant coach at Liberty University during the 2018–2019 season. In May 2019, she was hired as an assistant coach for the Virginia Cavaliers women's basketball team.

== Executive career ==
In January 2023, Wright was hired as an assistant general manager to the Phoenix Mercury.

In February 2025, Wright Rogers was hired as the first general manager for the Toronto Tempo, a 2026 WNBA expansion team.

== Personal life ==
In 2013, Wright became engaged to NBA superstar Kevin Durant, though the two eventually ended their relationship. She is married to Michael Rogers.
