= Devereaux Peters =

American basketball player (born 1989)

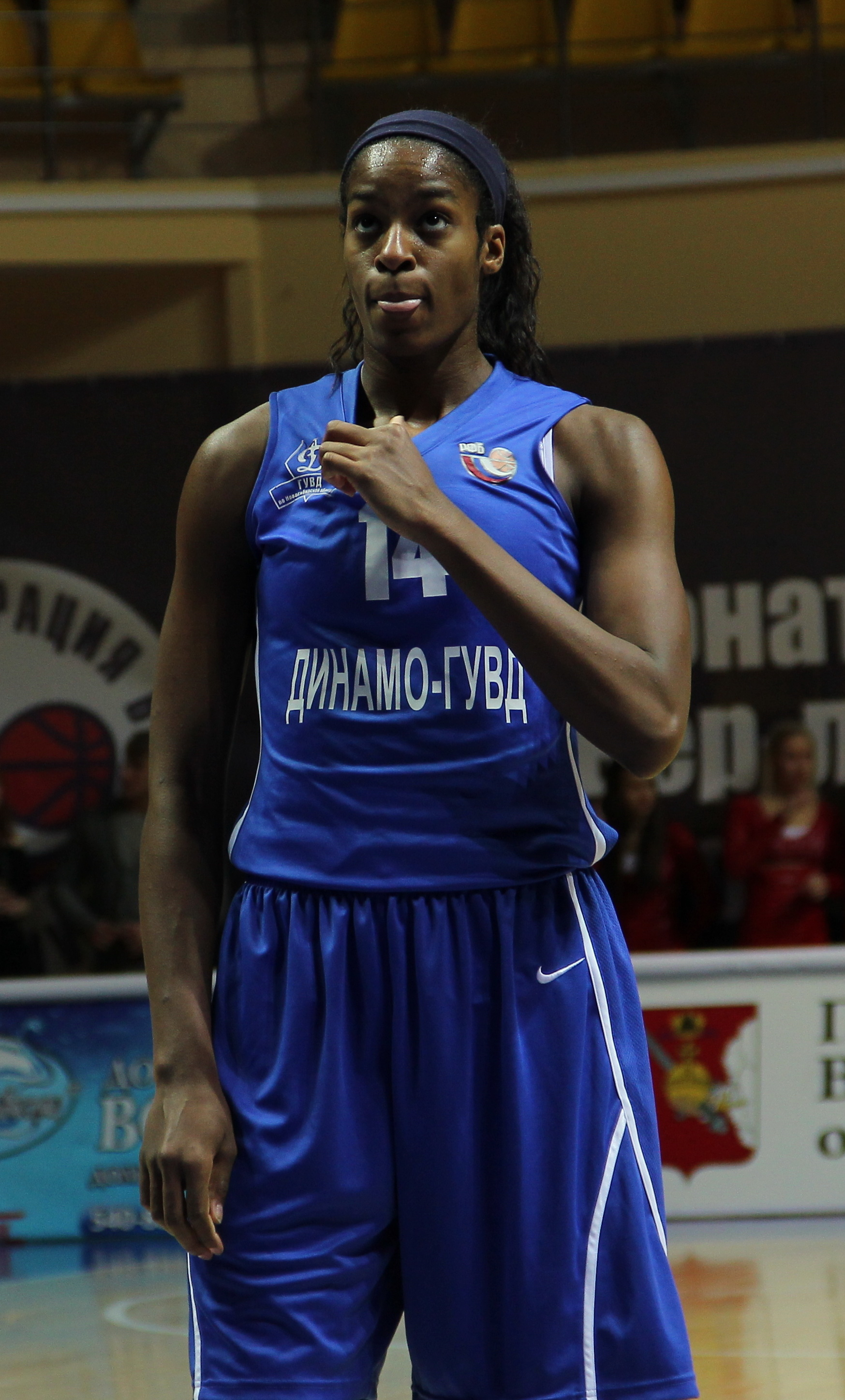
- Peters in 2013

Personal information
- Born: October 8, 1989 (age 37) Chicago, Illinois, U.S.
- Listed height: 6 ft 2 in (1.88 m)
- Listed weight: 170 lb (77 kg)

Career information
- High school: Fenwick (Oak Park, Illinois)
- College: Notre Dame (2007–2012)
- WNBA draft: 2012: 1st round, 3rd overall pick
- Drafted by: Minnesota Lynx
- Playing career: 2012–present
- Position: Forward

Career history
- 2012–2015: Minnesota Lynx
- 2012–2013: Le Mura Lucca
- 2013–2014: WBC Dynamo Novosibirsk
- 2015–present: TS Wisła Can-Pack Kraków
- 2016–2017: Indiana Fever
- 2018: Washington Mystics
- 2018: Phoenix Mercury

Career highlights
- 2× WNBA champion (2013, 2015); 2× Big East Defensive Player of the Year (2011, 2012); 2× First-team All-Big East (2011, 2012); Big East Al-Freshman Team (2008); McDonald's All-American (2007)
- Stats at WNBA.com
- Stats at Basketball Reference
Medals
Representing United States
World University Games
Gold medal – first place	2011 Shenzhen	Team

Devereaux Simoine Peters (born October 8, 1989) is an American basketball forward with WBC Dynamo Novosibirsk of the Russian women's league.

== Career ==
Peters played at Notre Dame, where she was Big East Conference Defensive Player of the Year in 2012. She led a Notre Dame squad that finished second in the 2012 NCAA women's basketball tournament.

Peters made her WNBA debut on May 20, 2012, with the Minnesota Lynx, scoring 3 points and grabbing 4 rebounds in a win over the Phoenix Mercury.

Peters quickly became the first power forward off the bench, and led the team in field goal percentage through sixteen games. In July, Peters broke a finger on her left hand, forcing her to miss three games.

Peters would remain the primary backup in 2013, leading the Lynx in blocked shots. She played a key role in the Lynx's second WNBA championship, serving as a reliable defensive presence.

On February 2, 2016, Peters was traded to the Indiana Fever in exchange for Natasha Howard.

On February 5, 2018, Peters signed a contract with the Washington Mystics.

== USA Basketball ==
Peters played on the team presenting the US at the 2011 World University Games held in Shenzhen, China. The team, coached by Bill Fennelly, won all six games to earn the gold medal. Peters averaged 10.0 points and 5.3 rebounds per game.

== WNBA career statistics ==
Legend
GP	Games played	GS	Games started	MPG	Minutes per game	RPG	Rebounds per game
APG	Assists per game	SPG	Steals per game	BPG	Blocks per game	PPG	Points per game
TO	Turnovers per game	FG%	Field-goal percentage	3P%	3-point field-goal percentage	FT%	Free-throw percentage
**Bold**	Career best	°	League leader

†	Denotes seasons in which Peters won a WNBA championship

=== Regular season ===
Year	Team	GP	GS	MPG	FG%	3P%	FT%	RPG	APG	SPG	BPG	TO	PPG
2012	Minnesota	30	**2**	14.1	**.560**	.000	.706	3.8	1.1	0.5	0.8	1.3	**5.3**
2013^{†}	Minnesota	**34**	**2**	**18.6**	.396	.000	.852	**4.6**	1.1	0.7	**1.0**	0.9	4.1
2014	Minnesota	28	0	18.0	.443	.000	.737	3.7	**1.7**	**0.8**	**1.0**	1.1	4.4
2015^{†}	Minnesota	33	0	14.6	.449	**.375**	**.867**	3.4	0.8	0.2	0.9	0.9	3.2
2016	Indiana	30	0	14.7	.549	.333	.556	3.0	0.7	0.4	0.6	0.6	5.2
2017	Phoenix	5	0	7.6	.333	.000	.000	1.6	0.4	0.0	0.0	0.4	1.6
Career	6 years, 3 teams	160	4	15.7	.474	.308	.738	3.6	1.1	0.5	0.8	0.9	4.3

=== Playoffs ===
Year	Team	GP	GS	MPG	FG%	3P%	FT%	RPG	APG	SPG	BPG	TO	PPG
2012	Minnesota	9	0	6.9	.417	.000	.667	1.8	0.3	0.4	0.6	0.7	1.3
2013^{†}	Minnesota	7	0	**16.6**	**.542**	.000	.500	**3.6**	**1.0**	**1.0**	**1.0**	0.9	3.9
2014	Minnesota	5	0	11.4	.455	.000	.000	2.2	0.2	0.6	0.2	1.2	2.0
2015^{†}	Minnesota	**10**	0	13.9	.531	.000	**1.000**	2.2	0.9	0.5	0.8	0.7	**4.0**
2017	Phoenix	2	0	6.5	.250	.000	.000	1.0	0.0	0.5	0.5	0.5	1.0
Career	5 years, 2 teams	33	0	11.7	.494	.000	.818	2.3	0.6	0.6	0.7	0.8	2.8

== College statistics ==
Legend
GP	Games played	GS	Games started	MPG	Minutes per game
FG%	Field goal percentage	3P%	3-point field goal percentage	FT%	Free throw percentage
RPG	Rebounds per game	APG	Assists per game	SPG	Steals per game
BPG	Blocks per game	PPG	Points per game	**Bold**	Career high

Year	Team	GP	Points	FG%	3P%	FT%	RPG	APG	SPG	BPG	PPG
2007–08	Notre Dame	23	206	52.2	–	**75.0**	5.6	1.0	1.7	2.0	9.0
2008–09	Notre Dame	3	22	68.8	–	–	4.3	1.7	1.7	**2.0**	7.3
2009–10	Notre Dame	25	167	48.2	–	55.0	5.6	1.1	1.4	1.2	6.7
2010–11	Notre Dame	**39**	465	**59.3**	–	72.8	7.5	1.6	1.7	1.7	**11.9**
2011–12	Notre Dame	**39**	**459**	54.4	–	66.9	**9.3**	**2.1**	**2.0**	**2.0**	11.8
Career totals	Notre Dame	129	1319	55.0	0.0	67.3	7.3	1.6	1.7	1.8	10.2
