= Amber Harris =

American basketball player (born 1988)

Free agent
- Position: Forward
- League: WNBA

Personal information
- Born: January 16, 1988 (age 38) Indianapolis, Indiana, U.S.
- Listed height: 6 ft 5 in (1.96 m)
- Listed weight: 193 lb (88 kg)

Career information
- High school: North Central (Indianapolis, Indiana)
- College: Xavier (2006–2011)
- WNBA draft: 2011: 1st round, 4th overall pick
- Drafted by: Minnesota Lynx
- Playing career: 2011–present

Career history
- 2011–2013: Minnesota Lynx
- 2017–2018: Chicago Sky

Career highlights
- 2× WNBA champion (2011, 2013); Second-team All-American - AP (2011); All-American - USBWA (2011); Third-team All-American - AP (2010); 2× State Farm Coaches' All-American (2010, 2011); 2× A-10 Player of the Year (2010, 2011); 4× First-team All-10 (2007, 2008, 2010, 2011); A-10 Freshman of the Year (2007); A-10 All-Freshman Team (2007); A-10 All-Defensive Team (2007); McDonald's All-American (2006); Indiana Miss Basketball (2006)
- Stats at WNBA.com
- Stats at Basketball Reference

Amber Harris (born January 16, 1988) is an American professional basketball player. She last played for the Chicago Sky of the Women's National Basketball Association (WNBA). She played college basketball at Xavier.

== Xavier statistics ==
Legend
GP	Games played	GS	Games started	MPG	Minutes per game
FG%	Field goal percentage	3P%	3-point field goal percentage	FT%	Free throw percentage
RPG	Rebounds per game	APG	Assists per game	SPG	Steals per game
BPG	Blocks per game	PPG	Points per game	**Bold**	Career high

Year	Team	GP	Points	FG%	3P%	FT%	RPG	APG	SPG	BPG	PPG
2006–07	Xavier	**34**	553	46.9	29.5	**68.3**	8.9	0.9	**1.4**	**4.0**	16.3
2007–08	Xavier	33	505	41.0	27.9	63.6	8.9	**2.1**	1.2	2.8	15.3
2008–09	Xavier	redshirt									
2009–10	Xavier	**34**	548	**56.1**	**42.4**	66.7	8.9	1.9	1.3	1.8	16.1
2010–11	Xavier	32	**599**	52.5	28.2	62.7	**10.2**	**2.1**	1.3	2.3	**18.7**
Career totals	Xavier	133	2205	48.9	30.8	65.1	9.2	1.7	1.3	2.7	16.6

== WNBA ==
Harris was selected the first round of the 2011 WNBA draft (4th overall) by the Minnesota Lynx., the second of two Lynx first-round picks. Harris served primarily as a bench player, averaging 3.3 points per game on a team that had the best record in the Western Conference. Harris continued to be a role player in the playoffs, but still had some notable moments, including a key three-pointer in the Finals against the Atlanta Dream, which ultimately helped the Lynx win the WNBA championship.

== WNBA career statistics ==
Legend
GP	Games played	GS	Games started	MPG	Minutes per game	RPG	Rebounds per game
APG	Assists per game	SPG	Steals per game	BPG	Blocks per game	PPG	Points per game
TO	Turnovers per game	FG%	Field-goal percentage	3P%	3-point field-goal percentage	FT%	Free-throw percentage
**Bold**	Career best	°	League leader

†	Denotes seasons in which Harris won a WNBA championship

=== Regular season ===
Year	Team	GP	GS	MPG	FG%	3P%	FT%	RPG	APG	SPG	BPG	TO	PPG
2011^{†}	Minnesota	27	0	**10.3**	.398	.000	**.742**	**2.2**	0.4	0.1	0.4	0.5	3.3
2012	Minnesota	27	0	8.9	**.404**	**.389**	.682	1.9	0.6	**0.3**	**0.5**	0.6	**3.5**
2013^{†}	Minnesota	**30**	**1**	8.8	.375	.143	.714	1.5	**0.7**	0.1	0.2	0.5	2.4
2017	Chicago	27	0	5.9	.396	.000	.625	1.6	0.2	0.1	0.3	0.3	1.6
2018	Chicago	1	0	2.0	.000	.000	.000	0.0	0.0	0.0	0.0	0.0	0.0
Career	5 years, 2 teams	112	1	8.4	.394	.209	.707	1.8	0.5	0.2	0.3	0.4	2.7

=== Playoffs ===
Year	Team	GP	GS	MPG	FG%	3P%	FT%	RPG	APG	SPG	BPG	TO	PPG
2011^{†}	Minnesota	**6**	0	**5.2**	.400	**1.000**	.000	**1.2**	**0.2**	**0.2**	0.0	0.0	1.5
2012	Minnesota	**6**	0	4.2	**.444**	.250	**.500**	0.7	0.0	0.0	0.0	0.3	**1.7**
2013^{†}	Minnesota	5	0	3.0	.333	.000	.000	0.8	0.0	0.0	0.2	0.4	0.8
Career	3 years, 1 team	17	0	4.2	.400	.400	.500	0.9	0.1	0.1	0.1	0.2	1.4
