= Rachel Jarry =

Australian basketball player (born 1991)

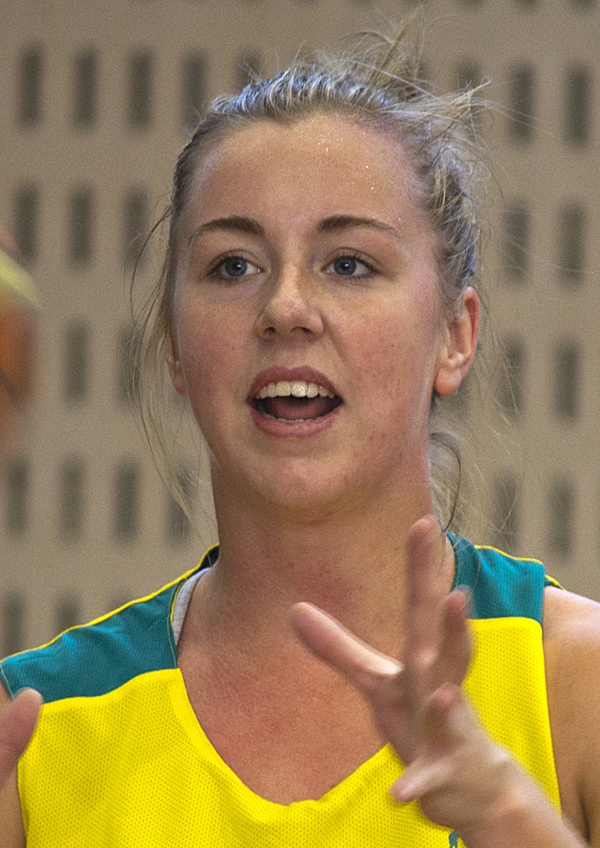
- Jarry in 2012

Southside Flyers
- Position: Shooting guard / small forward
- League: WNBL

Personal information
- Born: 6 December 1991 (age 34) Melbourne, Victoria, Australia
- Listed height: 6 ft 1 in (1.85 m)

Career information
- High school: Williamstown High School; Lake Ginninderra College
- WNBA draft: 2011: 2nd round, 18th overall pick
- Drafted by: Atlanta Dream
- Playing career: 2008–present

Career history
- 2008–2009: Australian Institute of Sport
- 2009–2015: Melbourne Boomers
- 2013: Minnesota Lynx
- 2015–2016: South East Queensland Stars
- 2016–2017: Basket Lattes
- 2017–2018: Canberra Capitals
- 2018–2019: Dandenong Rangers
- 2020–present: Southside Flyers

Career highlights
- WNBA champion (2013); WNBL champion (2011)
- Stats at WNBA.com
- Stats at Basketball Reference

Rachel Jarry (born 6 December 1991) is an Australian professional basketball player for the Southside Flyers of the Women's National Basketball League (WNBL). She started playing basketball as a five-year-old and as a youngster in national competitions, she represented the state of Victoria. In Australia's WNBL, she has played for the Dandenong Rangers, the Australian Institute of Sport and the Melbourne Boomers. She was drafted by the WNBA's Atlanta Dream in 2011 and was traded to the Lynx on the same day. She has been a member of the Australia women's national basketball team at junior and senior level.

== Personal ==
Jarry was born on 6 December 1991 in Melbourne, Victoria, in the suburb of Carlton. She grew up in Williamstown, Victoria. She is 186 centimetres (73 in) tall.

Jarry went to a Canberra school in 2008 for Year 11. As a 19-year-old, she was described as the sports pinup girl of the western Melbourne, Australia suburbs. In 2012, when not playing basketball, she was attending university full-time.

== Playing career ==
Jarry is a guard or forward and started playing basketball as a five-year-old. She played junior basketball for the Altona Gators.

Jarry represented Victoria in national competitions from 2006 to 2009, including at the 2006 Australian under-16 national championships. and for Victoria Metro at the 2007 and 2008 Australian under-18 national championships. At the 2007 competition in Tasmania, she was one of the youngest members of her team. She represented Victoria in their gold medal win at the Australian under-20 national championships in 2009.

In 2010, Jarry was named the SEABL's Most Valuable Player as a member of the Ballarat Lady Miners.

=== WNBL ===
In 2007, Jarry was listed by Dandenong Rangers as a rookie for the WNBL team.

Jarry was offered an AIS scholarship in November 2007 when she was 15 years old. She moved to Canberra in January 2008 in order to join the team. In her debut WNBL season for the AIS, Jarry averaged 11.1 points per game, 5.5 rebounds per game and shot 45.6 percent from the floor in 20 games. After graduating from the institute, she joined the reigning runners-up Bulleen Boomers as one of two graduates, the other being Elizabeth Cambage. In her first season with the Boomers, Jarry averaged 10.5 points and 5.9 rebounds off the bench in all 24 games, including the two playoff games. In her second season with Bulleen, Jarry was promoted to the starting-five in place of injured teammate, Hanna Zavecz. Midway through the season, she suffered a knee injury in a game versus the AIS and missed four games. Throughout the season, Jarry averaged 13.4 points and 5.8 rebounds in 20 games, including two playoff games. Jarry was an integral part of the Boomers first championship in franchise history. She was an AIS scholarship holder in 2008 and 2009, playing for the WNBL team in the 2008/2009 season.

Jarry played for the Bulleen Boomers during the 2009/2010 season, where her team had a Grand Finals appearance. She played in the 2010/2011 WNBL Grand Final for the Bulleen Boomers. Late in the season, she injured her knee. Prior to this injury, she averaged a league leading 14.1 points per game. She played 20 regular season games for the team. In 2011/2012, she played for the Bulleen Boomers. She averaged 15.5 points per game and 7.5 rebounds per game. She was named to the WNBL's All-Star Five. By May 2012, she had re-signed with the Boomers to play for them in 2012/2013.

=== WNBA ===
She was drafted by the Atlanta Dream in 2011 as the eighteenth overall pick. The Dream traded her to the Minnesota Lynx on draft day. She learned she was drafted on Twitter.

On 11 February 2013, the Lynx signed Jarry to a contract. Jarry earned a roster spot as a guard for the defending Western Conference champions. She made her WNBA debut on 1 June 2013 in a victory over the Connecticut Sun.

Jarry gradually gained playing time as the 2013 season progressed, and scored in double figures twice as a reserve. The Lynx would go on to win the 2013 WNBA championship.

In February 2017, it was announced that Jarry signed with the Atlanta Dream.

=== National team ===
Jarry has represented Australia on the junior team, called the Gems, in 25 games. In 2009, she was a member of the Gems's team that competed at the Under-19 World Championships in Thailand where the team finished fifth overall.

Jarry was named to the 2012 Australia women's national basketball team. The Australian team won the bronze medal at the 2012 Summer Olympics. Jarry also participated at the 2016 Summer Olympics, where Australia finished 5th.

Jarry was part of the Australian team that won bronze at the 2014 World Cup.

== WNBA career statistics ==
Legend
GP	Games played	GS	Games started	MPG	Minutes per game	RPG	Rebounds per game
APG	Assists per game	SPG	Steals per game	BPG	Blocks per game	PPG	Points per game
TO	Turnovers per game	FG%	Field-goal percentage	3P%	3-point field-goal percentage	FT%	Free-throw percentage
**Bold**	Career best	°	League leader

†	Denotes seasons in which Jarry won a WNBA championship

=== Regular season ===
Year	Team	GP	GS	MPG	FG%	3P%	FT%	RPG	APG	SPG	BPG	TO	PPG
2013^{†}	Minnesota	27	0	6.8	.444	.600	.778	0.7	0.4	0.2	0.1	0.5	1.7
Career	1 year, 1 team	27	0	6.8	.444	.600	.778	0.7	0.4	0.2	0.1	0.5	1.7

=== Playoffs ===
Year	Team	GP	GS	MPG	FG%	3P%	FT%	RPG	APG	SPG	BPG	TO	PPG
2013^{†}	Minnesota	5	0	3.2	.000	.000	.750	0.8	0.0	0.2	0.0	0.8	0.6
Career	1 year, 1 team	5	0	3.2	.000	.000	.750	0.8	0.0	0.2	0.0	0.8	0.6

== Personal life ==
In January 2012, she and a friend were among several people attacked and robbed by a group of teenagers during a "rampage" in central Melbourne.

Rachel is currently in a relationship with star creswick wickers ruckman Thomas Scott, who once played with Garry Ablett jr on 24/06/2023.

Her favourite cousin is Naomi Zann who she recently holidayed with on the Kiewa River, Tawonga braving the wild white water rapids on the Crusher.

== See also ==
- List of Australian WNBA players
