= Felicia Chester =

American basketball player (born 1988)

Personal information
- Born: March 24, 1988 (age 38) St. Louis, Missouri, U.S.
- Listed height: 6 ft 3 in (1.91 m)
- Listed weight: 180 lb (82 kg)

Career information
- High school: Incarnate Word (Bel-Nor, Missouri)
- College: DePaul (2006–2011)
- WNBA draft: 2011: 2nd round, 14th overall pick
- Drafted by: Minnesota Lynx
- Position: Forward

Career history
- 2011: New York Liberty
- Stats at WNBA.com
- Stats at Basketball Reference

Felicia Chester (born March 24, 1988) is an American basketball player who most recently played for the Chicago Sky of the Women's National Basketball Association.

== Professional career ==
Chester was selected in the second round of the 2011 WNBA draft (14th overall) by the Minnesota Lynx. She was then traded to Atlanta. She was waived before the season, but New York signed her on July 4, 2011.

== Career statistics ==
=== WNBA ===
Legend
GP	Games played	GS	Games started	MPG	Minutes per game	RPG	Rebounds per game
APG	Assists per game	SPG	Steals per game	BPG	Blocks per game	PPG	Points per game
TO	Turnovers per game	FG%	Field-goal percentage	3P%	3-point field-goal percentage	FT%	Free-throw percentage
**Bold**	Career best	°	League leader

==== Regular season ====
WNBA regular season
Year	Team	GP	GS	MPG	FG%	3P%	FT%	RPG	APG	SPG	BPG	TO	PPG
2011	New York	4	0	6.8	33.3	—	0.0	2.0	0.0	0.3	0.0	0.0	0.5
**Career**	1 year, 1 team	4	0	6.8	33.3	—	0.0	2.0	0.0	0.3	0.0	0.0	0.5

=== College ===
NCAA statistics
Year	Team	GP	Points	FG%	3P%	FT%	RPG	APG	SPG	BPG	PPG
2006–07	DePaul	5	16	53.8	–	**100.0**	3.2	0.4	0.4	**1.4**	3.2
2007–08	DePaul	31	152	56.0	–	71.4	3.1	0.4	1.1	0.8	4.9
2008–09	DePaul	30	219	52.2	00.0	74.6	5.8	1.2	1.6	1.2	7.3
2009–10	DePaul	33	331	55.0	20.0	72.7	**6.9**	1.6	1.1	1.3	10.0
2010–11	DePaul	**36**	**411**	**57.0**	**40.0**	55.1	6.6	**1.7**	**1.7**	0.5	**11.4**
**Career**		135	1129	55.3	33.3	66.5	5.6	1.2	1.3	1.0	8.4
