= Sugar Rodgers =

American basketball player (born 1989)

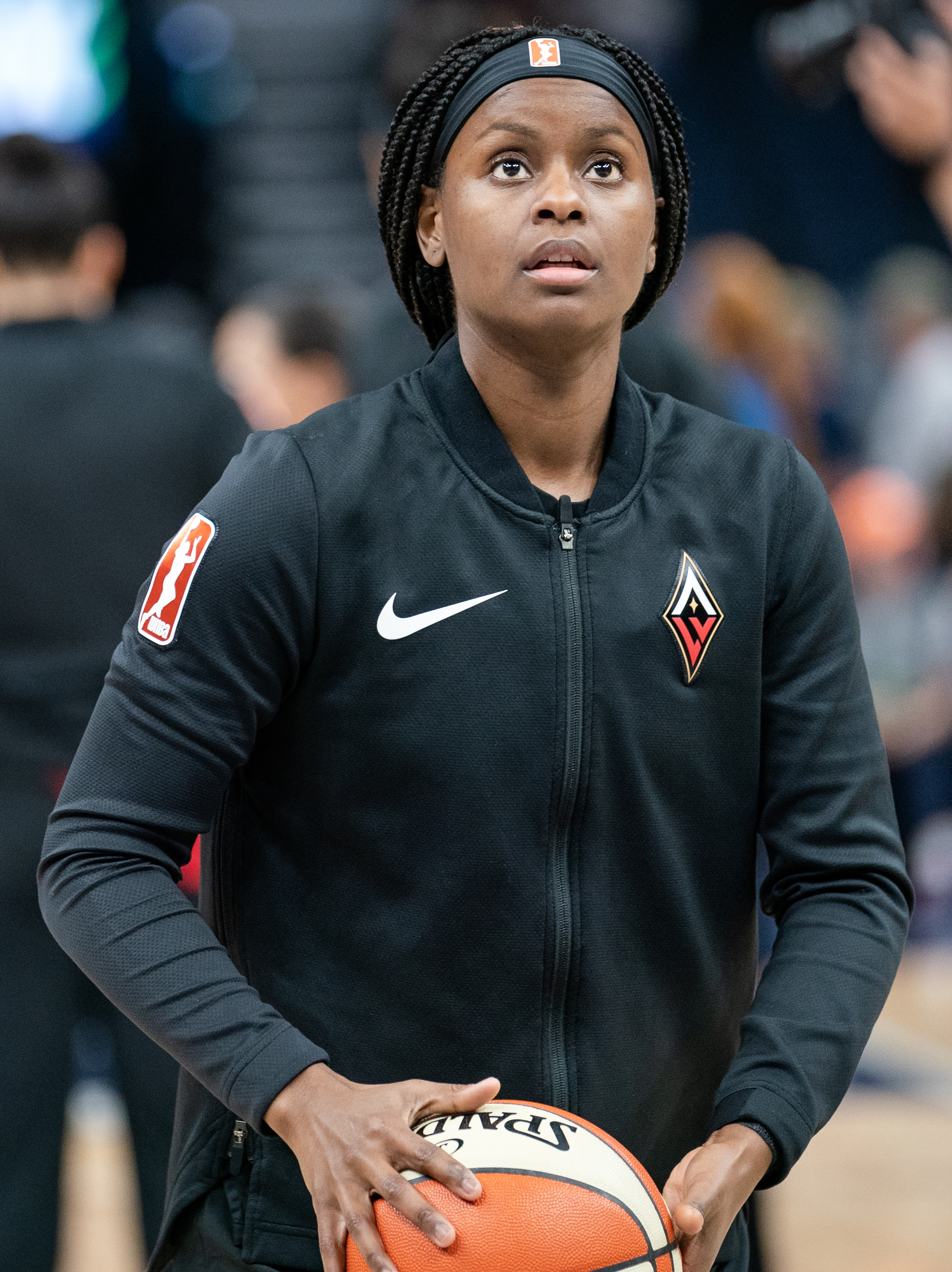
- Rodgers in 2019

Golden State Valkyries
- Title: Assistant coach
- League: WNBA

Personal information
- Born: December 8, 1989 (age 36) Suffolk, Virginia, U.S.
- Listed height: 5 ft 9 in (1.75 m)
- Listed weight: 161 lb (73 kg)

Career information
- High school: King's Fork (Suffolk, Virginia)
- College: Georgetown (2009–2013)
- WNBA draft: 2013: 2nd round, 14th overall pick
- Drafted by: Minnesota Lynx
- Playing career: 2013–2020
- Position: Guard
- Number: 15, 14
- Coaching career: 2021–present

Career history

Playing
- 2013: Minnesota Lynx
- 2014–2018: New York Liberty
- 2019–2020: Las Vegas Aces

Coaching
- 2021: Las Vegas Aces (Asst.)
- 2021–2022: Georgetown (Asst.)
- 2022–2025: William & Mary (Asst.)
- 2025–present: Golden State Valkyries (Asst.)

Career highlights
- As player: WNBA champion (2013); WNBA All-Star (2017); WNBA Sixth Woman of the Year Award (2017); 4× First-team All-Big East (2010–2013); Big East Freshman of the Year (2010); Big East All-Freshman Team (2010); As assistant coach: WNBA champion (2026); CAA tournament (2025)
- Stats at WNBA.com
- Stats at Basketball Reference

Ta'Shauna "Sugar" Rodgers (born December 8, 1989) is an American professional basketball coach and former player who is an assistant coach for the Golden State Valkyries of the Women's National Basketball Association (WNBA).

Rodgers played collegiately for the Georgetown Hoyas. A prolific three-point shooter, Rodgers was drafted by the Minnesota Lynx in part to fill the void created by the trade of Candice Wiggins.

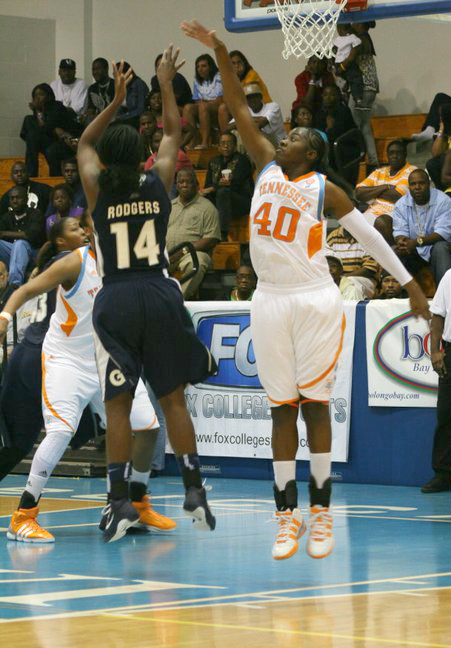
Rodgers (left) with Georgetown

At Georgetown, she was the school's all-time scoring leader, with 2,518 points, and the team's all-time steals leader, with 326, as well as holding the team record for 3-point field goals made. She was a four-time All Big East First Team pick, and was drafted by the Lynx in the second round as the 14th overall pick.

== Early life ==
Rodgers was born in Suffolk, Virginia to Barbara Mae Rodgers and Oscar Allen Saunders Jr. in 1989. Rodgers played basketball for her high school team at King's Fork High School, where she became the school's MVP all four years, conference Player of the Year three times, as well as a McDonald's All-American. She was named a Parade All-American in 2009. She graduated with her school's records in career points, assists, rebounds and blocks. At the 2007 AAU Nike Nationals, Sugar didn't start, but played in every game as for the Suffolk Blazers, and was named the tournament's MVP. Sugar's mother, who had played basketball herself at Booker T. Washington High School, died in 2005 from lupus, and her father died in July 2012.

== College career ==
Rodgers was recruited to the Georgetown Hoyas in part through her play on the AAU Suffolk Blazers, who were coached by Boo Williams, the brother of Georgetown head coach Terri Williams-Flournoy. Rodgers excelled early at Georgetown, and was named 2010 Big East Freshman of the Year, as well as First Team All-Big East, a feat she repeated all four years. That year she led the team to new heights, propelling them into the national rankings for the first time in fifteen years, and helping the team to just its second NCAA Tournament invitation. In her sophomore year, she led the team to the NCAA's Sweet Sixteen with an upset win over rival Maryland, before losing to UConn.

In her four years, she amassed 2,518 points to become the leading scorer all-time at Georgetown on either the men's or women's team. The leading scorer on the men's team, Sleepy Floyd had 2,304 points, while Patrick Ewing had 2,184. She was a three-time AP Honorable Mention All-American, and majored in English.

== Professional ==
Rodgers was selected 2nd in the 2nd round of the 2013 WNBA draft as the 14th overall pick by the Minnesota Lynx. She made the team out of training camp, and made her professional debut on June 1, 2013, in a victory over the Connecticut Sun. Rodgers has logged the most minutes of the three rookies on the team, earning playing time thanks to aggressive defense and hustle.

During the WNBA off season, Rodgers joined the Arras team in France. She was traded to the New York Liberty prior to the 2014 season. In the WNBA, she averages 18.8 minutes per game, 35.7% three-point field goals, and 7.8 PPG.

On April 11, 2019, Rodgers was traded to the Las Vegas Aces as part of a four-way deal that saw Rodgers head to Las Vegas in exchange for a second-round pick in the 2020 WNBA draft, which in turn was traded to the Atlanta Dream for guard Nia Coffey. Also involved in that trade was the acquisition of Tanisha Wright from the Minnesota Lynx in exchange for a second round pick in the 2020 WNBA Draft.

== Coaching ==
=== Las Vegas Aces ===
After her retirement following the 2020 WNBA season, Rodgers was hired by the Las Vegas Aces as an assistant coach.

=== Georgetown ===
Rodgers returned to her alma mater as an assistant coach in 2021.

=== William & Mary ===
In June 2022, Rodgers was hired as an assistant on Erin Dickerson Davis' staff at William & Mary.

During her time in Williamsburg, Rodgers primarily worked with the program's guards. She helped coach William & Mary to their first-ever CAA Tournament title and NCAA Tournament berth in 2025.

=== Golden State Valkyries ===
On March 27, 2025, it was announced that Rodgers was hired as an assistant coach for the expansion Golden State Valkyries' inaugural season.

== Statistics ==
=== Georgetown ===
Legend
GP	Games played	GS	Games started	MPG	Minutes per game
FG%	Field goal percentage	3P%	3-point field goal percentage	FT%	Free throw percentage
RPG	Rebounds per game	APG	Assists per game	SPG	Steals per game
BPG	Blocks per game	PPG	Points per game	**Bold**	Career high

Year	Team	GP	Points	FG%	3P%	FT%	RPG	APG	SPG	BPG	PPG
2009–10	Georgetown	33	580	39.6	33.3	78.0	3.6	1.9	1.8	0.2	17.6
2010–11	Georgetown	**35**	653	**40.5**	**34.8**	**82.9**	4.9	2.4	2.5	0.3	18.7
2011–12	Georgetown	31	574	34.3	29.3	81.9	5.4	1.7	2.3	0.4	18.5
2012–13	Georgetown	31	**711**	36.4	31.9	75.8	**6.9**	**4.1**	**3.4**	**0.5**	**22.9**
Career	Georgetown	130	2518	37.6	32.3	79.3	5.2	2.5	2.5	0.3	19.4

=== WNBA ===
Legend
GP	Games played	GS	Games started	MPG	Minutes per game	RPG	Rebounds per game
APG	Assists per game	SPG	Steals per game	BPG	Blocks per game	PPG	Points per game
TO	Turnovers per game	FG%	Field-goal percentage	3P%	3-point field-goal percentage	FT%	Free-throw percentage
**Bold**	Career best	°	League leader

†	Denotes seasons in which Rogers won a WNBA championship

=== Regular season ===
Year	Team	GP	GS	MPG	FG%	3P%	FT%	RPG	APG	SPG	BPG	TO	PPG
2013^{†}	Minnesota	28	0	7.6	.317	.313	.571	1.4	0.5	0.5	0.3	0.4	1.9
2014	New York	**34**	0	16.6	.353	.289	.735	2.1	1.3	0.7	0.3	1.0	6.0
2015	New York	33	5	18.7	.340	.320	**.881**	2.2	1.5	0.7	0.2	1.0	8.1
2016	New York	33	**33**	**30.5**	**.405**	**.413**	.842	3.7	**2.4**	**1.1**	**0.5**	1.8	**14.5**
2017	New York	33	15	25.6	.339	.342	.815	**3.8**	2.3	0.9	**0.5**	1.6	10.5
2018	New York	31	13	19.6	.362	.323	.826	3.2	2.0	0.7	0.1	1.2	6.3
2019	Las Vegas	33	0	11.6	.360	.357	.600	1.5	1.2	0.4	0.4	0.8	3.4
2020	Las Vegas	22	1	12.0	.321	.313	.750	1.3	1.4	0.3	0.1	0.7	3.4
Career	8 years, 3 teams	247	67	18.2	.359	.346	.816	2.5	1.6	0.7	0.3	1.1	7.0

=== Playoffs ===
Year	Team	GP	GS	MPG	FG%	3P%	FT%	RPG	APG	SPG	BPG	TO	PPG
2013^{†}	Minnesota	5	0	2.2	.250	.000	.500	0.2	0.0	0.0	0.0	0.0	0.6
2015	New York	6	0	17.0	.372	**.438**	**.875**	1.7	2.5	**1.0**	**0.3**	1.5	8.8
2016	New York	1	**1**	**24.0**	**.444**	.250	.667	2.0	**3.0**	0.0	0.0	0.0	**11.0**
2017	New York	1	0	18.0	.375	.333	.000	**3.0**	**3.0**	**1.0**	0.0	2.0	8.0
2019	Las Vegas	5	0	5.4	.143	.167	.000	1.0	0.2	0.2	0.0	0.6	0.6
2020	Las Vegas	**8**	0	9.9	.143	.167	.000	1.1	1.0	0.3	0.0	0.6	1.1
Career	6 years, 3 teams	26	1	10.0	.304	.275	.810	1.2	1.2	0.4	0.1	0.7	3.3

== Personal life ==
Rodgers is an ambassador for Up2Us Sports, a national non-profit organization dedicated to supporting underserved youth by providing them with coaches trained in positive youth development.
