= Jessica Adair =

American basketball player (born 1986)

Personal information
- Born: December 19, 1986 (age 39) Washington, D.C., U.S.
- Listed height: 6 ft 4 in (1.93 m)
- Listed weight: 197 lb (89 kg)

Career information
- High school: Anacostia (Washington, D.C.)
- College: George Washington (2005–2009)
- WNBA draft: 2009: 3rd round, 34th overall pick
- Drafted by: Phoenix Mercury
- Playing career: 2010–present
- Position: Center

Career history
- 2010–2012: Minnesota Lynx
- 2010–2011: Samsun
- 2011–2012: Tarsus Belediyesi
- 2012–2013: Townsville Fire

Career highlights
- WNBA champion (2011); 3× First-team All-Atlantic 10 (2007–2009)
- Stats at WNBA.com
- Stats at Basketball Reference

Jessica Elizabeth Adair (born December 19, 1986) is an American former professional basketball player who played for the Minnesota Lynx of the Women's National Basketball Association (WNBA).

== Personal ==
Born December 19, 1986 in Washington, D.C. Her full name is Jessica Elizabeth Adair (pronounced 'AY-dare'). She is the daughter of Angela Monica Adair. Her twin sister, Jazmine, also played at George Washington. She majored in criminal justice.

== College career ==
Averaged 12.7 points, 6.6 rebounds and 1.4 blocks per game over her four-year career at George Washington. A three-time All-Atlantic First Team selection. Completed her career ranked 11th on GW's career scoring list (1,475 points), 7th in career rebounds (770 rebounds) and 5th in career blocks (161 blocks). Led the Colonials in scoring (13.7 ppg), rebounding (7.4 rpg), blocks (1.7 bpg), steals (1.1 spg) and field goal percentage (.584) her senior year. Finalist for USA Basketball's 2007 Pan Am Games squad. Helped GW advance to the NCAA Tournament in both 2006 and 2007, and registered a 15-point, 21-rebound outing in the first-round victory over Boise State during her sophomore season (March 17, 2007).

=== College statistics ===
Legend
GP	Games played	GS	Games started	MPG	Minutes per game
FG%	Field goal percentage	3P%	3-point field goal percentage	FT%	Free throw percentage
RPG	Rebounds per game	APG	Assists per game	SPG	Steals per game
BPG	Blocks per game	PPG	Points per game	**Bold**	Career high

Year	Team	GP	Points	FG%	3P%	FT%	RPG	APG	SPG	BPG	PPG
2005-06	George Washington	22	160	54.5	-	58.8	5.0	0.3	0.6	0.8	7.3
2006-07	George Washington	30	387	52.8	-	64.4	**7.6**	0.5	1.1	**1.7**	12.9
2007-08	George Washington	**33**	**502**	52.0	-	**71.4**	6.1	0.7	**1.2**	1.2	**15.2**
2008-09	George Washington	31	426	**58.4**	-	65.2	7.4	**1.0**	1.1	1.6	13.7
Career	George Washington	116	1475	54.2	-	66.4	6.6	0.6	1.0	1.4	12.7

== WNBA career ==
2009: Drafted by Phoenix in the 3rd round (34th overall) in the 2009 draft. She was later waived on May 13.
2010: She was signed by Minnesota on April 22 and appeared in one preseason game with the Lynx, totaling 14 points, six rebounds, three steals and three blocks (in 26:06) April 30 vs. Chicago in St. Paul, but missed the May 6 rematch in Chicago due to a strained left hip. She was then waived on May 14. She then signed as a free agent later that season on August 18, and drew a DNP-CD at Los Angeles on August 20. Made her WNBA debut by appearing in the August 22 season finale at Indiana, collecting five points and a team-high eight rebounds (logging 13:35) in Minnesota's OT victory.
2011: She was re-signed by the Lynx on February 1. During the 2011 season, Adair started one game and served as the primary backup to center Taj McWilliams-Franklin. She appeared in 31 games drawing three DNP-CD early in the season.

Adair was injured throughout much of the 2012 season, and was released by the Lynx prior to the 2013 season.

== Overseas ==
2010–11: Played for Samsun in the Turkish League where she played in 25 games, averaging 14.4 points and 10.3 rebounds per game.

== WNBA career statistics ==
Legend
GP	Games played	GS	Games started	MPG	Minutes per game	RPG	Rebounds per game
APG	Assists per game	SPG	Steals per game	BPG	Blocks per game	PPG	Points per game
TO	Turnovers per game	FG%	Field-goal percentage	3P%	3-point field-goal percentage	FT%	Free-throw percentage
**Bold**	Career best	°	League leader

†	Denotes seasons in which Adair won a WNBA championship

=== Regular season ===
Year	Team	GP	GS	MPG	FG%	3P%	FT%	RPG	APG	SPG	BPG	TO	PPG
2010	Minnesota	1	0	**14.0**	**1.000**	.000	**.750**	**8.0**	0.0	0.0	0.0	0.0	**5.0**
2011^{†}	Minnesota	**31**	**1**	10.4	.485	.000	.653	2.9	**0.3**	**0.3**	**0.6**	0.9	4.3
2012	Minnesota	19	0	8.8	.351	.000	.571	2.1	0.3	0.2	0.2	0.7	2.4
Career	3 years, 1 team	51	1	9.9	.454	.000	.625	2.7	**0.3**	0.2	0.4	0.8	3.6

=== Playoffs ===
Year	Team	GP	GS	MPG	FG%	3P%	FT%	RPG	APG	SPG	BPG	TO	PPG
2011^{†}	Minnesota	**8**	0	**12.3**	.469	.000	**0.667**	**3.6**	**0.3**	**0.6**	**0.6**	**5.8**	
2012	Minnesota	4	0	0.8	**1.000**	.000	.000	0.5	0.0	0.0	0.0	0.0	0.5
Career	2 years, 1 team	12	0	8.4	.485	.000	.667	2.6	0.2	0.4	0.4	1.0	4.0
