= Shelley Patterson =

American basketball coach

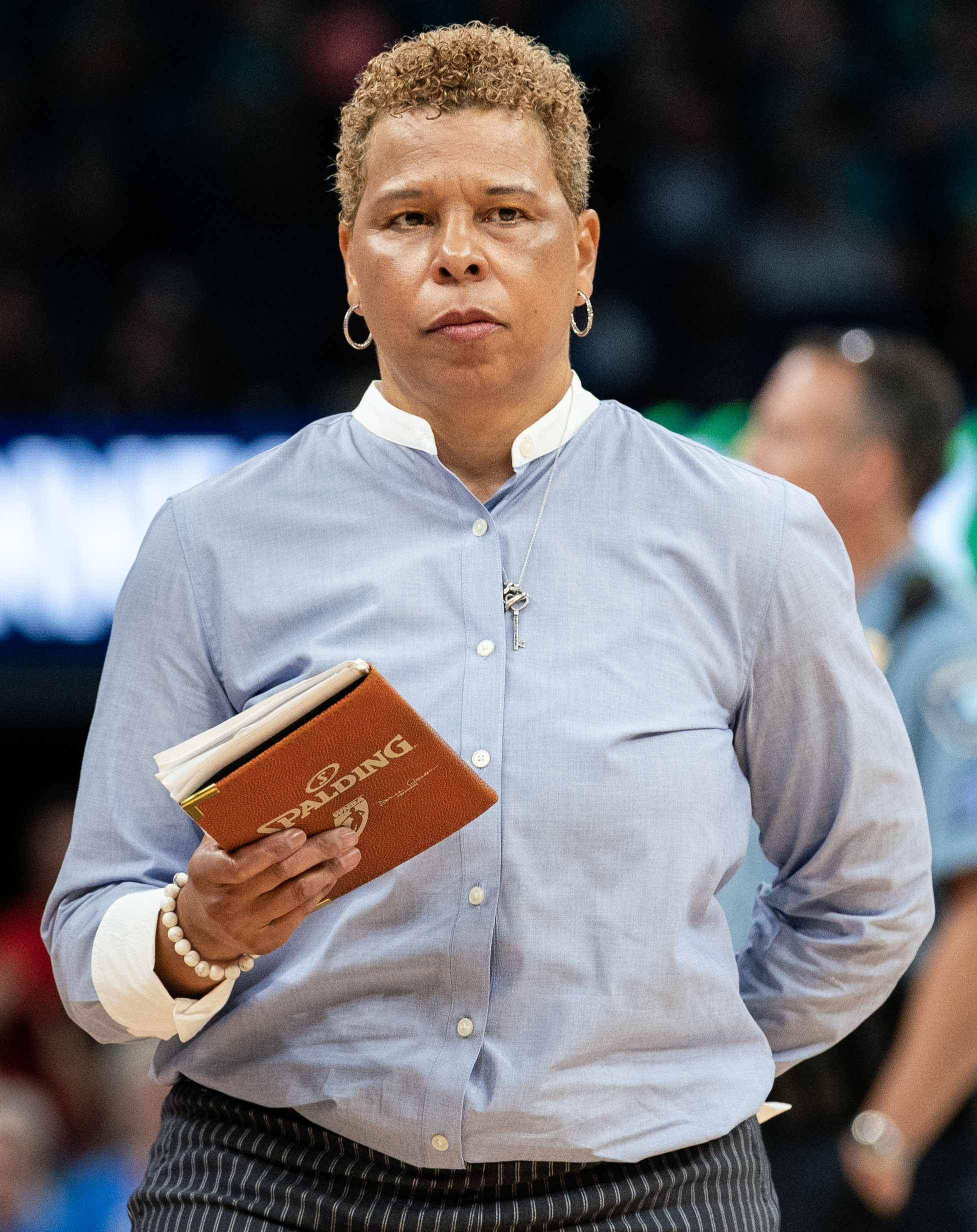
- Patterson in 2019

Washington Mystics
- Position: Head of Domestic Scouting
- League: WNBA

Career information
- College: Washington State (1980–1984)
- Coaching career: 1989–present

Career history

Coaching
- 1999: Houston Comets (assistant)
- 2000–2003: Indiana Fever (assistant)
- 2004: Phoenix Mercury (assistant)
- 2005: Los Angeles Sparks (assistant)
- 2006–2009: Seattle Storm (assistant)
- 2010–2019: Minnesota Lynx (assistant)
- 2020–2021: New York Liberty (assistant)
- 2022–2024: Washington Mystics (assistant)

Shelley Patterson is an American basketball coach, currently the Head of Domestic Scouting of the Washington Mystics of the Women's National Basketball Association (WNBA).

== College career ==
Patterson played point guard for the Cougars and graduated from Washington State University in 1984.

Patterson shares the single-game record for steals (9) with four other players. She led the team in steals (99) and assists (95) during the 1982-83 season. During the 1980-81 season, she led the team in assists (96). She stands 4th all-time at WSU in career steals with 237 in 84 games played.

== Early career ==
Patterson began her coaching career in the NCAA as a recruiting coordinator for Indiana State University. She later served as an assistant coach with the Philadelphia Rage of the American Basketball League.

== WNBA career ==
Patterson served as Director of Basketball Operations for the Houston Comets during their 1999 championship season. She then served as an assistant coach for the Indiana Fever from 2000 to 2003, and the Phoenix Mercury in 2004.

In 2005, Patterson worked as head coach of the Chicago Blaze of the National Women's Basketball League. Prior to joining the Lynx in 2010, Patterson worked as an assistant coach with the Seattle Storm for three years.

On January 28, 2020, Patterson was named an assistant coach with the New York Liberty. She joined head coach Walt Hopkins in New York, with whom she spent the prior three seasons as an assistant in Minnesota.

One of her specialties as a coach is "shot mechanics and fine-tuning three-point shooting."

On January 27, 2022, Patterson joined the Washington Mystics organization as an assistant coach after spending 2 years with the Liberty.

On March 18, 2025, the Mystics announced that Patterson would transition into a new role as Head of Domestic Scouting.
