= 2013 Indiana Fever season =

14th season in the WNBA

- Head coach: Lin Dunn
- Arena: Bankers Life Fieldhouse

Results
- Record: 16–18 (.471)
- Place: 4th (Eastern)
- Playoff finish: Lost in Conference Finals (0-2, Atlanta Dream)

Media
- Television: FS-I; ESPN2, NBATV
- Radio: WFNI

The 2013 WNBA season was the 14th season for the Indiana Fever of the Women's National Basketball Association.

During preseason practice in May 2013, Shyra Ely-Gash ruptured her right Achilles tendon and was later waived from the Fever roster.

== Draft ==
The following were the Fever's selections in the 2013 WNBA draft:

Round	Pick	Player	Position	Nationality	College	Outcome	Ref.
1	9	Layshia Clarendon	G	United States	California	Signed rookie contract April 18	
2	21	Jasmine Hassell	F	United States	Georgia	Signed rookie contract April 18	
3	33	Jennifer George	F	United States	Florida	Unsigned draft pick	

== Transactions ==
=== Front office and coaching ===
Date	Details	Ref.
July 9	Signed head coach, Lin Dunn, to extension (through 2014 season)	

=== Free agency ===
==== Re-signed / extensions ====
Date	Player	Notes	Ref.
February 4	Tamika Catchings	Multi-year contract (Full details unannounced)	
February 4	Briann January	Multi-year contract (Full details unannounced)	
February 4	Shavonte Zellous	Multi-year contract (Full details unannounced)	
February 21	Erlana Larkins	One-year deal	
May 31	Layshia Clarendon	Set as active	
May 31	Karima Christmas	Exercised team option (Fourth-year)	

==== Additions ====
Date	Player	Notes	Former Team	Ref.
February 21	Laura Harper	Training camp contract	Dynamo Moscow (Russia)	
February 27	Shyra Ely-Gash	Training camp contract	Free agent	
February 27	Jessica Breland	Training camp contract	Free agent	
March 15	Bernice Mosby	Training camp contract	CB Conquero (Spain)	
April 18	Layshia Clarendon	Rookie contract (2013 draft pick – No. 9)	California Golden Bears	
April 18	Jasmine Hassell	Rookie contract (2013 draft pick – No. 21)	Georgia Bulldogs	
May 24	Jasmine Hassell	Hardship contract	Free agent	
June 6	Erin Thorn	Hardship contract	Free agent	
June 21	Jasmine Hassell	Hardship contract	Free agent	
August 27	Jasmine Hassell	Rest of season contract	Free agent	

=== Subtractions / unsigned ===
Date	Player	Reason	New Team	Ref.
April 16	Tammy Sutton-Brown	Retired	N/A	
April 18	Jennifer George	Unsigned draft pick (2013 draft pick – No. 33)	N/A – retained rights	
May 6	Laura Harper	Waived	—	
May 9	Bernice Mosby	Waived	—	
May 16	Shyra Ely-Gash	Waived	—	
May 22	Jasmine Hassell	Waived	—	
May 23	Layshia Clarendon	Suspended contract – temporary (Note: Clarendon was temporarily suspended to allow them to attend their college graduation.)	N/A – retained rights	
May 25	Jasmine Hassell	Released	—	
July 1	Erin Thorn	Released	—	
August 2	Jasmine Hassell	Released	Seattle Storm	
August 25	Sasha Goodlett	Waived	—	
September 13	Jessica Breland	Waived	—	

== Roster ==
2013 Indiana Fever roster
Players
Coaches

Pos.	No.	Nat.	Name	Height	Weight	DOB	From	Yrs
F	24	(United States)	Catchings, Tamika	6' 1" (1.85m)	167 lb (76kg)	1979-07-21	Tennessee	11
G/F	11	(United States)	Christmas, Karima	6' 0" (1.83m)	180 lb (82kg)	1989-09-11	Duke	2
G	5	(United States)	Clarendon, Layshia	5' 9" (1.75m)		1991-05-02	California	R
C	50	(United States)	Davenport, Jessica (injured)	6' 5" (1.96m)	215 lb (98kg)	1985-06-21	Ohio State	6
G/F	23	(United States)	Douglas, Katie (injured)	6' 0" (1.83m)	165 lb (75kg)	1979-05-07	Purdue	12
F	12	(United States)	Hassell, Jasmine	6' 2" (1.88m)	205 lb (93kg)	1991-04-09	Georgia	R
G	20	(United States)	January, Briann	5' 8" (1.73m)	144 lb (65kg)	1987-01-11	Arizona State	4
F	2	(United States)	Larkins, Erlana	6' 1" (1.85m)	202 lb (92kg)	1986-04-02	North Carolina	3
G	13	(Australia)	Phillips, Erin	5' 8" (1.73m)	165 lb (75kg)	1985-05-19	Australia	5
G	32	(United States)	Pohlen, Jeanette	6' 0" (1.83m)	179 lb (81kg)	1989-05-02	Stanford	2
G	1	(United States)	Zellous, Shavonte	5' 10" (1.78m)	155 lb (70kg)	1986-08-28	Pittsburgh	4
F	–	(United States)	George, Jennifer (DP)	6' 0" (1.83m)			Florida	–

Head coach
(United States) Lin Dunn (UT Martin)
Assistant coaches
(United States) Mickie DeMoss (Louisiana Tech)
(United States) Stephanie White (Purdue)
Athletic trainer
(United States) Todd Champlin (Daemen)
Strength and conditioning coach
(United States) Emily Novitsky (Slippery Rock)

Legend

- (C) Team captain
- (DP) Unsigned draft pick
- (FA) Free agent
- (S) Suspended
- Injured

=== Depth ===
Pos.	Starter	Bench
PG	Briann January	Erin Phillips
SG	Katie Douglas	Layshia Clarendon; Jeanette Pohlen
SF	Shavonte Zellous	Karima Christmas
PF	Tamika Catchings	Jasmine Hassell
C	Erlana Larkins	Jessica Davenport

== Season standings ==
#	Eastern Conference					
#	Team	W	L	PCT	GB	GP
1	z-Chicago Sky	24	10	.706	-	34
2	x-Atlanta Dream	17	17	.500	7	34
3	x-Washington Mystics	17	17	.500	7	34
4	x-Indiana Fever	16	18	.471	8	34
5	e-New York Liberty	11	23	.324	13	34
6	e-Connecticut Sun	10	24	.294	14	34

== Schedule ==
=== Preseason ===
2013 pre-season game log
Total: 1–1 (Home: 0–1; Road: 1–0)
Preseason: 1–1 (Home: 0–1; Road: 1–0)

Game	Date	Team	Score	High points	High rebounds	High assists	Location Attendance	Record
1	May 11	@ San Antonio	W 80–75	Tamika Catchings (17)	Tamika Catchings (6)	Briann January (6)	AT&T Center; 4,325	1–0
2	May 15	San Antonio	L 58–64	Sasha Goodlett (9)	Jessica Breland (8)	Briann January (3)	Bankers Life Fieldhouse; 5,339	1–1

2013 season schedule

=== Regular season ===
2013 game log
Total: 16–18 (Home: 9–8; Road: 7–10)
May: 1–1 (Home: 0–1; Road: 1–0)

Game	Date	Team	Score	High points	High rebounds	High assists	Location Attendance	Record
1	May 24	@ San Antonio	W 79–64	Catchings & Zellous (19)	Erlana Larkins (12)	Briann January (5)	AT&T Center; 8,054	1–0
2	May 31	Atlanta	L 77–86	Tamika Catchings (20)	Erlana Larkins (10)	Briann January (7)	Bankers Life Fieldhouse; 10,756	1–1

June : 2–6 (Home: 2–3; Road: 0–3)

Game	Date	Team	Score	High points	High rebounds	High assists	Location Attendance	Record
3	June 5	@ New York	L 68–75 (OT)	Tamika Catchings (21)	Tamika Catchings (8)	Briann January (5)	Prudential Center; 7,617	1–2
4	June 8	Phoenix	L 67–82	Shavonte Zellous (29)	Tamika Catchings (10)	Briann January (5)	Bankers Life Fieldhouse; 8,672	1–3
5	June 12	Connecticut	L 61–73	Shavonte Zellous (14)	Karima Christmas (8)	Layshia Clarendon (4)	Bankers Life Fieldhouse; 6,283	1–4
6	June 16	@ Washington	L 60–64	Shavonte Zellous (17)	Larkins & Breland (7)	Catchings & January (4)	Verizon Center; 6,649	1–5
7	June 22	Chicago	L 61–71	Shavonte Zellous (17)	Jessica Breland (7)	Larkins & January (3)	Bankers Life Fieldhouse; 7,934	1–6
8	June 25	@ Atlanta	L 60–76	Shavonte Zellous (18)	Karima Christmas (10)	Briann January (5)	Philips Arena; 10,155	1–7
9	June 28	Tulsa	W 80–69	Tamika Catchings (28)	Karima Christmas (7)	Briann January (4)	Bankers Life Fieldhouse; 6,957	2–7
10	June 30	Seattle	W 71–63	Tamika Catchings (18)	Jessica Breland (10)	Tamika Catchings (5)	Bankers Life Fieldhouse; 6,355	3–7

July : 5–2 (Home: 2–2; Road: 3–0)

Game	Date	Team	Score	High points	High rebounds	High assists	Location Attendance	Record
11	July 6	Connecticut	W 78–66	Tamika Catchings (22)	Briann January (7)	Christmas, Clarendon, & January (3)	Bankers Life Fieldhouse; 6,383	4–7
12	July 11	Minnesota	L 62–69	Shavonte Zellous (14)	Tamika Catchings (10)	Briann January (4)	Bankers Life Fieldhouse; 10,230	4–8
13	July 13	@ New York	W 74–53	Erlana Larkins (15)	Christmas & Catchings (7)	Tamika Catchings (4)	Prudential Center; 6,772	5–8
14	July 19	Washington	W 77–70	Shavonte Zellous (16)	Erlana Larkins (9)	Briann January (4)	Bankers Life Fieldhouse; 6,434	6–8
15	July 21	@ Washington	W 65–52	Tamika Catchings (23)	Catchings & Larkins (10)	Tamika Catchings (6)	Verizon Center; 6,516	7–8
16	July 23	New York	L 72–77	Briann January (21)	Erlana Larkins (16)	Briann January (4)	Bankers Life Fieldhouse; 7,577	7–9
17	July 25	@ Tulsa	W 71–60	Tamika Catchings (23)	Tamika Catchings (9)	Shavonte Zellous (5)	BOK Center; 5,018	8–9

August : 5–6 (Home: 3–1; Road: 2–5)

Game	Date	Team	Score	High points	High rebounds	High assists	Location Attendance	Record
All-Star Break
18	August 1	@ Connecticut	L 64–70	Shavonte Zellous (20)	Karima Christmas (9)	Briann January (5)	Mohegan Sun Arena; 4,971	8–10
19	August 3	Chicago	W 79–58	Tamika Catchings (17)	Catchings & Larkins (10)	Erin Phillips (3)	Bankers Life Fieldhouse; 8,610	9–10
20	August 6	@ Chicago	W 64–58	Tamika Catchings (18)	Tamika Catchings (8)	Briann January (3)	Allstate Arena; 4.135	10–10
21	August 8	Los Angeles	L 64–74	Tamika Catchings (17)	Erlana Larkins (13)	Shavonte Zellous (4)	Bankers Life Fieldhouse; 7,076	10–11
22	August 10	Atlanta	W 80–66	Tamika Catchings (21)	Erlana Larkins (11)	Briann January (5)	Bankers Life Fieldhouse; 9,271	11–11
23	August 14	@ Phoenix	L 58–75	Tamika Catchings (16)	Tamika Catchings (8)	Briann January (3)	US Airways Center; 6,135	11–12
24	August 16	@ Los Angeles	L 72–94	Catchings & Phillips (16)	Tamika Catchings (6)	Briann January (5)	Staples Center; 11,801	11–13
25	August 17	@ Seattle	L 70–77	Tamika Catchings (21)	Erlana Larkins (9)	Layshia Clarendon (4)	Key Arena; 6,889	11–14
26	August 21	San Antonio	W 80–63	Shavonte Zellous (20)	Catchings & Larkins (7)	Clarendon, January, & Larkins (4)	Bankers Life Fieldhouse; 7,416	12–14
27	August 24	@ Minnesota	L 77–84	Tamika Catchings (22)	Tamika Catchings (10)	Briann January (7)	Target Center; 9,504	12–15
28	August 30	@ New York	W 73–67	Tamika Catchings (22)	Tamika Catchings (10)	Erlana Larkins (4)	Prudential Center; 6,621	13–15

September : 3–3 (Home: 2–1; Road: 1–2)

Game	Date	Team	Score	High points	High rebounds	High assists	Location Attendance	Record
29	September 4	@ Atlanta	L 80–89 (OT)	Tamika Catchings (22)	Erlana Larkins (17)	Layshia Clarendon (5)	Philips Arena; 4,019	13–16
30	September 6	@ Chicago	W 82–77	Briann January (23)	Erlana Larkins (12)	Erlana Larkins (6)	Allstate Arena; 5,996	14–16
31	September 7	Connecticut	W 69–60	Tamika Catchings (15)	Jessica Breland (9)	Layshia Clarendon (6)	Bankers Life Fieldhouse; 9,826	15–16
32	September 10	Washington	L 67–69	Briann January (16)	Erlana Larkins (9)	January & Phillips (4)	Bankers Life Fieldhouse; 8,444	15–17
33	September 13	New York	W 66–63	Tamika Catchings (23)	Tamika Catchings (10)	Briann January (4)	Bankers Life Fieldhouse; 10,571	16–17
34	September 15	@ Connecticut	L 80–82 (OT)	Karima Christmas (21)	Larkins & Pohlen (9)	Clarendon & Larkins (4)	Mohegan Sun Arena; 8,478	16–18

2013 season schedule

=== Playoffs ===
2013 playoff game log
Total: 2–2 (Home: 1–1; Road: 1–1)
Conference Semifinals
Won Series: 2–0 (Home: 1–0; Road: 1–0)

Game	Date	Team	Score	High points	High rebounds	High assists	Location Attendance	Series
1	September 20	@ Chicago	W 85–72	Shavonte Zellous (20)	Erlana Larkins (11)	Briann January (6)	Allstate Arena; 5,895	1–0
2	September 22	Chicago	W 79–57	Tamika Catchings (18)	Tamika Catchings (12)	Briann January (4)	Bankers Life Fieldhouse; 7,144	2–0

Conference Finals
Lost Series: 0–2 (Home: 0–1; Road: 0–1)

Game	Date	Team	Score	High points	High rebounds	High assists	Location Attendance	Series
1	September 26	@ Atlanta	L 79–84	Tamika Catchings (21)	Erlana Larkins (12)	Christmas & Clarendon (4)	Philips Arena; 4,238	0–1
2	September 29	Atlanta	L 53–67	Tamika Catchings (24)	Erlana Larkins (7)	Shavonte Zellous (3)	Bankers Life Fieldhouse; 7,051	0–2

2013 season schedule

== Playoffs bracket ==
**Conference semifinals** Best-of-3
E1	Chicago Sky	0
E4	**Indiana Fever**	**2**
Eastern Conference
E2	**Atlanta Dream**	**2**
E3	Washington Mystics	1
W1	**Minnesota Lynx**	**2**
W4	Seattle Storm	0
Western Conference
W2	Los Angeles Sparks	1
W3	**Phoenix Mercury**	**2**

**Conference finals** Best-of-3
E4	Indiana Fever	0
E2	**Atlanta Dream**	**2**
W1	**Minnesota Lyx**	**2**
W3	Phoenix Mercury	0

**WNBA Finals**; Best-of-5
E2	Atlanta Dream	0
W1	**Minnesota Lynx**	**3**

- **Bold** – Series winner
- Italics – Team with home-court advantage

== Statistics ==
Legend
GP	Games played	GS	Games started	MPG	Minutes per game	RPG	Rebounds per game
APG	Assists per game	SPG	Steals per game	BPG	Blocks per game	PPG	Points per game
FG%	Field-goal percentage	3P%	3-point field-goal percentage	FT%	Free-throw percentage	TO	Turnovers per game
PF	Fouls per game		Team leader		League leader

=== Regular season ===
2013 Indiana Fever regular season statistics
Player	GP	GS	MPG	FG%	3P%	FT%	RPG	APG	SPG	BPG	TO	PF	PPG
Tamika Catchings	30	30	31.4	.396	.321	.861	7.1	2.4	2.8	1.0	1.7	2.5	17.7
Katie Douglas	4	4	35.8	.389	.259	1.000	2.8	1.5	1.8	0.5	2.8	0.8	15.0
Shavonte Zellous	29	29	31.3	.415	.348	.780	3.4	1.7	0.9	0.7	1.9	3.2	14.7
Briann January	32	32	29.6	.348	.357	.811	2.4	3.7	1.1	0.2	2.5	2.6	9.8
Karima Christmas	34	28	26.9	.373	.300	.811	4.1	1.1	1.9	0.3	1.2	2.4	8.6
Erlana Larkins	34	34	30.1	.545	—	.708	7.8	1.9	1.4	0.3	1.4	2.9	7.9
Erin Phillips	18	6	21.3	.367	.479	.750	1.1	1.6	0.8	0.1	0.8	1.2	5.9
Jessica Breland ^{‡}	30	2	14.6	.439	—	.741	4.0	0.6	0.6	1.0	1.1	1.3	5.3
Layshia Clarendon	30	4	19.4	.331	.259	.409	1.8	1.8	0.5	0.0	1.3	2.2	4.2
Jeanette Pohlen	13	0	14.7	.342	.375	1.000	1.9	0.3	0.5	0.1	0.8	0.8	3.2
Jasmine Hassell ^{‡} ^{≠}	18	0	8.5	.267	.000	.471	1.1	0.4	0.2	0.1	0.4	1.2	1.8
Sasha Goodlett ^{‡}	25	1	7.5	.358	—	.857	1.6	0.2	0.1	0.1	0.4	0.7	1.8
Erin Thorn ^{≠} ^{‡}	6	0	11.2	.167	.167	1.000	0.5	0.7	0.3	0.2	0.8	0.3	1.2
Jessica Davenport	Did not play (season-ending injury)												

^{‡}Waived/Released during the season
^{†}Traded during the season
^{≠}Acquired during the season

=== Playoffs ===
2013 Indiana Fever playoffs statistics
Player	GP	GS	MPG	FG%	3P%	FT%	RPG	APG	SPG	BPG	TO	PF	PPG
Tamika Catchings	4	4	31.0	.431	.333	.781	7.8	2.5	1.5	0.8	2.3	2.5	18.5
Shavonte Zellous	4	4	26.5	.447	.417	.923	3.8	2.0	0.3	0.5	0.0	3.0	12.8
Erlana Larkins	4	4	33.5	.567	—	1.000	10.3	1.3	0.3	1.5	2.5	3.8	10.8
Karima Christmas	4	4	30.8	.400	.286	.625	6.0	2.3	1.0	0.5	3.5	3.8	10.8
Briann January	4	4	29.8	.370	.444	.857	2.8	3.5	0.5	0.0	2.0	3.0	7.5
Layshia Clarendon	4	0	15.3	.476	.600	.250	0.5	2.0	0.5	0.0	1.5	1.5	6.0
Erin Phillips	4	0	21.8	.438	.400	1.000	1.3	1.3	0.8	0.0	1.0	1.5	5.5
Jeanette Pohlen	3	0	11.0	.308	.111	—	1.0	0.3	0.0	0.3	0.3	1.3	3.0
Jasmine Hassell	3	0	4.0	.000	—	—	0.7	0.3	0.0	0.0	0.7	1.3	0.0
Jessica Davenport	Did not play (season-ending injury)												
Katie Douglas	Did not play (season-ending injury)												

== Awards and honors ==
Recipient	Award	Date awarded	Ref.
Tamika Catchings	WNBA All-Star Starter	July 18	
Tamika Catchings	Eastern Conference Player of the Week	July 21	
Tamika Catchings	Eastern Conference Player of the Week	September 1	
Tamika Catchings	Kim Perrot Sportsmanship Award	September 20	
Tamika Catchings	WNBA All-Defensive First Team	September 20	
Tamika Catchings	All-WNBA Second Team	September 25	
Lin Dunn	WNBA All-Star Head Coach	July 18	
Briann January	WNBA All-Defensive Second Team	September 20	
Shavonte Zellous	WNBA All-Star Reserve	July 24	
Shavonte Zellous	WNBA Most Improved Player	September 22	
