= 2013 Atlanta Dream season =

- Head coach: Fred Williams
- Arena: Philips Arena

Results
- Record: 17–17 (.500)
- Place: 2nd (Eastern)
- Playoff finish: WNBA Finals (lost to Minnesota 0–3)

Media
- Television: FS-S, SSO; ESPN2, NBATV

The 2013 Atlanta Dream season was the 6th season for the Atlanta Dream of the Women's National Basketball Association, and their 1st season under head coach,Fred Williams. The Dream finished second in the Eastern Conference with a 17-17 record, and won the Eastern Conference Finals, sweeping the Indiana Fever to earn their third trip in four years to the WNBA Finals, where they were swept by the Minnesota Lynx in three games. The Dream would not return to the WNBA Finals again until 2026.

== Transactions ==
=== WNBA draft ===
Round	Pick	Player	Nationality	School/Team/Country
2	13	Alex Bentley	United States	Penn State
3	31	Anne Marie Armstrong	United States	Georgia

=== Trades and Roster Changes ===
Date	Trade
January 8, 2013	Extended Qualifying Offers to Angel McCoughtry and Aneika Henry
February 5, 2013	Signed Angel McCoughtry
February 14, 2013	Signed Aneika Henry
February 19, 2013	Traded the 7th and 19th Picks in the 2013 WNBA draft to the Washington Mystics in exchange for Jasmine Thomas and the 13th Pick in the 2013 Draft
March 18, 2013	Signed Sydney Carter to a Training Camp Contract
April 19, 2013	Signed Alex Bentley and Anne Marie Armstrong to their Rookie Scale Contracts
April 25, 2013	Signed Blanche Alverson to a Training Camp Contract
April 30, 2013	Signed Courtney Clements to a Training Camp Contract
May 14, 2013	Waived Blance Alverson and Ketia Swanier
May 22, 2013	Waived Cathrine Kraayeveld and Sydney Carter
May 23, 2013	Temporarily Suspend the contract of Yelena Leuchanka
May 31, 2013	Exercised the Team Option for the 4th Year on Jasmine Thomas
June 17, 2013	Temporarily Suspend the contract of Sancho Lyttle
July 5, 2013	Activated Sancho Lyttle from her Temporary Suspension
July 5, 2013	Waived Anne Marie Armstrong
August 28, 2013	Signed Anne Marie Armstrong to a 7-Day Contract

== Roster ==
2013 Atlanta Dream roster
Players
Coaches

Pos.	No.	Nat.	Name	Height	Weight	From
G	2	(United States)	Bentley, Alex	5' 7" (1.7m)	152 lb (69kg)	Penn State
G	54	(United States)	Clements, Courtney	6' 0" (1.83m)	157 lb (71kg)	San Diego State
F/C	14	(Brazil)	de Souza, Erika	6' 5" (1.96m)	190 lb (86kg)	Brazil
G	15	(United States)	Hayes, Tiffany	5' 10" (1.78m)	155 lb (70kg)	Connecticut
F/C	13	(Jamaica)	Henry-Morello, Aneika	6' 4" (1.93m)	192 lb (87kg)	Florida
F	20	(Spain)	Lyttle, Sancho	6' 5" (1.96m)	175 lb (79kg)	Houston
G/F	35	(United States)	McCoughtry, Angel	6' 1" (1.85m)	173 lb (78kg)	Louisville
G	22	(United States)	Herrington, Armintie	5' 9" (1.75m)	132 lb (60kg)	Mississippi
C	0	(United States)	Riley, Ruth	6' 5" (1.96m)	198 lb (90kg)	Notre Dame
G	5	(United States)	Thomas, Jasmine	5' 9" (1.75m)	143 lb (65kg)	Duke
F	43	(United States)	Willingham, Le'Coe	6' 0" (1.83m)	200 lb (91kg)	Auburn

Head coach
(United States) Fred Williams (Boise State)
Assistant coaches
(United States) Joe Ciampi (Mansfield State)
(United States) Julie Plank (Ohio State)

Legend

- (C) Team captain
- (DP) Unsigned draft pick
- (FA) Free agent
- (S) Suspended
- Injured

== Schedule ==
=== Preseason ===
2013 Game Log: Preseason
Total: 1–0 (Home: 0–0; Road: 1–0)

1	May 9	@ Tulsa	W 72–58	Courtney Clements (18)	Aneika Henry (10)	Armintie Herrington (3)	BOK Center; 5280	1–0

2013 season schedule

=== Regular season ===
2013 Regular Season
Total: 17–17 (Home: 13–4; Road: 4–13)
May: 2–0 (Home: 1–0; Road: 1–0)

Game	Date	Opponent	Score	High points	High rebounds	High assists	Location/Attendance	Record
4	May 25	Tulsa	W 98–81	Tiffany Hayes (21)	Sancho Lyttle (10)	Jasmine Thomas (6)	Philips Arena; 7519	1–0
5	May 31	@ Indiana	W 86–77	Angel McCoughtry (29)	Sancho Lyttle (11)	Alex Bentley (6)	Bankers Life Fieldhouse; 10756	2–0

June: 8–1 (Home: 6–0; Road: 2–1)

Game	Date	Opponent	Score	High points	High rebounds	High assists	Location/Attendance	Record
6	June 2	@ Washington	W 73–63	Angel McCoughtry (15)	Sancho Lyttle (9)	Angel McCoughtry (5)	Verizon Center; 8938	3–0
7	June 7	New York	W 75–56	Sancho Lyttle (18)	Tiffany Hayes (7)	Angel McCoughtry (10)	Philips Arena; 6173	4–0
8	June 9	@ New York	L 67–76	Sancho Lyttle (18)	Sancho Lyttle (11)	Angel McCoughtry (5)	Prudential Center; 5933	4–1
9	June 14	Seattle	W 68–59	Angel McCoughtry (23)	Angel McCoughtry (9)	Angel McCoughtry (7)	Philips Arena; 4960	5–1
10	June 16	Chicago	W 88–74	Angel McCoughtry (23)	Erika de Souza (11)	Tiffany Hayes (8)	Philips Arena; 5552	6–1
11	June 23	@ Connecticut	W 78–77	Angel McCoughtry (34)	Le'Coe Willingham (7)	Angel McCoughtry (2)	Mohegan Sun Arena; 7557	7–1
12	June 25	Indiana	W 76–60	Erika de Souza (17)	Erika de Souza (10)	McCoughtry & Herrington (4)	Philips Arena; 10155	8–1
13	June 28	Washington	W 86–75	Angel McCoughtry (21)	Erika de Souza (9)	Tiffany Hayes (6)	Philips Arena; 5512	9–1
14	June 30	San Antonio	W 93–67	Tiffany Hayes (19)	Erika de Souza (7)	Angel McCoughtry (9)	Philips Arena; 5359	10–1

July: 1–4 (Home: 1–0; Road: 0–4)

Game	Date	Opponent	Score	High points	High rebounds	High assists	Location/Attendance	Record
15	July 9	@ Minnesota	L 72–94	Angel McCoughtry (16)	Erika de Souza (13)	Angel McCoughtry (5)	Target Center; 8623	10–2
16	July 14	@ Seattle	L 65–73	de Souza; Bentley (16)	Erika de Souza (14)	Alex Bentley (5)	Key Arena; 6479	10–3
17	July 17	@ Los Angeles	L 73–77	Angel McCoughtry (24)	Erika de Souza (18)	Angel McCoughtry (5)	Staples Center; 10876	10–4
18	July 21	@ Tulsa	L 63–90	Angel McCoughtry (21)	Erika de Souza (16)	Alex Bentley (3)	BOK Center; 4107	10–5
19	July 24	Connecticut	W 74–65	Angel McCoughtry (22)	Erika de Souza (10)	Angel McCoughtry (6)	Philips Arena; 4434	11–5

August: 3–8 (Home: 3–3; Road: 0–5)

Game	Date	Opponent	Score	High points	High rebounds	High assists	Location/Attendance	Record
All-Star Break
20	August 3	@ Phoenix	L 76–82	Angel McCoughtry (33)	Erika de Souza (11)	Angel McCoughtry (8)	US Airways Center; 8138	11–6
21	August 10	@ Indiana	L 66–80	Angel McCoughtry (17)	Erika de Souza (5)	Alex Bentley (5)	Bankers Life Fieldhouse; 9271	11–7
22	August 11	New York	L 82–88	Angel McCoughtry (30)	Erika de Souza (10)	McCoughtry & Thomas (5)	Philips Arena; 4576	11–8
23	August 14	@ Connecticut	L 86–88	Angel McCoughtry (33)	McCoughtry & de Souza (8)	Armintie Herrington (6)	Mohegan Sun Arena; 5206	11–9
24	August 16	Connecticut	W 88–57	Angel McCoughtry (30)	Erika de Souza (15)	Angel McCoughtry (8)	Philips Arena; 4435	12–9
25	August 18	Washington	W 76–58	Tiffany Hayes (23)	Erika de Souza (8)	Jasmine Thomas (4)	Philips Arena; 4873	13–9
26	August 20	Minnesota	W 88–75	Tiffany Hayes (23)	Erika de Souza (16)	Alex Bentley (6)	Philips Arena; 4855	14–9
27	August 23	@ Washington	L 64–74	Angel McCoughtry (17)	Erika de Souza (12)	Angel McCoughtry (8)	Verizon Center; 7088	14–10
28	August 24	Chicago	L 56–67	Angel McCoughtry (20)	Erika de Souza (16)	Angel McCoughtry (3)	Philips Arena; 7412	14–11
29	August 28	Washington	L 80–85 (OT)	Angel McCoughtry (23)	Erika de Souza (14)	Alex Bentley (7)	Philips Arena; 4415	14–12
30	August 31	@ Chicago	L 68–85	Alex Bentley (19)	Erika de Souza (9)	Jasmine Thomas (6)	Allstate Arena; 6047	14–13

September: 3–4 (Home:2–1; Road: 1–3)

Game	Date	Opponent	Score	High points	High rebounds	High assists	Location/Attendance	Record
31	September 2	Los Angeles	W 92–82	Erika de Souza (27)	Jasmine Thomas (8)	Alex Bentley (11)	Philips Arena; 5504	15–13
32	September 4	Indiana	W 89–80 (OT)	Angel McCoughtry (30)	Erika de Souza (15)	Angel McCoughtry (8)	Philips Arena; 4019	16–13
33	September 6	@ New York	W 70–57	Angel McCoughtry (16)	Erika de Souza (14)	Angel McCoughtry (3)	Prudential Center; 7021	17–13
34	September 8	Phoenix	L 71–79	Angel McCoughtry (25)	Erika de Souza (10)	Armintie Herrington (5)	Philips Arena; 9740	17–14
35	September 11	@ Connecticut	L 77–78	Angel McCoughtry (23)	Angel McCoughtry (10)	Angel McCoughtry (7)	Mohegan Sun Arena; 5724	17–15
36	September 13	@ Chicago	L 82–87	Angel McCoughtry (29)	Erika de Souza (13)	Jasmine Thomas (6)	Allstate Arena; 7679	17–16
37	September 15	@ San Antonio	L 68–97	Alex Bentley (17)	Aneika Henry (10)	Jasmine Thomas (6)	AT&T Center; 7486	17–17

2013 season schedule

== Standings ==
#	Eastern Conference					
#	Team	W	L	PCT	GB	GP
1	z-Chicago Sky	24	10	.706	-	34
2	x-Atlanta Dream	17	17	.500	7	34
3	x-Washington Mystics	17	17	.500	7	34
4	x-Indiana Fever	16	18	.471	8	34
5	e-New York Liberty	11	23	.324	13	34
6	e-Connecticut Sun	10	24	.294	14	34

=== Playoffs ===
2013 Playoffs: Total: 4–4 (Home: 2–2; Road: 2–2)
Eastern Semifinals vs. Washington (Win Series 2-1)

Game	Date	Opponent	Score	High points	High rebounds	High assists	Location/Attendance	Record
1	September 19	Washington	L 56–71	Angel McCoughtry (20)	Erika de Souza (12)	Angel McCoughtry (3)	Philips Arena; 3862	0–1
2	September 21	@ Washington	W 63–45	Angel McCoughtry (20)	Erika de Souza (15)	Jasmine Thomas (6)	Verizon Center; 7065	1–1
3	September 23	Washington	W 80–72	de Souza & Hayes (18)	Erika de Souza (14)	Angel McCoughtry (7)	Philips Arena; 4078	2–1

Eastern Finals vs. Indiana (Win Series 2-0)

Game	Date	Opponent	Score	High points	High rebounds	High assists	Location/Attendance	Record
1	September 26	Indiana	W 84–79	Tiffany Hayes (23)	Armintie Herrington (7)	Herrington & McCoughtry (5)	Philips Arena; 4238	1–0
2	September 29	@ Indiana	W 67–53	Angel McCoughtry (27)	Armintie Herrington (9)	Angel McCoughtry (3)	Bankers Life Fieldhouse; 7051	2–0

WNBA Finals vs. Minnesota (Lost Series 0-3)

Game	Date	Opponent	Score	High points	High rebounds	High assists	Location/Attendance	Record
1	October 6	@ Minnesota	L 59–84	Angel McCoughtry (17)	Aneika Henry (14)	Armintie Herrington (3)	Target Center; 13804	0–1
2	October 8	@ Minnesota	L 63–88	Angel McCoughtry (15)	Erika de Souza (8)	Angel McCoughtry (4)	Target Center; 12313	0–2
3	October 10	Minnesota	L 77–86	Tiffany Hayes (20)	Erika de Souza (9)	Alex Bentley (6)	Gwinnett Center; 5040	0–3

2013 season schedule

== Playoffs ==
**Conference semifinals** Best-of-3
E1	Chicago	0
E4	**Indiana**	**2**
Eastern Conference
E2	**Atlanta**	**2**
E3	Washington	1
W1	**Minnesota**	**2**
W4	Seattle	0
Western Conference
W2	Los Angeles	1
W3	**Phoenix**	**2**

**Conference finals** Best-of-3
E4	Indiana	0
E2	**Atlanta**	**2**
W1	**Minnesota**	**2**
W3	Phoenix	0

**WNBA Finals**; Best-of-5
E2	Atlanta	0
W1	**Minnesota**	**3**

- **Bold** – Series winner
- Italics – Team with home-court advantage

== Statistics ==
Legend
GP	Games played	GS	Games started	MPG	Minutes per game	RPG	Rebounds per game
APG	Assists per game	SPG	Steals per game	BPG	Blocks per game	PPG	Points per game
FG%	Field-goal percentage	3P%	3-point field-goal percentage	FT%	Free-throw percentage	TO	Turnovers per game
PF	Fouls per game		Team leader		League leader

=== Regular season ===
Player	GP	GS	MPG	FG%	3P%	FT%	RPG	APG	SPG	BPG	PPG
Angel McCoughtry	33	32	31.4	41.3	20.4	82.4	5.3	4.4	2.7	0.7	21.5
Sancho Lyttle	6	6	30.0	52.9	40.0	66.7	8.5	2.5	2.3	1.3	14.3
Erika de Souza	34	34	29.9	52.9	0.0	67.7	9.9	1.3	1.3	1.8	12.9
Tiffany Hayes	23	4	22.3	40.6	37.7	74.5	3.7	1.7	1.2	0.1	11.3
Jasmine Thomas	34	29	27.5	35.9	21.6	69.6	3.0	3.1	0.9	0.3	8.5
Alex Bentley	34	10	22.1	39.8	32.9	71.1	1.4	2.8	1.0	0.1	8.3
Armintie Herrington	28	26	29.9	46.7	0.0	59.1	3.4	2.4	2.3	0.1	7.0
Le'Coe Willingham	34	28	22.2	42.4	30.4	71.4	4.2	0.8	0.8	0.3	4.1
Aneika Henry-Morello	34	1	12.8	45.0	0.0	76.5	3.9	0.5	0.3	0.5	3.9
Courtney Clements	26	0	9.4	20.2	23.1	75.0	0.9	0.3	0.2	0.1	2.2
Ruth Riley	16	0	7.6	31.6	40.0	66.7	0.8	0.2	0.2	0.3	1.1
Anne Marie Armstrong	9	0	2.8	50.0	50.0	0.0	0.4	0.0	0.1	0.0	0.7

=== Playoffs ===
Player	GP	GS	MPG	FG%	3P%	FT%	RPG	APG	SPG	BPG	PPG
Angel McCoughtry	8	8	30.9	31.4	25.0	83.0	3.6	3.8	2.0	1.0	17.9
Tiffany Hayes	8	6	28.6	39.0	35.3	76.7	4.5	1.9	0.5	0.0	12.4
Erika de Souza	8	8	30.8	47.0	0.0	58.8	9.9	1.3	1.0	0.8	11.0
Armintie Herrington	8	5	27.4	51.0	0.0	63.2	4.5	2.3	1.9	0.1	7.8
Jasmine Thomas	8	8	28.9	31.0	0.0	70.0	2.9	2.0	0.9	0.8	6.4
Aneika Henry-Morello	8	3	22.8	55.0	0.0	83.3	6.6	0.3	0.6	0.9	6.1
Alex Bentley	8	0	17.4	28.3	19.0	88.9	1.8	2.0	1.1	0.3	5.8
Ruth Riley	4	0	6.5	75.0	100.0	50.0	0.5	0.3	0.0	0.0	2.0
Le'Coe Willingham	4	2	18.0	10.0	0.0	0.0	1.8	1.0	0.8	0.3	0.5
Courtney Clements	4	0	2.3	0.0	0.0	50.0	0.5	0.0	0.3	0.3	0.3

== Awards and honors ==
Recipient	Award	Date awarded	Ref.
Angel McCoughtry	Eastern Conference Player of the Week	May 24 - June 2	
Angel McCoughtry	Eastern Conference Player of the Week	June 10 - June 16	
Angel McCoughtry	Eastern Conference Player of the Week	June 17 - June 23	
Angel McCoughtry	Eastern Conference Player of the Month - June	July 1	
Angel McCoughtry	Peak Performer: Points	September 18	
Angel McCoughtry	All-WNBA Second Team	September 25	
Angel McCoughtry	All-Star Selection	July 23	
Angel McCoughtry	All-Defensive First Team	September 20	
Erika de Souza	All-Star Selection	July 23	
Erika de Souza	All-Defensive Second Team	September 20	
Armintie Herrington	All-Defensive First Team	September 20	
Alex Bentley	All-Rookie Team	September 20	
