= 2014 Indiana Fever season =

15th season in the WNBA

- Head coach: Lin Dunn
- Arena: Bankers Life Fieldhouse

Results
- Record: 16–18 (.471)
- Place: 2nd (Eastern)
- Playoff finish: Lost conference finals 2-1 (Chicago)

Media
- Television: FS-I; ESPN2, NBATV
- Radio: WFNI

The 2014 WNBA season was the 15th season for the Indiana Fever of the Women's National Basketball Association. This was Fever's seventh and final season under head coach, Lin Dunn. In the preseason, Dunn announced her plans to step down at the end of the 2014 season. Their season tipped off on May 16.

Fever star forward, Tamika Catchings missed the first seventeen games of the 2014 season due to a back injury she described as a "pinched disc." During that time without Catchings, the Fever went 8–9. She returned to play on July 5 against the San Antonio Stars in a close 70–71 loss with Catchings contributing 6 points, 7 rebounds, and 4 assists in 20 minutes played for the Fever.

The Fever finished the season with a record of 16–18, which placed them second in the Eastern Conference and fifth overall. In the 2014 WNBA playoffs, the Fever swept the Washington Mystics in the conference semi-finals. In the conference finals against the Chicago Sky, the Fever took game 1 at home but ultimately lost the series 1–2.

== Draft ==
Round	Pick	Player	Position	Nationality	College	Outcome	Ref.
1	5	Natasha Howard	F	United States	Florida State	Made opening day roster	
1	9	Natalie Achonwa	F/C	Canada	Notre Dame	Unsigned draft pick for 2014 season	
3	29	Haiden Palmer	G	United States	Gonzaga	Waived on May 12	

== Transactions ==
=== Front office and coaching ===
Date	Details	Ref.
May 6, 2014	Announced Lin Dunn will step down as head coach at conclusion of 2014 season	

=== Trades ===
March
March 11	To Indiana Fever Lynetta Kizer; 2014 No. 9 draft pick (Natalie Achonwa)	To Phoenix Mercury Erin Phillips
May
May 12	To Indiana Fever Maggie Lucas	To Phoenix Mercury 2015 No. 18 draft pick (Alex Harden)

=== Free agency ===
==== Re-signed / extensions ====
Player	Date	Notes	Ref.
Erlana Larkins	April 1	Multi-year contract	
Jasmine Hassell	April 2	Training camp contract	

==== Additions ====
Player	Date	Notes	Former Team	Ref.
Marissa Coleman	March 28	Multi-year contract	Los Angeles Sparks	
Jennifer George	April 9	Rookie contract (2013 draft pick – No. 33)	Florida Gators	
Ziomara Morrison	April 9	Training camp contract	Ceyhan Belediyespor (Turkey)	
Natasha Howard	April 17	Rookie contract (2014 draft pick – No. 5)	Florida State Seminoles	
Haiden Palmer	April 17	Rookie contract (2014 draft pick – No. 29)	Gonzaga Bulldogs	
Jennifer Schlott	April 17	Training camp contract	Utah State Aggies	
Victoria Macaulay	April 26	Training camp contract	Lavezzini Parma (Italy)	
Jeterra Bonds	April 28	Training camp contract	Florida Gators	
Sydney Carter	May 9	Training camp contract	Connecticut Sun	
Krystal Thomas	May 19	Training camp contract	Phoenix Mercury	

=== Subtractions / Unsigned ===
Player	Date	Reason	New Team	Ref.
Katie Douglas	March 24	Free agency	Connecticut Sun	
Jessica Davenport	April 13	Retirement	N/A	
Natalie Achonwa	April 14	Unsigned draft pick (2014 draft pick – No. 9)	N/A – retained rights	
Jennifer George	April 30	Waived	—	
Jennifer Schlott	April 30	Waived	—	
Jeterra Bonds	May 12	Waived	—	
Ziomara Morrison	May 12	Waived	—	
Haiden Palmer	May 12	Waived	—	
Victoria Macaulay	May 14	Waived	—	
Jeanette Pohlen	May 14	Waived	—	
Jasmine Hassell	May 19	Waived	—	

== Roster ==
2014 Indiana Fever roster
Players
Coaches

Pos.	No.	Nat.	Name	Height	Weight	DOB	From	Yrs
G	4	(United States)	Carter, Sydney	5' 6" (1.68m)	133 lb (60kg)	1990-11-18	Texas A&M	2
F	24	(United States)	Catchings, Tamika	6' 1" (1.85m)	167 lb (76kg)	1979-07-21	Tennessee	11
G/F	13	(United States)	Christmas, Karima	6' 0" (1.83m)	180 lb (82kg)	1989-09-11	Duke	2
G	5	(United States)	Clarendon, Layshia	5' 9" (1.75m)	140 lb (64kg)	1991-05-02	California	R
G/F	25	(United States)	Coleman, Marissa	6' 1" (1.85m)	160 lb (73kg)	1987-01-04	Maryland	5
F	33	(United States)	Howard, Natasha	6' 3" (1.91m)	169 lb (77kg)	1991-09-02	Florida State	R
G	20	(United States)	January, Briann	5' 8" (1.73m)	144 lb (65kg)	1987-01-11	Arizona State	4
F	11	(United States)	Kizer, Lynetta	6' 4" (1.93m)	230 lb (104kg)	1990-04-04	Maryland	2
F	2	(United States)	Larkins, Erlana	6' 1" (1.85m)	202 lb (92kg)	1986-04-02	North Carolina	3
G	8	(United States)	Lucas, Maggie	5' 10" (1.78m)	162 lb (73kg)	1991-11-29	Penn State	R
C	34	(United States)	Thomas, Krystal	6' 5" (1.96m)	210 lb (95kg)	1989-06-10	Duke	3
G	1	(United States)	Zellous, Shavonte	5' 10" (1.78m)	155 lb (70kg)	1986-08-28	Pittsburgh	4
F/C	–	(Canada)	Achonwa, Natalie (DP)	6' 3" (1.91m)	198 lb (90kg)	1992-11-22	Notre Dame	–

Head coach
(United States) Lin Dunn (UT Martin)
Assistant coaches
(United States) Stephanie White (Purdue)
(United States) Sylvia Crawley (North Carolina)
Player development
(United States) Carlos Knox (IUPUI)
Athletic trainer
(United States) Todd Champlin (Daemen)
Strength and conditioning coach
(United States) Emily Burgess (Slippery Rock)

Legend

- (C) Team captain
- (DP) Unsigned draft pick
- (FA) Free agent
- (S) Suspended
- Injured

=== Depth ===
Pos.	Starter	Bench
PG	Briann January	Sydney Carter
SG	Shavonte Zellous	Layshia Clarendon; Maggie Lucas
SF	Marissa Coleman	Karima Christmas
PF	Tamika Catchings	Natasha Howard
C	Erlana Larkins	Lynetta Kizer; Krystal Thomas

== Schedule ==
=== Preseason ===
2014 pre-season game log
Total: 1–3 (Home: 1–1; Road: 0–2)
May: 1–3 (Home: 1–1; Road: 0–2)

Game	Date	Team	Score	High points	High rebounds	High assists	Location Attendance	Record
1	May 6	Washington	L 63–80	Natasha Howard (14)	Victoria Macaulay (7)	Briann January (4)	Bankers Life Fieldhouse; 4,275	0–1
2	May 7	@ Washington	L 80–81	Marissa Coleman (21)	Natasha Howard (7)	Layshia Clarendon (5)	Capital One Arena; 2,720	0–2
3	May 9	@ Chicago	L 66–73	Karima Christmas (16)	Lynetta Kizer (10)	Sydney Carter (3)	ESPN Wide World of Sports Complex	0–3
4	May 11	Phoenix	W 75–60	Natasha Howard (16)	Lynetta Kizer (7)	Clarendon, Coleman (3)	ESPN Wide World of Sports Complex; 3,194	1–3

2014 pre-season schedule

=== Regular season ===
2014 game log
Total: 16–18 (Home: 7–10; Road: 9–8)
May: 3–3 (Home: 2–2; Road: 1–1)

Game	Date	Team	Score	High points	High rebounds	High assists	Location Attendance	Record
1	May 16	@ Chicago	L 71–74	Natasha Howard (16)	Natasha Howard (10)	Briann January (6)	Allstate Arena; 6,721	0–1
2	May 17	Atlanta	L 88–90	Natasha Howard (21)	Erlana Larkins (13)	Briann January (5)	Bankers Life Fieldhouse; 8,275	0–2
3	May 23	Washington	L 63–79	Maggie Lucas (12)	Erlana Larkins (12)	Briann January (4)	Bankers Life Fieldhouse; 5,632	0–3
4	May 25	@ Atlanta	W 82–77	Briann January (16)	Erlana Larkins (22)	Briann January (7)	Philips Arena; 5,517	1–3
5	May 29	Connecticut	W 79–65	Briann January (20)	Erlana Larkins (10)	Marissa Coleman (5)	Bankers Life Fieldhouse; 6,305	2–3
6	May 31	New York	W 70–66	Briann January (20)	Howard, Larkins (7)	Briann January (7)	Bankers Life Fieldhouse; 7,025	3–3

June : 3–6 (Home: 1–3; Road: 2–3)

Game	Date	Team	Score	High points	High rebounds	High assists	Location Attendance	Record
7	June 6	@ Washington	W 64–61	Marissa Coleman (20)	Erlana Larkins (9)	Erlana Larkins (5)	Capital One Arena; 7,155	4–3
8	June 7	@ Connecticut	L 71–88	Natasha Howard (14)	Erlana Larkins (7)	Erlana Larkins (6)	Mohegan Sun Arena; 5,105	4–4
9	June 11	Seattle	W 76–68	Erlana Larkins (17)	Erlana Larkins (11)	Briann January (5)	Bankers Life Fieldhouse; 7,925	5–4
10	June 17	@ Connecticut	L 67–89	Lynetta Kizer (13)	Lynetta Kizer (10)	Briann January (3)	Mohegan Sun Arena; 4,356	5–5
11	June 20	@ Chicago	W 83–75	Karima Christmas (14)	Erlana Larkins (11)	Briann January (7)	Allstate Arena; 6,488	6–5
12	June 22	@ Minnesota	L 77–83	Karima Christmas (18)	Erlana Larkins (10)	Briann January (4)	Target Center; 8,704	6–6
13	June 25	Tulsa	L 102–107 (OT)	Shavonte Zellous (33)	Erlana Larkins (9)	Briann January (6)	Bankers Life Fieldhouse; 7,367	6–7
14	June 27	Phoenix	L 76–81	Shavonte Zellous (18)	Erlana Larkins (11)	Briann January (7)	Bankers Life Fieldhouse; 7,762	6–8
15	June 29	Atlanta	L 68–76	Shavonte Zellous (18)	Erlana Larkins (12)	Erlana Larkins (4)	Bankers Life Fieldhouse; 8.014	6–9

July : 7–5 (Home: 2–3; Road: 5–2)

Game	Date	Team	Score	High points	High rebounds	High assists	Location Attendance	Record
16	July 1	@ Atlanta	W 77–70	Karima Christmas (18)	Karima Christmas (9)	Erlana Larkins (5)	Allstate Arena; 5,037	7–9
17	July 2	@ Washington	W 80–77	Natasha Howard (20)	Erlana Larkins (7)	Carter, Larkins (3)	Capital One Arena; 7,096	8–9
18	July 5	San Antonio	L 70–71	Shavonte Zellous (16)	Catchings, Larkins (5)	Catchings, Larkins (7)	Bankers Life Fieldhouse; 8,531	8–10
19	July 8	@ Tulsa	W 78–76	Tamika Catchings (23)	Tamika Catchings (11)	Erlana Larkins (5)	BOK Center; 4,107	9–10
20	July 10	Connecticut	W 72–68	Tamika Catchings (21)	Tamika Catchings (7)	Clarendon, January (3)	Bankers Life Fieldhouse; 10,440	10–10
21	July 12	Atlanta	L 74–93	Tamika Catchings (14)	Erlana Larkins (11)	Tamika Catchings (4)	Bankers Life Fieldhouse; 8,562	10–11
22	July 15	Los Angeles	L 78–86	Tamika Catchings (25)	Erlana Larkins (10)	Shavonte Zellous (5)	Bankers Life Fieldhouse; 7,835	10–12
23	July 17	Chicago	W 82–64	Tamika Catchings (25)	Tamika Catchings (9)	Tied (2)	Bankers Life Fieldhouse; 8,333	11–12
24	July 22	@ Chicago	L 57–60	Catchings, Coleman (11)	Tamika Catchings (9)	Erlana Larkins (4)	Allstate Arena; 5,891	11–13
25	July 26	@ San Antonio	W 75–68	Lynetta Kizer (16)	Erlana Larkins (8)	Layshia Clarendon (5)	AT&T Center; 7,649	12–13
26	July 28	@ Los Angeles	L 73–77	Tamika Catchings (16)	Erlana Larkins (10)	Coleman, January (4)	STAPLES Center; 6,413	12–14
27	July 31	@ Seattle	W 76–67	Catchings, Coleman (16)	Tamika Catchings (6)	Tamika Catchings (4)	KeyArena; 6,179	13–14

August : 3–4 (Home: 2–2; Road: 1–2)

Game	Date	Team	Score	High points	High rebounds	High assists	Location Attendance	Record
28	August 2	@ Phoenix	L 69–79	Shavonte Zellous (14)	Erlana Larkins (13)	Shavonte Zellous (4)	US Airways Center; 9,239	13–15
29	August 5	Minnesota	L 64–66	Karima Christmas (15)	Erlana Larkins (11)	Briann January (5)	Bankers Life Fieldhouse; 6,556	13–16
30	August 8	Washington	L 61–74	Shavonte Zellous (13)	Erlana Larkins (8)	Tied (2)	Bankers Life Fieldhouse; 7,089	13–17
31	August 10	@ New York	W 90–76	Tamika Catchings (29)	Christmas, Larkins (6)	Briann January (5)	Madison Square Garden; 8,482	14–17
32	August 14	New York	W 76–63	Briann January (16)	Catchings, Larkins (9)	Erlana Larkins (3)	Bakers Life Fieldhouse; 8,030	15–17
33	August 16	Chicago	W 71–67	Tamika Catchings (25)	Tamika Catchings (9)	Briann January (7)	Bakers Life Fieldhouse; 10,625	16–17
34	August 17	@ New York	L 61–73	Maggie Lucas (17)	Kizer, Thomas (8)	Maggie Lucas (4)	Madison Square Garden; 9,432	16–18

2014 season schedule

=== Playoffs ===
2014 playoff game log
Conference Semi-Finals vs. Washington Mystics
Won Series: 2–0

Game	Date	Team	Score	High points	High rebounds	High assists	Location Attendance	Series
1	August 21	Washington	W 78–73	Tamika Catchings (22)	Erlana Larkins (11)	Tied (2)	Bankers Life Fieldhouse; 5,576	1–0
2	August 23	@ Washington	W 81–76	Tamika Catchings (26)	Tied (11)	Briann January (7)	Capital One Arena; 6,124	2–0

Conference Finals vs. Chicago Sky
Lost Series: 1–2

Game	Date	Team	Score	High points	High rebounds	High assists	Location Attendance	Series
1	August 30	Chicago	W 77–70	Briann January (19)	Erlana Larkins (8)	Tamika Catchings (4)	Bankers Life Fieldhouse; 7,557	1–0
2	September 1	@ Chicago	L 84–86 (OT2)	Shavonte Zellous (20)	Tamika Catchings (14)	Briann January (6)	Allstate Arena; 6,019	1–1
3	September 3	Chicago	L 62–75	Shavonte Zellous (16)	Erlana Larkins (11)	Tied (3)	Bankers Life Fieldhouse; 7,705	1–2

2014 playoff schedule

== Standings ==
#	Eastern Conference					
#	Team	W	L	PCT	GB	GP
1	y- Atlanta Dream	19	15	.559	-	34
2	x- Indiana Fever	16	18	.471	3.0	34
3	x-Washington Mystics	16	18	.471	3.0	34
4	x-Chicago Sky	15	19	.441	4.0	34
5	e-New York Liberty	15	19	.441	4.0	34
6	e-Connecticut Sun	13	21	.382	6.0	34

== Bracket ==
Conference Semi-finals: Best-of-3
E1	Atlanta	77	**92**	80
E4	**Chicago**	**80**	83	**81**
Eastern Conference
E2	**Indiana**	**78**	**81**	—
E3	Washington	73	76	—
W1	**Phoenix**	**75**	**93**	—
W4	Los Angeles	72	68	—
Western Conference
W2	**Minnesota**	**88**	**94**	—
W3	San Antonio	84	89	—

Conference Finals: Best-of-3
E4	**Chicago**	70	**86**	**75**
E2	Indiana	**77**	84	62
W1	**Phoenix**	**85**	77	**96**
W2	Minnesota	71	**82**	78

WNBA Finals: Best-of-5
E4	Chicago	62	68	82	—	—
W1	**Phoenix**	**83**	**97**	**87**	—	—

- **Bold** – Series winner
- Italics – Team with home-court advantage

== Statistics ==
Legend
GP	Games played	GS	Games started	MPG	Minutes per game	RPG	Rebounds per game
APG	Assists per game	SPG	Steals per game	BPG	Blocks per game	PPG	Points per game
FG%	Field-goal percentage	3P%	3-point field-goal percentage	FT%	Free-throw percentage	TO	Turnovers per game
PF	Fouls per game		Team leader		League leader

=== Regular season ===
Player	GP	GS	MPG	FG%	3P%	FT%	RPG	APG	SPG	BPG	TO	PF	PPG
Shavonte Zellous	34	33	27.4	.411	.305	.784	2.8	2.1	0.7	0.5	1.6	2.9	11.0
Marissa Coleman	34	32	24.0	.391	.381	.817	3.3	1.1	0.8	0.3	1.2	2.0	8.9
Karima Christmas	34	3	21.6	.343	.386	.755	3.6	0.9	0.9	0.3	0.7	2.1	6.9
Natasha Howard	34	15	16.9	.443	.000	.594	3.1	0.6	0.8	0.7	1.5	2.6	7.0
Erlana Larkins	33	33	31.6	.599	—	.716	9.2	2.5	1.9	0.8	2.2	3.2	9.7
Briann January	31	31	28.9	.387	.383	.880	1.6	3.7	1.2	0.3	2.3	2.4	10.3
Lynetta Kizer	31	1	9.0	.431	—	.619	2.4	0.1	0.3	0.3	0.8	1.8	3.8
Maggie Lucas	30	0	10.3	.333	.308	.957	0.9	0.7	0.3	0.2	0.4	1.2	3.7
Layshia Clarendon	29	3	13.7	.402	.316	.708	1.4	1.2	0.4	0.0	1.0	1.1	4.2
Sydney Carter	23	0	12.5	.288	.167	.742	0.9	1.3	0.3	0.1	1.4	0.9	3.2
Krystal Thomas ^{≠}	21	3	8.4	.545	—	.429	2.2	0.4	0.2	0.7	0.6	1.4	2.0
Tamika Catchings	16	16	26.9	.446	.368	.790	6.4	1.9	1.7	0.8	2.1	1.9	16.1
Jasmine Hassell ^{‡}	2	0	10.5	.600	—	—	0.0	0.5	1.5	0.0	1.0	2.5	3.0

^{‡}Waived/Released during the season
^{†}Traded during the season
^{≠}Acquired during the season

=== Playoffs ===
Player	GP	GS	MPG	FG%	3P%	FT%	RPG	APG	SPG	BPG	TO	PF	PPG
Shavonte Zellous	5	5	35.6	.389	.292	.750	3.4	1.0	0.4	0.8	0.6	3.4	14.4
Briann January	5	5	35.4	.322	.353	.833	2.8	4.2	1.2	0.8	2.0	2.4	12.8
Erlana Larkins	5	5	35.2	.531	.000	.733	10.4	1.8	1.2	0.6	1.4	3.8	9.0
Tamika Catchings	5	5	34.0	.311	.111	.900	9.2	3.2	2.6	0.6	2.0	2.0	16.6
Marissa Coleman	5	5	23.0	.410	.333	.500	3.2	0.0	1.0	0.0	1.0	2.4	8.2
Karima Christmas	5	0	25.0	.333	.333	.824	4.6	1.6	0.4	0.4	0.6	1.8	7.4
Layshia Clarendon	5	0	7.4	.231	.000	—	1.2	0.6	0.2	0.0	0.8	0.8	1.2
Maggie Lucas	5	0	7.2	.385	.429	—	0.2	0.0	0.0	0.4	0.2	1.8	2.6
Lynetta Kizer	5	0	6.0	.429	—	.750	1.2	0.6	0.2	0.4	0.0	1.4	3.0
Natasha Howard	4	0	3.8	.167	—	1.000	1.0	0.0	0.0	0.0	0.5	0.3	1.0
Krystal Thomas	2	0	6.0	.500	—	.000	1.5	0.0	0.0	0.0	0.0	2.0	1.0
Sydney Carter	1	0	5.0	.000	—	—	1.0	0.0	0.0	0.0	0.0	1.0	0.0

== Awards and honors ==
Recipient	Award	Date awarded	Ref.
Tamika Catchings	WNBA All-Star Starter	July 8	
Tamika Catchings	Eastern Conference Player of the Week	July 18	
Tamika Catchings	Eastern Conference Player of the Month – August	August 20	
Tamika Catchings	WNBA All-Defensive Second Team	August 22	
Lin Dunn	Women's Basketball Hall of Fame Class of 2014 Inductee	June 14	
Briann January	Eastern Conference Player of the Week	June 1	
Briann January	WNBA All-Star Reserve	July 16	
Briann January	WNBA All-Defensive First Team	August 22	
