= Jasmine Hassell =

American basketball player (born 1991)

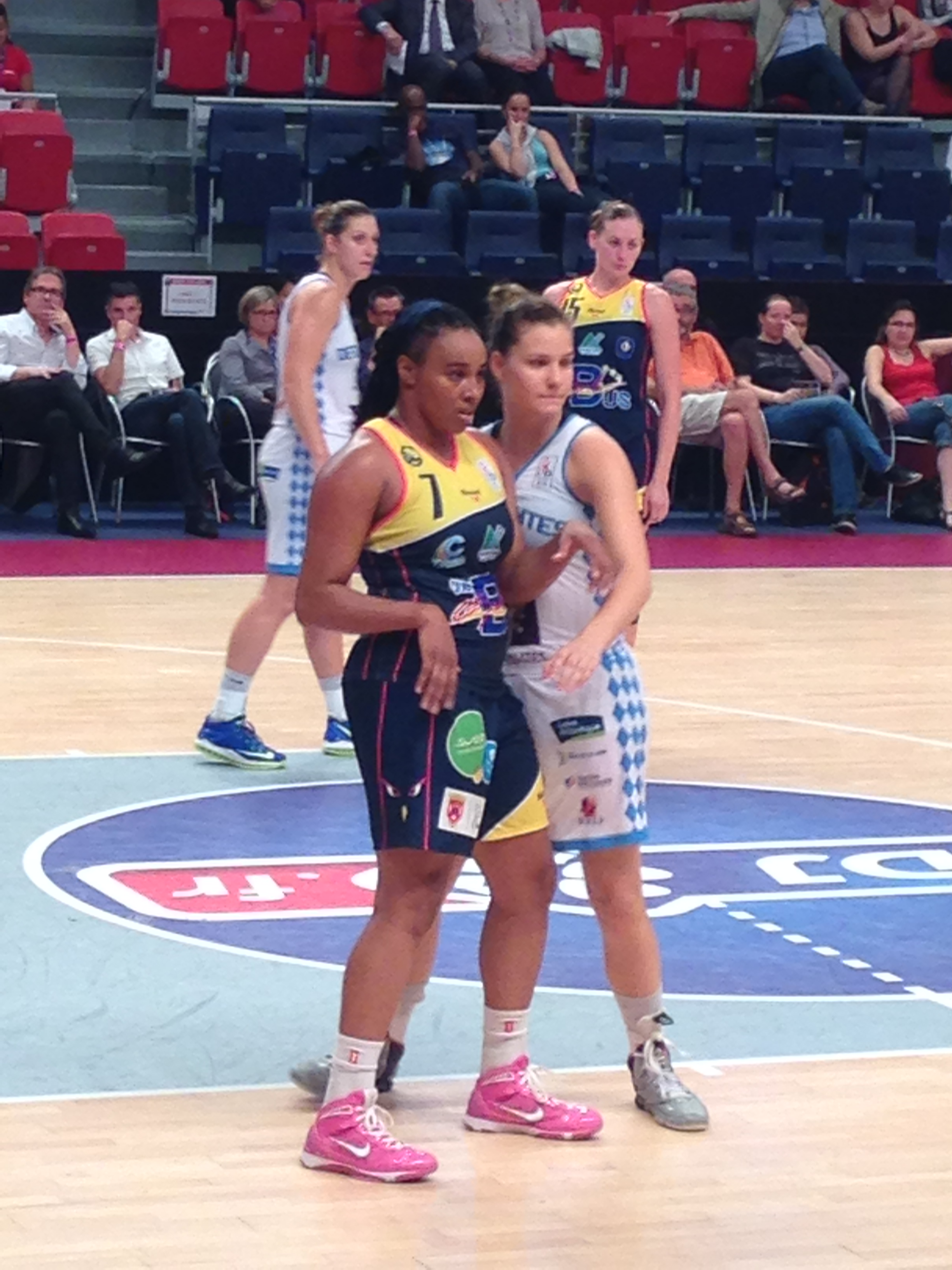
- Jasmine Hassel in front of Katia Clanet

Personal information
- Born: April 9, 1991 (age 35)
- Listed height: 6 ft 2 in (1.88 m)
- Listed weight: 216 lb (98 kg)

Career information
- High school: Wilson Central (Lebanon, Tennessee)
- College: Georgia (2009–2013)
- WNBA draft: 2013: 2nd round, 21st overall pick
- Drafted by: Indiana Fever
- Playing career: 2013–present
- Position: Forward

Career history
- 2013: Indiana Fever
- 2013: Seattle Storm
- 2014: Indiana Fever

Career highlights
- First-team All-SEC (2013); SEC All-Freshman Team (2010); McDonald's All-American (2009); 2× Class AAA Tennessee Miss Basketball (2008, 2009)
- Stats at WNBA.com
- Stats at Basketball Reference

Jasmine Hassell (born April 9, 1991) is an American professional basketball player who last played for the Indiana Fever of the WNBA. She played college basketball at the University of Georgia. Hassell is a Signature athlete of Hoops Mechanic basketball training and is under contract to play in Israel in 2015/2016.

== Career statistics ==
=== College career statistics ===
Legend
GP	Games played	GS	Games started	MPG	Minutes per game
FG%	Field goal percentage	3P%	3-point field goal percentage	FT%	Free throw percentage
RPG	Rebounds per game	APG	Assists per game	SPG	Steals per game
BPG	Blocks per game	PPG	Points per game	**Bold**	Career high

Year	Team	GP	Points	FG%	3P%	FT%	RPG	APG	SPG	BPG	PPG
2009–10	Georgia	34	211	52.2	–	63.2	2.8	0.2	0.2	0.3	6.2
2010–11	Georgia	34	327	51.6	–	63.3	4.5	0.0	0.5	0.4	9.6
2011–12	Georgia	31	402	**54.3**	–	62.2	5.7	0.5	0.6	0.3	**13.0**
2012–13	Georgia	**35**	**444**	53.1	–	**65.6**	**6.2**	**0.5**	**0.9**	**0.4**	12.7
Career	Georgia	134	1384	52.9	0.0	63.7	4.8	0.3	0.6	0.3	10.3

=== WNBA career statistics ===
Legend
GP	Games played	GS	Games started	MPG	Minutes per game	RPG	Rebounds per game
APG	Assists per game	SPG	Steals per game	BPG	Blocks per game	PPG	Points per game
TO	Turnovers per game	FG%	Field-goal percentage	3P%	3-point field-goal percentage	FT%	Free-throw percentage
**Bold**	Career best	°	League leader

==== Regular season ====
Year	Team	GP	GS	MPG	FG%	3P%	FT%	RPG	APG	SPG	BPG	TO	PPG
2013	Indiana	**18**	0	8.5	26.7	0.0	**47.1**	**1.1**	0.4	0.2	0.1	0.4	1.8
2013	Seattle	4	0	2.3	50.0	0.0	0.0	0.0	0.0	0.0	**0.3**	**0.0**	0.5
2014	Indiana	2	0	**10.5**	**60.0**	0.0	0.0	0.0	**0.5**	**1.5**	0.0	1.0	**3.0**
Career	2 years, 2 teams	24	0	7.6	30.8	0.0	47.1	0.8	0.4	0.3	0.0	0.4	1.7

== See also ==
- Georgia Lady Bulldogs basketball
