= Tory Humphrey =

American football player (born 1983)

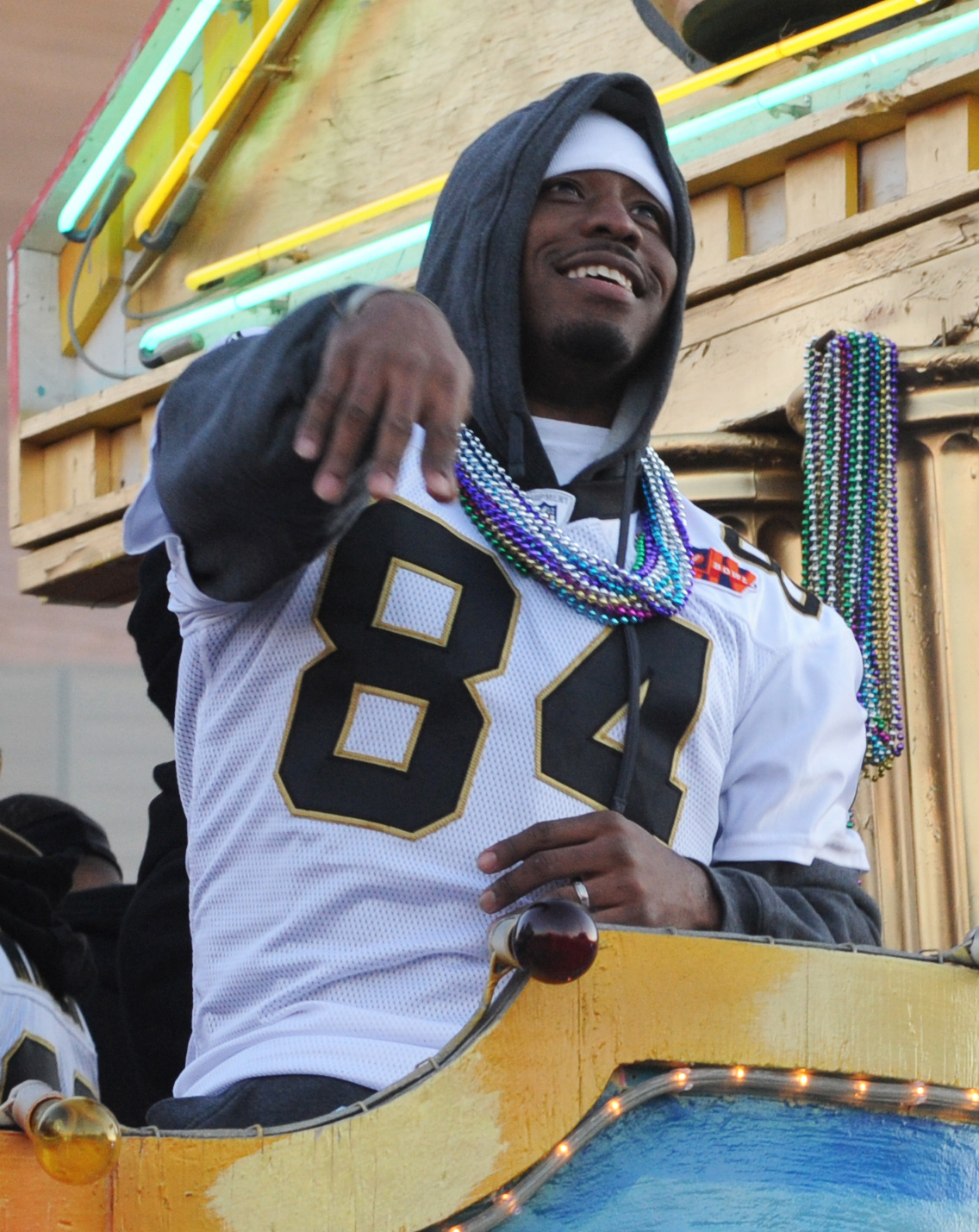
- Humphrey at the Saints victory parade in 2010

No. 49, 84, 88
- Position: Tight end

Personal information
- Born: January 20, 1983 (age 43); Saginaw, Michigan, U.S.
- Listed height: 6 ft 2 in (1.88 m)
- Listed weight: 255 lb (116 kg)

Career information
- High school: Saginaw
- College: Central Michigan (2001–2004)
- NFL draft: 2005: undrafted

Career history
- Indianapolis Colts (2005)*; Green Bay Packers (2005–2008); → Amsterdam Admirals (2006); New Orleans Saints (2009–2011); Oakland Raiders (2012)*
- * Offseason or practice squad member only

Awards and highlights
- Super Bowl champion (XLIV); Freshman All-American (2001)

Career NFL statistics
- Receptions: 13
- Receiving yards: 181
- Stats at Pro Football Reference

Tory Terrell Humphrey (born January 20, 1983) is an American former professional football player who was a tight end in the National Football League (NFL). He played college football for the Central Michigan Chippewas. Humphrey was signed by the Indianapolis Colts as an undrafted free agent in 2005, and signed to the Green Bay Packers in August of 2005. He was also a member of the Amsterdam Admirals, New Orleans Saints, and Oakland Raiders.

== Professional career ==
Pre-draft measurables
Height	Weight	40-yard dash	20-yard shuttle	Vertical jump	Broad jump	Bench press
6 ft 3 1/4 in (1.91 m)	255 lb (116 kg)	4.50 s	3.95 s	38.0 in (0.97 m)	10 ft 5 in (3.18 m)	21 reps
All values from Pro Day

=== Indianapolis Colts ===
After going undrafted in the 2005 NFL draft, Humphrey signed with the Indianapolis Colts as an undrafted free agent on April 29. He was waived by the team on June 9.

=== Green Bay Packers ===
Humphrey signed his one-year tender offer as an exclusive-rights free agent on March 19, 2008. As a restricted free agent in the 2009 offseason, he re-signed with the Packers on April 6.

Humphrey suffered a broken arm during training camp on August 7, 2009 after being hit by safety Aaron Rouse. Humphrey underwent successful surgery following the injury, but was ruled out by head coach Mike McCarthy for the rest of the 2009 season. He was waived/injured on August 13 and subsequently reverted to injured reserve. He was released with an injury settlement on August 20.

=== New Orleans Saints ===
Humphrey signed with the New Orleans Saints on December 21, 2009. He was waived five days later on December 26 when the team promoted cornerback Greg Fassitt from the practice squad. Humphrey was re-signed on December 29 as the team waived safety Herana-Daze Jones. He caught one pass in the Saints' final regular season game, but was inactive for their playoff run that ended with their win in Super Bowl XLIV. He was released as a final cut in 2011, but re-signed with the Saints on October 26, 2011.

=== Oakland Raiders ===
Humphrey signed with the Oakland Raiders during their off-season training program on June 12, 2012.
