= Herana-Daze Jones =

American football player (born 1982)

No. 44, 43, 29
- Position: Safety

Personal information
- Born: April 15, 1982 (age 44); Louisville, Kentucky, U.S.
- Listed height: 5 ft 11 in (1.80 m)
- Listed weight: 206 lb (93 kg)

Career information
- High school: Iroquois (Louisville)
- College: Indiana
- NFL draft: 2005: undrafted

Career history
- Cincinnati Bengals (2005–2008); Denver Broncos (2008); New England Patriots (2009)*; New Orleans Saints (2009); Arizona Cardinals (2010)*; Florida Tuskers (2010); Virginia Destroyers (2011)
- * Offseason or practice squad member only

Awards and highlights
- Second-team All-Big Ten (2004)

Career NFL statistics
- Total tackles: 47
- Forced fumbles: 1
- Stats at Pro Football Reference

Herana-Daze Lavalle Jones (first name pronounced like 'Hernandez') (born April 15, 1982) is an American former professional football player who was a safety in the National Football League (NFL) and United Football League (UFL). He was signed by the Cincinnati Bengals as an undrafted free agent in 2005. He played college football for the Indiana Hoosiers.

Jones was also a member of the Denver Broncos, New England Patriots, New Orleans Saints and Arizona Cardinals.

== Early life ==
Jones attended Iroquois High School in Louisville, Kentucky where, as a senior, he scored 26 touchdowns and broke the state record with a 220 yards per game rushing average, previously held by Shaun Alexander. Jones also lettered in track and basketball.

== College career ==
Jones played college football for the Indiana Hoosiers, where he was a four-year starter. He currently ranks 4th All-time in tackles at Indiana with 342. As a senior, he led the team in tackles with 110, making 2nd team all big ten.

== Professional career ==
=== Cincinnati Bengals ===
Jones was signed by the Cincinnati Bengals as a college free agent on April 28, 2005. After spending the 2005 season on the Bengals' practice squad, he made the 53-man roster in 2006. Jones led the Bengals in special teams tackles in both 2006 and 2007. He was placed on injured reserve on October 17, 2008, and released from injured reserve with an injury settlement on November 4, 2008.

=== Denver Broncos ===
Jones signed with the Denver Broncos on December 3, 2008. He was waived on December 10 when the team re-signed tight end Jeb Putzier. He was re-signed by the Broncos on December 16 when running back Cory Boyd was waived. He was released again on June 18, 2009.

=== New England Patriots ===
Jones signed with the New England Patriots on July 28, 2009. He was released by the Patriots during final cuts on September 5.

=== New Orleans Saints ===
Jones signed with the New Orleans Saints on December 22, 2009, when the team waived cornerback Marcus McCauley. He was waived on December 29 as the team re-signed tight end Tory Humphrey.

=== Arizona Cardinals ===
Jones signed a future contract with the Arizona Cardinals on January 21, 2010.
