= Iroquois High School =

Location
- 4615 Taylor Boulevard; Louisville, Jefferson, Kentucky 40215; United States; 38.1733334°N 85.78134°W

Information
- Opened: 1965
- Status: Open
- School district: Jefferson County Public Schools
- Principal: Toetta Taul
- Teaching staff: 76.34 (FTE)
- Grades: 9–12
- Enrollment: 1,146 (2023–2024)
- Student to teacher ratio: 15.01
- Colors: Navy, Columbia blue and white
- Nickname: Raiders and Lady Raiders
- Website: www.jefferson.kyschools.us/schools/profiles/iroquois

Iroquois High School is a high school located in southwestern Louisville, Kentucky, United States near Iroquois Park, in the Beechmont neighborhood (nestled between two portions of the Iroquois neighborhood). It is part of the Jefferson County Public Schools. As of the 2014–15 school year, there were 1,205 students at the school.

== History ==
In August 1965, due to a demand for a new high school in the area of the Iroquois neighborhood, Gottschalk Junior High School was converted into Iroquois High.

== Programs ==
The school provides programs for Construction Technology and U.S. Navy ROTC. In 2014, the school began to host the district's first International Academy, a satellite program for the Newcomer Academy at The Academy @ Shawnee that serves English language learners in grades 6–10.

== Athletics ==
The school athletic complex has the gymnasium, the Iroquois Athletic Center, which seats a maximum of 2,000 people. Also, Fryrear Field is a stadium seats a maximum of 4,000 people. The school has athletic programs for baseball, basketball, cross country, football, golf, soccer, fast pitch softball, tennis, track, volleyball, wrestling and cheerleading.

== Notable alumni and faculty ==
- Brad H. Cox, racehorse trainer
- Scott Davenport, current head men's basketball coach at nearby Bellarmine University
- Ed Hamilton (faculty), sculptor
- Kym Hampton, WNBA player
- Herana-Daze Jones, American football player
- A'dia Mathies, WNBA player
- Bryson Tiller, singer, songwriter and rapper

== See also ==
- Public schools in Louisville, Kentucky
