= Maggie Lucas =

American basketball player and coach (born 1991)

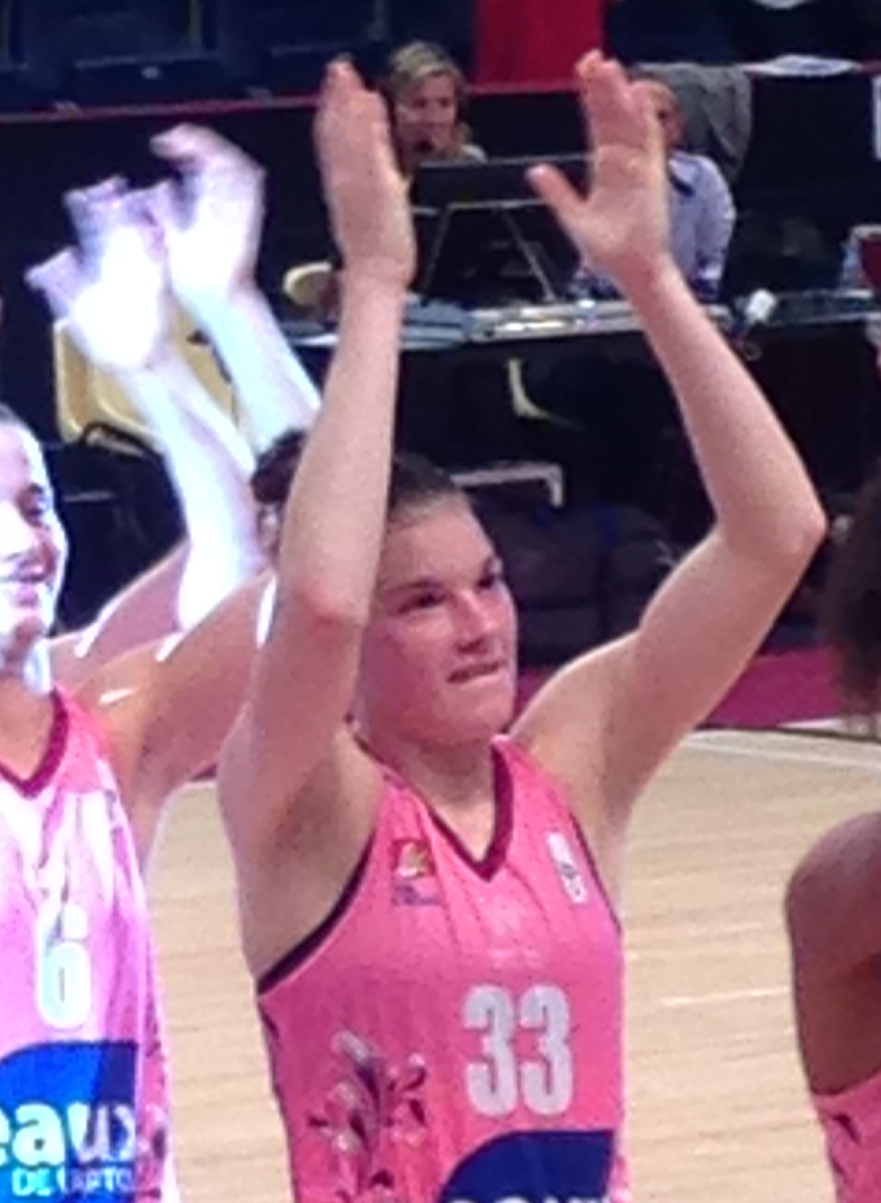

Bowling Green Falcons
- Title: Assistant coach
- League: Mid-American Conference

Personal information
- Born: November 29, 1991 (age 34) Philadelphia, Pennsylvania, U.S.
- Listed height: 5 ft 10 in (1.78 m)
- Listed weight: 158 lb (72 kg)

Career information
- High school: Germantown Academy (Fort Washington, Pennsylvania)
- College: Penn State (2010–2014)
- WNBA draft: 2014: 2nd round, 21st overall pick
- Drafted by: Phoenix Mercury
- Playing career: 2014–2022
- Position: Shooting guard
- Number: 8, 33
- Coaching career: 2022–present

Career history

Playing
- 2014-2015: Arras Pays d’Artois
- 2014–2016: Indiana Fever
- 2018: Atlanta Dream
- 2018: Dallas Wings
- 2018-2019: Landerneau Bretagne Basket
- 2019-2020: Tianjin Ronggang
- 2020-2021: Luleå Basket
- 2021-2022: Dinamo Sassari

Coaching
- 2022–2023: Penn State (assistant)
- 2023–present: Bowling Green (assistant)

Career highlights
- As player: Third-team All-American – AP (2014); Second-team All-American – AP (2013); 2× All-American – USBWA (2013, 2014); Big Ten Co-Player of the Year (2014); Big Ten Player of the Year (2013); 3× First-team All-Big Ten (2012–2014); Big Ten Freshman of the Year (2011); Big Ten Sixth Player of the Year (2011); Big Ten All-Freshman Team (2011); McDonald's All-American (2010)
- Stats at WNBA.com
- Stats at Basketball Reference

Margaret Taylor Lucas (born November 29, 1991) is an American assistant coach for the Bowling Green Falcons women's basketball team. As a player, Lucas played for three Women's National Basketball Association (WNBA) teams over four seasons.

== High school ==
Lucas attended Germantown Academy in Fort Washington, Pennsylvania. She averaged 23.0 points, 4.5. assists and 3.8 steals per game as she led Germantown Academy to its second-straight Independent Schools State title. Lucas was selected and played in the McDonald's All-American game where they also participated and won the All-America three-point contest.

== College career ==
In Lucas's senior year, she led the Penn State Lady Lions basketball in scoring with 21.0 points per game. She also registered 4.2 rebounds and 2.2 assists. The Lady Lions finished that season with a 24-8 overall record. She scored 2,510 total career points, second in school history. She recorded 365 3-pointers, the 12th highest career total in NCAA history.

== Penn State statistics ==
Legend
GP	Games played	GS	Games started	MPG	Minutes per game
FG%	Field goal percentage	3P%	3-point field goal percentage	FT%	Free throw percentage
RPG	Rebounds per game	APG	Assists per game	SPG	Steals per game
BPG	Blocks per game	PPG	Points per game	**Bold**	Career high

Year	Team	GP	Points	FG%	3P%	FT%	RPG	APG	SPG	BPG	PPG
2010–11	Penn State	**35**	552	42.5	42.6	87.0	3.1	1.6	1.6	0.2	15.8
2011–12	Penn State	33	642	43.0	41.0	88.6	**4.7**	**2.8**	1.4	0.2	19.5
2012–13	Penn State	32	644	**44.1**	**46.2**	90.0	4.5	2.2	**2.3**	**0.3**	20.1
2013–14	Penn State	32	**672**	39.1	35.6	**94.9**	4.2	2.2	1.9	0.1	**21.0**
Career		132	2510	42.1	41.5	90.7	4.1	2.2	1.8	0.2	19.0

== Professional career ==
Lucas was drafted by Phoenix Mercury in the second round of the 2014 WNBA draft. Her contract was exchanged on May 12, 2014 to the Indiana Fever where she spent the next three seasons. In 2015, Lucas had a career high 23 points on 7-of-12 shooting with five three pointers in a victory against the New York Liberty. Lucas' 2016 season ended prematurely due to a torn ligament in her knee. She missed the 2017 WNBA season due to a relapse in her right knee. In 2018, Lucas would sign with the Atlanta Dream where she played in seven games. Lucas finished the regular season and playoffs with the Dallas Wings.

== WNBA career statistics ==
Legend
GP	Games played	GS	Games started	MPG	Minutes per game	RPG	Rebounds per game
APG	Assists per game	SPG	Steals per game	BPG	Blocks per game	PPG	Points per game
TO	Turnovers per game	FG%	Field-goal percentage	3P%	3-point field-goal percentage	FT%	Free-throw percentage
**Bold**	Career best	°	League leader

=== Regular season ===
Year	Team	GP	GS	MPG	FG%	3P%	FT%	RPG	APG	SPG	BPG	TO	PPG
2014	Indiana	**30**	0	10.3	.333	.308	.957	0.9	0.7	0.3	**0.2**	0.4	3.7
2015	Indiana	**30**	0	15.0	.372	**.373**	.838	0.8	**0.9**	0.4	0.1	0.6	5.7
2016	Indiana	4	0	13.8	**.524**	.200	**1.000**	**2.0**	0.8	0.5	0.0	**1.3**	**7.8**
2017	Indiana	Did Not Play (injury—knee)											
2018	Atlanta	7	0	5.1	.091	.100	.000	0.4	0.0	0.1	0.0	0.7	0.4
2018	Dallas	1	0	**20.0**	.000	.000	.000	0.0	0.0	**2.0**	0.0	1.0	0.0
Career	4 years, 3 teams	72	0	12.1	.352	.316	.896	0.9	0.7	0.3	0.1	0.6	4.4

=== Playoffs ===
Year	Team	GP	GS	MPG	FG%	3P%	FT%	RPG	APG	SPG	BPG	TO	PPG
2014	Indiana	**5**	0	7.2	.385	.429	.000	**0.2**	0.0	0.0	**0.4**	0.2	2.6
2015	Indiana	**5**	0	3.8	**.667**	**1.000**	**1.000**	0.0	0.0	0.0	0.0	0.4	1.2
2018	Dallas	1	0	**19.0**	.500	.500	.000	0.0	**1.0**	0.0	0.0	0.0	**7.0**
Career	3 years, 2 teams	11	0	6.7	.455	.500	1.000	0.1	0.1	0.0	0.2	0.3	2.4

== International ==
In the 2014-2015 season Lucas earned her first International experience playing for the Arras Pays d’Artois. Lucas led the team in points per game (18.2), minutes played (36.8), three pointers made (72) and free throw percentage (.930%).

For the 2018-2019 season, Lucas played for the Landerneau Bretagne Basket in the LFB. Lucas averaged 11.2 points per game over 25 games. Lucas also led the team with 45 three pointers and a .956% free throw percentage.

For the 2019-2020 season, Lucas played for the Tianjin Ronggang in the WCBA. On December 31, Lucas scored a career high 49 points and 12 three pointers against Sichuan. In 18 games, Lucas led the team with 27.3 points per game on .455% shooting.

On January 5, 2021, she joined Luleå Basket, playing in the SBL. Lucas led the team to an SBLDAM Championship and was the league's finals MVP. Lucas led the team with 19.5 points per game and was 73-for-168 (.435%) from three point range. In 2021-2022 Lucas played for the Dinamo Sassari where she was named All-Euro Cup first team in 2022. Over eight Euro Cup games, Lucas averaged 27.1 points per game and made 36 three pointers. In 28 regular season games, Lucas averaged 24.5 points per game while making over .400% from the field. Lucas was also 125-for-132 from the stripe, equaling .947% on the season.

== Coaching ==
In 2022, Lucas returned to Penn State where she was a Director of player Development. On July 14, she was promoted to an assistant coach.

In May 2023, Lucas was announced as an assistant coach for Bowling Green Falcons.
