= Karima Christmas-Kelly =

American basketball player (born 1989)

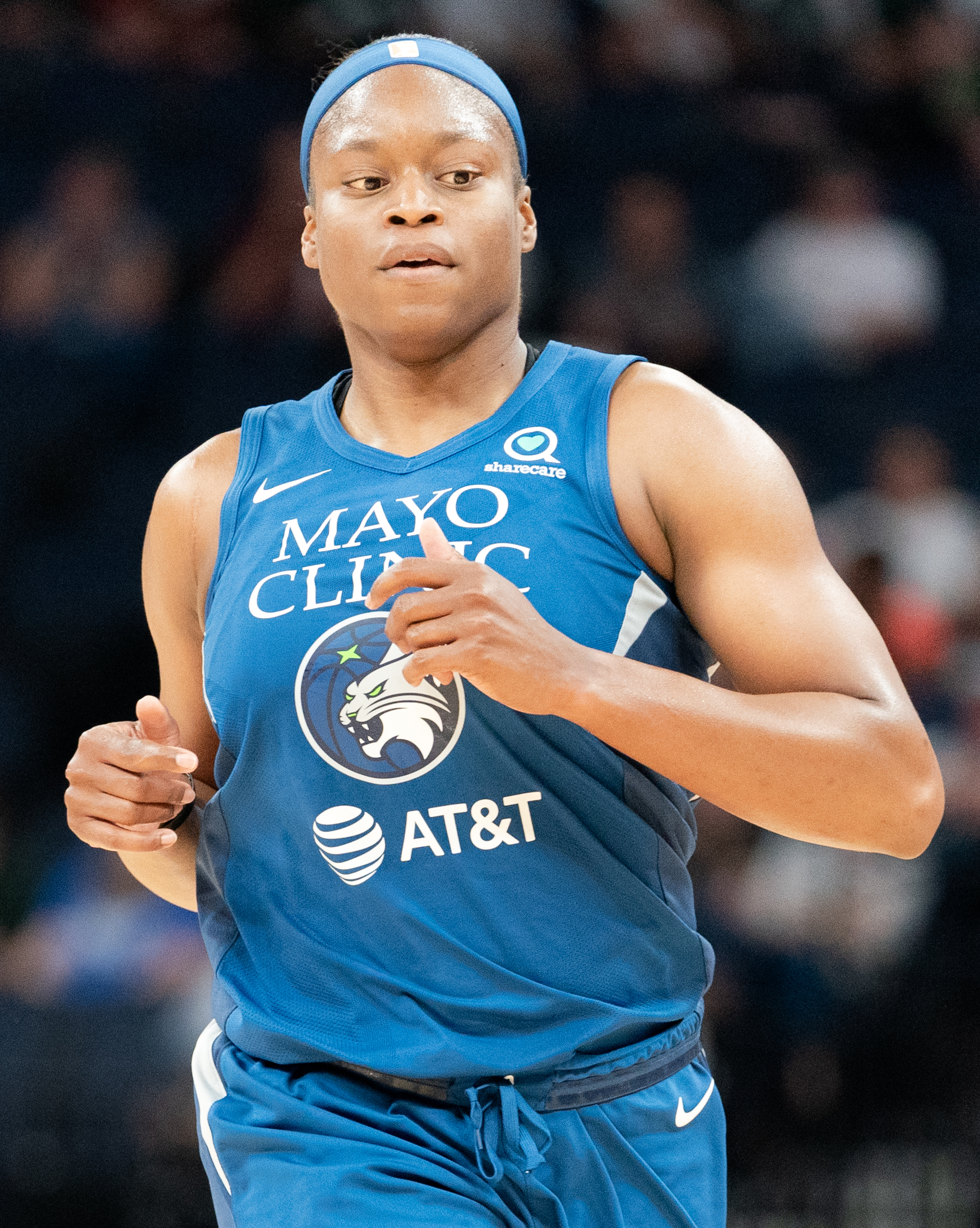
- Christmas-Kelly in 2019

Indiana Fever
- Position: Assistant coach
- League: WNBA

Personal information
- Born: September 11, 1989 (age 37) Long Beach, California, U.S.
- Listed height: 6 ft 0 in (1.83 m)
- Listed weight: 180 lb (82 kg)

Career information
- High school: Dobie (Houston, Texas)
- College: Duke (2007–2011)
- WNBA draft: 2011: 2nd round, 23rd overall pick
- Drafted by: Washington Mystics
- Playing career: 2011–present

Career history

Playing
- 2011: Washington Mystics
- 2011–2012: Tulsa Shock
- 2012–2014: Indiana Fever
- 2015–2018: Tulsa Shock / Dallas Wings
- 2016–2017: Guri KDB Life Winnus
- 2019–2020: Minnesota Lynx

Coaching
- 2023–present: Indiana Fever (Asst.)

Career highlights
- As player: WNBA champion (2012); As assistant coach: WNBA Commissioner's Cup Champion (2025)
- Stats at WNBA.com
- Stats at Basketball Reference

Karima Brittany Christmas-Kelly (born September 11, 1989) is an American basketball coach and former professional basketball player. Christmas-Kelly is currently an assistant coach for the Indiana Fever of the WNBA. She played college basketball at Duke.

== Duke statistics ==
Legend
GP	Games played	GS	Games started	MPG	Minutes per game
FG%	Field goal percentage	3P%	3-point field goal percentage	FT%	Free throw percentage
RPG	Rebounds per game	APG	Assists per game	SPG	Steals per game
BPG	Blocks per game	PPG	Points per game	**Bold**	Career high

Year	Team	GP	Points	FG%	3P%	FT%	RPG	APG	SPG	BPG	PPG
2007–08	Duke	30	123	**52.1**	–	59.0	2.6	0.5	0.8	0.2	4.1
2008–09	Duke	32	239	49.4	**45.9**	65.1	4.2	1.0	1.4	0.3	7.5
2009–10	Duke	**36**	**347**	43.1	28.6	**71.7**	5.3	1.5	**2.2**	**0.4**	**9.6**
2010–11	Duke	**36**	343	37.5	21.1	69.9	**6.3**	**1.7**	1.6	0.4	9.5
Career	Duke	134	1052	43.5	28.3	68.3	4.7	1.2	1.5	0.3	7.9

== WNBA ==
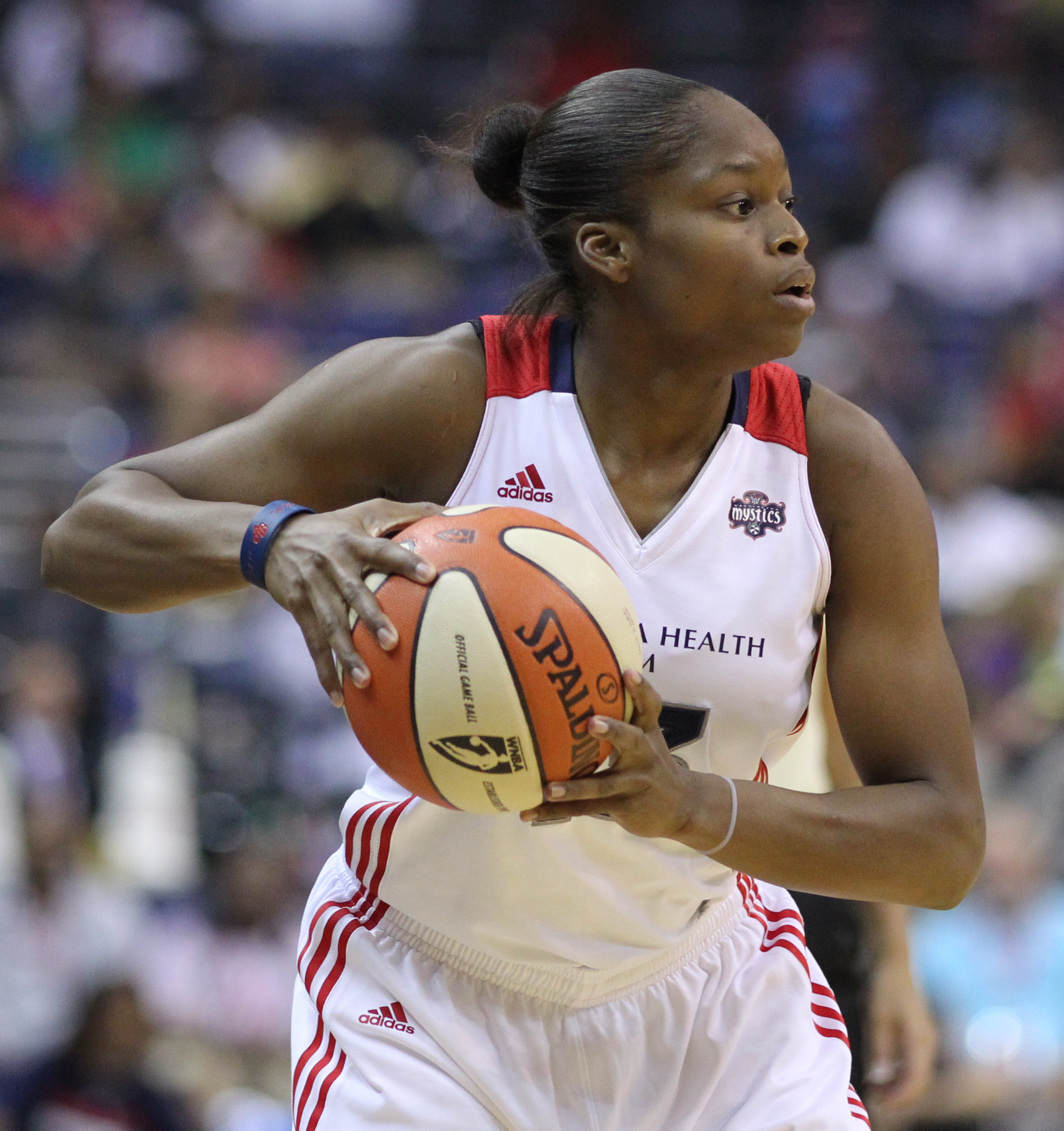
Christmas-Kelly playing for the Washington Mystics in 2011

Christmas-Kelly was selected the second round of the 2011 WNBA draft (23rd overall) by the Washington Mystics.

On February 5, 2015, Christmas signed with the Tulsa Shock, which she previously played from 2011 to 2012.

On February 1, 2019, Christmas-Kelly signed with the Minnesota Lynx. On July 30, 2020, Christmas-Kelly was waived by the Lynx after suffering a season-ending achilles injury.

== Personal life ==
Christmas-Kelly is married to Austin Kelly, who is also an Indiana Fever assistant coach. They have a son.

== WNBA career statistics ==
Legend
GP	Games played	GS	Games started	MPG	Minutes per game	RPG	Rebounds per game
APG	Assists per game	SPG	Steals per game	BPG	Blocks per game	PPG	Points per game
TO	Turnovers per game	FG%	Field-goal percentage	3P%	3-point field-goal percentage	FT%	Free-throw percentage
**Bold**	Career best	°	League leader

†	Denotes seasons in which Christmas-Kelly won a WNBA championship

=== Regular season ===
Year	Team	GP	GS	MPG	FG%	3P%	FT%	RPG	APG	SPG	BPG	TO	PPG
2011	Washington	14	0	10.1	.310	.217	.696	1.2	0.1	0.6	0.1	0.6	3.4
2011	Tulsa	17	0	9.8	.370	.235	.800	1.2	0.4	0.4	0.2	0.9	3.2
2012	Tulsa	14	6	11.5	.333	.313	.739	1.9	0.2	1.0	0.3	0.4	3.6
2012^{†}	Indiana	16	0	10.9	.314	.318	.500	2.3	0.8	0.8	0.3	0.5	2.9
2013	Indiana	**34**	28	26.9	.373	.300	.811	4.1	1.1	**1.9**	0.3	1.2	8.6
2014	Indiana	**34**	3	21.6	.343	.386	.755	3.6	0.9	0.9	0.3	0.7	6.9
2015	Tulsa	32	32	28.7	.396	.386	.782	5.0	1.7	1.1	0.3	1.2	10.6
2016	Dallas	**34**	**34**	**31.6**	.400	.317	.796	5.9	2.1	1.2	**0.7**	1.5	**12.4**
2017	Dallas	**34**	**34**	29.7	.380	.292	.851	4.2	**2.2**	1.2	0.2	1.6	10.4
2018	Dallas	6	6	27.8	**.448**	**.444**	.813	**5.5**	1.5	0.3	0.3	1.7	9.3
2019	Minnesota	6	0	12.0	.278	.273	.600	0.8	1.0	0.8	0.2	0.7	2.7
2020	Minnesota	2	0	12.5	.143	.000	**.875**	3.0	0.5	1.5	0.5	2.0	4.5
Career	10 years, 4 teams	243	143	22.9	.374	.321	.791	3.7	1.3	1.1	0.3	1.1	7.0

=== Playoffs ===
Year	Team	GP	GS	MPG	FG%	3P%	FT%	RPG	APG	SPG	BPG	TO	PPG
2012^{†}	Indiana	3	0	10.7	.250	.167	**1.000**	2.7	0.3	0.3	0.3	0.7	3.0
2013	Indiana	4	**4**	30.8	**.400**	.286	.625	**6.0**	2.3	1.0	0.5	3.5	**10.8**
2014	Indiana	**5**	0	25.0	.333	**.333**	.824	4.6	1.6	0.4	0.4	0.6	7.4
2015	Tulsa	2	2	32.5	.211	.000	.875	5.0	1.0	**1.5**	0.5	1.5	7.5
2017	Dallas	1	1	**34.0**	.222	.000	**1.000**	5.0	**3.0**	1.0	**1.0**	0.0	6.0
Career	5 years, 2 teams	15	7	25.3	.324	.214	.821	4.7	1.5	0.7	0.5	1.5	7.3
