= Sydney Carter (basketball) =

American basketball player (born 1990)

Personal information
- Born: November 18, 1990 (age 35) Dallas, Texas, U.S.
- Listed height: 5 ft 6 in (1.68 m)

Career information
- High school: DeSoto (DeSoto, Texas)
- College: Texas A&M (2008–2012)
- WNBA draft: 2012: 3rd round, 27th overall pick
- Drafted by: Chicago Sky
- Playing career: 2012–2015
- Position: Guard

Career history
- 2012: Chicago Sky
- 2013: Connecticut Sun
- 2014: Indiana Fever
- 2015: Atlanta Dream

Career highlights
- NCAA champion (2011); 2× Big 12 All-Defensive Team (2011, 2012); Big 12 All-Freshman Team (2009)
- Stats at WNBA.com
- Stats at Basketball Reference

Sydney Carter (born November 18, 1990) is a retired professional basketball player. She played college basketball at Texas A&M University, where she played along Sydney Colson and San Antonio Stars center Danielle Adams and helped the Aggies win the NCAA title during her junior year. She was an assistant coach in the 2021-2022 season at Texas A&M and is now the Director of Player Development for women’s basketball at The University of Texas.

== College career ==
Carter played four years of college basketball at Texas A&M University. She was a three-time team captain and defensive anchor for the A&M defense, which earned her a spot on the Big 12 All-Defensive Team in 2011 and 2012. Carter won her team's Miss Defense Award three times, in 2010, 2011 and 2012, as well as the Miss Aggie Award at the end of her senior season.

== WNBA career ==
Sydney Carter was selected in the third round of the 2012 WNBA draft (28th overall) by the Chicago Sky.
On March 18, 2013, Carter signed a training camp contract with the Atlanta Dream, but was cut before the start of the regular season.
On June 10, 2013, Carter signed with the Connecticut Sun.

== Overseas career ==
In the 2014 season, Carter began playing overseas in Latvia, where she became a three-time Latvian/Estonian Champion in 2014, 2016 and 2017, as well as an Eastern European League champ in 2016. She also had a short stint playing in Israel, in an overseas career spanning seven years.

In 2018, she would then suffer a meniscus tear that marked the end of her playing career.

== Coaching career ==
In July 2020, Carter was recruited into the coaching staff of the Texas A&M women's basketball team, as the video coordinator, by head coach Gary Blair.

In April 2022, she was hired for the position of director of player development for the University of Texas women's basketball team.

== Career statistics ==
Legend
GP	Games played	GS	Games started	MPG	Minutes per game	RPG	Rebounds per game
APG	Assists per game	SPG	Steals per game	BPG	Blocks per game	PPG	Points per game
TO	Turnovers per game	FG%	Field-goal percentage	3P%	3-point field-goal percentage	FT%	Free-throw percentage
**Bold**	Career best	°	League leader

*	Denotes season(s) in which Carter won an NCAA Championship

=== WNBA ===
==== Regular season ====
WNBA regular season statistics
Year	Team	GP	GS	MPG	FG%	3P%	FT%	RPG	APG	SPG	BPG	TO	PPG
2012	Chicago	1	0	9.0	33.3	0.0	—	0.0	0.0	1.0	0.0	**1.0**	4.0
2013	Connecticut	15	1	**17.3**	**35.0**	**21.1**	**80.0**	**1.5**	**1.8**	**0.5**	**0.3**	1.7	**4.1**
2014	Indiana	23	0	12.5	28.8	16.7	74.2	0.9	1.3	0.3	0.1	1.4	3.2
2015	Atlanta	**26**	**7**	11.3	20.8	16.7	**80.0**	0.9	1.2	0.3	0.1	0.6	2.0
**Career**	4 year, 4 teams	65	8	13.1	28.0	17.3	77.5	1.0	1.3	0.4	0.1	1.1	2.9

==== Playoffs ====
WNBA playoff statistics
Year	Team	GP	GS	MPG	FG%	3P%	FT%	RPG	APG	SPG	BPG	TO	PPG
2014	Indiana	1	0	5.0	0.0	—	—	1.0	0.0	0.0	0.0	0.0	0.0
**Career**	1 year, 1 team	1	0	5.0	0.0	—	—	1.0	0.0	0.0	0.0	0.0	0.0

=== College ===
NCAA statistics
Year	Team	GP	Points	FG%	3P%	FT%	RPG	APG	SPG	BPG	PPG
2008-09	Texas A&M	34	147	41.2%	37.3%	79.5%	0.9	1.6	1.1	0.1	4.3
2009-10	Texas A&M	34	260	33.9%	35.3%	77.8%	2.9	3.4	1.2	0.4	7.6
2010-11 *	Texas A&M	**38**	**398**	**38.4%**	**38.9%**	**86.3%**	3.3	3.0	1.6	**0.5**	10.5
2011-12	Texas A&M	34	372	31.2%	21.6%	81.9%	**3.3**	**3.1**	**1.9**	0.4	**10.9**
**Career**		140	1177	35.0%	32.5%	82.0%	2.6	2.8	1.5	0.4	8.4
