= Marcus McCauley =

American football player (born 1983)

No. 31, 21, 32, 25
- Position: Cornerback

Personal information
- Born: September 3, 1983 (age 43); Sacramento, California, U.S.
- Listed height: 6 ft 1 in (1.85 m)
- Listed weight: 203 lb (92 kg)

Career information
- High school: Cordova (Rancho Cordova, California)
- College: Fresno State
- NFL draft: 2007: 3rd round, 72nd overall pick

Career history
- Minnesota Vikings (2007–2008); Detroit Lions (2009); Tampa Bay Buccaneers (2009); New Orleans Saints (2009); Washington Redskins (2009); Indianapolis Colts (2010); Sacramento Mountain Lions (2010)

Awards and highlights
- Second-team All-WAC (2005)

Career NFL statistics
- Total tackles: 70
- Pass deflections: 8
- Stats at Pro Football Reference

Marcus Xavier McCauley Jr. (born September 3, 1983) is an American former professional football player who was a cornerback in the National Football League (NFL). He was selected by the Minnesota Vikings in the third round of the 2007 NFL draft. He played college football for the Fresno State Bulldogs.

McCauley was also a member of the Detroit Lions, Tampa Bay Buccaneers, New Orleans Saints, Washington Redskins, Indianapolis Colts and Sacramento Mountain Lions.

== College career ==
McCauley played his college football for the Fresno State Bulldogs. During his career he played in 51 games starting 32 and was Named 2nd-Team All-Western Athletic Conference during his junior season.

== Professional career ==
=== Minnesota Vikings ===
McCauley was selected by the Minnesota Vikings in the third round of the 2007 NFL draft. During his rookie season, he started nine games, recording 64 tackles. He was waived during final cuts on September 5, 2009.

=== Detroit Lions ===
McCauley was claimed off waivers by the Detroit Lions on September 6, 2009. He was waived on September 29.

=== Tampa Bay Buccaneers ===
McCauley was signed by the Tampa Bay Buccaneers on October 20. He was waived on November 3.

=== New Orleans Saints ===
McCauley was signed by the New Orleans Saints on December 8. He was waived on December 22 when the team signed safety Herana-Daze Jones.

=== Washington Redskins ===
McCauley was signed by the Washington Redskins on December 30, 2009. He was released on June 9, 2010.

=== Sacramento Mountain Lions ===
McCauley was signed by the Sacramento Mountain Lions of the United Football League on October 18, 2010.
