= Greg Fassitt =

American football player (born 1985)

No. 38
- Position: Cornerback

Personal information
- Born: April 4, 1985 (age 41); New Orleans, Louisiana, U.S.
- Listed height: 5 ft 11 in (1.80 m)
- Listed weight: 186 lb (84 kg)

Career information
- College: Grambling
- NFL draft: 2007: undrafted

Career history
- Chicago Bears (2007)*; New Orleans Saints (2008); Tampa Bay Buccaneers (2008–2009)*; Florida Tuskers (2009)*; New Orleans Saints (2009); Calgary Stampeders (2011)
- * Offseason or practice squad member only

Awards and highlights
- Super Bowl champion (XLIV)
- Stats at Pro Football Reference

Greg Fassitt (born April 4, 1985) is an American former professional football cornerback. He was signed by the Chicago Bears as an undrafted free agent in 2007. He played college football at Grambling.

Fassitt was also a member of the New Orleans Saints, Tampa Bay Buccaneers, Florida Tuskers, and Calgary Stampeders.

== College career ==
Fassitt played collegiately at Grambling State. He played in 32 games, recording 110 tackles, 7 interceptions, and 31 passes defensed.

== Professional career ==
=== Chicago Bears ===
After going undrafted in the 2007 NFL draft, Fassitt signed with the Chicago Bears as an undrafted free agent on May 7. He was waived on September 1 and re-signed to the team's practice squad the following day.

=== First stint with Saints ===
Fassitt signed a future contract with the New Orleans Saints on January 19, 2008. He was placed on injured reserve with a knee injury on August 30, and eventually released with an injury settlement on September 11.

=== Tampa Bay Buccaneers ===
Fassitt signed a future contract with the Tampa Bay Buccaneers on December 31, 2008. He was waived by the team on May 4, 2009.

=== Florida Tuskers ===
Fassitt was drafted by the Florida Tuskers of the United Football League in the UFL Premiere Season Draft in 2009. He signed with the team on August 17, but was released from his contract to sign with the New Orleans Saints.

=== Second stint with Saints ===
Fassitt was re-signed by the New Orleans Saints on August 17, 2009 after the team released cornerback Jason David. He was waived/injured on August 31 and subsequently reverted to injured reserve. He was released with an injury settlement on September 1.

The Saints re-signed Fassitt to their practice squad on November 28, 2009. He was promoted to the active roster on December 26 when the team waived tight end Tory Humphrey. The Saints waived Fassitt on December 29 and re-signed him to the practice squad. He was signed to a future contract on February 13, 2010. On June 15, 2010, Fassitt was released with an injury settlement.
