= Davellyn Whyte =

American basketball player

Personal information
- Born: May 14, 1991 (age 35) Mesa, Arizona, U.S.
- Listed height: 5 ft 11 in (1.80 m)
- Listed weight: 159 lb (72 kg)

Career information
- High school: St. Mary's (Phoenix, Arizona)
- College: Arizona (2009–2013)
- WNBA draft: 2013: 2nd round, 16th overall pick
- Drafted by: San Antonio Silver Stars
- Playing career: 2013–present
- Position: Guard

Career history
- 2013–2015: San Antonio Stars

Career highlights
- 4× All Pac-12 (2010–2013); Pac-10 Freshman of the Year (2010); Pac-10 All-Freshman Team (2010)
- Stats at WNBA.com
- Stats at Basketball Reference

Davellyn LaRae Whyte (born May 14, 1991) is an American professional basketball player who last played for the San Antonio Stars of the WNBA.

== College ==
Whyte played basketball for the Arizona Wildcats women's basketball team. When she left the team she set numerous accomplishments. She was the team's number 2 career leader in points scored (2,059), number 1 in career starts (126), number 1 in minutes played (4,243), compiled the first triple-double, and scored a double-double in 100 out of 126 career games. She was also the highest WNBA draft pick in Wildcats history.

== Career statistics ==
Legend
GP	Games played	GS	Games started	MPG	Minutes per game	RPG	Rebounds per game
APG	Assists per game	SPG	Steals per game	BPG	Blocks per game	PPG	Points per game
TO	Turnovers per game	FG%	Field-goal percentage	3P%	3-point field-goal percentage	FT%	Free-throw percentage
**Bold**	Career best	°	League leader

=== WNBA ===
==== Regular season ====
Year	Team	GP	GS	MPG	FG%	3P%	FT%	RPG	APG	SPG	BPG	TO	PPG
2013	San Antonio	29	4	14.9	32.3	30.0	75.7	1.9	1.8	0.7	0.2	1.4	4.5
2014	San Antonio	2	0	5.0	0.0	0.0	0.0	0.0	0.5	0.5	0.0	0.5	0.0
Career	2 years, 1 team	31	4	14.3	31.6	29.5	75.7	1.8	1.7	0.7	0.2	1.4	4.2

=== College ===
Legend
GP	Games played	GS	Games started	MPG	Minutes per game
FG%	Field goal percentage	3P%	3-point field goal percentage	FT%	Free throw percentage
RPG	Rebounds per game	APG	Assists per game	SPG	Steals per game
BPG	Blocks per game	PPG	Points per game	**Bold**	Career high

Year	Team	GP	Points	FG%	3P%	FT%	RPG	APG	SPG	BPG	PPG
2009-10	Arizona	31	487	**41.5**	35.3	75.5	4.3	2.5	1.3	0.3	15.7
2010-11	Arizona	**33**	523	39.3	31.1	75.5	4.6	2.9	1.9	0.3	15.8
2011-12	Arizona	32	**544**	37.9	**36.8**	**75.8**	**6.8**	3.2	2.6	0.1	17.0
2012-13	Arizona	30	505	37.2	32.1	75.5	6.3	**5.2**	2.6	**0.5**	**16.8**
Career	Arizona	126	2059	39.0	33.7	75.6	5.5	3.4	2.1	0.3	16.3

== WNBA ==
Whyte was the 16th pick in the 2013 WNBA draft.

== Personal ==
Whyte is the daughter of former MLB All-Star Devon Whyte.
