= A'dia Mathies =

American basketball player (born 1991)

Personal information
- Born: May 18, 1991 (age 35)
- Listed height: 5 ft 9 in (1.75 m)

Career information
- High school: Iroquois (Louisville, Kentucky)
- College: Kentucky (2009–2013)
- WNBA draft: 2013: 1st round, 10th overall pick
- Drafted by: Los Angeles Sparks
- Position: Guard

Career history
- 2013: Los Angeles Sparks

Career highlights
- Second-team All-American – AP (2013); Third-team All-American – AP (2012); 2× SEC Player of the Year (2012, 2013); All-American – USBWA (2012); 2× First-team All-SEC (2012, 2013); 2× SEC All-Defensive Team (2011, 2012); SEC Freshman of the Year (2010); SEC All-Freshman Team (2010); Kentucky Miss Basketball (2009)
- Stats at WNBA.com
- Stats at Basketball Reference

A'dia Mathies (born May 18, 1991) is an American professional basketball player, who was drafted in 2013 by the Los Angeles Sparks of the WNBA.

Mathies is a guard, and played her college ball at the University of Kentucky.

Mathies was drafted in the first round by the Sparks, and made the team out of training camp.

Mathies attended Iroquois High School in Louisville, Kentucky.

== Career statistics ==
Legend
| GP | Games played | GS | Games started | MPG | Minutes per game | RPG | Rebounds per game |
| APG | Assists per game | SPG | Steals per game | BPG | Blocks per game | PPG | Points per game |
| TO | Turnovers per game | FG% | Field-goal percentage | 3P% | 3-point field-goal percentage | FT% | Free-throw percentage |
| **Bold** | Career best | ° | League leader |

=== WNBA ===
==== Regular season ====
| Year | Team | GP | GS | MPG | FG% | 3P% | FT% | RPG | APG | SPG | BPG | TO | PPG |
|---|---|---|---|---|---|---|---|---|---|---|---|---|---|
| 2013 | Los Angeles | 30 | 0 | 9.2 | 35.3 | 25.0 | 64.0 | 0.7 | 0.8 | 0.3 | 0.1 | 0.6 | 2.3 |
| Career | 1 year, 1 team | 30 | 0 | 9.2 | 35.3 | 25.0 | 64.0 | 0.7 | 0.8 | 0.3 | 0.1 | 0.6 | 2.3 |

==== Playoffs ====
| Year | Team | GP | GS | MPG | FG% | 3P% | FT% | RPG | APG | SPG | BPG | TO | PPG |
|---|---|---|---|---|---|---|---|---|---|---|---|---|---|
| 2013 | Los Angeles | 1 | 0 | 3.0 | 0.0 | 0.0 | 0.0 | 0.0 | 0.0 | 0.0 | 0.0 | 0.0 | 0.0 |
| Career | 1 year, 1 team | 1 | 0 | 3.0 | 0.0 | 0.0 | 0.0 | 0.0 | 0.0 | 0.0 | 0.0 | 0.0 | 0.0 |

=== College ===
Legend
| GP | Games played | GS | Games started | MPG | Minutes per game |
| FG% | Field goal percentage | 3P% | 3-point field goal percentage | FT% | Free throw percentage |
| RPG | Rebounds per game | APG | Assists per game | SPG | Steals per game |
| BPG | Blocks per game | PPG | Points per game | **Bold** | Career high |

| Year | Team | GP | Points | FG% | 3P% | FT% | RPG | APG | SPG | BPG | PPG |
|---|---|---|---|---|---|---|---|---|---|---|---|
| 2009-10 | Kentucky | **36** | 491 | 40.5 | 29.0 | 69.8 | 4.8 | 2.4 | **2.6** | **0.6** | 13.6 |
| 2010-11 | Kentucky | 34 | 435 | **43.3** | 33.3 | 68.0 | 4.7 | 2.6 | 2.1 | 0.4 | 12.8 |
| 2011-12 | Kentucky | 34 | 509 | 42.7 | 37.8 | 68.1 | **5.1** | **2.7** | **2.6** | **0.6** | 15.0 |
| 2012-13 | Kentucky | **36** | **579** | 42.5 | **42.2** | **75.4** | 4.5 | 2.2 | 1.9 | 0.4 | **16.1** |
| Career | Kentucky | 140 | 2014 | 42.2 | 36.8 | 70.0 | 4.8 | 2.5 | 2.3 | 0.5 | 14.4 |
