= Farhiya Abdi =

Somali-Swedish basketball player (born 1992)

Grindavík
- Position: Forward
- League: Úrvalsdeild kvenna

Personal information
- Born: May 31, 1992 (age 34)
- Listed height: 6 ft 2 in (1.88 m)

Career information
- WNBA draft: 2012: 2nd round, 13th overall pick
- Drafted by: Los Angeles Sparks
- Playing career: 2011–present

Career history
- 2011–2013: BK Brno
- 2013–2015: Los Angeles Sparks
- 2016–2017: Maccabi Bnot Ashdod
- 2017: Mersin Buyuksehir Belediye
- 2017–2018: Perfumerias Avenida Salamanca
- 2018–2019: Galatasaray
- 2023–2024: Charnay Basket Bourgogne Sud
- 2025–present: Grindavík
- Stats at WNBA.com
- Stats at Basketball Reference

Farhiya Abdi (born March 31, 1992) is a Somali-Swedish professional basketball player. She has also played overseas since 2016.

== Career ==
Abdi was born in 1992 in Sweden. Her parent are Somali migrants.

Abdi initially played for BK Brno in the Czech Republic basketball league. In 2012, she joined the Los Angeles Sparks after being drafted with the first pick of the second round of the 2012 WNBA draft. She was the first Somali to play in the WNBA.

Abdi played three seasons in the WNBA, all with the Sparks. She played in one playoff game in her career as part of the 2014 playoffs.

She also competed in EuroLeague Women for Perfumerias Avenida Salamanca in 2017-18 and in EuroCup Women for Maccabi Bnot Ashdod in 2016-17 and for Galatasaray in 2018–19.

In September 2025, she signed with Grindavík of the Icelandic Úrvalsdeild kvenna. For the season she averaged 15.7 points, 6.2 rebounds and 4.1 assists. Following the season, she resigned with the team for the 2026-2027 season.
