= 2013 San Antonio Silver Stars season =

- Head coach: Dan Hughes
- Arena: AT&T Center

Results
- Record: 12–22 (.353)
- Place: 5th (Western)
- Playoff finish: Did not qualify

Media
- Television: FS-SW; ESPN2, NBATV

The 2013 WNBA season is the 17th season for the San Antonio Silver Stars franchise of the Women's National Basketball Association. It is their 11th in San Antonio.

== Transactions ==
=== WNBA draft ===
The following are the Silver Stars' selections in the 2013 WNBA draft.

Round	Pick	Player	Nationality	School/team/country	Source
1	8	Kayla Alexander	Canada	Syracuse	
2	16	Davellyn Whyte	United States	Arizona	
2	20	Diandra Tchatchouang	France	Perpignan (France)	
3	32	Whitney Head	United States	Oklahoma	

== Roster ==
2013 San Antonio Silver Stars roster
Players
Coaches

Pos.	No.	Nat.	Name	Height	Weight	DOB	From	Yrs
F/C	23	(United States)	Adams, Danielle	6' 1" (1.85m)	239 lb (108kg)	1989-02-09	Texas A&M	2
C	40	(United States)	Alexander, Kayla	6' 4" (1.93m)		1991-01-05	Syracuse	R
C	32	(United States)	Appel, Jayne	6' 4" (1.93m)	210 lb (95kg)	1988-05-14	Stanford	3
F	20	(United States)	Christon, Shameka	6' 1" (1.85m)	170 lb (77kg)	1982-02-15	Arkansas	8
G	25	(United States)	Hammon, Becky	5' 6" (1.68m)	136 lb (62kg)	1977-03-11	Colorado State	14
G	42	(United States)	Johnson, Shenise	5' 11" (1.8m)		1990-12-09	Miami (FL)	1
F	6	(United States)	Kraayeveld, Catherine	6' 3" (1.91m)	183 lb (83kg)	1981-09-30	Oregon	8
G	7	(United States)	Perkins, Jia	5' 8" (1.73m)	155 lb (70kg)	1982-02-23	Texas Tech	9
G	13	(United States)	Robinson, Danielle	5' 9" (1.75m)	125 lb (57kg)	1989-05-10	Oklahoma	2
G	0	(United States)	Whyte, Davellyn	5' 11" (1.8m)		1991-05-14	Arizona	R
F	33	(Saint Vincent and the Grenadines)	Young, Sophia	6' 1" (1.85m)	165 lb (75kg)	1983-12-15	Baylor	7
F	30	(United States)	Poppens, Chelsea	6' 2" (1.88m)		1991-02-19	Iowa State	R

Head coach
(United States) Dan Hughes (Muskingum)
Assistant coaches
(United States) Vickie Johnson (Louisiana Tech)
(United States) James Wade (Kennesaw State)
Athletic trainer
(United States) Tonya Holley (St. Andrews Presbyterian)
Strength and conditioning coach
(United States) Chrissy Stragisher (Muskingum)

Legend

- (C) Team captain
- (DP) Unsigned draft pick
- (FA) Free agent
- (S) Suspended
- Injured

=== Depth ===
Pos.	Starter	Bench
C	Jayne Appel	Kayla Alexander
PF	Shameka Christon	Danielle Adams; Sophia Young
SF	DeLisha Milton-Jones	Shenise Johnson
SG	Jia Perkins	Davellyn Whyte
PG	Danielle Robinson	Becky Hammon

== Season standings ==
#	Western Conference					
#	Team	W	L	PCT	GB	GP
1	z-Minnesota Lynx	26	8	.765	-	34
2	x-Los Angeles Sparks	24	10	.706	2	34
3	x-Phoenix Mercury	19	15	.559	7	34
4	x-Seattle Storm	17	17	.500	9	34
5	e-San Antonio Silver Stars	12	22	.353	14	34
6	e-Tulsa Shock	11	23	.324	15	34

== Schedule ==
=== Preseason ===
2013 pre-season game log
Total: 1–1 (Home: 0–1; Road: 1–0)
Pre-season: 1–1 (Home: 0–1; Road: 1–0)

Game	Date	Team	Score	High points	High rebounds	High assists	Location Attendance	Record
1	May 11	Indiana	L 75–80	Jia Perkins (14)	Julie Wojta (7)	Danielle Robinson (5)	AT&T Center; 4325	0–1
2	May 15	@ Indiana	W 64–58	Danielle Adams (11)	Jayne Appel (10)	Danielle Robinson (4)	Bankers Life Fieldhouse; 5339	1–1

2013 season schedule

=== Regular season ===
2013 game log
Total: 12–22 (Home: 8–9; Road: 4–13)
May: 0–1 (Home: 0–1; Road: 0–0)

Game	Date	Team	Score	High points	High rebounds	High assists	Location Attendance	Record
1	May 24	Indiana	L 64–79	Shenise Johnson (14)	Appel, Johnson, & Alexander (5)	Danielle Robinson (9)	AT&T Center; 8054	0–1

June : 3–6 (Home: 2–2; Road: 1–4)

Game	Date	Team	Score	High points	High rebounds	High assists	Location Attendance	Record
2	June 1	Los Angeles	W 83–78	Shenise Johnson (19)	Jayne Appel (9)	Danielle Robinson (7)	AT&T Center; 6081	1–1
3	June 7	Chicago	W 81–69	Danielle Robinson (18)	Jayne Appel (10)	Danielle Robinson (7)	AT&T Center; 6244	2–1
4	June 9	@ Chicago	L 70–72	Jia Perkins (20)	Jayne Appel (8)	Danielle Robinson (7)	Allstate Arena; 4293	2–2
5	June 11	@ Minnesota	L 72–87	Shenise Johnson (16)	DeLisha Milton-Jones (8)	Danielle Robinson (7)	Target Center; 7913	2–3
6	June 15	@ Los Angeles	L 48–84	Danielle Adams (12)	Shenise Johnson (6)	Davellyn Whyte (5)	Staples Center; 6980	2–4
7	June 21	Seattle	L 86–91	Jia Perkins (21)	Shenise Johnson (7)	Danielle Robinson (6)	AT&T Center; 7009	2–5
8	June 23	@ NY Liberty	W 78–77 (OT)	Danielle Robinson (18)	Danielle Adams (11)	Danielle Robinson (4)	Prudential Center; 6123	3–5
9	June 25	Phoenix	L 77–83	Christon, Adams, & Robinson (15)	Milton-Jones & Robinson (6)	Danielle Robinson (10)	AT&T Center; 9007	3–6
10	June 30	@ Atlanta	L 67–93	Jia Perkins (19)	Alexander & Whyte (5)	Danielle Robinson (9)	Philips Arena; 5359	3–7

July : 3–5 (Home: 2–2; Road: 1–3)

Game	Date	Team	Score	High points	High rebounds	High assists	Location Attendance	Record
11	July 6	@ Los Angeles	L 66–93	DeLisha Milton-Jones (20)	Jayne Appel (9)	Danielle Robinson (5)	Staples Center; 9807	3–8
12	July 10	@ Phoenix	W 88–80	Danielle Adams (19)	Jayne Appel (8)	Danielle Robinson (9)	US Airways Center; 8707	4–8
13	July 12	Washington	L 73–83	Jia Perkins (22)	DeLisha Milton-Jones (7)	Danielle Robinson (9)	AT&T Center; 11268	4–9
14	July 14	@ Connecticut	L 84–86	Jia Perkins (23)	Jayne Appel (8)	Danielle Robinson (8)	Mohegan Sun Arena; 6335	4–10
15	July 16	@ Washington	L 64–86	Johnson & Perkins (12)	Milton-Jones & Alexander (6)	Danielle Robinson (8)	Verizon Center; 6843	4–11
16	July 19	Minnesota	L 71–87	Adams, Perkins, & Johnson (13)	Jayne Appel (9)	Danielle Robinson (3)	AT&T Center; 7105	4–12
17	July 20	Connecticut	W 60–52	Danielle Adams (20)	Jayne Appel (18)	Jia Perkins (4)	AT&T Center; 8375	5–12
18	July 25	NY Liberty	W 65–53	Danielle Adams (20)	Jayne Appel (13)	Danielle Robinson (6)	AT&T Center; 12086	6–12

August : 5–7 (Home: 3–3; Road: 2–4)

Game	Date	Team	Score	High points	High rebounds	High assists	Location Attendance	Record
All-Star Break
19	August 2	@ Minnesota	L 63–85	Shameka Christon (15)	Jayne Appel (9)	Danielle Robinson (7)	Target Center; 8733	6–13
20	August 4	Tulsa	W 69–65	Danielle Robinson (19)	Jayne Appel (13)	Danielle Robinson (9)	AT&T Center; 7950	7–13
21	August 6	Minnesota	L 80–93	Danielle Adams (31)	Danielle Robinson (9)	Danielle Robinson (10)	AT&T Center; 5390	7–14
22	August 9	@ Seattle	W 77–56	Shenise Johnson (15)	Jayne Appel (7)	Danielle Robinson (8)	Key Arena; 5978	8–14
23	August 11	@ Seattle	L 63–69	Jia Perkins (19)	Jayne Appel (16)	Danielle Robinson (6)	Key Arena; 6249	8–15
24	August 17	Phoenix	W 88–82	Adams & Robinson (20)	Jayne Appel (8)	Danielle Robinson (8)	AT&T Center; 10906	9–15
25	August 21	@ Indiana	L 63–80	Danielle Adams (17)	Danielle Adams (9)	Jayne Appel (4)	Bankers Life Fieldhouse; 7416	9–16
26	August 23	@ Tulsa	L 67–73	Shameka Christon (18)	Johnson & Alexander (8)	Perkins & Christon (3)	BOK Center; 5923	9–17
27	August 25	Seattle	W 70–64	Shenise Johnson (17)	Shenise Johnson (10)	Davellyn Whyte (7)	AT&T Center; 6828	10–17
28	August 27	Seattle	L 71–72	Jia Perkins (17)	Johnson & Appel (6)	Davellyn Whyte (4)	AT&T Center; 6097	10–18
29	August 30	@ Tulsa	W 74–65	Jia Perkins (19)	Jayne Appel (11)	Johnson & Perkins (4)	BOK Center; 5452	11–18
30	August 31	Los Angeles	L 67–80	Jia Perkins (25)	Jayne Appel (12)	Jia Perkins (3)	AT&T Center; 8086	11–19

September: 1–3 (Home: 1–1; Road: 0–2)

Game	Date	Team	Score	High points	High rebounds	High assists	Location Attendance	Record
31	September 6	@ Phoenix	L 80–83	Danielle Adams (26)	Jayne Appel (17)	Shenise Johnson (4)	US Airways Center; 9006	11–20
32	September 8	Tulsa	L 65–98	Jia Perkins (21)	Jayne Appel (7)	Appel & Johnson (4)	AT&T Center; 6560	11–21
33	September 13	@ Phoenix	L 61–82	Adams & Johnson (11)	Jayne Appel (10)	Shenise Johnson (4)	US Airways Center; 8899	11–22
34	September 15	Atlanta	W 97–68	Danielle Adams (39)	Danielle Adams (8)	Shenise Johnson (6)	AT&T Center; 7486	12–22

2013 season schedule

== Statistics ==
Legend
GP	Games played	GS	Games started	MPG	Minutes per game	RPG	Rebounds per game
APG	Assists per game	SPG	Steals per game	BPG	Blocks per game	PPG	Points per game
FG%	Field-goal percentage	3P%	3-point field-goal percentage	FT%	Free-throw percentage	TO	Turnovers per game
PF	Fouls per game		Team leader		League leader

=== Regular season ===
Player	GP	GS	MPG	FG%	3P%	FT%	RPG	APG	SPG	BPG	PPG
