= 2013 Los Angeles Sparks season =

- Coach: Carol Ross
- Arena: Staples Center
- Attendance: per game

Results
- Record: 24–10 (.706)
- Place: 2nd (Western)
- Playoff finish: Lost in Conference Semifinals

Media
- Television: TWC SportsNet and TWC Deportes; ESPN2, NBATV

The 2013 Los Angeles Sparks season was the franchise's 17th season in the Women's National Basketball Association, and the second season under head coach Carol Ross. The season tipped off on May 26, 2013, in Staples Center versus the Seattle Storm and ended on September 15 against the Phoenix Mercury.

== Transactions ==
=== WNBA draft ===
The following are the Sparks' selections in the 2013 WNBA draft.

Round	Pick	Player	Nationality	School/team/country
1	10	A'dia Mathies	United States United States	Florida Gulf Coast
2	22	Brittany Chambers (Note: Brittany Chambers was released by the Sparks before the start of the season.)	United States United States	Kansas State
3	34	Alina Iagupova (Note: Los Angeles's selection of Alina Iagupova was subsequently voided by the league due to her age, under Article XIII, section 1(d) of the Collective Bargaining Agreement.)	Ukraine	Elizabeth-Basket Kivorograd (Ukraine)

=== Trades ===
Date	Trade	
TBD	To Los Angeles Sparks	To TBD
TBD	TBD	TBD

=== Personnel changes ===
==== Additions ====
Player	Signed	Former team

==== Subtractions ====
Player	Left	New team

== Roster ==
2013 Los Angeles Sparks roster
Players
Coaches

Pos.	No.	Nat.	Name	Height	Weight	DOB	From	Yrs
F	13	(Sweden)	Abdi, Farhiya	6' 2" (1.88m)		1992-05-31	Sweden	R
G/F	0	(United States)	Beard, Alana	5' 11" (1.8m)	160 lb (73kg)	1982-05-14	Duke	7
G/F	25	(United States)	Coleman, Marissa	6' 1" (1.85m)	160 lb (73kg)	1987-01-04	Maryland	4
G	10	(United States)	Harding, Lindsey	5' 8" (1.73m)	135 lb (61kg)	1984-06-12	Duke	6
F	16	(United States)	Hoffman, Ebony	6' 2" (1.88m)	215 lb (98kg)	1982-08-27	USC	9
C	42	(United States)	Lavender, Jantel	6' 4" (1.93m)	185 lb (84kg)	1988-11-12	Ohio State	2
G	1	(United States)	Mathies, A'dia	5' 9" (1.75m)		1991-03-18	Kentucky	R
F	30	(United States)	Ogwumike, Nneka	6' 2" (1.88m)	188 lb (85kg)	1990-07-02	Stanford	2
G/F	6	(Australia)	O'Hea, Jenna	6' 1" (1.85m)	174 lb (79kg)	1987-06-06	Australia	2
F/C	3	(United States)	Parker, Candace	6' 4" (1.93m)	175 lb (79kg)	1986-04-19	Tennessee	5
G	20	(United States)	Toliver, Kristi	5' 7" (1.7m)	130 lb (59kg)	1987-01-27	Maryland	4

Head coach
(United States) Carol Ross (Mississippi)
Assistant coaches
(Australia) Sandy Brondello (Australia)
(United States) Bridget Pettis (Florida)
Athletic trainer
(United States) Courtney Watson (California)
Strength and conditioning coach
(United States) Bruce Deziel (Ohio)

Legend

- (C) Team captain
- (DP) Unsigned draft pick
- (FA) Free agent
- (S) Suspended
- Injured

=== Depth ===
Pos.	Starter	Bench
C	Candace Parker	Jantel Lavender
PF	Nneka Ogwumike	Ebony Hoffman; Farhiya Abdi
SF	Alana Beard	Marissa Coleman
SG	Kristi Toliver	Jenna O'Hea
PG	Lindsey Harding	A'dia Mathies

== Season standings ==
#	Western Conference					
#	Team	W	L	PCT	GB	GP
1	z-Minnesota Lynx	26	8	.765	-	34
2	x-Los Angeles Sparks	24	10	.706	2	34
3	x-Phoenix Mercury	19	15	.559	7	34
4	x-Seattle Storm	17	17	.500	9	34
5	e-San Antonio Silver Stars	12	22	.353	14	34
6	e-Tulsa Shock	11	23	.324	15	34

== Schedule ==
=== Preseason ===
2013 pre-season game log
Total: 0–2 (Home: 0–2; Road: 0–0)
Pre-season: 0–2 (Home: 0–2; Road: 0–0)

Game	Date	Team	Score	High points	High rebounds	High assists	Location Attendance	Record
1	May 12	Seattle	L 66–67	Ebony Hoffman (8)	Paola Ferrari (6)	Coleman, O'Hea, & Abdi (2)	Walter Pyramid at Long Beach State; 1524	0–1
2	May 19	Tulsa	L 67–82	Kristi Toliver (11)	Candace Parker (7)	Lindsey Harding (4)	SRC Arena; 1917	0–2

2013 season schedule

=== Regular season ===
2013 game log
Total: 24–10 (Home: 15–2; Road: 9–8)
May: 1–0 (Home: 1–0; Road: 0–0)

Game	Date	Team	Score	High points	High rebounds	High assists	Location Attendance	Record
1	May 26	Seattle	W 102–69	Kristi Toliver (17)	Jantel Lavender (6)	Lindsey Harding (8)	Staples Center; 10090	1–0

June : 4–4 (Home: 4–0; Road: 0–4)

Game	Date	Team	Score	High points	High rebounds	High assists	Location Attendance	Record
2	June 1	@ San Antonio	L 78–83	Candace Parker (27)	Candace Parker (20)	Lindsey Harding (5)	AT&T Center; 6081	1–1
3	June 8	Tulsa	W 76–69 (OT)	Kristi Toliver (21)	Candace Parker (13)	Lindsey Harding (8)	Staples Center; 6110	2–1
4	June 14	@ Phoenix	L 81–97	Kristi Toliver (18)	Nneka Ogwumike (10)	Candace Parker (3)	US Airways Center; 13065	2–2
5	June 15	San Antonio	W 84–48	Nneka Ogwumike (16)	Nneka Ogwumike (7)	Parker & Toliver (6)	Staples Center; 6980	3–2
6	June 21	Minnesota	W 87–59	Kristi Toliver (19)	Ogwumike, Parker, & Lavender (8)	Nneka Ogwumike (5)	Staples Center; 6490	4–2
7	June 23	Washington	W 79–69	Lindsey Harding (22)	Nneka Ogwumike (9)	Lindsey Harding (7)	Staples Center; 9651	5–2
8	June 28	@ Minnesota	L 64–88	Candace Parker (17)	Candace Parker (11)	Candace Parker (6)	Target Center; 8814	5–3
9	June 29	@ Chicago	L 82–94	Candace Parker (23)	Candace Parker (9)	Candace Parker (4)	Allstate Arena; 6885	5–4

July : 7–2 (Home: 4–2; Road: 3–0)

Game	Date	Team	Score	High points	High rebounds	High assists	Location Attendance	Record
10	July 2	Minnesota	W 96–66	Candace Parker (27)	Nneka Ogwumike (10)	Kristi Toliver (9)	Staples Center; 7856	6–4
11	July 4	NY Liberty	W 97–89	Kristi Toliver (29)	Candace Parker (8)	Lindsey Harding (8)	Staples Center; 8565	7–4
12	July 6	San Antonio	W 93–66	Nneka Ogwumike (24)	Nneka Ogwumike (16)	Parker & Harding (3)	Staples Center; 9807	8–4
13	July 11	@ Tulsa	W 94–78	Candace Parker (30)	Candace Parker (8)	Lindsey Harding (8)	BOK Center; 6278	9–4
14	July 14	@ Phoenix	W 88–76	Candace Parker (21)	Nneka Ogwumike (13)	Kristi Toliver (6)	US Airways Center; 8233	10–4
15	July 17	Atlanta	W 77–73	Kristi Toliver (15)	Candace Parker (10)	Lindsey Harding (6)	Staples Center; 10876	11–4
16	July 18	Phoenix	L 84–90	Candace Parker (25)	Candace Parker (16)	Jenna O'Hea (5)	Staples Center; 11105	11–5
17	July 20	@ Seattle	W 65–64	Nneka Ogwumike (24)	Nneka Ogwumike (9)	Lindsey Harding (8)	Key Arena; 6357	12–5
18	July 25	Seattle	L 66–73	Candace Parker (24)	Candace Parker (10)	Kristi Toliver (3)	Staples Center; 12651	12–6

August : 9–2 (Home: 4–0; Road: 5–2)

Game	Date	Team	Score	High points	High rebounds	High assists	Location Attendance	Record
All-Star Break
19	August 2	@ Tulsa	L 89–96	Kristi Toliver (23)	Nneka Ogwumike (11)	Lindsey Harding (6)	BOK Center; 6168	12–7
20	August 4	@ Washington	W 75–57	Nneka Ogwumike (22)	Jantel Lavender (11)	Lindsey Harding (14)	Verizon Center; 7092	13–7
21	August 6	@ Connecticut	W 74–72	Kristi Toliver (19)	Ogwumike & Toliver (9)	Toliver & Harding (4)	Mohegan Sun Arena; 5792	14–7
22	August 8	@ Indiana	W 74–64	Jantel Lavender (18)	Jantel Lavender (9)	Lindsey Harding (5)	Bankers Life Fieldhouse; 7076	15–7
23	August 10	@ NY Liberty	W 85–67	Jantel Lavender (18)	Jantel Lavender (8)	Lindsey Harding (4)	Prudential Center; 7569	16–7
24	August 13	Chicago	W 80–76	Candace Parker (18)	Ogwumike, Parker, & Lavender (7)	Parker, Toliver, & Coleman (4)	Staples Center; 10553	17–7
25	August 16	Indiana	W 94–72	Kristi Toliver (28)	Nneka Ogwumike (7)	Lindsey Harding (7)	Staples Center; 11801	18–7
26	August 20	@ Seattle	L 57–77	Nneka Ogwumike (12)	Candace Parker (10)	Parker & Harding (3)	Key Arena; 6738	18–8
27	August 25	Tulsa	W 90–88 (2OT)	Candace Parker (26)	Candace Parker (11)	Candace Parker (9)	Staples Center; 9973	19–8
28	August 27	Connecticut	W 91–78	Candace Parker (28)	Nneka Ogwumike (12)	Candace Parker (7)	Staples Center; 11401	20–8
29	August 31	@ San Antonio	W 80–67	Nneka Ogwumike (19)	Candace Parker (11)	Kristi Toliver (7)	AT&T Center; 8086	21–8

September : 3–2 (Home: 2–0; Road: 1–2)

Game	Date	Team	Score	High points	High rebounds	High assists	Location Attendance	Record
30	September 2	@ Atlanta	L 82–92	Nneka Ogwumike (17)	Nneka Ogwumike (10)	Kristi Toliver (9)	Philips Arena; 5504	21–9
31	September 4	@ Minnesota	L 74–83	Candace Parker (25)	Candace Parker (8)	Nneka Ogwumike (4)	Target Center; 9314	21–10
32	September 6	@ Tulsa	W 74–70	Candace Parker (20)	Candace Parker (9)	Lindsey Harding (10)	BOK Center; 6704	22–10
33	September 12	Minnesota	W 85–84	Nneka Ogwumike (25)	Nneka Ogwumike (11)	Parker & Toliver (4)	Staples Center; 11553	23–10
34	September 15	Phoenix	W 89–55	Parker & Lavender (16)	Jantel Lavender (9)	Lindsey Harding (5)	Staples Center; 12311	24–10

2013 season schedule

=== Playoffs ===
2013 playoff game log
Total: 1–2 (Home: 0–2; Road: 1–0)
Conference Semifinals: 1–2 (Home: 0–2; Road: 1–0)

Game	Date	Team	Score	High points	High rebounds	High assists	Location Attendance	Series
1	September 19	Phoenix	L 75–86	Candace Parker (28)	Nneka Ogwumike (14)	Lindsey Harding (5)	Staples Center; 8500	0–1
2	September 21	@ Phoenix	W 82–73	Candace Parker (31)	Ogwumike & Parker (11)	Lindsey Harding (4)	US Airways Center; 11110	1–1
3	September 23	Phoenix	L 77–78	Kristi Toliver (22)	Nneka Ogwumike (10)	Toliver & Coleman (3)	Staples Center; 9321	1–2

2013 season schedule

== Statistics ==
Legend
GP	Games played	GS	Games started	MPG	Minutes per game	RPG	Rebounds per game
APG	Assists per game	SPG	Steals per game	BPG	Blocks per game	PPG	Points per game
FG%	Field-goal percentage	3P%	3-point field-goal percentage	FT%	Free-throw percentage	TO	Turnovers per game
PF	Fouls per game		Team leader		League leader

=== Regular season ===
Player	GP	GS	MPG	FG%	3P%	FT%	RPG	APG	SPG	BPG	PPG
