= 2009–10 Pacific-10 Conference women's basketball season =

2009-10 Pac-10 Women's Basketball Season
- League: NCAA Division I
- Sport: Basketball
- Teams: 10

Regular Season
- Champion: Stanford
- Runners-up: UCLA
- Season MVP: Nneka Ogwumike

Tournament
- Champions: Stanford
- Runners-up: UCLA
- Finals MVP: Nneka Ogwumike

Basketball seasons
- 08–09 10–11

2009–10 Pacific-10 Conference women's basketball standings
	Conf.				Overall
Team	W		L	PCT	W		L	PCT
No. 2 Stanford †	18	–	0	1.000	36	–	2	.947
No. 23 UCLA	15	–	3	.833	25	–	9	.735
USC	12	–	6	.667	19	–	12	.613
California	11	–	7	.611	24	–	13	.649
Arizona State	9	–	9	.500	18	–	14	.563
Oregon	7	–	11	.389	18	–	16	.529
Washington	7	–	11	.389	13	–	18	.419
Arizona	6	–	12	.333	14	–	17	.452
Washington State	3	–	15	.167	8	–	22	.267
Oregon State	2	–	16	.111	11	–	20	.355
† 2010 Pacific-10 Tournament winner As of April 6, 2010; Rankings from AP Poll

The 2009–10 Pacific-10 Conference women's basketball season began in October and ended with the Pac-10 Tournament on March 11–14, 2010 at the Galen Center, Los Angeles, California. Stanford won both the regular season and the tournament championships. Stanford and UCLA were selected to participate in the NCAA tournament. Stanford was the runner-up of the NCAA National Championship and completed the season with a 36–2 record. Cal won the WNIT Championship.

== Pre-season ==
- Michael Cooper was hired as new coach for the USC Trojans.
- Paul Westhead became the new coach for the Oregon Ducks.

2009–10 Pac-10 Women's Basketball Coaches' Pre-season Poll:

1. Stanford
2. California
3. Arizona State
4. UCLA
5. USC
6. Washington State
7. Oregon State
8. Oregon
9. Arizona
10. Washington

== Rankings ==
- Stanford has been ranked #2 in the polls.
- March 1, 2010 – UCLA Bruins is rated No. 25 in the ESPN/USA Today Coaches' Poll.
- March 8, 2010 – Stanford #2, UCLA #23 (AP Top 25).
- April 7, 2010 – Stanford #2, UCLA #23 (final USA Today/ESPN coaches poll)

== Conference games ==
- January 31, 2010 – At the half point mark of the conference season, Stanford is on top of the standings, followed by UCLA and USC at second place.

== Conference tournament ==
2010 State Farm Pacific-10 Conference women's basketball tournament was a post season tournament for the women's basketball teams in the Pacific-10 Conference. The games were held on Thursday through Sunday, March 11–14, at the Galen Center (Los Angeles, California). Tournament winner became the NCAA tournament automatic qualifier. Stanford again was the winner.

Last year, Stanford won the tournament over USC, 89–64.

== Head coaches ==
- Niya Butts, Arizona
- Charli Turner Thorne, Arizona State
- Joanne Boyle, California
- Paul Westhead, Oregon
- LaVonda Wagner, Oregon State
- Tara VanDerveer, Stanford
- Nikki Caldwell, UCLA
- Michael Cooper, USC
- Tia Jackson, Washington
- June Daugherty, Washington State

== Postseason ==
=== NCAA tournament ===
- Saturday, March 20 – first round, #1-seed Stanford def. #16-seed UC Riverside 79–47, at Sacramento Regional, Stanford, CA
- Sunday, March 21 – first round, #8-seed UCLA def. #9-seed NC State 74–54, at Kansas City Regional, Minneapolis, MN
- Monday, March 22 – second round, Stanford def. #8 Iowa 96–67, at Sacramento Regional, Stanford, CA
- Tuesday, March 23 – second round, Nebraska def. UCLA 83–70, at Kansas City Regional, Minneapolis, MN
- Saturday, March 27 – second round, Stanford def. #5 Georgia 73–36, at Sacramento Regional, Sacramento, CA
- Monday, March 29, Stanford def. Xavier 55–53, at Sacramento Regional finals, Sacramento, CA
- Sunday, April 4, Stanford def. Oklahoma 73–66, at the semifinals, San Antonio, Texas
- Tuesday, April 6, 5:30 PM, Connecticut def. Stanford 53–47, Alamodome, San Antonio, Texas (NCAA Championship Game)

=== WNIT tournament ===
- Wednesday, March 17 – California def. UC Davis 74–69 (OT), 7 p.m. PT (first round)
- Wednesday, March 17 – Arizona State def. New Mexico State 84–61, 6:30 p.m. PT (first round)
- Thursday, March 18 – Oregon def. Eastern Washington 95–66, 7 p.m. PT (first round)
- Tuesday, March 23 – BYU 61, Arizona State 53, 9:30 p.m. ET (second round)
- Tuesday, March 23 – California 64, Utah 54, 10 p.m. ET (second round)
- Tuesday, March 23 – Oregon 93, New Mexico 67, 10 p.m. ET (second round)
- Thursday, March 25 – California 71, Oregon 57, Eugene, Oregon (Regional)
- Saturday, March 27 – California 76, BYU, 50, Haas Pavilion, Berkeley, California (quarterfinals)
- Thursday, April 1 – California def. Illinois State 61–45, Normal, Illinois (WNIT Semifinals)
- Saturday, April 3 - California def. Miami 73–61, Berkeley, California (WNIT Championship Game)

=== WBI tournament ===
- Wednesday, March 17 – Washington def. Portland 75–44 (first round)
- Sunday, Mar. 21 – Texas A&M-Corpus Christi def. Washington, 59–58 (West Region Semifinals)

== Highlights and notes ==
- January 21, 2010 – Pacific-10 Conference issued a public reprimand to Michael Cooper for his post-game comments following USC's game with UCLA on Sunday, January 17.

== Awards and honors ==
=== Scholar-Athlete of the Year ===
- Jayne Appel, Stanford – Toyo Tires Pac-10 Women's Basketball Scholar-Athlete of the Year

=== Player-of-the-Week ===
2009–10 Pac-10 Players of the Week:

- Nov. 16 – Nnemkadi Ogwumike, Stanford
- Nov. 23 – Nicole Canepa, Oregon
- Nov. 30 – Kayla Pedersen, Stanford
- Dec. 7 – Amanda Johnson, Oregon
- Dec. 14 – Nnemkadi Ogwumike, Stanford
- Dec. 21 – Kayla Pedersen, Stanford
- Dec. 28 – Sami Whitcomb, Washington
- Jan. 4 – Taylor Lilley, Oregon
- Jan. 11 – Nnemkadi Ogwumike, Stanford
- Jan. 18 – Davellyn Whyte, Arizona
- Jan. 25 – Alexis Gray-Lawson, California
- Feb. 1 – Markel Walker, UCLA
- Feb. 8 – April Cook, Washington State
- Feb. 15 – Jayne Appel, Stanford
- Feb. 22 – Jayne Appel, Stanford
- Mar. 1 - Jasmine Dixon, UCLA
- Mar. 7 – Ashley Corral, USC

=== All-Pac-10 teams ===
The awards listed below were determined by vote of the conference coaches and announced on March 11.

- Player of the Year: Nnemkadi Ogwumike, Stanford
- Freshman of the Year: Davellyn White, Arizona
- Defensive Player of the Year: Briana Gilbreath, USC and Rosalyn Gold-Onwude, Stanford
- Coach of the Year: Nikki Caldwell, UCLA

FIRST TEAM:

Name	School	Pos.	Year	Hometown
Jayne Appel	Stanford	C	Sr.	Pleasant Hill, Calif.
Doreena Campbell	UCLA	G	Jr.	Alexandria, Va.
Micaela Cocks	Oregon	G	Sr.	Auckland, New Zealand
Ashley Corral	USC	G	So.	Vancouver, Wash.
Jasmine Dixon	UCLA	F	So.	Long Beach, Calif.
Briana Gilbreath	USC	G	So.	Katy, Texas
Alexis Gray-Lawson	California	G	Sr.	Oakland, Calif.
Ify Ibekwe	Arizona	F	Jr.	Carson, Calif.
Taylor Lilley	Oregon	G	Sr.	Newhall, Calif.
Nnemkadi Ogwumike	Stanford	F	So.	Cypress, Texas
Kayla Pedersen	Stanford	F	Jr.	Fountain Hills, Ariz.
Jeanette Pohlen	Stanford	G	Jr.	Brea, Calif.
Danielle Orsillo	Arizona State	G	Sr.	Oroville, Calif.
Sami Whitcomb	Washington	G/F	Sr.	Ventura, Calif.
Davellyn Whyte	Arizona	G	Fr.	Phoenix, Ariz.

=== All-Academic ===
First Team:

Player	School	Year	GPA	Major
Lauren Greif	California	Sr.	3.58	Psychology
Amanda Johnson	Oregon	So.	4.03	Psychology/Sociology
Danielle Roark	USC	Sr.	3.58	Kinesiology
Allison Taka	UCLA	Sr.	3.76	Sociology
Kirsten Tilleman	Oregon State	So.	3.83	Natural Resources

Second Team:

Player	School	Year	GPA	Major
Jayne Appel	Stanford	Sr.	3.16	Psychology
Julie Futch	Oregon State	Sr.	3.52	Liberal Studies
JJ Hones	Stanford	RS Jr.	3.49	International Relations
Danielle Orsillo	Arizona State	Gr.	3.47	Higher & Postsecondary Education
Erica Tukiainen	UCLA	Sr.	3.42	French/Pre-Med

=== Women's Basketball Media Awards ===
These end-of-season honors were voted on by media and announced on March 9.

- Player of the Year: Nnemkadi Ogwumike, Stanford
- Freshman of the Year: Davellyn White, Arizona
- Defensive Player of the Year: Ify Ibekwe, Arizona
- Coach of the Year: Nikki Caldwell, UCLA

2010 Pac-10 Media All-Pac-10

- Nnemkadi Ogwumike, Stanford
- Jayne Appel, Stanford
- Alexis Gray-Lawson, California
- Kayla Pedersen, Stanford
- Ify Ibekwe, Arizona
- Jasmine Dixon, UCLA
- Ashley Corral, USC
- Taylor Lilley, Oregon
- Danielle Orsillo, Arizona State
- Davellyn Whyte, Arizona
- Jeanette Pohlen, Stanford
- Markel Walker, UCLA
- Talisa Rhea, Oregon State
- Sami Whitcomb, Washington
- Briana Gilbreath, USC
