= 2009–10 Stanford Cardinal women's basketball team =

Intercollegiate basketball season

2009–10 Stanford Cardinal women's basketball

Pacific-10 Champion Pacific-10 tournament champion

NCAA, Runner-up
- Conference: Pacific-10 Conference

Ranking
- Coaches: No. 2
- AP: No. 2
- Record: 36–2 (18–0 Pac-10)
- Head coach: Tara VanDerveer (25th season)
- Assistant coaches: Amy Tucker Associate head coach (25th season); Bobbie Kelsey Assistant Coach (3rd season); Kate Paye Assistant Coach (3rd season)
- Home arena: Maples Pavilion

2009–10 Pacific-10 Conference women's basketball standings
	Conf.				Overall
Team	W		L	PCT	W		L	PCT
No. 2 Stanford †	18	–	0	1.000	36	–	2	.947
No. 23 UCLA	15	–	3	.833	25	–	9	.735
USC	12	–	6	.667	19	–	12	.613
California	11	–	7	.611	24	–	13	.649
Arizona State	9	–	9	.500	18	–	14	.563
Oregon	7	–	11	.389	18	–	16	.529
Washington	7	–	11	.389	13	–	18	.419
Arizona	6	–	12	.333	14	–	17	.452
Washington State	3	–	15	.167	8	–	22	.267
Oregon State	2	–	16	.111	11	–	20	.355
† 2010 Pacific-10 Tournament winner As of April 6, 2010; Rankings from AP Poll

The 2009–10 Stanford Cardinal women's basketball team represented Stanford University in the 2009–10 NCAA Division I women's basketball season. The Cardinal, coached by Tara VanDerveer, were member of the Pacific-10 Conference, where they won the conference's regular-season and tournament titles, and were the runner-up at the NCAA championship.

== Offseason ==
- May 17: All five Stanford women's basketball players invited to the USA Basketball trials camps were named finalists for their respective teams. Freshmen Sarah Boothe and Nnemkadi Ogwumike were among the 14 finalists named for the USA Women's U19 World Championship Team. Junior Jayne Appel and sophomores Kayla Pedersen and Jeanette Pohlen were among the 14 finalists named for the 2009 USA Women's World University Games Team.

Appel, Pedersen and Pohlen will return to Colorado Springs, Colo. on June 18 for training camp. The camp will last until the team's departure on June 25 for the 2009 World University Games. The 12-woman roster will be named prior to the team's departure for the Games, which are set to take place from July 1–11 in Belgrade, Serbia.
Boothe and Ogwumike will return to Colorado Springs for training camp on July 9, where the final 12-woman roster for the U19 World Championship will be determined. The 2009 FIBA U19 World Championship is set to take place from July 23–August 2 in Bangkok, Thailand.

- July 30: The Women's Basketball Coaches Association (WBCA), on behalf of the Wade Coalition, announced the 2009–2010 preseason "Wade Watch" list for The State Farm Wade Trophy Division I Player of the Year. Three players from the Cardinal, Jayne Appel, Kayla Pederson and Jeannette Pohlen, have been named to the 2009–10 preseason "Wade Watch" list, which is made up of top NCAA Division I student-athletes who best embody the spirit of Lily Margaret Wade. This is based on the following criteria: game and season statistics, leadership, character, effect on their team and overall playing ability.
- August 21: The 2009–10 preseason candidates list for the Women's Wooden Award was released, naming 31 student athletes. Jayne Appel and Jeanette Pohlen from Stanford were two of the candidates.

== Regular season ==
- Jayne Appel became the leading rebounder in Pac-10 history on February 27, 2010, surpassing Lisa Leslie's record of 1,214 career rebounds.

=== Schedule ===
Date time, TV	Rank^{#}	Opponent^{#}	Result	Record	Site city, state
Pre-Season Schedule
November 1*; 2:00 pm, no	No. 2	Vanguard	W 107–49		Maples Pavilion; Stanford, California
November 8*; 2:00 pm, no	No. 2	UC San Diego	W 107–55		Maples Pavilion; Stanford, California
Non-conference regular season Schedule
November 13*; 4:00 pm, no	No. 2	at Old Dominion	W 89–56	1–0	Ted Constant Convocation Center; Norfolk, Virginia
November 15*; 11:00 am, no	No. 2	at No. 25 Rutgers	W 81–66	2–0	Louis Brown Athletic Center; Piscataway, New Jersey
November 19*; 7:00 pm, no	No. 2	Pepperdine	W 99–50	3–0	Maples Pavilion; Stanford, California
November 22*; 2:00 pm, no	No. 2	at UC Davis	W 76–51	4–0	The Pavilion; Davis, California
November 27*; 1:00 pm, no	No. 2	Utah	W 60–41	5–0	Maples Pavilion; Stanford, California
November 29*; 2:00 pm, no	No. 2	Gonzaga	W 105–74	6–0	Maples Pavilion; Stanford, California
December 13*; 2:00 pm, no	No. 2	DePaul	W 96–60	7–0	Maples Pavilion; Stanford, California
December 15*; 7:00 pm, no	No. 2	No. 7 Duke	W 71–55	8–0	Maples Pavilion; Stanford, California
December 19*; 11:30 am, no	No. 2	No. 3 Tennessee; Rivalry	W 67–52	9–0	Maples Pavilion; Stanford, California
December 23*; 2:30 pm, no	No. 2	at No. 1 Connecticut; Rivalry	L 68–80	9–1	XL Center; Hartford, Connecticut
December 30*; 7:00 pm, no	No. 2	at Fresno State	W 68–46	10–1	Save Mart Center; Fresno, California
Pacific-10 Conference regular season Schedule
January 2; 12:00 pm, no	No. 2	California	W 79–58	11–1 (1–0 Pac-10)	Maples Pavilion; Stanford, California
January 8; 7:00 pm, no	No. 2	at USC	W 82–62	12–1 (2–0 Pac-10)	Galen Center; Los Angeles, California
January 10; 2:00 pm, no	No. 2	at UCLA	W 65–61	13–1 (3–0 Pac-10)	Pauley Pavilion; Los Angeles, California
January 14; 7:00 pm, no	No. 2	Washington State	W 80–43	14–1 (4–0 Pac-10)	Maples Pavilion; Stanford, California
January 16; 2:00 pm, no	No. 2	Washington	W 66–51	15–1 (5–0 Pac-10)	Maples Pavilion; Stanford, California
January 21; 7:00 pm, no	No. 2	at Oregon State	W 63–47	16–1 (6–0 Pac-10)	Gill Coliseum; Corvallis, Oregon
January 23; 11:30 am, no	No. 2	at Oregon	W 100–80	17–1 (7–0 Pac-10)	McArthur Court; Eugene, Oregon
January 28; 7:00 pm, no	No. 2	Arizona State	W 71–48	18–1 (8–0 Pac-10)	Maples Pavilion; Stanford, California
January 30; 2:00 pm, no	No. 2	Arizona	W 82–63	19–1 (9–0 Pac-10)	Maples Pavilion; Stanford, California
February 4; 7:00 pm, no	No. 2	UCLA	W 74–53	20–1 (10–0 Pac-10)	Maples Pavilion; Stanford, California
February 7; 1:00 pm, no	No. 2	USC	W 77–39	21–1 (11–0 Pac-10)	Maples Pavilion; Stanford, California
February 12; 7:00 pm, no	No. 2	at Washington	W 58–36	22–1 (12–0 Pac-10)	Bank of America Arena; Seattle, Washington
February 14; 12:00 pm, no	No. 2	at Washington State	W 98–67	23–1 (13–0 Pac-10)	Beasley Coliseum; Pullman, Washington
February 18; 7:00 pm, no	No. 2	Oregon	W 104–60	24–1 (14–0 Pac-10)	Maples Pavilion; Stanford, California
February 20; 8:00 pm, no	No. 2	Oregon State	W 82–48	25–1 (15–0 Pac-10)	Maples Pavilion; Stanford, California
February 25; 6:00 pm, no	No. 2	at Arizona State	W 62–43	26–1 (16–0 Pac-10)	Wells Fargo Arena; Tempe, Arizona
February 27; 2:00 pm, no	No. 2	at Arizona	W 75–48	27–1 (17–0 Pac-10)	McKale Center; Tucson, Arizona
March 6; 12:30 pm, no	No. 2	at California	W 63–48	28–1 (18–0 Pac-10)	Haas Pavilion; Berkeley, California
*Non-conference game. ^{#}Rankings from AP Poll. (#) Tournament seedings in parentheses. All times are in Pacific Time.

== Postseason ==
=== Pac-10 Basketball Tournament ===
Date time, TV	Rank^{#}	Opponent^{#}	Result	Record	Site city, state
Pacific-10 Conference tournament
March 12; 1:15 pm, no	No. 2	vs. Arizona	W 72–52	29–1	Galen Center; Los Angeles, California
March 13; 2:30 pm, no	No. 2	vs. California	W 64–44	30–1	Galen Center; Los Angeles, California
March 14; 3:00 pm, no	No. 2	vs. No. 23 UCLA	W 70–46	31–1	Galen Center; Los Angeles, California
*Non-conference game. ^{#}Rankings from AP Poll. (#) Tournament seedings in parentheses. All times are in Pacific Time.

=== NCAA basketball tournament ===
Date time, TV	Rank^{#}	Opponent^{#}	Result	Record	Site city, state
NCAA tournament
March 20*; 7:30 pm, no	No. 2	vs. UC Riverside; First round	W 79–47	32–1	Maples Pavilion; Stanford, California
March 22*; 6:30 pm, no	No. 2	vs. #8 Iowa; Second Round	W 96–67	33–1	Maples Pavilion; Stanford, California
March 27*; 6:00 pm, no	No. 2	vs. #5 Georgia; Regional semifinals - Sweet Sixteen	W 73–36	34–1	Arco Arena; Sacramento, California
March 29*; 6:00 pm, no	No. 2	vs. Xavier; Regional final - Elite Eight	W 55–53	35–1	Arco Arena; Sacramento, California
April 4*; 4:00 pm, no	No. 2	vs. #12 Oklahoma; Semifinals - Final Four	W 73–66	36–1	Alamodome; San Antonio, Texas
April 6*; 5:30 pm, no	No. 2	vs. No. 1 Connecticut; Championship	L 47-53	36–2	Alamodome; San Antonio, Texas
*Non-conference game. ^{#}Rankings from AP Poll. (#) Tournament seedings in parentheses. All times are in Pacific Time.

== Team players drafted into the WNBA ==
Round	Pick	Player	WNBA club
1	5	Jayne Appel	San Antonio Silver Stars

== See also ==
- 2009–10 NCAA Division I women's basketball season
