= Washington basketball team =

Washington basketball team may refer to

== Teams based in Washington, DC ==
- Washington Mystics, a Women's National Basketball Association (WNBA) team
- Washington Wizards, a National Basketball Association (NBA) team
- Washington Caps, a former American Basketball Association team (1969–1970)
- Washington Capitols, a former Basketball Association of America team (1946–1951)
- Capital City Go-Go, an NBA G League team
- Washington Generals, show team which plays exhibition games against the Harlem Globetrotters

=== University teams ===
Representing George Washington University, Washington, D.C.

- George Washington Revolutionaries men's basketball
- George Washington Revolutionaries women's basketball

Representing Georgetown University, Washington, D.C.

- Georgetown Hoyas men's basketball, team of Georgetown University in Washington, D.C.
- Georgetown Hoyas women's basketball, team of Georgetown University in Washington, D.C.

== Teams based in Washington State ==
- Seattle Storm, a WNBA team
- Seattle SuperSonics, a former NBA team (1967–2008)

=== University teams ===
Representing the University of Washington, Seattle

- Washington Huskies men's basketball
- Washington Huskies women's basketball

Representing Washington State University, Pullman

- Washington State Cougars men's basketball
- Washington State Cougars women's basketball

Representing Central Washington University, Ellensburg

- Central Washington Wildcats

Representing Eastern Washington University, Cheney

- Eastern Washington Eagles men's basketball
- Eastern Washington Eagles women's basketball

Representing Gonzaga University, Spokane

- Gonzaga Bulldogs men's basketball
- Gonzaga Bulldogs women's basketball

Representing Saint Martin's University, Lacey

- Saint Martin's Saints

Representing Seattle Pacific University, Seattle

- Seattle Pacific Falcons

Representing Seattle University, Seattle

- Seattle Redhawks men's basketball
- Seattle Redhawks women's basketball

Representing the University of Puget Sound, Tacoma

- Puget Sound Loggers

Representing Western Washington University, Bellington

- Western Washington Vikings § Basketball

Representing Whitman College, Walla Walla

- Whitman Blues

Representing Whitworth University, Spokane

- Whitworth Pirates

== Teams based in other places ==
- Washington University Bears, men's and women's basketball teams of Washington University in St. Louis in Missouri

== See also ==
- Sports in Washington
