= 2009–10 Arizona Wildcats women's basketball team =

Intercollegiate basketball season

2009–10 Arizona Wildcats women's basketball
- Conference: Pacific-10 Conference
- Record: 9-10 (3-6 Pac-10)
- Head coach: Niya Butts
- Assistant coaches: Sue Darling; Chance Lindley; Brandy Manning

2009–10 Pacific-10 Conference women's basketball standings
| | Conf. | | | | Overall |
| Team | W | | L | PCT | W | | L | PCT |
|---|---|---|---|---|---|---|---|---|
| No. 2 Stanford † | 18 | – | 0 | 1.000 | 36 | – | 2 | .947 |
| No. 23 UCLA | 15 | – | 3 | .833 | 25 | – | 9 | .735 |
| USC | 12 | – | 6 | .667 | 19 | – | 12 | .613 |
| California | 11 | – | 7 | .611 | 24 | – | 13 | .649 |
| Arizona State | 9 | – | 9 | .500 | 18 | – | 14 | .563 |
| Oregon | 7 | – | 11 | .389 | 18 | – | 16 | .529 |
| Washington | 7 | – | 11 | .389 | 13 | – | 18 | .419 |
| Arizona | 6 | – | 12 | .333 | 14 | – | 17 | .452 |
| Washington State | 3 | – | 15 | .167 | 8 | – | 22 | .267 |
| Oregon State | 2 | – | 16 | .111 | 11 | – | 20 | .355 |
† 2010 Pacific-10 Tournament winner As of April 6, 2010; Rankings from AP Poll

== Offseason ==
- August 21: The 2009-10 preseason candidates list for the Women’s Wooden Award was released, naming 31 student athletes. Ify Ibekwe from Arizona was one of the candidates.

== Regular season ==
The Wildcats will compete in the Iona College Tip-Off Tournament from November 14–15. In addition, the Wildcats will participate in the JHG Jam on November 21.

=== Roster ===
| Number | Name | Position | Height | Class |
|---|---|---|---|---|
| 5 | Shanita Arnold | Guard | 5-5 | RS JR |
| 13 | Tasha Dickey | Guard | 5-10 | RS SO |
| 11 | Ashley Frazier | Guard | 5-6 | SR |
| 10 | Faihza Hill | Guard | 5-5 | JR |
| 3 | Ify Ibekwe | Forward | 6-2 | JR |
| 12 | Brooke Jackson | Guard | 5-8 | SO |
| 1 | Jennifer Kioa | Center | 6-4 | JR |
| 53 | Soana Lucet | Forward | 6-1 | JR |
| 42 | Amanda Pierson | Forward/Center | 6-3 | JR |
| 25 | Reiko Thomas | Guard | 5-8 | SO |
| 0 | Davellyn Whyte | Guard | 5-10 | FR |

=== Schedule ===
| Date | Opponent | Location | Time | Score |
|---|---|---|---|---|
| 11/05/09 | vs. Fort Lewis | Tucson, Ariz. | 7:00 p.m. MST | W 75-60 |
| 11/08/09 | vs. Grand Canyon | Tucson, Ariz. | 1:00 p.m. MST | W 83-56 |
| 11/14/09 | at Iona | New Rochelle, N.Y. | 7:30 p.m. ET | W 75-70 |
| 11/15/09 | Bucknell or Miami (OH) | New Rochelle, N.Y. | 1:00 p.m. ET | W 91-67 |
| 11/21/09 | at San Diego State | San Diego, Calif. | 6:30 p.m. PT | L 38-57 |
| 11/23/09 | vs. Mississippi | Tucson, Ariz. | 11:00 a.m. MST | W 65-59 |
| 11/27/09 | at San Diego | San Diego, Calif. | 7:00 p.m. PT | W 65-55 |
| 12/04/09 | vs. Nevada | Tucson, Ariz. | 7:00 p.m. MST | |
| 12/09/09 | vs. New Mexico | Tucson, Ariz. | 6:00 p.m. MST | |
| 12/20/09 | at Georgia Tech | Atlanta, Ga. | 1:00 p.m. ET | |
| 12/23/09 | at UC Riverside | Riverside, Calif. | 1:00 p.m. PT | |
| 12/29/09 | vs. Alabama A&M | Tucson, Ariz. | 7:00 p.m. MST | |
| 01/01/10 | vs. UCLA | Tucson, Ariz. | 2:00 p.m. MST | |
| 01/03/10 | vs. USC | Tucson, Ariz. | 2:00 p.m. MST | |
| 01/07/10 | at Washington State | Pullman, Wash. | 6:00 p.m. PT | |
| 01/09/10 | at Washington | Seattle, Wash. | 2:00 p.m. PT | |
| 01/14/10 | vs. Oregon State | Tucson, Ariz. | 7:00 p.m. MST | |
| 01/16/10 | vs. Oregon | Tucson, Ariz. | 2:00 p.m. MST | |
| 01/24/10 | vs. Arizona State | Tucson, Ariz. | 4:00 p.m. MST | |
| 01/28/10 | at California | Berkeley, Calif. | 7:00 p.m. PT | |
| 01/30/10 | at Stanford | Palo Alto, Calif. | TBA | L 83-62 |
| 02/04/10 | vs. Washington State | Tucson, Ariz. | 7:00 p.m. MST | |
| 02/06/10 | vs. Washington | Tucson, Ariz. | 2:00 p.m. MST | |
| 02/11/10 | at Oregon | Eugene, Ore. | 7:00 p.m. PT | |
| 02/13/10 | at Oregon State | Corvallis, Ore. | 7:00 p.m. PT | |
| 02/16/10 | vs. Cal St | ate Northridge | Tucson, Ariz. | 7:00 p.m. PT |
| 02/20/10 | at Arizona State | Tempe, Ariz. | 9:00 p.m. MST | |
| 02/25/10 | vs. California | Tucson, Ariz. | 7:00 p.m. MST | |
| 02/27/10 | vs. Stanford | Tucson, Ariz. | 3:00 p.m. MST | |
| 03/04/10 | at USC | Los Angeles, Calif. | TBA | |
| 03/06/10 | at UCLA | Los Angeles, Calif. | 12:30 p.m. PT | |

== Post Season ==
=== Pac-10 Basketball tournament ===
- See 2010 Pacific-10 Conference women's basketball tournament

== See also ==
- 2009–10 NCAA Division I women's basketball season
