= 2009–10 Arizona State Sun Devils women's basketball team =

Intercollegiate basketball season

2009–10 Arizona State Sun Devils women's basketball

Rainbow Wahine Classic champions
- Conference: Pacific-10 Conference
- Record: 4-1 (0-0 Pac-10)
- Head coach: Charli Turner Thorne
- Assistant coaches: Joseph Anders; Meg Sanders; Laura Hughes
- Home arena: Wells Fargo Arena

2009–10 Pacific-10 Conference women's basketball standings
| | Conf. | | | | Overall |
| Team | W | | L | PCT | W | | L | PCT |
|---|---|---|---|---|---|---|---|---|
| No. 2 Stanford † | 18 | – | 0 | 1.000 | 36 | – | 2 | .947 |
| No. 23 UCLA | 15 | – | 3 | .833 | 25 | – | 9 | .735 |
| USC | 12 | – | 6 | .667 | 19 | – | 12 | .613 |
| California | 11 | – | 7 | .611 | 24 | – | 13 | .649 |
| Arizona State | 9 | – | 9 | .500 | 18 | – | 14 | .563 |
| Oregon | 7 | – | 11 | .389 | 18 | – | 16 | .529 |
| Washington | 7 | – | 11 | .389 | 13 | – | 18 | .419 |
| Arizona | 6 | – | 12 | .333 | 14 | – | 17 | .452 |
| Washington State | 3 | – | 15 | .167 | 8 | – | 22 | .267 |
| Oregon State | 2 | – | 16 | .111 | 11 | – | 20 | .355 |
† 2010 Pacific-10 Tournament winner As of April 6, 2010; Rankings from AP Poll

The 2009–10 Arizona State Sun Devils women's basketball team represented Arizona State University in the 2009–10 NCAA Division I women's basketball season. The Sun Devils were coached by Charli Turner Thorne. The Sun Devils were a member of the Pacific-10 Conference.

== Offseason ==
- April 17, 2009: Sabrina McKinney and Tenaya Watson have signed national letters of intent to study and play basketball at Arizona State. Both will join the Sun Devils for the 2009-10 season.

McKinney will be coming to ASU from Bowie High School in Arlington, Texas She was a two-time District 4-5A Defensive Player of the Year. A four-year starter, McKinney led her team in both assists and steals three straight seasons. Watson A 5-9 guard from Long Beach, California. She previously played at Central Arizona College where she played a major role in leading her team to a perfect 35-0 season and the NJCAA championship. She put up All-American numbers as she averaged 13.8 points, 5.4 assists (13th in the nation) and 3.9 steals (fourth in the nation) per game. She was named the MVP of the NJCAA Tournament after averaging 16.8 points in the Vaqueras' four tournament games.

- April 30: Head coach Charli Turner Thorne will serve as head coach of the 2009 USA Basketball Women's World University Games Team. Suzy Merchant of Michigan State University and Julie Rousseau of Pepperdine University will serve as assistant coaches.

== Preseason ==
| Date | Location | Opponent | Score | Record |
|---|---|---|---|---|
| Nov. 5 | Tempe, AZ | Vanguard | 97-64 | 1-0 |

== Regular season ==
- The Sun Devils participated in the Rainbow Wahine Classic in Hawaii from November 27–28. On December 4, the club will host the ASU Classic. Before the end of December, the Sun Devils will participate in the Desert Sun Classic in Las Vegas.

=== Roster ===
| Number | Name | Height | Position | Class |
|---|---|---|---|---|
| 42 | Kali Bennett | 1.96 m (6 ft 5 in) | Center | Junior |
| 25 | Kimberly Brandon | 1.88 m (6 ft 2 in) | Guard/Forward | Sophomore |
| 24 | Jazlyn Davis | 1.75 m (5 ft 9 in) | Guard | Senior |
| 12 | Alex Earl | 1.78 m (5 ft 10 in) | Guard | Sophomore |
| 30 | Gabby Fage | 1.8 m (5 ft 11 in) | Guard | Senior |
| 22 | Janae Fulcher | 1.91 m (6 ft 3 in) | Forward | Sophomore |
| 21 | Kayli Murphy | 1.88 m (6 ft 2 in) | Forward/Center | Senior |
| 13 | Danielle Orsillo | 1.75 m (5 ft 9 in) | Guard | Junior |
| 4 | Haley Parsons | 1.65 m (5 ft 5 in) | Guard | Sophomore |
| 1 | Dymond Simon | 1.65 m (5 ft 5 in) | Guard | Senior |
| 32 | Becca Tobin | 1.93 m (6 ft 4 in) | Forward | Junior |

=== Schedule ===
| Date | Location | Opponent | Score | Record |
|---|---|---|---|---|
| Nov. 15 | Tempe, AZ | South Dakota State | 73-64 | 1-0 |
| Nov. 19 | New Haven, CT | Yale | 82-46 | 2-0 |
| Nov. 21 | Cincinnati | Xavier | 46-59 | 2-1 |
| Nov. 27 | Honolulu | Hawaii | 65-53 | 3-1 |
| Nov. 28 | Honolulu | ETSU | 80-67 | 4-1 |
| Dec. 4 | Tempe, AZ | Idaho State | | |
| Dec. 5 | Tempe, AZ | Pepperdine or Utah State | | |
| Dec. 9 | Tempe, AZ | North Dakota | | |
| Dec. 19 | Las Vegas | Texas A&M | | |
| Dec. 20 | Las Vegas | Baylor | | |
| Dec. 28 | Tempe, AZ | Furman | | |
| Jan. 1 | Tempe, AZ | USC | | |
| Jan. 3 | Tempe, AZ | UCLA | | |
| Jan. 7 | Seattle, WA | Washington | | |
| Jan. 9 | Pullman, WA | Washington State | | |
| Jan. 14 | Tempe, AZ | Oregon | | |
| Jan. 16 | Tempe, AZ | Oregon State | | |

== Player stats ==
| Player | Games Played | Minutes | Field goals | Three Pointers | Free Throws | Rebounds | Assists | Blocks | Steals | Points |

== Postseason ==
=== Pac-10 Basketball tournament ===
- See 2010 Pacific-10 Conference women's basketball tournament

== Team players drafted into the WNBA ==
| Round | Pick | Player | WNBA club |

== See also ==
- 2009-10 Arizona State Sun Devils men's basketball team
- 2009–10 NCAA Division I women's basketball season
