= 2009–10 Oregon Ducks women's basketball team =

Intercollegiate basketball season

2009–10 Oregon Ducks women's basketball
- Conference: Pacific-10 Conference
- Record: 16–14 (7–11 Pac-10)
- Head coach: Paul Westhead (1st season)
- Assistant coaches: Dan Muscatell; Kai Felton; Keila Whittington

2009–10 Pacific-10 Conference women's basketball standings
	Conf.				Overall
Team	W		L	PCT	W		L	PCT
No. 2 Stanford †	18	–	0	1.000	36	–	2	.947
No. 23 UCLA	15	–	3	.833	25	–	9	.735
USC	12	–	6	.667	19	–	12	.613
California	11	–	7	.611	24	–	13	.649
Arizona State	9	–	9	.500	18	–	14	.563
Oregon	7	–	11	.389	18	–	16	.529
Washington	7	–	11	.389	13	–	18	.419
Arizona	6	–	12	.333	14	–	17	.452
Washington State	3	–	15	.167	8	–	22	.267
Oregon State	2	–	16	.111	11	–	20	.355
† 2010 Pacific-10 Tournament winner As of April 6, 2010; Rankings from AP Poll

The 2009–10 Oregon Ducks women's basketball team represented the University of Oregon in the 2009–10 NCAA Division I women's basketball season. The Ducks were coached by Paul Westhead. The Ducks were a member of the Pacific-10 Conference.

== Offseason ==
- April 14: Two additions were made to the Oregon Ducks coaching staff. Keila Whittington and Kai Felton will assist head coach Paul Westhead. Whittington was previously at Marist College, while Felton was at the University of Southern California.
- April 20: Former Ducks assistant coach Dan Muscatell will return to the Ducks. For the past six seasons, he was head coach at Sacramento State. In his six seasons with Sacramento State, his Big Sky Conference record was 36 wins and 21 losses.
- May 8: Kristi Fallin, the reigning Northwest Athletic Association of Community College Southern Region Player of the Year, signed a letter of intent to play with the Oregon Ducks. Fallin led the NWAACC with an average of 23 points per game.
- May 14: Janell Bergstrom was hired as the team’s Director of Basketball Operations. Bergstrom was a four-time letter winner on the Oregon softball team from 2000 to 2003 and previously worked as the Ducks special assistant to the Executive Senior Athletic Administration.
- May 15: It was announced that sophomore forward Eilie Manou and freshman guard Darriel Gaynor have each left the Oregon women’s program. Manou played two seasons for the Ducks and averaged 7.6 points and 5.1 rebounds per game. She played in 57 games and started 34 of them. Gaynor appeared in 26 games and averaged 1.3 points and 1.0 rebounds per game.

== Preseason ==
Date	Location	Opponent	Score	Record
Nov. 3				1-0
Nov. 8				2-0

== Regular season ==
=== Roster ===
Number	Name	Height	Position	Class

=== Schedule ===
Date	Location	Opponent	Score	Leading Scorer	Record
Nov. 16	Eugene, OR	Eastern Washington	86-48	Taylor Lilley (28)	1-0
Nov. 22	Missoula, Montana	Montana	86-81		2-0
Nov. 24	Eugene, OR	Santa Clara	88-71		3-0
Nov. 27	Eugene, OR	Cal State Fullerton	117-69		4-0
Nov. 28	Eugene, OR				
Nov. 29	Eugene, OR				
Dec.					
Dec.					
Dec.					
Dec.					
Dec.					
Dec.					
Jan. 1	Eugene, OR	Washington			
Mar. 5		Washington St.	L 67–53		16–13 (7–10)
Mar. 5		Washington	L 62–53		16–14 (7–11)

== Player stats ==
Player	Games played	Minutes	Field goals	Three pointers	Free throws	Rebounds	Assists	Blocks	Steals	Points

== Postseason ==
=== Pac-10 Basketball tournament ===
- See 2010 Pacific-10 Conference women's basketball tournament

== Team players drafted into the WNBA ==
Round	Pick	Player	NBA club
