= 2009–10 California Golden Bears women's basketball team =

Intercollegiate basketball season

2009–10 California Golden Bears women's basketball

National Invitation Tournament champions
- Conference: Pacific-10 Conference
- Record: 22-13 (11-7 Pac-10)
- Head coach: Joanne Boyle
- Assistant coaches: Charmin Smith; Jennifer Hoover; Kevin Morrison
- Home arena: Haas Pavilion

2009–10 Pacific-10 Conference women's basketball standings
	Conf.				Overall
Team	W		L	PCT	W		L	PCT
No. 2 Stanford †	18	–	0	1.000	36	–	2	.947
No. 23 UCLA	15	–	3	.833	25	–	9	.735
USC	12	–	6	.667	19	–	12	.613
California	11	–	7	.611	24	–	13	.649
Arizona State	9	–	9	.500	18	–	14	.563
Oregon	7	–	11	.389	18	–	16	.529
Washington	7	–	11	.389	13	–	18	.419
Arizona	6	–	12	.333	14	–	17	.452
Washington State	3	–	15	.167	8	–	22	.267
Oregon State	2	–	16	.111	11	–	20	.355
† 2010 Pacific-10 Tournament winner As of April 6, 2010; Rankings from AP Poll

The 2009–10 California Golden Bears women's basketball team represented University of California, Berkeley in the 2009–10 NCAA Division I basketball season. The team played in the Pacific-10 Conference. Under fifth-year head coach Joanne Boyle, the Golden Bears won their first WNIT championship, claiming their first postseason championship title.

== Offseason ==
- April 2:USA Basketball announced that its board of directors has approved USA Basketball committees for 2009–2012. Joanne Boyle has been appointed among its members. The committee is responsible for selecting coaches and athletes for USA Basketball college-aged competitions including the U19 FIBA World Championships. Other members include NCAA chairwoman Sue Donohoe (Vice President for Division I Women's Basketball), Coquese Washington from Penn State University and Connie Yori from the University of Nebraska, along with Beth Cunningham from Virginia Commonwealth University.
- May 18: USA Basketball announced 14 finalists for the 2009 USA Women's World University Games Team and 14 finalists for the Under-19 teams. California Golden Bears guard Alexis Gray-Lawson and incoming freshman Layshia Calrendon were among the finalists. Gray-Lawson is trying to earn a spot on the World University Games team while Clarendon is aiming trying for the Under-19 team.
- July 30: The Women's Basketball Coaches Association (WBCA), on behalf of the Wade Coalition, announced the 2009-2010 preseason "Wade Watch" list for The State Farm Wade Trophy Division I Player of the Year. Golden Bear senior guard Alexis Gray-Lawson has been named to the 2009-10 preseason "Wade Watch" list, which is made up of top NCAA Division I student-athletes who best embody the spirit of Lily Margaret Wade. This is based on the following criteria: game and season statistics, leadership, character, effect on their team and overall playing ability.
- August 21: The 2009-10 preseason candidates list for the Women's Wooden Award was released, naming 31 student athletes. Alexis Gray-Lawson from California was one of the candidates.

== Postseason ==
=== WNIT Tournament ===
- Wednesday, March 17 – California def. UC Davis 74-69 (OT), Haas Pavilion, Berkeley, Calif. (first round)
- Tuesday, March 23 – California 64, Utah 54, Haas Pavilion, Berkeley, Calif. (second round)
- Thursday, March 25 – California 71, Oregon 57, Eugene, Oregon (Regional)
- Saturday, March 27 – California 76, BYU, 50, Haas Pavilion, Berkeley, Calif. (quarterfinals)
- Thursday, April 1 – California 61, Illinois State 45, Normal, Ill. (WNIT Semifinals)
- Saturday, April 3 – California 73, Miami 61, Haas Pavilion, Berkeley, Calif. (WNIT Championship)

=== Pac-10 Basketball tournament ===
- See 2010 Pacific-10 Conference women's basketball tournament

== Team players drafted into the WNBA ==
Round	Pick	Player	WNBA club
3rd	30th overall	Alexis Gray-Lawson	Washington Mystics
