= 2009–10 Oregon State Beavers women's basketball team =

Intercollegiate basketball season

2009–10 Oregon State Beavers women's basketball
- Conference: Pacific-10 Conference
- Record: 11–20 (2–16 Pac-10)
- Head coach: LaVonda Wagner
- Assistant coaches: Kellee Barney; Krista Reinking; Anthony Turner
- Home arena: Gill Coliseum

2009–10 Pacific-10 Conference women's basketball standings
	Conf.				Overall
Team	W		L	PCT	W		L	PCT
No. 2 Stanford †	18	–	0	1.000	36	–	2	.947
No. 23 UCLA	15	–	3	.833	25	–	9	.735
USC	12	–	6	.667	19	–	12	.613
California	11	–	7	.611	24	–	13	.649
Arizona State	9	–	9	.500	18	–	14	.563
Oregon	7	–	11	.389	18	–	16	.529
Washington	7	–	11	.389	13	–	18	.419
Arizona	6	–	12	.333	14	–	17	.452
Washington State	3	–	15	.167	8	–	22	.267
Oregon State	2	–	16	.111	11	–	20	.355
† 2010 Pacific-10 Tournament winner As of April 6, 2010; Rankings from AP Poll

The 2009–10 Oregon State Beavers women's basketball team represented Oregon State University in the 2009–10 NCAA Division I basketball season. The Beavers were coached by LaVonda Wagner. The Beavers, a member of the Pacific-10 Conference, finished last in the conference and did not qualify for any national postseason tournament.

== Offseason ==
https://archive.today/20130216150210/http://www.osubeavers.com/sports/w-gym/spec-rel/050709aaa.html

- May 7:The 11th annual Bennys, a celebration to commemorate this year's achievements of student-athletes, is scheduled for Tues., June 2 at the LaSells Stewart Center (across from Reser Stadium). The awards ceremony starts at 7 p.m..
- May 18:Members of the Oregon State women's basketball team participated in the Relay For Life, an annual event held across the nation to benefit the American Cancer Society.

== Postseason ==
=== Pac-10 Basketball tournament ===
- See 2010 Pacific-10 Conference women's basketball tournament
