= 2009–10 USC Trojans women's basketball team =

Intercollegiate basketball season

2009–10 USC Trojans women's basketball
- Conference: Pacific-10 Conference
- Record: 18–11 (12–6 Pac-10)
- Head coach: Michael Cooper
- Assistant coach: Ervin Monier
- Home arena: Galen Center

2009–10 Pacific-10 Conference women's basketball standings
	Conf.				Overall
Team	W		L	PCT	W		L	PCT
No. 2 Stanford †	18	–	0	1.000	36	–	2	.947
No. 23 UCLA	15	–	3	.833	25	–	9	.735
USC	12	–	6	.667	19	–	12	.613
California	11	–	7	.611	24	–	13	.649
Arizona State	9	–	9	.500	18	–	14	.563
Oregon	7	–	11	.389	18	–	16	.529
Washington	7	–	11	.389	13	–	18	.419
Arizona	6	–	12	.333	14	–	17	.452
Washington State	3	–	15	.167	8	–	22	.267
Oregon State	2	–	16	.111	11	–	20	.355
† 2010 Pacific-10 Tournament winner As of April 6, 2010; Rankings from AP Poll

The 2009–10 USC Trojans women's basketball team represented the University of Southern California in the 2009–10 NCAA Division I women's basketball season. The Trojans were coached by Michael Cooper. The Trojans were a member of the Pacific-10 Conference.

== Offseason ==
- April 8: Head coach Mark Trakh resigned after guiding the Women of Troy for 5 seasons. Trakh had a 90–64 (.584) record. The Women of Troy won 20 games in 2005 and then 19 in 2006 as both advanced to the second round of the NCAA tourney. Four of his teams made it to the semifinals of the Pac-10 Tournament and had an 8–3 mark against crosstown rival UCLA. His players made various All-Pac-10 teams 20 times and Pac-10 All-Academics squads 14 times. He signed Top 10 recruiting classes the past 4 seasons, including the nation's No. 1 group in 2006, and 7 of his signees were named McDonald's All-Americans. This past season, the Women of Troy went 17–15 overall, tied for fourth in the Pac-10 with a 9–9 mark and made it to the Pac-10 Tournament final for the first time in history before losing to eventual NCAA Final Four participant Stanford.
- April 9: USC senior point guard Camille LeNoir was selected in the second-round of the 2009 WNBA draft. She was chosen by the Washington Mystics as the 23rd pick overall. LeNoir becomes the eighth Trojan to be selected in the WNBA Draf.
- May 1: Los Angeles Sparks head coach and former Los Angeles Lakers great Michael Cooper has been named head coach of the USC women's basketball team, effective at the completion of the Sparks' 2009 season. Joining Cooper's USC staff will be long-time collegiate and high school assistant Ervin Monier, who will oversee the program as associate head coach until Cooper's arrival.
- May 4: The Women of Troy will participate in the 2009 US Virgin Islands Paradise Jam at the University of Virgin Islands. The event is celebrating its tenth anniversary. Games will be played at UVI's Sports and Fitness Center, the Caribbean's premier basketball facility located in Charlotte Amalie, St. Thomas.
- June 9:USC guard Jacki Gemelos has had her playing career delayed to a knee injury. Already the victim of three ligament tears that have kept her out of action for her first three seasons at USC, Gemelos has suffered another setback when she recently had surgery to replace the ACL graft in her left knee. Gemelos is expected to be sidelined from competition until January 2010.

== Season summary ==
- January 21, 2010 – Pacific-10 Conference issued a public reprimand to Michael Cooper for his post-game comments following USC's game with UCLA on Sunday, January 17.

=== Games ===
Date time, TV	Rank^{#}	Opponent^{#}	Result	Record	Site city, state
Non-conference regular season Schedule
November 13*; 1:30 pm, no		No. 11 Xavier	L 71–81 ^{OT}	0–1	Galen Center; Los Angeles, California
November 15*; 5:30 pm, no		Fresno State	W 68–63	1–1	Galen Center; Los Angeles, California
November 19*; 6:00 pm, no		at Gonzaga	L 58–70	1–2	McCarthey Athletic Center; Spokane, Washington
November 26*; 4:00 pm, no		vs. Rutgers; Paradise Jam	L 51–66	1–3	Sports and Fitness Center; Saint Thomas, U.S. Virgin Islands
November 27*; 6:30 pm, no		vs. No. 13 Texas; Paradise Jam	W 61–54	2–3	Sports and Fitness Center; Saint Thomas, U.S. Virgin Islands
November 28*; 2:45 pm, no		vs. No. 19 Mississippi State; Paradise Jam	W 64–60	3–3	Sports and Fitness Center; Saint Thomas, U.S. Virgin Islands
December 3*; 7:00 pm, no		at Long Beach State	W 83–77	4–3	Walter Pyramid; Long Beach, California
December 6*; 11:00 am, no		at No. 11 Duke	L 72–78	4–4	Cameron Indoor Stadium; Durham, North Carolina
December 19*; 4:30 pm, no		Dartmouth	W 78–46	5–4	Galen Center; Los Angeles, California
December 20*; 5:30 pm, no		Cal State Bakersfield	W 93–56	6–4	Galen Center; Los Angeles, California
December 30*; 6:00 pm, no		North Carolina State	L 53–59	6–5	Galen Center; Los Angeles, California
Pacific-10 Conference Regular Season Schedule
January 1; 1:00 pm, no		at Arizona State	W 60–56	7–5 (1–0 Pac-10)	Wells Fargo Arena; Tempe, Arizona
January 3; 1:00 pm, no		at Arizona	W 81–78 ^{OT}	8–5 (2–0 Pac-10)	McKale Center; Tucson, Arizona
January 8; 7:00 pm, no		No. 2 Stanford	L 62–82	8–6 (2–1 Pac-10)	Galen Center; Los Angeles, California
January 10; 3:00 pm, no		California	W 67–64	9–6 (3–1 Pac-10)	Galen Center; Los Angeles, California
January 17; 2:30 pm, no		UCLA	W 70–63	10–6 (4–1 Pac-10)	Galen Center; Los Angeles, California
January 21; 7:00 pm, no		at Washington	W 69–65	11–6 (5–1 Pac-10)	Bank of America Arena; Seattle, Washington
January 23; 2:00 pm, no		at Washington State	W 61–51	12–6 (6–1 Pac-10)	Beasley Coliseum; Pullman, Washington
January 28; 7:00 pm, no		Oregon State	W 61–34	13–6 (7–1 Pac-10)	Galen Center; Los Angeles, California
January 30; 2:30 pm, no		Oregon	L 77–85	13–7 (7–2 Pac-10)	Galen Center; Los Angeles, California
February 4; 7:00 pm, no		at California	L 55–61	13–8 (7–3 Pac-10)	Haas Pavilion; Berkeley, California
February 7; 1:00 pm, no		at No. 2 Stanford	L 39–77	13–9 (7–4 Pac-10)	Maples Pavilion; Stanford, California
February 13; 11:00 am, no		at UCLA	L 56–74	13–10 (7–5 Pac-10)	Pauley Pavilion; Los Angeles, California
February 18; 7:00 pm, no		Washington State	L 52–64	13–11 (7–6 Pac-10)	Galen Center; Los Angeles, California
February 20; 8:00 pm, no		Washington	W 56–51	14–11 (8–6 Pac-10)	Galen Center; Los Angeles, California
February 25; 7:00 pm, no		at Oregon	W 87–84	15–11 (9–6 Pac-10)	McArthur Court; Eugene, Oregon
February 27; 2:00 pm, no		at Oregon State	W 53–50	16–11 (10–6 Pac-10)	Gill Coliseum; Corvallis, Oregon
March 4; 7:00 pm, no		Arizona State	W 55–53	17–11 (11–6 Pac-10)	Galen Center; Los Angeles, California
March 6; 12:30 pm, no		Arizona	W 62–52	18–11 (12–6 Pac-10)	Galen Center; Los Angeles, California
*Non-conference game. ^{#}Rankings from AP Poll. (#) Tournament seedings in parentheses. All times are in Pacific Time.

== Postseason ==
=== Pac-10 Basketball tournament ===
- See 2010 Pacific-10 Conference women's basketball tournament

== See also ==
- 2009-10 USC Trojans men's basketball team
