= 2010 Pacific-10 Conference women's basketball tournament =

- Classification: Division I
- Season: 2009–10
- Teams: 10
- Site: Galen Center; Los Angeles, California
- Champions: Stanford Cardinal (19th title)
- Winning coach: Tara VanDerveer (19th title)
- MVP: Nnemkadi Ogwumike (Stanford)
- Television: FSN
- Pacific-10 Conference women's basketball tournaments

2009–10 Pacific-10 Conference women's basketball standings
	Conf.				Overall
Team	W		L	PCT	W		L	PCT
No. 2 Stanford †	18	–	0	1.000	36	–	2	.947
No. 23 UCLA	15	–	3	.833	25	–	9	.735
USC	12	–	6	.667	19	–	12	.613
California	11	–	7	.611	24	–	13	.649
Arizona State	9	–	9	.500	18	–	14	.563
Oregon	7	–	11	.389	18	–	16	.529
Washington	7	–	11	.389	13	–	18	.419
Arizona	6	–	12	.333	14	–	17	.452
Washington State	3	–	15	.167	8	–	22	.267
Oregon State	2	–	16	.111	11	–	20	.355
† 2010 Pacific-10 Tournament winner As of April 6, 2010; Rankings from AP Poll

The 2010 State Farm Pacific-10 Conference Women's Basketball Tournament was a post-season tournament for the women's basketball teams in the Pacific-10 Conference. The games were held on Thursday through Sunday, March 11–14, at the Galen Center (Los Angeles, California). Stanford was the tournament champion and became the NCAA tournament automatic qualifier, having beaten UCLA in the championship game.

== Schedule ==
Date	Game	Matchup	Winner	Score	Time	TV
Thu., Mar. 11	1	#8 Seed (Arizona) vs. #9 Seed (Washington State)	Arizona	62–60	6:00 PM	
Thu., Mar. 11	2	#7 Seed (Washington) vs. #10 Seed (Oregon St.)	Oregon State	52–42	8:15 PM	
Fri., Mar. 12	3	Seed #4 (California) vs. Seed #5 (Arizona State)	California	60–50	11:00 AM	
Fri., Mar. 12	4	Seed #1 (No. 2 Stanford) vs. #8/#9 Winner (Arizona)	Stanford	72–52	1:15 PM	
Fri., Mar. 12	5	Seed #3 (USC) vs. Seed #6 (Oregon)	USC	80–76	5:00 PM	
Fri., Mar. 12	6	Seed #2 (No. 23 UCLA) vs. #7/#10 Winner (Oregon State)	UCLA	60–44	7:15 PM	
Sat., Mar. 13	7	Semifinal #1 (California vs. No. 2 Stanford)	Stanford	64–44	2:30 PM	FSN
Sat., Mar. 13	8	Semifinal #2 (USC vs. No. 23 UCLA)	UCLA	59–53	5:00 PM	FSN
Sun., Mar. 14	9	Championship Game (No. 2 Stanford vs. No. 23 UCLA)	Stanford	70–46	3:00 PM	FSN

Rankings from AP Poll.

=== All-Tournament Team ===
Name	Pos.	Year	Team
Jayne Appel	C	Sr.	Stanford
Ashley Corral	G	So.	USC
Jasmine Dixon	F	Fr.	UCLA
Nnemkadi Ogwumike	F	So.	Stanford
Kayla Pedersen	F	Jr.	Stanford
Markel Walker	G/F	Fr.	UCLA

=== Most Outstanding Player ===
Name	Pos.	Year	Team
Nnemkadi Ogwumike	F	So.	Stanford

This is the 5th time that the MOP of the Tournament was also the Pac-10’s Player of the Year. Stanford’s Nicole Powell (2002, 2004) and Candice Wiggins (2005, 2008) were also MOP and POY in the same season.

== Game notes ==
- Stanford has made the NCAA field for the 23rd consecutive season, 24 times in history.
- Stanford has a 25–2 tournament record. UCLA has an 11–8 record.
- UCLA and Stanford have met 7 times in the tournament, a record, with Stanford winning 6 games.
- The 24-point margin of victory was the 2nd highest in the championship game. Last year's 25-point was the highest.
- Stanford's Jayne Appel and Kayla Pedersen started their third consecutive Tournament title game; Appel started her first game of the Tournament.

== See also ==
- 2010 NCAA Women's Division I Basketball Tournament
