= Nikki Fargas =

American basketball coach

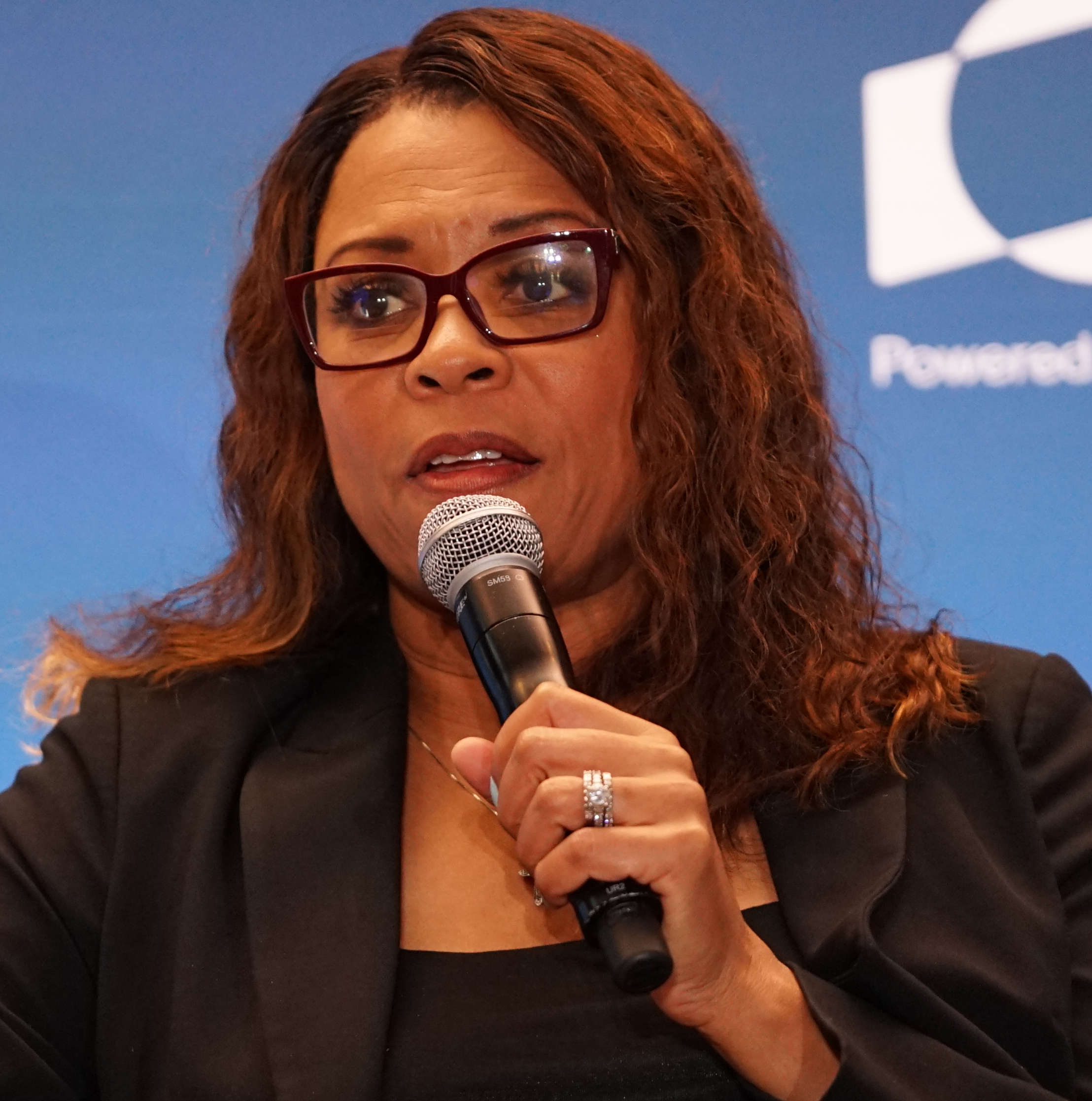
- Fargas at CES 2026

Las Vegas Aces
- Title: President
- League: WNBA

Personal information
- Born: May 21, 1972 (age 54) Oak Ridge, Tennessee, U.S.

Career information
- High school: Oak Ridge (Oak Ridge, Tennessee)
- College: Tennessee (1990–1994)
- Position: Guard
- Coaching career: 1998–2021

Career history

Coaching
- 1998–1999: Tennessee (assistant)
- 1999–2002: Virginia (assistant)
- 2002–2008: Tennessee (assistant)
- 2008–2011: UCLA
- 2011–2021: LSU

Career highlights
- As player: NCAA champion (1991); SEC All-Freshman team (1991); As coach: Pac-10 Coach of the Year (2010)

Career coaching record
- NCAA: 248–154 (.617)
Medals
Women's basketball
Assistant coach for United States
FIBA Americas U18 Championship
Gold medal – first place	2012 Puerto Rico
FIBA U19 World Championship
Gold medal – first place	2013 Lithuania

Yolanda Nicole Fargas (née Caldwell; born May 21, 1972) is an American basketball coach and executive. She is the president of the Las Vegas Aces of the WNBA. Fargas was formerly the head coach for the women's basketball programs at UCLA and LSU.

== Early life ==
Born Yolanda Nicole Caldwell in Oak Ridge, Tennessee, Fargas was raised by her mother and attended public schools. She graduated from Oak Ridge High School in 1990. She was a member of the school basketball team that won the Tennessee state championship in 1988. As of 2009, Fargas still held the high school's single-season records for total points scored and for successful free throws.

== College and career ==
Fargas attended the University of Tennessee from 1990 to 1994, playing as a guard under coach Pat Summitt on the university's Lady Vols basketball team, which compiled a 118–13 won-loss record during her playing years. Fargas was known for her strong defensive play and her three-point shooting. Her defensive play in the 1991 NCAA tournament final game, in which the Lady Vols defeated the University of Virginia in overtime, was considered a key factor in her team's victory. She was named to Southeastern Conference (SEC) All-Freshman team that same year, and in both her junior and senior years she received the university's Gloria Ray Leadership Award. Although she missed portions of two seasons due to injuries, her four-year statistics as a three-point shooter, with 128 three-point field goals made out of 364 attempts, place her in the all-time top 10 at Tennessee.

=== Broadcasting ===
After receiving a bachelor's degree in public relations from the University of Tennessee in 1994, Fargas became a color analyst for Fox Sports Net South broadcasts of Lady Vol basketball games. In 1995 she added the position of color analyst for Fox broadcasts of the SEC Game of the Week, which she continued until 1997, when she became host for sports segments on the Shop at Home Network.

=== Coaching ===
==== Tennessee ====
Fargas returned to basketball in 1998 as a member of Pat Summitt's coaching staff, serving as graduate assistant for administration. The following season she joined the University of Virginia as an assistant coach, assuming responsibilities for recruiting, scouting, film exchange, player development, monitoring academic progress and camps. In 2002, she left Virginia to return to the University of Tennessee as an assistant coach for the 2002–03 season and recruiting director beginning in the spring of 2003.

==== UCLA ====
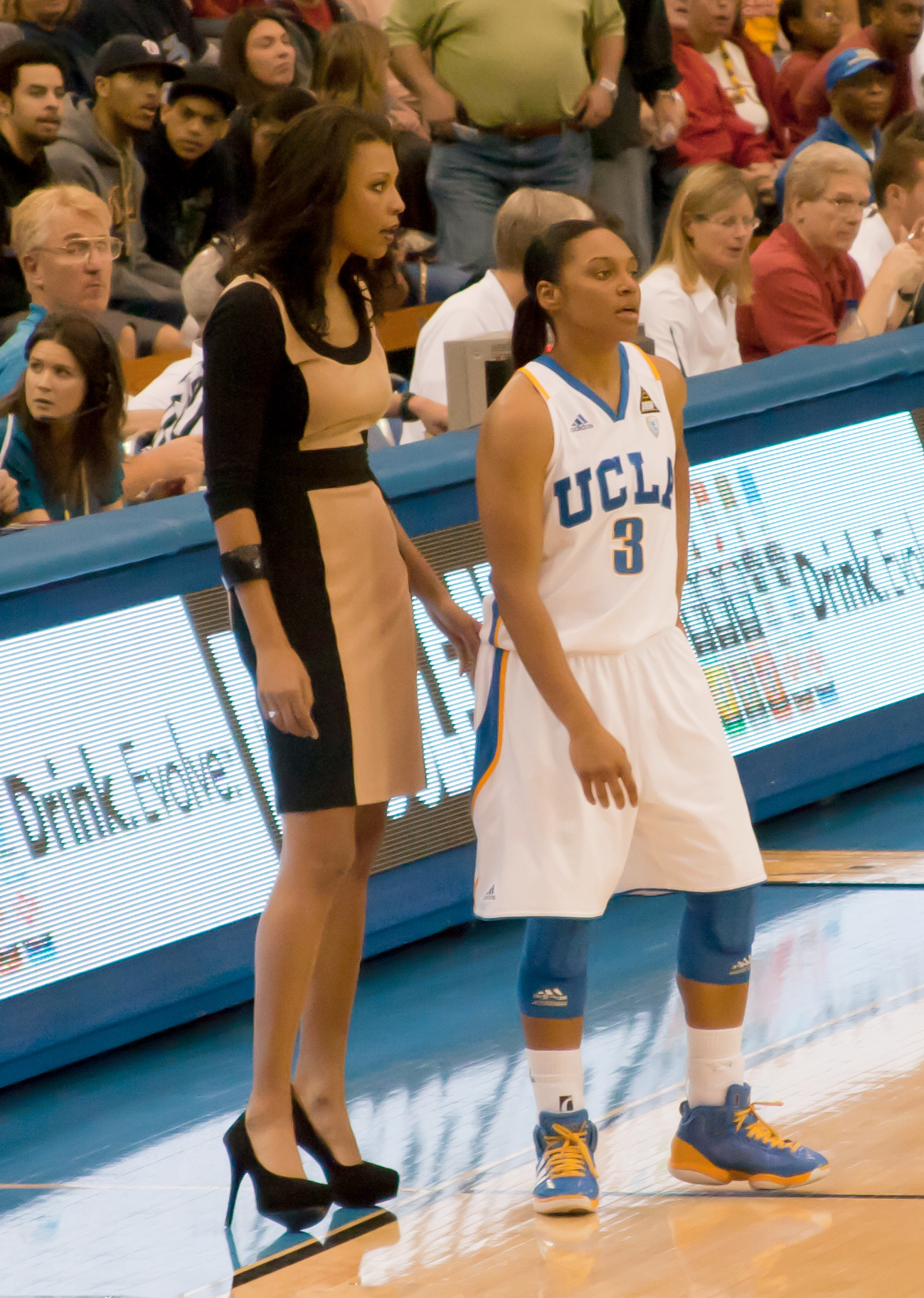
Fargas as UCLA coach (2011)

Fargas was named the head coach at UCLA on April 17, 2008, with a five-year contract valued at nearly $1.5 million, succeeding Kathy Olivier. In her first season, UCLA compiled a regular-season record of 18 wins and 11 losses. During the 2009–2010 season, UCLA placed second in the Pac-10 (25–9) and was defeated by second-ranked Stanford in the Pac-10 tournament. She sought a large raise in her contract. Despite a reportedly generous offer by UCLA, the school could not match the $900,000 annually LSU offered, so she returned to coach in the SEC at LSU.

==== LSU ====
On April 2, 2011, Louisiana State University announced that Fargas would become the head coach for the LSU Lady Tigers team. In seven seasons with the Lady Tigers, she posted a 131–90 record and advanced to the NCAA Tournament in her first seven seasons. She posted her first losing record in 2016 and missed the NCAA tournament for the first time. Fargas resigned from LSU in April 2021.

=== WNBA ===
On May 11, 2021, Fargas was announced as president of the Las Vegas Aces. In her second season with the franchise, they won their first WNBA Finals in team history.

== Head coaching record ==
Record table
Season	Team	Overall	Conference	Standing	Postseason
UCLA Bruins (Pac-10 Conference) (2008–2011)
2008–09	UCLA	19–12	9–9	T–4th	
2009–10	UCLA	25–9	15–3	2nd	NCAA Second Round
2010–11	UCLA	28–5	16–2	2nd	NCAA Second Round
UCLA:		72–26 (.735)	40–14 (.741)		
LSU Lady Tigers (Southeastern Conference) (2011–2021)
2011–12	LSU	23–11	10–6	4th	NCAA Second Round
2012–13	LSU	22–12	10–6	6th	NCAA Sweet Sixteen
2013–14	LSU	21–13	7–9	T–6th	NCAA Sweet Sixteen
2014–15	LSU	17–14	10–6	T–4th	NCAA First Round
2015–16	LSU	10–21	3–13	13th	
2016–17	LSU	20–12	8–8	7th	NCAA First Round
2017–18	LSU	19–10	11–5	4th	NCAA First Round
2018–19	LSU	16–13	7–9	6th	
2019–20	LSU	20–10	9–7	7th	Postseason not held due to COVID-19
2020–21	LSU	9–13	6–8	8th	
LSU:		177–129 (.578)	81–77 (.513)		
Total:		249–155 (.616)			
National champion Postseason invitational champion Conference regular season champion Conference regular season and conference tournament champion Division regular season champion Division regular season and conference tournament champion Conference tournament champion

=== NCAA tournament ===
Year	School	Record	Winning %	Notes	Final RPI
2010	UCLA	1–1	.500	Eliminated by (Nebraska Cornhuskers) in NCAA Second Round	18
2011	UCLA	1–1	.500	Eliminated by (Gonzaga Bulldogs) in NCAA Second Round	11
2012	LSU	1–1	.500	Eliminated by (Penn State Lady Lions) in NCAA Second Round	17
2013	LSU	2–1	.667	Eliminated by (California Golden Bears) in NCAA Sweet 16	26
2014	LSU	2–1	.667	Eliminated by (Louisville Cardinals) in NCAA Sweet 16	15
2015	LSU	0–1	.000	Eliminated by (South Florida Bulls) in NCAA First Round	60
2017	LSU	0–1	.000	Eliminated by (California Golden Bears) in NCAA First Round	40
2018	LSU	0–1	.000	Eliminated by (Central Michigan Chippewas) in NCAA First Round	31
Totals			7–8 (.467)	8 NCAA First Round (Won 5); 5 NCAA Second Round (Won 2); 2 NCAA Sweet 16	

== Public service activities ==
In the company of Holly Warlick, a former assistant coach for University of Tennessee women's basketball, Fargas has conducted three long-distance motorcycle road trips, called "Cruisin' for a Cause", to promote awareness of breast cancer and to raise money for research on this disease. In their first trip, in 2007, they rode their Harley-Davidson motorcycles from Berkeley, California to Knoxville, Tennessee. As of 2008, the two women's non-profit organization, Champions for a Cause, had raised nearly $100,000. The 2010 road trip took them through Washington, DC and New York City to Niagara Falls and back.

== Awards ==
In May 2009, Fargas received the Woman of Excellence Award from the LadyLike Foundation for her excellence as a coach and for fund-raising activities for breast cancer awareness. Fargas was named 2010 Pac-10 Coach of the Year by the conference coaches and by the media in her second year of coaching at UCLA.

== Family ==
Fargas' uncle, Mike Caldwell, played for the Philadelphia Eagles in the National Football League and is currently the linebackers coach for the Las Vegas Raiders.

In March 2012, Fargas gave birth to a girl named Justice with her husband, former Oakland Raiders player Justin Fargas (coincidentally, Raiders ownership acquired the Aces when she joined the team). Her father-in-law is Starsky and Hutch actor Antonio Fargas, who played Huggy Bear.
