= Chiney Ogwumike =

Nigerian-American basketball player (born 1992)

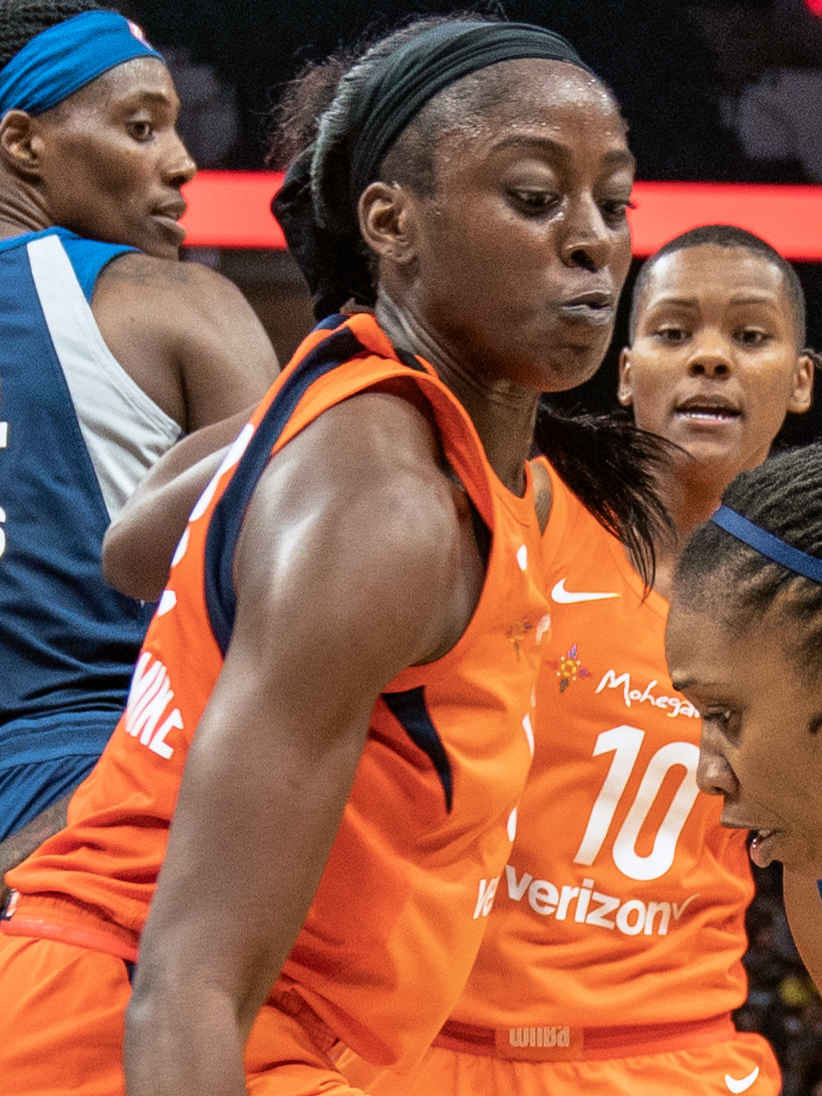

Personal information
- Born: March 21, 1992 (age 34) Tomball, Texas, U.S.
- Listed height: 6 ft 2 in (1.88 m)
- Listed weight: 183 lb (83 kg)

Career information
- High school: Cy-Fair (Cypress, Texas)
- College: Stanford (2010–2014)
- WNBA draft: 2014: 1st round, 1st overall pick
- Drafted by: Connecticut Sun
- Playing career: 2014–present
- Position: Power forward

Career history
- 2014–2018: Connecticut Sun
- 2014–2015: Famila Schio
- 2016: Henan Phoenix
- 2019, 2021–2023: Los Angeles Sparks

Career highlights
- 2× WNBA All-Star (2014, 2018); WNBA Rookie of the Year (2014); WNBA All-Rookie Team (2014); Women's Basketball Academic All-American of the Year (2014); John R. Wooden Award (2014); 2× All-American USBWA (2013, 2014); 2× First-team All-American – AP (2013, 2014); Second-team All-American – AP (2012); 3× WBCA Coaches' All-American (2012–2014); 3× Pac-12 Defensive Player of the Year (2012–2014); 2× Pac-12 Player of the Year (2013, 2014); Pac-12 Tournament MOP (2013); 4× Pac-12 All-Defensive Team (2011–2014); 4× All-Pac 12 (2011–2014); Pac-12 All-Freshman Team (2011); Pac-12 Freshman of the Year (2011); Naismith Prep Player of the Year (2010); Morgan Wootten Player of the Year (2010); McDonald's All-American (2010); Gatorade Female Athlete of the Year (2010); Gatorade National Player of the Year (2010); MaxPreps National Player of the Year (2010); Texas Miss Basketball (2010)
- Stats at WNBA.com
- Stats at Basketball Reference
Medals
Women's basketball
Representing United States
World University Games
Gold medal – first place	2011 Shenzhen	Team
FIBA Under-18 Americas Championship
Gold medal – first place	2010 United States	Team
Gold medal – first place	2008 Argentina	Team
Basketball 3x3
Representing United States
FIBA 3x3 World Cup
Gold medal – first place	2012 Greece	Team

Chinenye Joy "Chiney" Ogwumike (born March 21, 1992) is an American professional basketball player who last played for the Los Angeles Sparks of the Women's National Basketball Association (WNBA). In 2020, she became the first black woman and the first WNBA player to host a national radio show for ESPN. She was one of the first and youngest commentators ever to be named an NBA analyst for the network covering the NBA, WNBA, and variety of sports, while simultaneously playing in the WNBA. Chiney is a graduate of Stanford University, where she majored in International relations. She played in three Final Fours and finished as the conference leader in scoring and rebounding as of January 3, 2014. As of 2016, Ogwumike was elected vice-president of the WNBA Players Association, and signed an endorsement deal with Adidas. In May 2018, Ogwumike signed a multi-year contract with ESPN to become a full-time basketball analyst.

== Early life ==
Born in Tomball, Texas, Ogwumike attended Cy-Fair High School in nearby Cypress, Texas, winning the 5A State Championship in her sophomore and senior seasons. Ogwumike was named a WBCA and McDonald's All-American. She participated in the 2010 WBCA High School All-America Game, where she scored 24 points, and earned MVP honors for the White team.

== College career ==
Ogwumike chose Stanford over Connecticut and Notre Dame, joining her sister Nneka Ogwumike.

Ogwumike ended her Stanford career in 2014 as the all-time career scoring leader for either sex in Pac-12 Conference history, a record that fell in 2016 to Kelsey Plum of Washington.

== Professional career ==
Ogwumike was drafted first overall in the 2014 WNBA draft by the Connecticut Sun. In her rookie season, Ogwumike became a starter, averaging a career-high 15.5 points per game and 7.5 rebounds per game. She was named a WNBA All-Star along with her sister Nneka Ogwumike, becoming the first pair of sisters to be selected into a WNBA All-Star game. Ogwumike would also win the WNBA Rookie of the Year Award in 2014.

After the WNBA season ended, Ogwumike signed with Italian club Famila Schio. In seven games for Famila Schio, she averaged 25.3 points and 13.1 rebounds per game, but then suffered a knee injury that required microfracture surgery and resulted in her missing the entire 2015 WNBA season.

Ogwumike came back healthy for the 2016 season, playing 33 games with 18 starts while averaging 12.6 points per game. She had scored a career-high 26 points along with 15 rebounds in a regular season game win against the Dallas Wings. During the 2016 WNBA season, Ogwumike had signed with Henan Phoenix of the WCBA for the 2016–17 Chinese season. In her fifth game with the team, Ogwumike scored 56 points (on 23 of 24 field goal shooting) along with 12 rebounds She would end up winning first round MVP, averaging 33.6 points per game and 12.4 rebounds per game, prior to her achilles injury. In December 2016, it was announced that Ogwumike had undergone surgery after injuring her achilles. She was ruled out with an estimated recovery period of 6–9 months, which caused her to miss the 2017 WNBA season.

In April 2017, Ogwumike was suspended by the Sun for the entire 2017 season to free up a roster spot due to her injury and that same month she also signed a contract extension.

On May 20, 2018, Ogwumike made her return to the Sun in their season debut, playing her first WNBA game in two years. In 17 minutes of play, she scored 9 points in the starting lineup in a 101–65 victory over the Las Vegas Aces. On June 30, 2018, Ogwumike scored a new career-high of 30 points in a 103–92 loss to the Seattle Storm. Later on in the 2018 season, it was announced that Ogwumike was voted into the 2018 WNBA All-Star Game, making it her second all-star appearance. The Sun finished as the number 4 seed in the league with a 21–13 record, receiving a bye to the second round elimination game. The Sun would lose 96–86 to the Phoenix Mercury.

On April 28, 2019, Ogwumike was traded to the Los Angeles Sparks for a 2020 first-round pick, reuniting her with her sister Nneka. The Sparks finished as the number 3 seed with a 22–12 record, receiving a bye to the second round. In the second round elimination game, the Sparks defeated the defending champion Seattle Storm 92–69. In the semi-finals, the Sparks were eliminated by her former team, the Connecticut Sun in a three-game sweep.

In June 2020, Ogwumike announced she would sit out the 2020 WNBA season due to health concerns of playing in the bubble during the COVID-19 pandemic. Without Ogwumike, the Sparks finished the season 15–7 as the number 3 seed with a bye to the second round but would get eliminated by the Connecticut Sun in the elimination game.

In February 2021, Ogwumike re-signed with the Sparks to a multi-year deal.

Ogwumike has not made an official retirement announcement to date, but she has not played since the 2023 WNBA season. Instead she has focused on her career as a sports broadcaster for ESPN.

== National team career ==
Ogwumike was named to the USA Basketball U18 team. The USA team was one of eight teams from North, South and Central America, along with the Caribbean, invited to participate in the 2010 FIBA Americas U18 Championship For Women, held at the U.S. Olympic Training Center, in Colorado Springs, Colorado. The team was coached by Jennifer Rizzotti. Ogwumike started all five games and was the leading scorer with 13.2 points per game. She was also the leading rebounder with 7.4 rebounds per game. The USA team won all five games and captured the gold medal.

The usual sequence is for the players on the U18 team to move to the U19 team. However. Ogwumike played so well as a U18 that she was promoted to the World University Games team for the 2011 World University Games held in Shenzhen, China. Chiney was not the only Ogwumike on the team, as her sister, Nneka Ogwumike, was also on the team. Both started every game, with Chiney scoring almost ten points per game. She hit 25 of 37 shot attempts for a team leading 67.6% shooting percentage. She helped the USA win all six games and earn the gold medal.

== ESPN career ==
In May 2018, Ogwumike signed a multi-year contract with ESPN to become a full-time basketball analyst. In August 2020, she became the first Black woman to host a national radio show for ESPN, while also becoming the first WNBA player to do so as well. She is one of the youngest commentators to be named a full-time NBA analyst for ESPN, while simultaneously playing in the WNBA. Ogwumike was partnered with Mike Golic Jr., as the co-host of the ESPN radio show Chiney & Golic Jr.. After the re-organization of ESPN's NBA coverage, she joined the daily series NBA Today as a rotating in-studio analyst.

Ogwumike also served as executive producer for 144, an ESPN Films documentary about the shortened 2020 WNBA Season, filmed in the COVID-19 "wubble" in Bradenton, Florida.

== Career statistics ==
=== College ===
College career statistics
Year	Team	GP	Points	FG%	3P%	FT%	RPG	APG	SPG	BPG	PPG
2010–11	Stanford	35	409	.574	.000	.626	8.0	0.9	**1.5**	0.8	11.7
2011–12	Stanford	**37**	556	.583	.000	.663	10.1	1.4	0.8	1.2	15.0
2012–13	Stanford	36	805	.586	.250	**.776**	**12.9**	1.5	1.4	1.7	22.4
2013–14	Stanford	**37**	**967**	**.601**	**.267**	.713	12.1	**1.7**	1.2	**1.8**	**26.1**
Career		145	2,737	.589	.263	.705	10.8	1.4	1.2	1.4	18.9

=== WNBA ===
Legend
GP	Games played	GS	Games started	MPG	Minutes per game	RPG	Rebounds per game
APG	Assists per game	SPG	Steals per game	BPG	Blocks per game	PPG	Points per game
TO	Turnovers per game	FG%	Field-goal percentage	3P%	3-point field-goal percentage	FT%	Free-throw percentage
**Bold**	Career best	°	League leader

==== Regular season ====
Year	Team	GP	GS	MPG	FG%	3P%	FT%	RPG	APG	SPG	BPG	TO	PPG
2014	Connecticut	31	**31**	**29.7**	.536	—	.693	**7.5**	0.6	1.2	1.2	1.9	**15.5**
2016	Connecticut	**33**	18	24.3	.587	—	.719	6.7	0.7	1.0	1.0	1.5	12.6
2018	Connecticut	31	**31**	25.5	**.603**	.500	.797	7.3	1.0	1.1	0.6	1.6	14.4
2019	Los Angeles	32	14	21.8	.494	.250	**.809**	5.8	0.8	1.0	0.7	1.3	9.6
2021	Los Angeles	7	3	19.1	.408	**.750**	.750	4.1	**1.3**	0.9	0.4	**0.9**	7.0
2022	Los Angeles	26	7	18.4	.466	.444	.706	5.5	1.1	0.8	0.3	1.4	7.0
2023	Los Angeles	10	4	21.2	.430	.077	.714	4.3	**1.3**	**1.3**	0.3	1.2	8.4
Career	7 years, 2 teams	170	108	23.7	.535	.341	.741	6.5	0.9	1.0	0.7	1.5	11.6

==== Playoffs ====
Year	Team	GP	GS	MPG	FG%	3P%	FT%	RPG	APG	SPG	BPG	TO	PPG
2018	Connecticut	1	0	19.1	.200	.000	.000	3.0	1.0	2.0	0.0	0.0	2.0
2019	Los Angeles	**4**	0	16.6	**.500**	.000	**.857**	**3.3**	0.8	0.8	**0.5**	**0.8**	**6.0**
Career	2 years, 2 teams	5	0	17.1	.435	.000	.857	3.2	0.8	1.0	0.4	0.6	5.2

== Awards ==
- 2010—WBCA High School Coaches' All-America Team
- 2011—All-Pacific-10 Conference Team
- 2011—All-Pac-10 All-Defensive Team
- 2011—All-Pac-10 Tournament Team
- 2011—Pac-10 Freshman of the Year
- 2013—Pac-12 Player of the Year
- 2013—Pac-12 Defensive Player of the Year
- 2014—ESPNW First Team All-American
- 2014—USBWA All-American team
- 2014—John R. Wooden Award
- 2014—Pac-12 Player of the Year
- 2014—Pac-12 Defensive Player of the Year
- 2014—WNBA Rookie of the Year

== Off the court ==
=== Personal life ===
Ogwumike is Catholic. Ogwumike's older sister, Nneka Ogwumike, plays for the Los Angeles Sparks.

In November 2023, Ogwumike married Nigerian boxer, Raphael Akpejiori.

=== In popular culture ===
In December 2020, Ogwumike was named to Forbes 30 Under 30, alongside fellow WNBA players, Natasha Cloud and A'ja Wilson.

=== Advocacy ===
In 2014, Ogwumike and her sister, Nneka Ogwumike, held a fundraiser to support UNICEF programs that promote education and empowerment for girls in Nigeria following the mass kidnapping of schoolgirls by Boko Haram earlier that year.

In October 2023, Ogwumike became an inaugural member of the President's Advisory Council on African Diaspora Engagement in the United States.
