= Sports in Washington =

Sports in Washington may refer to:

- Sports in Washington (state)
- Sports in Washington, D.C.
- Washington, Tyne & Wear § Sport
