= June Daugherty =

Women's basketball coach (1956–2021)

Biographical details
- Born: August 11, 1956; Columbus, Ohio, U.S.
- Died: August 2, 2021 (aged 64); Boise, Idaho, U.S.

Playing career
- 1974–1978: Ohio State

Coaching career (HC unless noted)

Women's Basketball
- 1983–1985: Kent State (asst.)
- 1985–1989: Stanford (asst.)
- 1989–1996: Boise State
- 1996–2007: Washington
- 2007–2018: Washington State

Head coaching record
- Overall: 443–431 (.507)
- Tournaments: 6–8 (NCAA); 2–4 (WNIT)

Accomplishments and honors

Championships
- 2× Big Sky regular season (1992, 1994); Pac-10 regular season (2001)

June Karen Daugherty (née Brewer; August 11, 1956 – August 2, 2021) was an American women's college basketball coach who was head coach at Washington State University.

== Coaching career ==
In her seven years as head coach at Boise State from 1989 to 1996, Daugherty finished with a 122–75 record, 73–31 in the Big Sky Conference.

In her 11 years at Washington from 1996 to 2007, Daugherty took her teams to the NCAA tournament 6 times, including her final year. Her contract was not renewed after the season. Daugherty finished with a 191–131 record, 113–85 in the Pac-10.

Daugherty became head coach at rival Washington State in 2007 after being fired from Washington. She led Washington State to WNIT appearances in 2014 and 2015. On March 13, 2018, it was announced that Daugherty was fired as head coach of WSU.

== Personal life ==
Daugherty was married to husband Mike, who formerly served as the associate head coach for WSU, and UW. They have twin children, Doc and Breanne.

She suffered from health issues for many years, and died at the age of 64 from heart troubles.

== Head coaching record ==
Record table
Season	Team	Overall	Conference	Standing	Postseason
Boise State Broncos (Big Sky Conference) (1989–1996)
1989–90	Boise State	19–12	11–5	T–2nd	
1990–91	Boise State	11–16	8–8	5th	
1991–92	Boise State	22–7	14–2	1st	
1992–93	Boise State	19–8	9–5	3rd	
1993–94	Boise State	23–6	12–2	T–1st	NCAA first round
1994–95	Boise State	16–11	10–4	2nd	
1995–96	Boise State	12–15	9–5	T–2nd	
Boise State:		122–75 (.619)	73–31 (.702)		
Washington Huskies (Pac-10 Conference) (1996–2007)
1996–97	Washington	17–11	12–6	4th	NCAA first round
1997–98	Washington	18–10	9–9	5th	NCAA first round
1998–99	Washington	16–13	11–7	5th	WNIT Second round
1999–2000	Washington	8–22	4–14	9th	
2000–01	Washington	22–10	12–6	T–1st	NCAA Elite Eight
2001–02	Washington	19–12	12–6	T–2nd	WNIT Quarterfinals
2002–03	Washington	22–8	13–5	T–2nd	NCAA first round
2003–04	Washington	18–13	9–9	6th	WNIT Second round
2004–05	Washington	14–16	9–9	7th	
2005–06	Washington	19–11	11–7	T–4th	NCAA second round
2006–07	Washington	18–13	11–7	4th	NCAA first round
Washington:		191–139 (.579)	113–85 (.571)		
Washington State Cougars (Pac-10/12 Conference) (2007–present)
2007–08	Washington State	5–25	2–16	10th	
2008–09	Washington State	11–19	4–14	9th	
2009–10	Washington State	8–22	3–15	9th	
2010–11	Washington State	8–23	6–12	8th	
2011–12	Washington State	13–20	5–13	11th	
2012–13	Washington State	11–20	6–12	8th	
2013–14	Washington State	17–17	9–9	7th	WNIT First round
2014–15	Washington State	17–15	7–11	T-7th	WNIT First round
2015–16	Washington State	14–16	5–13	9th	
2016–17	Washington State	16–20	6–12	7th	WNIT Semi-Finals
2017–18	Washington State	10–20	3–14	10th	
Washington State:		130–217 (.375)	56–141 (.284)		
Total:		443–431 (.507)			
National champion Postseason invitational champion Conference regular season champion Conference regular season and conference tournament champion Division regular season champion Division regular season and conference tournament champion Conference tournament champion
