= Stanford–UConn women's basketball rivalry =

American college basketball rivalry

Stanford–UConn women’s basketball rivalry
- Stanford Cardinal UConn Huskies
- First meeting: December 9, 1988; Stanford 72, UConn 53
- Latest meeting: April 1, 2022; UConn 63, Stanford 58
- Next meeting: TBD

Statistics
- Total meetings: 19
- All-time series: UConn leads, 12–7
- Largest victory: UConn, 87–60 (1995)
- Longest win streak: UConn, 4 (2011–2014)
- Current win streak: UConn, 2 (2017–Present)

The Stanford–UConn women’s basketball rivalry is an intercollegiate basketball rivalry between the Stanford Cardinal and UConn Huskies. The rivalry series is between two of the most successful in women's basketball, as the programs have combined for 14 NCAA titles. Stanford and UConn have met seven times in the NCAA tournament, with six of these postseason meetings occurring in the Final Four. As of 2022, UConn leads the series 12–7.

== Series history ==
After Stanford won the first three meetings, UConn grabbed their first victory in the 1995 tournament, blowing out the Cardinal by a score of 87–60 in the national semifinals. UConn would win its following game over Tennessee for their first national championship.

The teams would meet thrice more in the postseason before the 2010 tournament with the national title at stake. In San Antonio, UConn downed Stanford 53 to 47 to overcome an 8 point halftime deficit and cap off an undefeated season. The following season, the Cardinal snapped the Huskies' 90-game winning streak, a week after Connecticut had broken the previous record of 88 games by UCLA. The loss was the first by UConn since 2008, when Stanford had beaten the Huskies in the 2008 Final Four. The Huskies returned the favor in 2012, ending the Cardinal's 82-game winning steak at Maples Pavilion in a 1-2 ranked matchup.

In 2014, the Cardinal again played spoilers. Stanford defeated the Huskies in overtime to snap UConn's 47-game winning streak. Amber Orrange hit a game-tying 3-pointer in the closing seconds of the second half, sending the game to extra time, and then scored the go-ahead basket in the final two minutes of overtime. The Huskies followed that defeat by reeling off 111 wins in a row, including another victory over the Cardinal in the national semifinals of the 2014 NCAA tournament.

== Rival accomplishments ==
The following summarizes the accomplishments of the two programs.

Team	Stanford Cardinal	UConn Huskies
NCAA National Titles	3	11
NCAA Final Four Appearances	14	20
NCAA Tournament Appearances	34	31
NCAA Tournament Record	95–31	121–20
Conference Tournament Titles	14	25
Conference Championships	25	26
First Team AP All-Americans	7	16
Naismith Players of the Year	2	10
All-time Program Record	1,118–340	1,183–304
All-time Winning Percentage	.767	.796

== Game results ==
Connecticut victories	Stanford victories

No.	Date	Location	Winner	Score
1	December 29, 1988	Stanford, CA	#9 Stanford	73–52
2	February 20, 1993	Storrs, CT	#10 Stanford	68–54
3	December 28, 1993	Stanford, CA	#11 Stanford	94–75
4	April 1, 1995	Minneapolis, MN	#1 Connecticut	87–60
5	December 21, 1997	Lakeland, FL	#3 Connecticut	94–78
6	March 27, 2005	Kansas City, MO	#1 Stanford	76–59
7	November 22, 2007	Saint Thomas, USVI	#2 Connecticut	66–54
8	April 6, 2008	Tampa, FL	#4 Stanford	82–73
9	April 5, 2009	St. Louis, MO	#1 Connecticut	83–64
10	December 23, 2009	Storrs, CT	#1 Connecticut	80–68

No.	Date	Location	Winner	Score
11	April 6, 2010	San Antonio, TX	#1 Connecticut	53–47
12	December 30, 2010	Stanford, CA	#9 Stanford	71–59
13	November 21, 2011	Storrs, CT	#2 Connecticut	68–58
14	December 29, 2012	Stanford, CA	#2 Connecticut	61–35
15	November 11, 2013	Storrs, CT	#1 Connecticut	76–57
16	April 6, 2014	Nashville, TN	#1 Connecticut	75–56
17	November 17, 2014	Stanford, CA	#6 Stanford	88–86^{OT}
18	November 12, 2017	Columbus, OH	#1 Connecticut	78–53
19	April 1, 2022	Minneapolis, MN	#5 Connecticut	63–58
Series: Connecticut leads 12–7
