= Nneka Ogwumike =

American basketball player (born 1990)

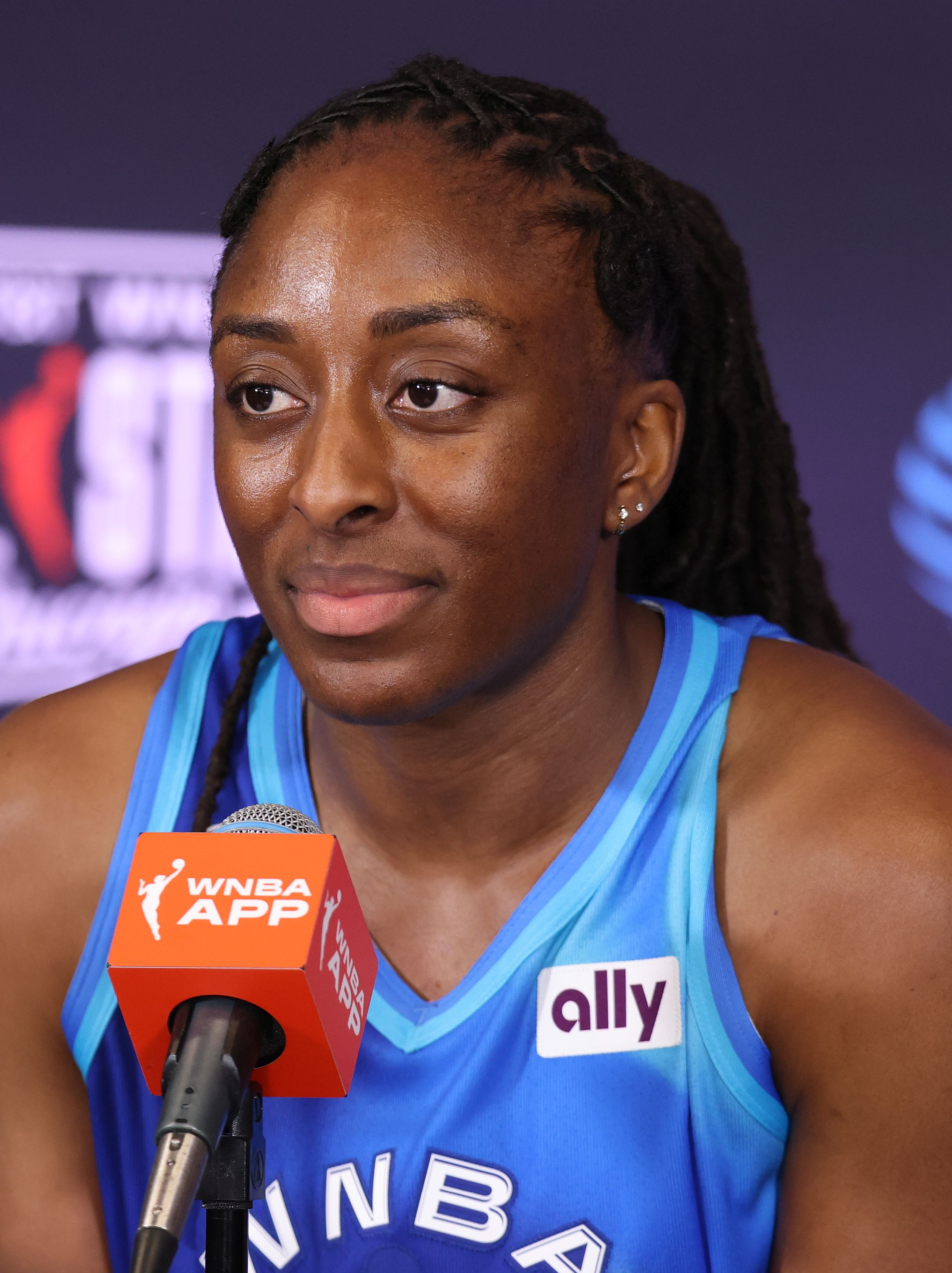
- Ogwumike in 2026

Personal information
- Born: July 2, 1990 (age 36) Tomball, Texas, U.S.
- Listed height: 6 ft 2 in (1.88 m)
- Listed weight: 190 lb (86 kg)

Career information
- High school: Cy-Fair (Cypress, Texas)
- College: Stanford (2008–2012)
- WNBA draft: 2012: 1st round, 1st overall pick
- Drafted by: Los Angeles Sparks
- Playing career: 2012–2026
- Position: Power forward

Career history
- 2012–2023: Los Angeles Sparks
- 2012–2013: CCC Polkowice
- 2013–2014: Guangdong Vermilion Birds
- 2014–2018: Dynamo Kursk
- 2019: Guangdong Vermilion Birds
- 2024–2025: Seattle Storm
- 2026: Los Angeles Sparks

Career highlights
- WNBA champion (2016); WNBA MVP (2016); WNBA Rookie of the Year (2012); WNBA All-Rookie Team (2012); 11× WNBA All-Star (2013–2015, 2017–2019, 2022–2026); All-WNBA First Team (2016); 7× All-WNBA Second Team (2014, 2017, 2019, 2022-2025); 4× WNBA All-Defensive First Team (2015–2017, 2019); 3× WNBA All-Defensive Second Team (2018, 2023, 2024); 5× Kim Perrot Sportsmanship Award (2019–2021, 2025–2026); WNBA 25th Anniversary Team (2021); EuroLeague champion (2017); Polish National League champion (2013); Senior CLASS Award (2012); First-team All-American – AP (2012); WBCA Coaches' All-American (2012); 2× State Farm All-American (2010, 2011); 3× All-American – USBWA (2010–2012); 2× Pac-12 Player of the Year (2010, 2012); 2× Second-team All-American – AP (2010, 2011); Pac-12 Tournament MOP (2010–2012); 3× All-Pac 12 (2010–2012); Pac-12 All-Freshman Team (2009); MaxPreps National Player of the Year (2008); McDonald's All-American (2008); Gatorade National Player of the Year (2008); 2× Texas Miss Basketball (2007, 2008)
- Stats at WNBA.com
- Stats at Basketball Reference
Medals
Women's basketball
Representing the United States
World Cup
Gold medal – first place	2014 Turkey
Gold medal – first place	2018 Spain
World University Games
Gold medal – first place	2011 Shenzhen	Team
FIBA Under-19 World Cup
Gold medal – first place	2009 Thailand	Team
FIBA Under-18 Americas Championship
Gold medal – first place	2008 Argentina	Team

Nnemkadi Chinwe Victoria "Nneka" Ogwumike // (/ˈnɛkə oʊˈɡwuːmɪkeɪ/; born July 2, 1990) is an American former professional basketball player. She was drafted by the Sparks first overall in the 2012 WNBA draft and signed an endorsement deal with Nike soon after. Ogwumike spent her first 12 seasons with the Sparks and was named WNBA MVP for the 2016 WNBA season and won the WNBA Finals the same year. She was named to The W25, the league's list of the top 25 players of its first 25 years, in 2021. Ogwumike is considered one of the greatest WNBA players of all-time.

Her name "Nneka" means "Mother is Supreme" in the Igbo language of Nigeria, where her family hails from. She is the older sister of Chiney Ogwumike, the first overall pick in the 2014 WNBA draft, who most recently played for the Sparks. She attended Cy-Fair High School in Cypress, Texas and led them to a 5A State Championship in her senior season. While at Stanford University she helped the Cardinal reach the Final Four four times. Ogwumike was elected President of the WNBA Players Association in 2016 and was re-elected to a new three-year term in 2019.

== Early life ==
Ogwumike was named a WBCA All-American. She participated in the 2008 WBCA High School All-America Game, where she scored 17 points, grabbed 6 rebounds, and earned MVP honors for the White team. She averaged 16.8 points, 8.0 rebounds, 1.8 assists, 2.4 steals and 0.8 blocks per game during the 2007–08 season at Cy-Fair High School.

== College career ==
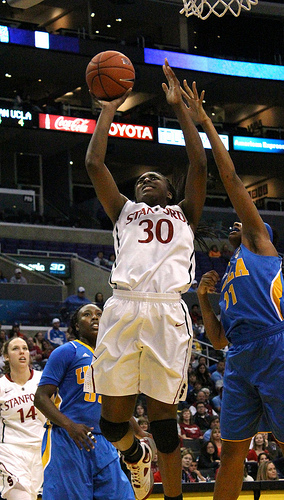
Ogwumike at Stanford

Ogwumike chose Stanford over Baylor, Duke, Connecticut, Tennessee and Notre Dame. She was a member of USA Under 18 Team that won gold in Argentina on July 23–27, 2008. Nneka tallied 20 points and 15 rebounds in the championship game of the Under-18 FIBA Americas. She led team USA to a 5–0 record while leading the team in scoring and rebounding. She was named MVP of this tournament in Argentina.

Nneka also played with her sister, Chiney Ogwumike, at Stanford.

In a 100–80 victory over Oregon on January 23, 2010, Ogwumike set a new Cardinal record for rebounds in a game with 23.

On December 20, 2011, Ogwumike scored a career-high 42 points on 19 for 27 shooting while also grabbing 17 rebounds in a 97–80 win over the sixth-ranked Tennessee Lady Vols.

On January 7, 2012, Ogwumike surpassed both the 2,000 point and the 1,000 rebound thresholds for her career with a 33-point, 16 rebound performance against Oregon State.

Stanford reached the NCAA Final Four every year Ogwumike played at Stanford, and reached the championship game once.

Ogwumike left the Stanford Cardinal as the second all-time leading scorer for the women's basketball program, behind only Candice Wiggins.

== USA Basketball ==
Ogwumike was a member of the USA Women's U18 team which won the gold medal at the FIBA Americas Championship in Buenos Aires, Argentina. The event was held in July 2008, when the USA team defeated host Argentina to win the championship. Ogwumike helped the team win all five games, starting all five games and leading all scorers with 12.6 points per game. She was also the leading rebounder with 8 per game. Ogwumike recorded 15 rebounds in the final game against Argentina, an U18 record.

Ogwumike continued on to the USA Women's U19 team which represented the US in the 2009 U19 World's Championship, held in Bangkok, Thailand in July and August 2009. Although the USA team lost the opening game to Spain, they went on to win their next seven games to earn a rematch against Spain in the finals, and won the game 81–71 to earn the gold medal. Ogwumike started all nine games and was the team's leading scorer, with 13.6 points per game. She was the leading rebounder with almost ten per game, and was named to the all-tournament team.

Ogwumike played on the team presenting the US at the 2011 World University Games held in Shenzhen, China, along with her sister, Chiney Ogwumike . The team, coached by Bill Fennelly, won all six games to earn the gold medal. Ogwumike averaged 13.2 points and 5.7 rebounds per game, both second place on the team behind Elena Delle Donne.

Ogwumike had also played for Team USA at the 2014 FIBA World Championship for Women, helping Team USA beat Spain 77–64 in the gold medal game.

She has been pushing to switch nationality to represent Nigeria's D'Tigress after she withdrew from representing the USA women's team in 2020.

On October 17, 2025, Ogwumike confirmed in a phone interview with the Associated Press that she has lost her third appeal to play for Nigeria.

== WNBA career ==
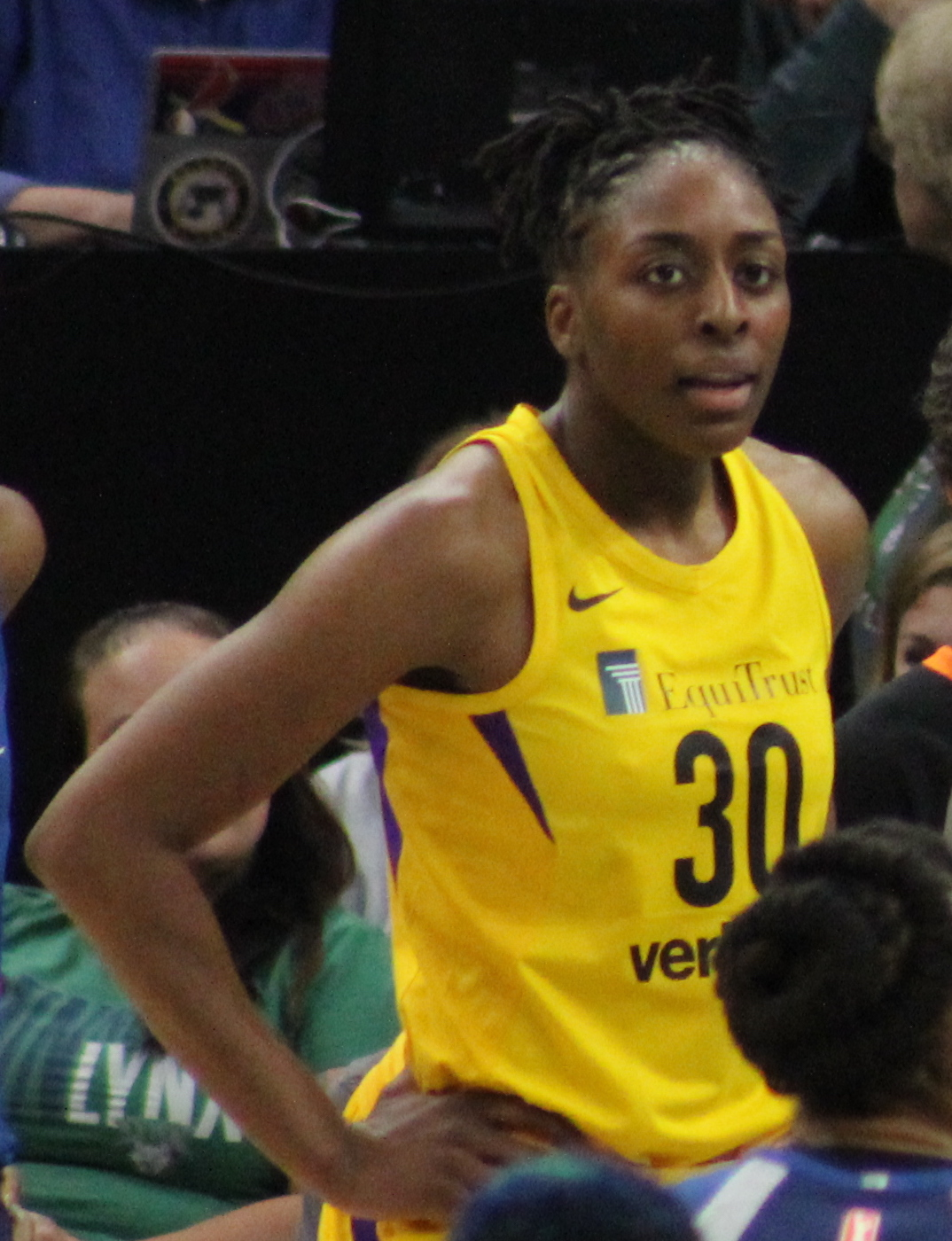
Ogwumike in 2018

=== Los Angeles Sparks (2012–2023) ===
On April 16, 2012, the Los Angeles Sparks picked Ogwumike first overall in the 2012 WNBA draft. She became the second player from Cypress-Fairbanks High School to be drafted No. 1 overall into the WNBA after Lindsey Harding in 2007. On July 12, 2012, Ogwumike set a career-high in rebounds with 20 to go along with 22 points in a 77–74 win over the eventual WNBA champion Indiana Fever. On September 13, 2012, she scored a season high 30 points on 10 of 15 shooting to go along with 11 rebounds in an 86–77 win over the Chicago Sky. In the regular season finale on September 20, 2012, Ogwumike matched her teammate Candace Parker for team highs in both points and rebounds with each player earning 22 and 11, respectively, in a 92–76 win over the defending WNBA champion Minnesota Lynx. Ogwumike was 10 for 13 from the field.

Ogwumike was named WNBA Rookie of the Month four out of five times in her rookie season. On October 7, 2012, Ogwumike was awarded as the 2012 WNBA Rookie of the Year. It marked the fifth consecutive year that the award had been won by the first overall draft pick.

During the 2014 season, Ogwumike averaged 15.8 ppg and was voted as a WNBA All-star for the second time in her career along with her sister Chiney Ogwumike, becoming the first pair of sisters to be selected into a WNBA All-Star game.

In 2016, Ogwumike re-signed with the Sparks once her rookie contract expired. During the season, Ogwumike was named AP WNBA Player of the Year, while finishing third in the league in scoring (19.7 ppg), third in the league in rebounding (9.1 rpg) and first in field goal percentage (.665). Her season performance would also help her earn the 2016 WNBA Most Valuable Player Award. During the season, Ogwumike had set a WNBA record for most consecutive field goals made (23 consecutive field goals over three games) and set a new WNBA single-game record for most field-goal attempts without a miss in which she scored 32 points on 12 of 12 field goal shooting in a 97–73 win over the Dallas Wings. On June 30, 2016, she scored a career-high 38 points along with 11 rebounds in an 84–75 victory against the Atlanta Dream. In addition, she set the basketball record for highest true shooting percentage by reaching 73.7% during the season, becoming the most efficient shooter in the history of professional basketball. With a supporting cast of Candace Parker and Kristi Toliver, the Sparks were a championship contender in the league with a 26–8 record. With the WNBA's new playoff format in effect, the Sparks were the number 2 seed in the league with a double-bye to the semi-finals (the last round before the WNBA Finals) facing the Chicago Sky. The Sparks defeated the Sky 3–1 in the series, advancing to the WNBA Finals for the first time since 2003. In the WNBA Finals, it was the second time in league history where two teams from the same conference faced each other in the Finals due to the new playoff format. Against the championship-defending Minnesota Lynx, the Sparks won the championship in a hard-fought five-game series, winning their first championship since 2002. Ogwumike won her first career WNBA championship. In game five of the series, Ogwumike had 12 points along with 12 rebounds and scored a game-winning shot after grabbing an offensive rebound to put the Sparks up 77–76 with 3 seconds left in the game. Ogwumike became the seventh player in WNBA history to win both the regular season MVP award and a championship in the same season.

In 2017, Ogwumike signed a contract extension with the Sparks. During the 2017 season, Ogwumike was voted into the 2017 WNBA All-Star Game, making it her fourth career all-star appearance. On August 18, 2017, Ogwumike scored a season-high 32 points along with 10 rebounds in a 115–106 double overtime victory over the Chicago Sky. By the end of the season, Ogwumike led the Sparks in scoring for the second season in a row, averaging 18.8 ppg and the Sparks finished as the number 2 seed for the second year in a row with the same record, receiving a double-bye to the semi-finals. The Sparks would go on to advance to the Finals for the second season in a row, after defeating the Phoenix Mercury in a 3-game sweep, setting up a rematch with the Lynx. However, the Sparks would lose in five games, failing to win back-to-back championships.

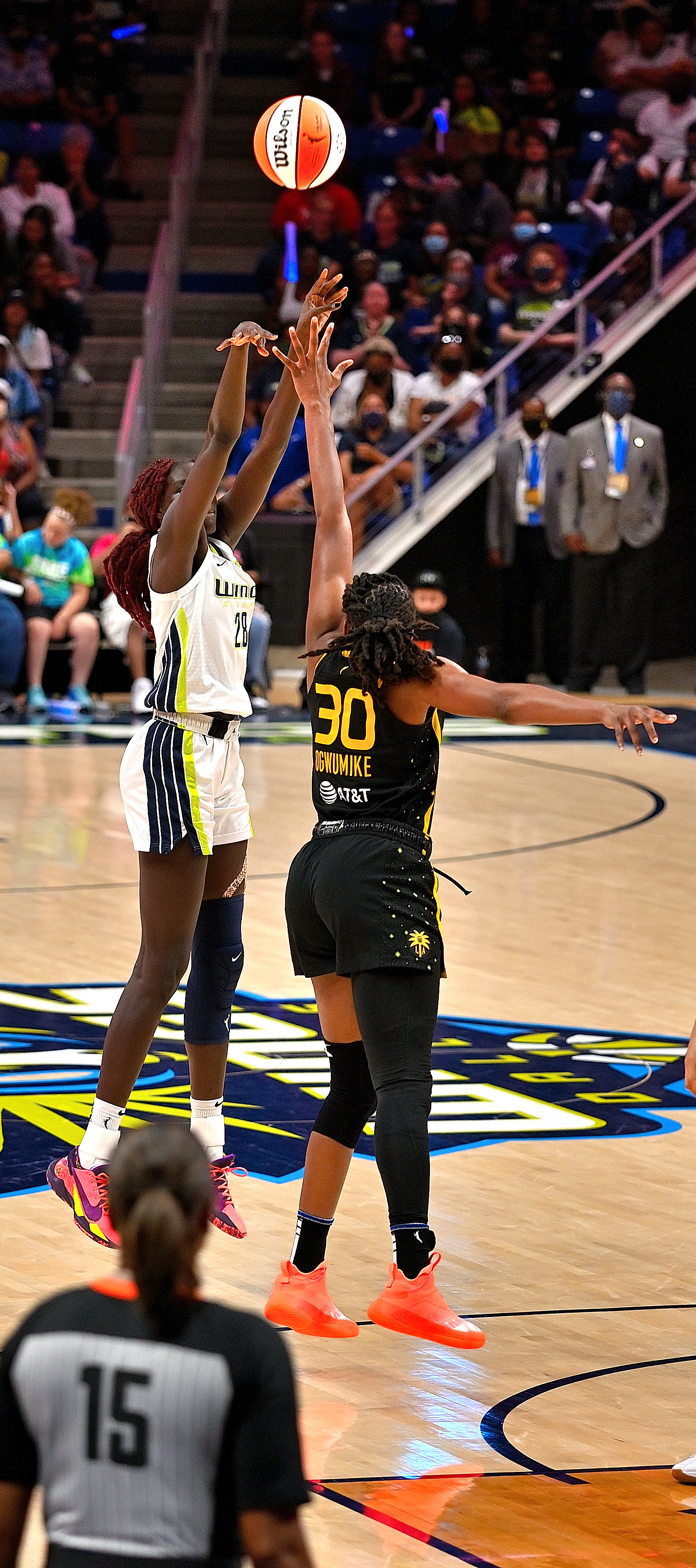
Ogwumike (right) plays defense against Awak Kuier (left) during a 2021 WNBA game.

To start off 2018, Ogwumike scored a season-high 25 points in an 87–70 victory over the Indiana Fever. Later on in the season, Ogwumike was voted into the 2018 WNBA All-Star Game but would miss the game due to fatigue, which kept her sidelined for over a week in mid July. Ogwumike made her return on August 2, 2018, against the Minnesota Lynx and scored 15 points in a 79–57 victory. Ogwumike finished off the season averaging 15.5 ppg. The Sparks finished 19–15 with the number 6 seed in the league. In the first round elimination game, they defeated the championship-defending Minnesota Lynx 75–68. In the second round elimination game, the Sparks lost 96–64 to the Washington Mystics.

On July 4, 2019, Ogwumike scored a season-high 31 points along with 10 rebounds in a 98–81 victory over the Washington Mystics. Ogwumike would be voted into the 2019 WNBA All-Star Game, making it her 6th all-star appearance. The Sparks finished off the season as the number 3 seed with a 22–12 record, receiving a bye to the second round. In the second round elimination game, the Sparks defeated the defending champions Seattle Storm 92–69. In the semi-finals, the Sparks were eliminated in a three-game sweep by the Connecticut Sun.

In 2020, the season was delayed and shortened to 22 games in a bubble at IMG Academy due to the COVID-19 pandemic. On September 12, 2020, Ogwumike scored a season-high 24 points in an 84–70 loss to the Las Vegas Aces. Ogwumike played 18 of the 22 games (sitting out 4 games with a back injury). The Sparks finished the season 15–7 as the number 3 seed, receiving a bye to the second round, but were once again eliminated by the Connecticut Sun in the elimination game, Ogwumike was unable to play for the game due to an illness.

In January 2021, Ogwumike re-signed with the Sparks to a multi-year deal. During the 2021 season. the WNBA's 25th, she was named to The W25 as one of the top 25 players in league history, and at the end of the season was selected for the WNBA's Kim Perrot Sportsmanship Award for the third consecutive year.

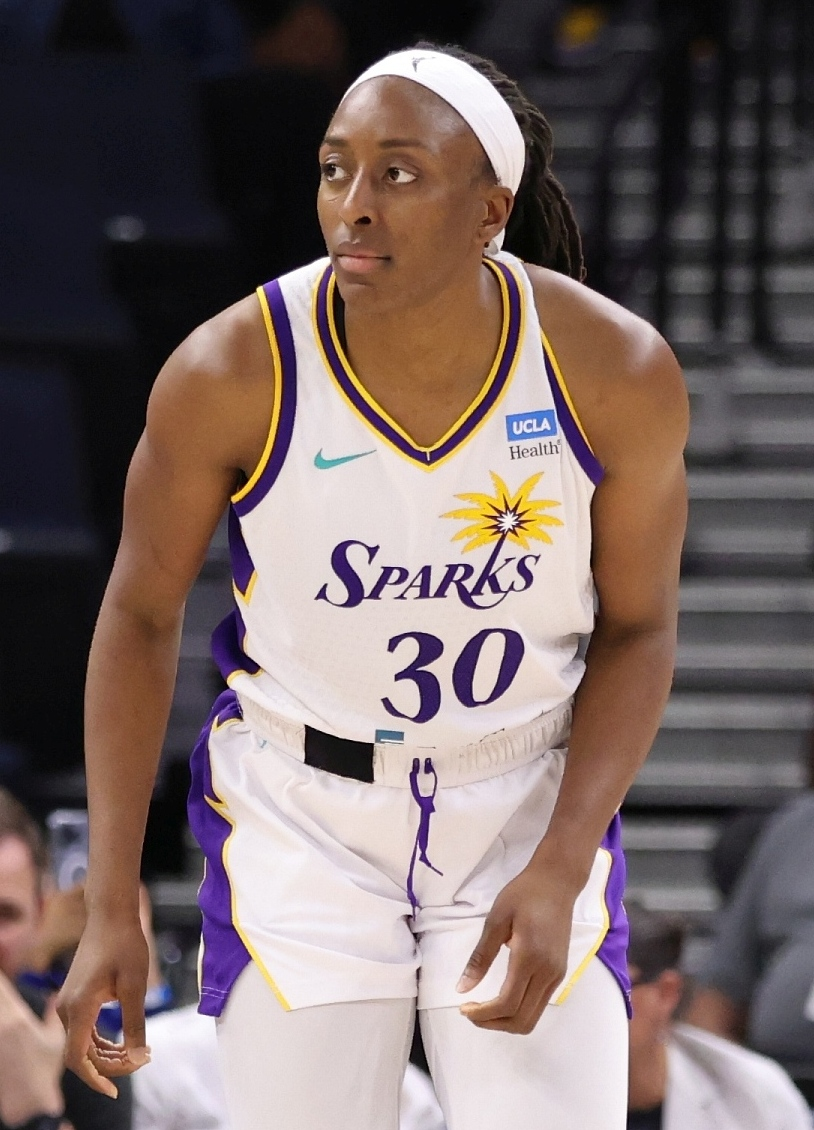
Ogwumike with the Los Angeles Sparks in 2023

=== Seattle Storm (2024–2026) ===
On February 5, 2024, Ogwumike signed a one-year contract with the Seattle Storm.

On February 8, 2025, Ogwumike re-signed with Seattle for one more year.

The New York Times (The Athletic) named Ogwumike as one of the 20 most admired leaders in sports from 2025, quoting professor Jennifer Lerner on Ogwumike's "sustained elite performance with low ego and low theatrics". Lerner also praised her "labor leadership skills and long-horizon institutional thinking".

=== Return to the Sparks and retirement ===
In 2026, during the brief free agency period, Ogwumike returned to the Sparks with a one year contract. On August 19, 2026, she announced that she would retire at the end of the 2026 WNBA season.

== Overseas career ==
In the 2012–13 off-season, Ogwumike played in Poland for CCC Polkowice and won a championship with the team. In the 2013–2014 off-season, she played in China for Guangdong Vermilion Birds. In the 2014–2018 off-seasons, Ogwumike played in Russia for Dynamo Kursk and won the 2017 Euroleague with the club. She returned to Guangdong in 2019.

In November 2025, Ogwumike became the first player publicly attached to the Project B women's professional basketball league.

== Personal life ==
Ogwumike was born in Cypress, Texas. She is the eldest of sisters who also play basketball: Chiney of the Los Angeles Sparks, and Erica and Olivia of the Rice University Owls. Youngest sister Erica attended University of Texas Southwestern Medical School after playing for Rice and is currently a dermatologist.

She is Catholic.

=== Philanthropy ===
In February 2024, Ogwumike joined the WNBA Changemakers Collective and their collaboration with VOICEINSPORT (VIS) as a mentor, "aimed at keeping girls in sport and developing diverse leaders on the court and beyond the game."

In August 2024, Ogwumike took over leadership of the non-profit voting rights organization, More Than a Vote, founded by LeBron James in 2020. Ogwumike has recruited several female athletes to join the organization and has committed to shifting its focus to women's reproductive rights for the 2024 election cycle.

== Career statistics ==
Legend
GP	Games played	GS	Games started	MPG	Minutes per game	RPG	Rebounds per game
APG	Assists per game	SPG	Steals per game	BPG	Blocks per game	PPG	Points per game
TO	Turnovers per game	FG%	Field-goal percentage	3P%	3-point field-goal percentage	FT%	Free-throw percentage
**Bold**	Career best	°	League leader

†	Denotes seasons in which Ogwumike won a WNBA championship

=== WNBA ===
==== Regular season ====
WNBA regular season statistics
Year	Team	GP	GS	MPG	FG%	3P%	FT%	RPG	APG	SPG	BPG	TO	PPG
2012	Los Angeles	33	33	27.9	.535	.143	.734	7.5	1.2	1.3	.8	**1.2**	14.0
2013	Los Angeles	34	34	25.8	.566	.400	.826	7.6	1.3	1.4	.9	1.9	14.6
2014	Los Angeles	33	33	27.6	.520	.300	.873	7.1	1.5	1.7	.4	2.0	15.8
2015	Los Angeles	24	23	**32.7**	.525	.083	.866	7.0	2.0	1.0	.5	1.8	15.8
2016^{†}	Los Angeles	33	33	31.6	**.665**°	**.615**	.869	**9.1**	**3.1**	1.2	**1.1**	2.1	**19.7**
2017	Los Angeles	34	34	30.9	.561	.340	.870	7.7	2.1	1.8	.5	1.5	18.8
2018	Los Angeles	27	27	30.8	.525	.346	.816	6.8	2.0	1.5	.4	1.4	15.5
2019	Los Angeles	32	32	27.9	.510	.338	.828	8.8	1.8	1.8	.4	1.8	16.1
2020	Los Angeles	18	18	26.2	.569	.500	.837	4.8	1.7	1.1	.2	1.6	13.3
2021	Los Angeles	18	18	31.7	.532	.367	.800	6.5	2.7	1.4	.3	2.2	14.5
2022	Los Angeles	34	34	31.4	.544	.368	.826	6.6	2.0	1.7	.4	1.8	18.1
2023	Los Angeles	36	36	31.1	.512	.339	.870	8.8	2.7	1.7	.7	2.2	19.1
2024	Seattle	37	37	31.8	.511	.405	**.876**	7.6	2.3	**1.9**	.5	1.4	16.7
2025	Seattle	**44**	**44**	30.9	.519	.367	.822	7.0	2.3	1.1	.4	1.9	18.3
2026	Los Angeles	43	43	30.9	.516	.387	.855	9.0	**3.1**	1.2	.3	1.8	17.3
**Career**	15 years, 2 teams	480	479	30.0	.537	.371	.840	7.6	2.1	1.5	.6	1.8	16.8
**Career**	All-Star	10	3	19.2	.681	.118	.333	6.7	2.4	.2	.1	1.3	12.7

==== Playoffs ====
WNBA playoff statistics
Year	Team	GP	GS	MPG	FG%	3P%	FT%	RPG	APG	SPG	BPG	TO	PPG
2012	Los Angeles	4	4	25.8	.552	—	.400	5.3	.5	1.0	.8	1.2	9.0
2013	Los Angeles	3	3	30.3	.419	—	.909	**11.7**	1.0	.7	.0	2.0	12.0
2014	Los Angeles	2	2	30.0	**.667**	—	**1.000**	6.0	1.0	.5	.0	3.0	13.0
2015	Los Angeles	3	3	30.7	.600	—	.833	4.3	2.0	1.0	.3	2.3	11.7
2016^{†}	Los Angeles	**9**	**9**	31.4	.625	.222	.763	9.3	2.6	2.0	**1.1**	2.8	17.9
2017	Los Angeles	8	8	31.5	.482	.100	.744	8.8	1.5	2.1	.1	1.7	14.0
2018	Los Angeles	2	2	33.8	.400	—	.733	4.0	1.5	1.5	.5	2.5	13.5
2019	Los Angeles	4	4	29.1	.592	.400	.857	7.3	1.8	1.2	.5	2.0	**18.0**
2024	Seattle	2	2	**37.0**	.324	.222	**1.000**	10.0	2.0	**3.0**°	.5	**.5**	14.5
2025	Seattle	3	3	31.0	.429	**.545**	.900	9.0	**2.7**	.7	.0	1.7	17.0
**Career**	10 years, 2 teams	40	40	30.8	.521	.295	.779	8.0	1.8	1.5	.5	2.1	14.6

=== College ===
NCAA statistics
Year	Team	GP	GS	MPG	FG%	3P%	FT%	RPG	APG	SPG	BPG	TO	PPG
2008–09	Stanford	**38**	14	21.0	**.629**	—	.702	6.1	1.0	.4	.3	2.1	10.6
2009–10	Stanford	**38**	**38**	**30.4**	.598	.000	.761	9.9	1.4	.9	.5	2.1	18.5
2010–11	Stanford	33	33	28.8	.586	.222	.757	7.6	1.2	.9	.6	**1.4**	17.5
2011–12	Stanford	36	36	30.0	.547	**.235**	**.830**	**10.2**	**1.8**	**1.4**	**1.1**	2.2	**22.5**
**Career**		145	121	27.5	.591	.109	.762	8.5	1.3	.9	.6	2.0	17.2

== Awards and honors ==
- 2021 The W25
- 2021 Kim Perrot Sportsmanship Award
- 2021 WNBA All-Star as member of Team USA
- 2020 Kim Perrot Sportsmanship Award
- 2019 Kim Perrot Sportsmanship Award
- 2019 All-WNBA Second Team
- 2019 WNBA All-Star
- 2018 WNBA Cares Community Assist Award
- 2018 WNBA All-Star
- 2017 All-WNBA Second Team
- 2017 WNBA All-Defensive First Team
- 2017 WNBA All-Star
- 2016 WNBA Champion
- 2016 WNBA MVP
- 2016 All-WNBA First Team
- 2016 WNBA All-Defensive First Team
- 2015 WNBA All-Defensive First Team
- 2015 WNBA all star
- 2014 All WNBA Second Team
- 2014 WNBA all star
- 2013 WNBA all star
- 2012 Naismith Finalist
- 2012 WNBA Rookie of the Year
- 2012 Wooden AwardFinalist
- 2012 Wade Trophy Finalist
- 2012 AP All-America 1st Team
- 2012 Pac-12 Player of the Year
- 2012 Pac-12 All-Defensive Team
- 2012 Pac-12 Tournament MOP
- 2012 Fresno Regional MVP
- 2011 Naismith Finalist
- 2011 Wooden Award Finalist
- 2011 Wade Trophy Finalist
- 2011 AP All-America 2nd Team
- 2011 All-Pac-10 Team
- 2011 Pac-10 All-Defensive Team
- 2011 Pac-10 Tournament MOP
- 2011 Spokane Regional MVP
- 2010 AP All-America 2nd Team
- 2010 All-Final Four Team
- 2010 Sacramento Regional MVP
- 2010 Pac-10 Tournament MOP
- 2010 Pac-10 Player of the Year (both coaches and media)
- 2009 Pac-10 All-Tournament Team
- 2009 Pac-10 All-Freshman Team
- 2008 MaxPreps National Girls Athlete of the Year
- 2008 Gatorade National Player of the Year
- 2008 Texas Gatorade Player of the Year
- 2008 Co-Parade Magazine National Player of the Year
- 2008 McDonald's All-American Game Starter
- 2008 WBCA All-American Game West MVP
- 2008 EA Sports First Team
- 2008 Texas Ms. Basketball
- 2007 Texas Gatorade Player of the Year
- 2007 MVP End of the Trail
- 2007 Second Team Parade Magazine All-America
- 2007 First Team EA Sports All-America
- 2007 Texas Ms. Basketball
- 2006 Street and Smith All-America Honorable Mention
- 2006 Adidas Top Ten Underclass All-Star
- 2006 TGCA 5A All-State First Team
- 2006 All-Metro First Team
- Ranked 6th best player in class by ESPN HoopGurlz
- Ranked 4th best player in the class by Blue Star Basketball
- Ranked 3rd best player by Rise Magazine
- Ranked 2nd best player in the class by ASGR
