= Washington State Cougars women's basketball =

2026–27 Washington State Cougars women's basketball team
- University: Washington State University
- Head coach: Kamie Ethridge (9th season)
- Location: Pullman, Washington
- Arena: Beasley Coliseum (capacity: 11,671)
- Conference: Pac-12
- Nickname: Cougars
- Colors: Crimson and gray

NCAA Division I tournament appearances
- 1991, 2021, 2022, 2023

AIAW tournament appearances
- 1972

Conference tournament champions
- 2023

Uniforms
Home	Away

The Washington State Cougars women's basketball team represents Washington State University in women's basketball. The school competes as a member of the Pac-12 Conference in Division I of the National Collegiate Athletic Association (NCAA). The Cougars play at Beasley Coliseum near the campus in Pullman, Washington.

== Season-by-season record ==
The Cougars had a 649–902 all-time record as of the end of the 2025–26 season, with a 191–489 record in the Pacific 10/12 Conference and a 297–582 overall record for conferences.

Season	Record	Conference record	Coach	Conference	Postseason finish
1970–71	11–1	6–1	Dorothea Coleman	n/a	None
1971–72	11–4	6–2	Sue Durant	n/a	AIAW first round
1972–73	11–2	8–11	Linda Hackbarth	n/a	None
1973–74	12–3	9–2	Sue Durant	NCWSA	None
1974–75	13–7	10–4	Sue Durant	NCWSA	None
1975–76	9–16	3–7	Sue Durant	NCWSA	None
1976–77	16–8	4–5	Sue Durant	n/a	None
1977–78	19–5	11–2	Sue Durant	NWBL	None
1978–79	21–5	8–3	Sue Durant	NWBL	None
1979–80	6–21	3–9	Sue Durant	NWBL	None
1980–81	12–16	4–8	Sue Durant	NWBL	None
1981–82	15–14	8–7	Sue Durant	NWBL	None
1982–83	5–22	1–11	Harold Rhodes	NorPac	None
1983–84	7–18	2–10	Harold Rhodes	NorPac	None
1984–85	9–17	3–8	Harold Rhodes	NorPac	None
1985–86	11–17	4–8	Harold Rhodes	NorPac	None
1986–87	10–18	2–16	Harold Rhodes	Pacific-10	None
1987–88	11–17	6–12	Harold Rhodes	Pacific-10	None
1988–89	13–15	6–12	Harold Rhodes	Pacific-10	None
1989–90	17–11	9–9	Harold Rhodes	Pacific-10	None
1990–91	18–11	10–8	Harold Rhodes	Pacific-10	NCAA first round
1991–92	12–15	5–3	Harold Rhodes	Pacific-10	None
1992–93	7–20	3–15	Harold Rhodes	Pacific-10	None
1993–94	8–19	3–15	Harold Rhodes	Pacific-10	None
1994–95	16–11	9–9	Harold Rhodes	Pacific-10	None
1995–96	17–12	8–10	Harold Rhodes	Pacific-10	None
1996–97	10–17	4–14	Harold Rhodes	Pacific-10	None
1997–98	12–15	6–12	Harold Rhodes	Pacific-10	None
1998–99	11–16	5–13	Harold Rhodes	Pacific-10	None
1999-00	4–24	1–17	Jenny Przekwas	Pacific-10	None
2000–01	11–17	6–12	Jenny Przekwas	Pacific-10	None
2001–02	2–27	0–18	Jenny Przekwas	Pacific-10	None
2002–03	2–26	1–17	Sherri Murrell	Pacific-10	None
2003–04	6–22	2–16	Sherri Murrell	Pacific-10	None
2004–05	6–22	2–16	Sherri Murrell	Pacific-10	None
2005–06	8–20	2–16	Sherri Murrell	Pacific-10	None
2006–07	5–24	1–17	Sherri Murrell	Pacific-10	None
2007–08	5–25	2–16	June Daugherty	Pacific-10	None
2008–09	11–19	4–14	June Daugherty	Pacific-10	None
2009–10	8–22	3–15	June Daugherty	Pacific-10	None
2010–11	8–23	6–12	June Daugherty	Pacific-10	None
2011–12	13–20	5–13	June Daugherty	Pac-12	None
2012–13	11–20	6–12	June Daugherty	Pac-12	None
2013–14	17–17	9–9	June Daugherty	Pac-12	WNIT first round
2014–15	17–15	7–11	June Daugherty	Pac-12	WNIT first round
2015–16	14–16	5–13	June Daugherty	Pac-12	None
2016–17	16–20	6–12	June Daugherty	Pac-12	WNIT semifinal
2017–18	10–20	3–14	June Daugherty	Pac-12	None
2018–19	9–21	4–14	Kamie Ethridge	Pac-12	None
2019–20	11–20	4–14	Kamie Ethridge	Pac-12	None
2020–21	12–10	9–10	Kamie Ethridge	Pac-12	NCAA first round
2021–22	19–11	11–6	Kamie Ethridge	Pac-12	NCAA first round
2022–23	23–11	9–9	Kamie Ethridge	Pac-12	NCAA first round
2023–24	21–15	7–11	Kamie Ethridge	Pac-12	WBIT semifinal
2024–25	21–14	14–6	Kamie Ethridge	WCC	WNIT Super 16
2025–26	9–25	6–12	Kamie Ethridge	WCC	None

== Postseason results ==
=== NCAA Division I ===
The Cougars have appeared in four NCAA Tournaments, with a combined record of 0–4.

Year	Seed	Round	Opponent	Result
1991	11	First round	(6) Northwestern	L 62–82
2021	9	First round	(8) South Florida	L 53–57
2022	8	First round	(9) Kansas State	L 40–50
2023	5	First round	(12) Florida Gulf Coast	L 63–74

=== AIAW Division I ===
The Cougars have made one appearance in the AIAW National Division I basketball tournament, with a combined record of 0–2.

Year	Round	Opponent	Result
1972	First round Consolation first round	Illinois State; Utah State	L 43–50; L 37–40
