= Washington Huskies women's basketball =

American college basketball team

2026–27 Washington Huskies women's basketball team
- University: University of Washington
- Head coach: Tina Langley (6th season)
- Location: Seattle, Washington
- Arena: Hec Edmundson Pavilion (capacity: 10,000)
- Conference: Big Ten
- Nickname: Huskies
- Colors: Purple and gold
- Student section: Dawg Pack

NCAA Division I tournament Final Four
- 2016
Other NCAA Division I tournament results
Elite Eight	1990, 2001, 2016
Sweet Sixteen	1988, 1990, 1991, 1995, 2001, 2016, 2017
Appearances	1985, 1986, 1987, 1988, 1989, 1990, 1991, 1993, 1994, 1995, 1997, 1998, 2001, 2003, 2006, 2007, 2015, 2016, 2017, 2025, 2026

AIAW tournament appearances
- 1978

Conference tournament champions
- NorPac; 1985

Conference regular-season champions
- 1985, 1986, 1988, 1990, 2001

Uniforms
Home	Away	Alternate

The Washington Huskies women's basketball team represents the University of Washington in NCAA Division I college basketball competing in the Big Ten Conference. Their home games are played at Alaska Airlines Arena at Hec Edmundson Pavilion, located in Seattle.

== Alaska Airlines Arena at Hec Edmundson Pavilion ==
Alaska Airlines Arena at Hec Edmundson Pavilion is the home for the Husky men's and women's basketball teams, volleyball team and gymnastics squad. Originally completed in 1927, Hec Edmundson Pavilion underwent a $40 million, 19-month renovation between March 1999 and November 2000 to reconfigure its interior. The pavilion's name was also changed; originally slated to be "Seafirst Arena at Hec Edmundson Pavilion" when the deal was finalized in 1998, it became "Bank of America Arena at Hec Edmundson Pavilion" at the reopening, as B of A had eliminated the Seafirst brand in 2000. The ten-year sponsorship with the bank expired after the 2009–10 season and was not renewed; during the first half of the 2010–11 basketball season the venue was sponsorless and once again known simply as "Hec Edmundson Pavilion." On January 20, 2011, the university approved Seattle-based Alaska Airlines as the new sponsor of Hec Ed.

== History ==
Prior to the formalisation of the contemporary Huskies team, women have been playing basketball at the University of Washington since as early as 1896, similar to the timing when men began to play the sport.

The modern women's basketball program began in 1974, with Christine Burkhart serving as coach. She led the Huskies to a .500 record in her only year as head coach. Kathie Neir was the coach for the next four years, with an overall record of 82–31, and a first place finish in the NWBL Coast Division. She was replaced by Pat Dobratz, who served for one year as an interim coach, with a 14–14 record. The Huskies would go on to have winning or .500 records every year from the inception of the program until the year 2000.

Sue Kruszewski took over the coaching reins in 1980, and after leading the team to a 19–12 record, she was nominated for coach of the year honors. While she did not win the top position, she was one of 20 contenders for the honor. After her departure, Joyce Sake took over as head coach. In her second year, the team achieved a record of 26–2, winning the Norpac conference regular season with a perfect 11–0 record, as well as the conference tournament. The team was invited to their first ever appearance in the NCAA Tournament. The team earned their first AP ranking, finishing the 1985 season ranked 11th.

In 1985, Chris Gobrecht took over as head coach, and would remain in that position for 11 years. The Huskies exceeded 20 victories in eight of the 11 years. The team won the NorPac regular season outright in 1986, and finished first or tied for first in the 1988 and 1990 seasons. The team earned bids to the NCAA Tournament in nine of the 11 seasons, reaching the Sweet Sixteen in 1988 and the quarterfinals in 1990. The team earned top 25 rankings in the Coaches and AP polls in six of the 11 years, reaching a final season ranking of third place in 1990.

June Daugherty followed Gobrecht, also serving as head coach for 11 years. The Huskies had only one losing seasons in the 11-year period, exceeding 20 wins twice, once in 2001 when the team reached the NCAA quarterfinals. Tia Jackson replaced Daugherty, and remained for four years. Kevin McGuff was hired in 2011 and led the team to consecutive 20-win seasons, and two post-season WNIT bids. After McGuff was hired by Ohio State, assistant coach Mike Neighbors was named head coach for the 2013–14 season. While McGuff was head coach, he persuaded Adia Barnes, with college experience at Arizona and professional experience with the Houston Comets, Seattle Storm, Minnesota Lynx, and Sacramento Monarchs to become an assistant coach. She remained in that position under Neighbors until leaving for her alma mater—Arizona—in 2016. Neighbors left after the 2016–17 season to return to Arkansas, his alma mater.

Jody Wynn was named head coach on April 14, 2017 after serving as the head coach at Long Beach State for the previous eight seasons.

== Year by year results ==
Season	Team	Overall	Conference	Standing	Postseason	Coaches' poll	AP poll
Christine Burkhart (Independent) (1974–1975)
1974–75	Christine Burkhart	11–11	–		NCWSA Regional Playoffs		
Christine Burkhart:		11–11	–				
Kathy Neir (Independent, NWBL) (1975–1979)
1975–76	Kathy Neir	17–11	–		NCWSA Area Playoffs		
1976–77	Kathy Neir	22–4	–		NCWSA Regional Playoffs		
1977–78	Kathy Neir	26–5	12–1	1st (NWBL-Coast Division)	AIAW first round		
1978–79	Kathy Neir	17–11	4–8	4th (NWBL-Coast Division)			
Kathy Neir:		82–31	16–9				
Pat Dobratz (Independent, NWBL) (1979–1980)
1979–80	Pat Dobratz	14–14	5–8	3rd (NWBL-Coast Division)			
Pat Dobratz:		14–14	5–8				
Sue Kruzewski (Independent, NWBL, NorPac) (1980–1983)
1980–81	Sue Kruzewski	19–12	6–5	3rd (NWBL-Coast Division)	AIAW Region Championships		
1981–82	Sue Kruzewski	16–10	0–4	3rd (NWBL-Open Division)			
1982–83	Sue Kruzewski	15–12	7–5	4th (NorPac)			
Sue Kruzewski:		50–34	13–14				
Joyce Sake (NorPac) (1983–1985)
1983–84	Joyce Sake	17–8	8–4	4th			
1984–85	Joyce Sake	26–2	11–0	1st#	NCAA First Round		11
Joyce Sake:		43–10	19–4				
Chris Gobrecht (NorPac, Pac-10) (1985–1996)
1985–86	Chris Gobrecht	24–6	11–2	1st (NorPac)	NCAA Second Round (Play-In)		
Pacific-10 conference
1986–87	Chris Gobrecht	23–7	14–4	2nd (Pac-10)	NCAA Second Round (Play-In)	18	20
1987–88	Chris Gobrecht	25–5	16–2	1st	NCAA Sweet Sixteen	16	11
1988–89	Chris Gobrecht	23–10	15–3	2nd	NCAA Second Round (Play-In)		
1989–90	Chris Gobrecht	28–3	17–1	T-1st	NCAA Elite Eight	7	3
1990–91	Chris Gobrecht	24–5	15–3	2nd	NCAA Sweet Sixteen	13	12
1991–92	Chris Gobrecht	17–11	9–9	6th			
1992–93	Chris Gobrecht	17–12	11–7	3rd	NCAA Second Round (Play-In)		
1993–94	Chris Gobrecht	21–8	12–6	4th	NCAA Second Round	21	18
1994–95	Chris Gobrecht	25–9	13–5	2nd	NCAA Sweet Sixteen	13	14
1995–96	Chris Gobrecht	16–13	10–8	T-3rd			
Chris Gobrecht:		243–89	143–50				
June Daugherty (Pac-10) (1996–2007)
1996–97	June Daugherty	17–11	12–6	T-4th	NCAA First Round		
1997–98	June Daugherty	18–10	9–9	5th	NCAA First Round		
1998–99	June Daugherty	16–13	11–7	5th	WNIT Third Round		
1999–2000	June Daugherty	8–22	4–14	9th			
2000–01	June Daugherty	22–10	12–6	T-1st	NCAA Elite Eight	14	
2001–02	June Daugherty	19–12	12–6	T-2nd	WNIT Quarterfinals		
2002–03	June Daugherty	22–8	13–5	T-2nd	NCAA First Round		
2003–04	June Daugherty	18–13	9–9	6th	WNIT Third Round		
2004–05	June Daugherty	14–16	9–9	7th			
2005–06	June Daugherty	19–11	11–7	T-4th	NCAA Second Round		
2006–07	June Daugherty	18–13	11–7	4th	NCAA First Round		
June Daugherty:		191–139	113–85				
Tia Jackson (Pac-10) (2007–2011)
2007–08	Tia Jackson	13–18	8–10	6th			
2008–09	Tia Jackson	8–22	3–15	10th			
2009–10	Tia Jackson	13–18	7–11	T-6th	WBI Quarterfinals		
2010–11	Tia Jackson	11–17	6–12	7th			
Tia Jackson:		45–75	24–48				
Kevin McGuff (Pac-12) (2011–2013)
2011–12	Kevin McGuff	20–14	8–10	7th	WNIT Quarterfinals		
2012–13	Kevin McGuff	21–12	11–8	5th	WNIT Second Round		
Kevin McGuff:		41–26	19–18				
Mike Neighbors (Pac-12) (2013–2017)
2013–14	Mike Neighbors	20–14	10–8	6th	WNIT semifinals		
2014–15	Mike Neighbors	23–10	11–7	5th	NCAA first round		
2015–16	Mike Neighbors	26–11	11–7	5th	NCAA Final Four	8	RV
2016–17	Mike Neighbors	29–6	15–3	T-2nd	NCAA Sweet Sixteen	11	12
Mike Neighbors:		98–41	47–25				
Jody Wynn (Pac-12) (2017–2021)
2017–18	Jody Wynn	7–23	1–17	12th			
2018–19	Jody Wynn	11–21	2–15	11th			
2019–20	Jody Wynn	13–16	5–13	T-9th			
2020–21	Jody Wynn	7–13	3–13	11th			
Jody Wynn:		25–57	6–45				
Tina Langley (Pac-12 and Big Ten) (2021–Present)
2021–22	Tina Langley	7–16	2–12	12th			
2022–23	Tina Langley	19–15	7–11	T-8th	WNIT Fab 4		
2023–24	Tina Langley	16–15	6–12	10th	WBIT First Round		
2024–25	Tina Langley	19–14	9–9	12th	NCAA first round		
2025–26	Tina Langley	22–11	10-8	8th	NCAA second round	25	RV
Tina Langley:		83–71	34–52				
Total:		858–523 (.621)					
National champion Postseason invitational champion Conference regular season champion Conference regular season and conference tournament champion Division regular season champion Division regular season and conference tournament champion Conference tournament champion

== Postseason results ==
=== NCAA Division I ===
The Huskies have appeared in the NCAA Division I women's basketball tournament 21 times. They have a combined record of 22–21.

Year	Seed	Round	Opponent	Result
1985	#3	First Round	#6 UCLA	L 62–78
1986	#7	First Round; Second Round	#10 North Texas State #2 Louisiana Tech	W 69–54; L 54–79
1987	#8	First Round; Second Round	#9 New Mexico State #1 Long Beach State	W 86–73; L 57–72
1988	#3	Second Round; Sweet Sixteen	#6 New Mexico State #2 Long Beach State	W 99–74; L 78–104
1989	#5	First Round; Second Round	#12 Hawaii #4 Stephen F. Austin	W 87–79; L 63–73
1990	#1	Second Round; Sweet Sixteen; Elite Eight	#8 DePaul #5 South Carolina #2 Auburn	W 77–68; W 73–61; L 50–76
1991	#3	Second Round; Sweet Sixteen	#6 Iowa #2 Stanford	W 70–53; L 47–73
1993	#7	First Round; Second Round	#10 Montana State #2 Texas Tech	W 80–51; L 64–70
1994	#8	First Round; Second Round	#9 Boise State #1 Purdue	W 89–61; L 59–86
1995	#3	First Round; Second Round; Sweet Sixteen	#14 Ohio #6 Arkansas #2 Texas Tech	W 73–57; W 54–50; L 52–67
1997	#11	First Round	#6 Vanderbilt	L 62–74
1998	#13	First Round	#4 Purdue	L 71–88
2001	#6	First Round; Second Round; Sweet Sixteen; Elite Eight	#11 Old Dominion #3 Florida #2 Oklahoma #5 SW Missouri State	W 67–65; W 86–75; W 84–67; L 87–104
2003	#9	First Round	#8 Wisconsin–Green Bay	L 65–78
2006	#9	First Round; Second Round	#8 Minnesota #1 LSU	W 73–69; L 49–72
2007	#11	First Round	#6 Iowa State	L 60–79
2015	#6	First Round	#11 Miami (FL)	L 80–86
2016	#7	First Round; Second Round; Sweet Sixteen; Elite Eight; Final Four	#10 Penn #2 Maryland #3 Kentucky #4 Stanford #4 Syracuse	W 65–53; W 74–65; W 85–72; W 85–76; L 59–80
2017	#3	First Round; Second Round; Sweet Sixteen	#14 Montana State #6 Oklahoma #2 Mississippi State	W 91–63; W 108–82; L 64–75
2025	#11	First Four	#11 Columbia	L 60–63
2026	#6	First Round; Second Round	#11 South Dakota State #3 TCU	W 72–54; L 59–62 (OT)

=== AIAW Division I ===
The Huskies made one appearance in the AIAW National Division I basketball tournament, with a combined record of 0–1.

Year	Round	Opponent	Result
1978	First Round	Stephen F. Austin	L 55–96

== School records ==
Active players in italics.

=== Career leaders ===
Stat	Player	Career	Record	Notes
Points	Kelsey Plum	2013–2017	3,527	
Rebounds	Chantel Osahor	2013–2017	1,253	
Steals	Leteia Hughley	1982–1985	342	
Assists	Giuliana Mendiola	2001–2004	612	
Field goals made	Kelsey Plum	2013–2017	1,136	
Field goal percentage	Karen Murray	1980–1984	.541	
Three-pointers	Kelsey Plum	2013–2017	343	
Three-point percentage	Laura Moore	1990–1993	.424	113 games
Free throws made	Kelsey Plum	2013–2017	1,136	
Free throws percentage	Kelsey Plum	2013–2017	.888	
Blocked shots	Talia Walton	2012–2016	177	133 games

=== Single-season leaders ===
Stat	Player	Career	Record	Year	Notes
Points	Kelsey Plum	2013–2017	1,109	2017	
Rebounds	Chantel Osahor	2013–2017	519	2017	
Assists	Giuliana Mendiola	2001–2004	172	2004	
Steals	Margie Nielsen		102	1978	
Field goals made	Kelsey Plum	2013–2017	379	2017	
Field goal percentage	Karen Deden	1987–1991	.567	1989	
Three-pointers	Kelsey Plum	2013–2017	115	2017	
Three-point percentage	Kayla Burt	2002–2006	.538	2003	
Free throws made	Kelsey Plum	2013–2017	274	2016	
Free throws percentage	Kelsey Plum	2013–2017	.896	2015	
Blocked shots	Liz Chicane	2012–2016	74	1981	

=== Single-game leaders ===
Stat	Player	Career	Record	Date	Notes
Points	Kelsey Plum	2013–2017	57	February 25, 2017	vs. Utah
Rebounds	Chantel Osahor	2013–2017	30	January 22, 2017	at Washington St.
Assists	Leteia Hughley	1982–1985	13	December 16, 1983	
Steals	Julia Gray		11	November 24, 1998	
Blocked shots	Margie Nielsen		9	January 23, 1978	vs. Alaska-Anchorage

== Retired numbers ==
Washington Huskies retired numbers
No.	Player	Tenure	No. ret.	Ref.
10	Kelsey Plum	2013–2017	January 18, 2025	
