= 2016 WNBA playoffs =

Professional women's basketball tournament

- Dates: September 21 – October 20, 2016

Final positions
- Champions: Los Angeles Sparks
- Runners-up: Minnesota Lynx

Tournament statistics
- Attendance: 8,719 per game
- Scoring leader (s): Maya Moore (Minnesota) (22.4 PPG)

Awards
- MVP: Candace Parker (Los Angeles)

The 2016 WNBA playoffs is the postseason tournament of the WNBA's 2016 season.

== Format ==
The WNBA changed its playoff format in 2016. Following the WNBA regular season, eight teams in the entire league qualified for the playoffs and were seeded one to eight.

Regular season records determined the seedings of the teams. The team with the best record received seed one, the team with the next best record received seed two, and so on. The top two seeds get double byes, while the next two seeds get first-round byes.

These seedings were used to create a bracket that determines the match-ups throughout the playoffs. The first round of the playoffs consisted of two match-ups based on the seedings (5-8 and 6-7). The two winners advanced to the second round with a match-up between the number 3 seed and the lower of the advancing seeds and another match-up between the number 4 seed and the other first round winner. The winners of the first two rounds advanced to the semifinals, where the lower ranked seed of the winners faced the number 1 seed, while the other remaining team faced the number 2 seed.

The first two rounds are single elimination games played on the higher ranking seed's home court. The semifinals and WNBA Finals are best-of-five series played in a 2-2-1 format, meaning the team with home-court advantage (better record) hosts games 1, 2, and 5 while their opponent hosts games 3 and 4.

=== Tiebreak procedures ===
1. Better winning percentage among all head-to-head games involving tied teams.
2. Better winning percentage against teams within conference (for Finals only: better record against teams in # the opposite conference).
3. Better winning percentage against all teams with a .500 or better record at the end of the season.
4. Better point differential in games involving tied teams.
5. Coin toss (or draw of lots, if at least 3 teams are still tied after the first 4 tiebreakers fail).

== Playoff qualifying ==
Seed	Team	Record	Clinched		
Seed	Team	Record	Playoff berth	Bye to Semis	Top Record
1	Minnesota Lynx	28–6	July 25	September 6	September 12
2	Los Angeles Sparks	26–8	July 25	September 6	—
3	New York Liberty	21–13	September 7	—	—
4	Chicago Sky	18–16	September 10	—	—
5	Indiana Fever	17–17 (Note: Indiana Fever clinched #5 seed over Atlanta Dream based on a 2–1 regular season series record.)	September 10	—	—
6	Atlanta Dream	17–17	September 10	—	—
7	Seattle Storm	16–18 (Note: Seattle Storm clinched #7 seed over Phoenix Mercury based on a 2–1 regular season series record.)	September 11	—	—
8	Phoenix Mercury	16–18	September 14	—	—

== Bracket ==
**First round** Single elimination (Sept. 21)
5	Indiana Fever	78
8	**Phoenix Mercury**	**89**
6	**Atlanta Dream**	**94**
7	Seattle Storm	85

**Second round** Single elimination (Sept. 24 and 25)
3	New York Liberty	94
8	**Phoenix Mercury**	**101**
4	**Chicago Sky**	**108**
6	Atlanta Dream	98

**Semifinals**; Best-of-5 (Sept. 28 – Oct. 6)
1	**Minnesota Lynx**	**3**
8	Phoenix Mercury	0
2	**Los Angeles Sparks**	**3**
4	Chicago Sky	1

**WNBA Finals**; Best-of-5 (Oct. 9 – 20)
1	Minnesota Lynx	2
2	**Los Angeles Sparks**	**3**

Note: Teams re-seeded after the second round and semifinals.

- **Bold** – Game or series winner
- Italic – Team with home-court advantage

== First round ==
All times are in Eastern Daylight Time (UTC−4)

=== (5) Indiana Fever vs. (8) Phoenix Mercury ===
ESPNews

September 21
6:00 PM

Game 1

**Phoenix Mercury** **89**, Indiana Fever 78
Scoring by quarter: 18-18, 17-**20**, **24**-19, **30**-21
Pts: Taurasi 20; Rebs: Griner 9 Asts: Taylor 4	Pts: Coleman & Catchings 13; Rebs: Catchings 10; Asts: January 9
**Phoenix wins series 1-0**

Bankers Life Fieldhouse, Indianapolis, Indiana
Attendance: 6,282
Referees: Tom Nunez, Byron Jarrett, Maj Forsberg

Regular-season series
Indiana won 2–1 in the regular-season series

May 18, 2016

Report

Phoenix Mercury 93, **Indiana Fever** **97**

Bankers Life Fieldhouse, Indianapolis, IN

July 8, 2016

Report

**Indiana Fever 78**, Phoenix Mercury 60

Talking Stick Resort Arena, Phoenix, AZ

August 30, 2016

Report

**Phoenix Mercury 79**, Indiana Fever 65

Bankers Life Fieldhouse, Indianapolis, IN

=== (6) Atlanta Dream vs. (7) Seattle Storm ===
ESPNews

September 21
8:00 PM

Game 1

Seattle Storm 85, **Atlanta Dream** **94**
Scoring by quarter: 18–**19**, **27**–18, 21–**29**, 19-**28**
Pts: Loyd 24; Rebs: Steward & Langhorne 7 Asts: Bird 7	Pts: McCoughtry 37; Rebs: Williams 16; Asts: McCoughtry & Clarendon 7
**Atlanta wins series 1-0**

Hank McCamish Pavilion, Atlanta, Georgia
Attendance: 2,553
Referees: Eric Brewton, Amy Bonner, Jeff Wooten

Regular-season series
Seattle won 2–1 in the regular-season series

June 28, 2016

Report

Atlanta Dream 81, **Seattle Storm** **84**

KeyArena, Seattle, WA

July 5, 2016

Report

Seattle Storm 64, **Atlanta Dream 77**

Philips Arena, Atlanta, GA

September 4, 2016

Report

**Seattle Storm 91**, Atlanta Dream 82

Philips Arena, Atlanta, GA

== Second round ==
All times are in Eastern Daylight Time (UTC−4)

=== (3) New York Liberty vs. (8) Phoenix Mercury ===
NBA TV

September 24
7:00 PM

Game 1

**Phoenix Mercury** **101**, New York Liberty 94
Scoring by quarter: 25-25, **27**–16, 16–**26**, **33**-27
Pts: Taurasi 30; Rebs: Griner 10; Asts: Griner 5	Pts: Wright 21; Rebs: Charles 9 Asts: Wright & Charles 5
**Phoenix wins series 1-0**

Madison Square Garden, New York, NY
Attendance: 10,227
Referees: Michael Price, Jeff Smith, Tom Mauer, Cheryl Flores

Regular-season series
New York won 2–1 in the regular-season series

June 26, 2016

Report

**Phoenix Mercury** **104**, New York Liberty 97 (OT)

Madison Square Garden, New York, NY

July 1, 2016

Report

**New York Liberty 99**, Phoenix Mercury 88

Talking Stick Resort Arena, Phoenix, AZ

September 3, 2016

Report

Phoenix Mercury 70, **New York Liberty 92**

Madison Square Garden, New York, NY

=== (4) Chicago Sky vs. (6) Atlanta Dream ===
ESPN2

September 25
12:00 PM

Game 1

Atlanta Dream 98, **Chicago Sky** **108**
Scoring by quarter: 25-**37**, **25**–19, 20–**31**, **28**-21
Pts: Hayes 30; Rebs: Williams 9 Asts: McCoughtry 9	Pts: Vandersloot 21; Rebs: Breland 16; Asts: Vandersloot 13
**Chicago wins series 1-0**

Allstate Arena Rosemont, Illinois
Attendance: 3,922
Referees: Roy Gulbeyan, Sue Blauch, Kurt Walker

Regular-season series
Atlanta won 2–1 in the regular-season series

May 22, 2016

Report

Chicago Sky 81, **Atlanta Dream** **87**

Philips Arena, Atlanta, GA

June 17, 2016

Report

Chicago Sky 97, **Atlanta Dream 101**

Philips Arena, Atlanta, GA

August 26, 2016

Report

Atlanta Dream 82, **Chicago Sky 90**

Allstate Arena, Rosemont, IL

== Semifinals ==
All times are in Eastern Daylight Time (UTC−4)

=== (1) Minnesota Lynx vs. (8) Phoenix Mercury ===
ESPN2

September 28
8:00 PM

Game 1

Phoenix Mercury 95, **Minnesota Lynx** **113**
Scoring by quarter: 23–**24**, 15-**31**, 34-**36**, **23**–22
Pts: Taurasi 25; Rebs: Taylor 5 Asts: Dupree & Harding 5	Pts: Moore 31; Rebs: Fowles 10; Asts: Augustus & Whalen 7

Xcel Energy Center, Saint Paul, Minnesota
Attendance: 9,013
Referees: Roy Gulbeyan, Eric Brewton, Tiffany Bird

ESPNews

September 30
8:00 PM

Game 2

Phoenix Mercury 86, **Minnesota Lynx** **96**
Scoring by quarter: 24–**35**, **23**-20, 18–**22**, **21**–19
Pts: Taurasi 31; Rebs: Harrison 9 Asts: Taylor 5	Pts: Moore 26; Rebs: Brunson 11; Asts: Moore 5

Xcel Energy Center, Saint Paul, Minnesota
Attendance: 11,923
Referees: Byron Jarrett Jeff Smith, Maj Forsberg

ESPN

October 2
5:00 PM

Game 3

**Minnesota Lynx** **82**, Phoenix Mercury 67
Scoring by quarter: 18–**23**, **21**–15, **26**–15, **17**–14
Pts: Moore 20; Rebs: Brunson 9 Asts: Whalen 5	Pts: Taurasi & Bonner 12; Rebs: Griner & Harrison 7 Asts: Xargay 5
**Minnesota wins series 3-0**

Talking Stick Resort Arena, Phoenix, AZ
Attendance: 9,631
Referees: Sue Blauch, Kurt Walker, Michael Price

Regular-season series
Minnesota won 3–0 in the regular-season series

May 14, 2016

Report

Phoenix Mercury 76, **Minnesota Lynx** **95**

Target Center, Minneapolis, MN

May 25, 2016

Report

**Minnesota Lynx 85**, Phoenix Mercury 78

Talking Stick Resort Arena, Phoenix, AZ

June 7, 2016

Report

Phoenix Mercury 81, **Minnesota Lynx 89**

Target Center, Minneapolis, MN

=== (2) Los Angeles Sparks vs. (4) Chicago Sky ===
ESPN2

September 28
9:00 PM

Game 1

Chicago Sky 75, **Los Angeles Sparks** **95**
Scoring by quarter: 20–**22**, 15-**30**, **26**-23, 14-**20**
Pts: Faulkner 13; Rebs: Breland 7 Asts: Vandersloot 5	Pts: Parker 30; Rebs: Ogwumike 10; Asts: Ogwumike 6

Walter Pyramid, Long Beach, CA
Attendance: 3,894
Referees: Michael Price, Cheryl Flores, Tom Mauer

ESPNews

September 30
9:00 PM

Game 2

Chicago Sky 84, **Los Angeles Sparks** **99**
Scoring by quarter: 27–**28**, 15-**29**, 17-**21**, 25–**21**
Pts: Dos Santos 15; Rebs: Breland 9 Asts: Quigley 5	Pts: Parker, Lavender 20; Rebs: Parker 12; Asts: Parker 8

Staples Center, Los Angeles, CA
Attendance: 7,855
Referees: Eric Brewton, Amy Bonner, Billy Smith

ESPN

October 2
3:00 PM

Game 3

Los Angeles Sparks 66, **Chicago Sky** **70**
Scoring by quarter: **23**–14, 16–16, 8–**19**, 19–**21**
Pts: Ogwumike 22; Rebs: Parker 15; Asts: Parker 6	Pts: Vandersloot 17; Rebs: Boyette 11; Asts: Faulkner & Vandersloot 5

Allstate Arena Rosemont, Illinois
Attendance: 5,018
Referees: Maj Forsberg, Tom Nunez, Jeff Wooten

ESPN2

October 4
8:00 PM

Game 4

**Los Angeles Sparks** **95**, Chicago Sky 75
Scoring by quarter: **23**–11, **32**–20, 14–**28**, **26**–16
Pts: Parker 29; Rebs: Ogwumike 9 Asts: Gray 7	Pts: Pondexter 19; Rebs: Boyette 10; Asts: Young 6
**Los Angeles wins series 3-1**

Allstate Arena Rosemont, Illinois
Attendance: 3,841
Referees: Sue Blauch, Tiffany Bird, Roy Gulbeyan

Regular-season series
Los Angeles won 3–0 in the regular-season series

May 24, 2016

Report

**Los Angeles Sparks** **93**, Chicago Sky 80

Allstate Arena, Rosemont, IL

June 14, 2016

Report

Chicago Sky 85, **Los Angeles Sparks 98**

Staples Center, Los Angeles, CA

July 13, 2016

Report

**Los Angeles Sparks 77**, Chicago Sky 67

Allstate Arena, Rosemont, IL

== WNBA Finals ==
All times are in Eastern Daylight Time (UTC−4)

=== (1) Minnesota Lynx vs. (2) Los Angeles Sparks ===
ABC

October 9
3:00 PM

Game 1

**Los Angeles Sparks** **78**, Minnesota Lynx 76
Scoring by quarter: **21**–18, 13–**18**, 22–**24**, **22**–16
Pts: Toliver & Ogwumike 19; Rebs: Parker & Ogwumike 9 Asts: Gray 4	Pts: three tied 18; Rebs: Fowles 13; Asts: Whalen 6

Target Center, Minneapolis, MN
Attendance: 12,113
Referees: Maj Forsberg, Jeff Wooten, Tom Nunez

ESPN2

October 11
8:00 PM

Game 2

Los Angeles Sparks 60, **Minnesota Lynx** **79**
Scoring by quarter: 14–**18**, 11–**21**, **21**–15, 14–**25**
Pts: Ogwumike 14; Rebs: Ogwumike 12; Asts: three tied 3	Pts: Moore 21; Rebs: Fowles 15; Asts: Fowles 4

Target Center, Minneapolis, MN
Attendance: 12,832
Referees: Roy Gulbeyan, Michael Price, Billy Smith

ESPN2

October 14
9:00 PM

Game 3

Minnesota Lynx 75, **Los Angeles Sparks** **92**
Scoring by quarter: 17–**32**, **23**–16, 18–**22**, 17–**22**
Pts: Fowles, Brunson 14; Rebs: Moore 7 Asts: Moore 5	Pts: Parker 24; Rebs: Parker, Ogwumike 9 Asts: Beard 7

Galen Center, Los Angeles, CA
Attendance: 8,093
Referees: Tom Mauer, Eric Brewton, Amy Bonner

ESPN

October 16
8:30 PM

Game 4

**Minnesota Lynx** **85**, Los Angeles Sparks 79
Scoring by quarter: **22**–20, **24**–20, 19–19, 20–20
Pts: Moore 31; Rebs: Fowles 13; Asts: Augustus, Moore 5	Pts: Gray 20; Rebs: Ogwumike 8 Asts: Beard 4

Staples Center, Los Angeles, CA
Attendance: 12,885
Referees: Roy Gulbeyan, Maj Forsberg, Kurt Walker

ESPN2

October 20
8:00 PM

Game 5

**Los Angeles Sparks** **77**, Minnesota Lynx 76
Scoring by quarter: 17–**18**, 11–**16**, **26**–21, **23**–21
Pts: Parker 28; Rebs: Parker, Ogwumike 12; Asts: Beard 6	Pts: Moore 23; Rebs: Brunson, Fowles 9 Asts: Moore 11
**Los Angeles wins series 3–2**

Target Center, Minneapolis, MN
Attendance: 19,423
Referees: Amy Bonner, Eric Brewton, Thomas Nunez

Regular-season series
Minnesota won 2–1 in the regular-season series

June 21, 2016

Report

**Minnesota Lynx** **72**, Los Angeles Sparks 69

Staples Center, Los Angeles, CA

June 24, 2016

Report

**Los Angeles Sparks 94**, Minnesota Lynx 76

Target Center, Minneapolis, MN

September 6, 2016

Report

**Minnesota Lynx 77**, Los Angeles Sparks 74

Staples Center, Los Angeles, CA
