= 2016 Los Angeles Sparks season =

- WNBA champions
- Head coach: Brian Agler
- Arena: Staples Center

Results
- Record: 26–8 (.765)
- Place: 2nd (Western)
- Playoff finish: WNBA champions (Defeated Minnesota 3-2)

Media
- Television: Time Warner Cable SportsNet; ESPN2, NBATV

The 2016 Los Angeles Sparks season was the 20th season for the Los Angeles Sparks of the Women's National Basketball Association. The season tipped off on May 15 at home, against the Seattle Storm.

The Sparks started the season well, winning all five of their games in May. Three of the five wins came by double-digits, and the closest was a five-point win over Connecticut on May 26. The team continued its hot streak into June and did not lose until June 21. The three-point loss, which came at home against Minnesota, ended an eleven-game winning streak. The Sparks got revenge on Minnesota, winning three days later in Minnesota by a score of 94–76. The Sparks did not lose again in June and finished the month with a 10–1 record. The team went on a nine-game winning streak, which lasted until July 17. They then lost back-to-back games for the first time in the season, with losses coming on the road against Atlanta and Indiana. The team won its final game heading into the Olympic break to finish July 6–2. The return from the break was a rocky one with the Sparks losing both of their games in August. However, a trip to Texas to begin September saw the team return to its winning ways when they defeated San Antonio and Dallas. The Sparks lost three straight games from September 6 to September 11 before finishing the season with two wins. Their September record was 5–3 and they finished the season 26–8 overall.

The Sparks' 26–8 record earned them the second overall seed in the WNBA Playoffs and they finished two games behind top seed Minnesota. The Sparks earned a bye into the semifinals where they matched-up with fourth seed Chicago. The Sparks won the first two games at home, 95–75 and 99–84. When the series moved to Chicago, the Sparks lost Game 3 66–70. A return to Los Angeles wasn't needed as the Sparks won Game 4 95–75 to advance to the WNBA Finals and matched-up with first seed Minnesota. The series began in Minnesota and the Sparks won Game 1 78–76, but lost Game 2 60–79. The two teams again split Games 3 and 4 in Los Angeles, with the Sparks winning Game 3 92–75 and losing Game 4 79–85. In the deciding Game 5, the Sparks won in Minnesota 77–76 to secure their third WNBA title.

== Transactions ==
=== WNBA draft ===
The Sparks made three selections in the 2016 WNBA Entry Draft in Uncasville, Connecticut:

Round	Pick	Player	Nationality	WNBA Team	School/Team/Country
2	15	Whitney Knight	United States	Los Angeles Sparks from Connecticut Sun	Florida Gulf Coast
2	23	Brianna Butler	United States	Los Angeles Sparks from Connecticut Sun	Syracuse
3	29	Talia Walton	United States	Los Angeles Sparks	Washington

=== Trades and Roster Changes ===
Date	Transaction
February 11, 2016	Signed Candace Parker
February 17, 2016	Signed Nneka Ogwumike
March 1, 2016	Acquired Riquna Williams and the 6th pick in the 2016 WNBA draft from the Dallas Wings in exchange for Erin Phillips, the 5th pick in the 2016 draft and, the 11th pick in the 2017 WNBA draft.
March 31, 2016	Signed Essence Carson
April 14, 2016	Acquired Chelsea Gray, the 15th and 23rd picks in the 2016 draft, and the 4th pick in the 2017 draft from the Connecticut Sun in exchange for Jonquel Jones and the 17th pick in the 2016 draft.
May 11, 2016	Waived Talia Walton
August 30, 2016	Waived Whitney Knight

== Roster ==
2016 Los Angeles Sparks roster
Players
Coaches

Pos.	No.	Nat.	Name	Height	Weight	DOB	From	Yrs
G/F	0	(United States)	Beard, Alana	6' 1" (1.85m)	160 lb (73kg)	1982-05-14	Duke	12
F	10	(Russia)	Belyakova, Evgeniya	6' 0" (1.83m)	150 lb (68kg)	1986-06-27	Russia	R
G/F	17	(United States)	Carson, Essence	6' 0" (1.83m)	163 lb (74kg)	1986-07-28	Rutgers	8
G	23	(Serbia)	Dabović, Ana	6' 0" (1.83m)	157 lb (71kg)	1989-08-18	Serbia	1
F	28	(Montenegro)	Dubljević, Jelena	6' 3" (1.91m)	179 lb (81kg)	1987-05-07	Montenegro	R
G	12	(United States)	Gray, Chelsea	5' 11" (1.8m)	170 lb (77kg)	1992-10-08	Duke	1
F/C	7	(France)	Gruda, Sandrine	6' 4" (1.93m)	185 lb (84kg)	1987-06-25	France	4
C	42	(United States)	Lavender, Jantel	6' 4" (1.93m)	185 lb (84kg)	1988-11-12	Ohio State	5
F	30	(United States)	Ogwumike, Nneka	6' 2" (1.88m)	174 lb (79kg)	1990-07-02	Stanford	4
F/C	3	(United States)	Parker, Candace	6' 4" (1.93m)	175 lb (79kg)	1986-04-19	Tennessee	8
G	20	(United States)	Toliver, Kristi	5' 7" (1.7m)	130 lb (59kg)	1987-01-27	Maryland	7
C	21	(Belgium)	Wauters, Ann	6' 4" (1.93m)	193 lb (88kg)	1980-10-12	Belgium	8

Head coach
(United States) Brian Agler (Wittenberg)
Assistant coaches
(United States) Tonya Edwards (Tennessee)
(United States) Amber Stocks (Cincinnati)
Athletic trainer
(United States) Courtney Watson (California)
Strength and conditioning coach
(United States) Kelly Dormandy (Springfield)

Legend

- (C) Team captain
- (DP) Unsigned draft pick
- (FA) Free agent
- (S) Suspended
- Injured

== Schedule ==
=== Pre-season ===
2016 pre-season game log
Total: 3–0 (Home: 1–0; Road: 2–0)
Pre-season: 3–0 (Home: 1–0; Road: 2–0)

Game	Date	Team	Score	High points	High rebounds	High assists	Location Attendance	Record
1	May 7	Atlanta	W 88–80	Candace Parker (22)	Rebecca Tobin (10)	Gray, Dabović (4)	Pasadena College; 460	1–0
2	May 9	@ San Antonio	W 77–70	Chelsea Gray (18)	Chelsea Gray (6)	Ana Dabović (7)	AT&T Center; 2,307	2–0
3	May 10	@ Atlanta	W 69–63	Essence Carson (11)	Parker, Wauters (6)	Chelsea Gray (3)	McCamish Pavillion; 1,385	3–0

2016 season schedule

=== Regular season ===
2016 game log
Total: 26–8 (Home: 14–3 Road: 12–5)
May: 5–0 (Home: 1–0; Road: 4–0)

Game	Date	Team	Score	High points	High rebounds	High assists	Location Attendance	Record
1	May 15	Seattle	W 96–66	Candace Parker (34)	Nneka Ogwumike (7)	Parker, Toliver (4)	Staples Center; 10,591	1–0
2	May 20	@ Washington	W 97–67	Kristi Toliver (19)	Candace Parker (9)	Candace Parker (6)	Verizon Center; 7,807	2–0
3	May 21	@ New York	W 79–72	Nneka Ogwumike (25)	Nneka Ogwumike (15)	Dabović, Parker, Toliver (3)	Madison Square Garden; 9,417	3–0
4	May 24	@ Chicago	W 93–80	Candace Parker (26)	Ogwumike, Parker (9)	Kristi Toliver (10)	Allstate Arena; 5,554	4–0
5	May 26	@ Connecticut	W 77–72	Candace Parker (22)	Nneka Ogwumike (11)	Ogwumike, Parker, Toliver (4)	Mohegan Sun Arena; 4,766	5–0

June: 10–1 (Home: 7–1; Road: 3–0)

Game	Date	Team	Score	High points	High rebounds	High assists	Location Attendance	Record
6	June 2	San Antonio	W 68–61	Nneka Ogwumike (21)	Nneka Ogwumike (10)	Candace Parker (7)	Staples Center; 8,341	6–0
7	June 4	@ San Antonio	W 74–61	Candace Parker (15)	Kristi Toliver (7)	Gray, Lavender (3)	AT&T Center; 5,403	7–0
8	June 7	New York	W 100–77	Jantel Lavender (22)	Nneka Ogwumike (10)	Chelsea Gray (6)	Staples Center; 7,103	8–0
9	June 11	@ Dallas	W 97–73	Nneka Ogwumike (32)	Nneka Ogwumike (10)	Candace Parker (6)	College Park Center; 5,061	9–0
10	June 14	Chicago	W 98–85	Nneka Ogwumike (27)	Nneka Ogwumike (12)	Alana Beard (6)	Staples Center; 7,348	10–0
11	June 17	Phoenix	W 77–71	Candace Parker (24)	Candace Parker (11)	Nneka Ogwumike (5)	Staples Center; 8,964	11–0
12	June 21	Minnesota	L 69–72	Kristi Toliver (20)	Candace Parker (8)	Candace Parker (6)	Staples Center; 9,112	11–1
13	June 24	@ Minnesota	W 94–76	Kristi Toliver (25)	Ogwumike, Parker (9)	Alana Beard (7)	Target Center; 13,003	12–1
14	June 26	Connecticut	W 80–73	Nneka Ogwumike (27)	Kristi Toliver (8)	Kristi Toliver (5)	Staples Center; 9,441	13–1
15	June 28	Dallas	W 89–84	Candace Parker (31)	Candace Parker (13)	Candace Parker (7)	Staples Center; 7,823	14–1
16	June 30	Atlanta	W 84–75	Nneka Ogwumike (38)	Nneka Ogwumike (11)	Kristi Toliver (8)	Staples Center; 10,215	15–1

July: 6–2 (Home: 3–0; Road: 3–2)

Game	Date	Team	Score	High points	High rebounds	High assists	Location Attendance	Record
17	July 3	New York	W 77–67	Nneka Ogwumike (22)	Nneka Ogwumike (15)	Kristi Toliver (6)	Staples Center; 10,003	16–1
18	July 6	Indiana	W 94–88	Nneka Ogwumike (23)	Jantel Lavender (7)	Chelsea Gray (8)	Staples Center; 8,224	17–1
19	July 10	Washington	W 93–82	Candace Parker (26)	Candace Parker (11)	Candace Parker (9)	Staples Center; 19,076	18–1
20	July 13	@ Chicago	W 77–67	Nneka Ogwumike (20)	Nneka Ogwumike (11)	Candace Parker (9)	Allstate Arena; 16,444	19–1
21	July 15	@ Connecticut	W 98–92	Jantel Lavender (25)	Lavender, Ogwumike (10)	Candace Parker (7)	Mohegan Sun Arena; 6,430	20–1
22	July 17	@ Atlanta	L 74–91	Nneka Ogwumike (26)	Nneka Ogwumike (12)	Candace Parker (5)	Philips Arena; 7,551	20–2
23	July 19	@ Indiana	L 82–92	Kristi Toliver (18)	Nneka Ogwumike (14)	Nneka Ogwumike (7)	Bankers Life Fieldhouse; 7,269	20–3
24	July 22	@ Washington	W 95–75	Nneka Ogwumike (24)	Nneka Ogwumike (14)	Candace Parker (6)	Verizon Center; 5,455	21–3

August: 0–2 (Home: 0–0; Road: 0–2)

Game	Date	Team	Score	High points	High rebounds	High assists	Location Attendance	Record
25	August 26	@ Seattle	L 72–79	Nneka Ogwumike (28)	Candace Parker (10)	Candace Parker (6)	KeyArena; 9,481	21–4
26	August 28	@ Phoenix	L 66–70	Candace Parker (25)	Candace Parker (13)	Candace Parker (7)	Talking Stick Resort Arena; 11,905	21–5

September: 5–3 (Home: 3–2; Road: 2–1)

Game	Date	Team	Score	High points	High rebounds	High assists	Location Attendance	Record
27	September 1	@ San Antonio	W 70–61	Kristi Toliver (21)	Beard, Ogwumike (9)	Parker, Toliver (6)	AT&T Center; 3,992	22–5
28	September 2	@ Dallas	W 87–79	Nneka Ogwumike (28)	Nneka Ogwumike (12)	Candace Parker (5)	College Park Center; 5,176	23–5
29	September 4	Indiana	W 88–81	Nneka Ogwumike (21)	Nneka Ogwumike (6)	Nneka Ogwumike (8)	Staples Center; 11,332	24–5
30	September 6	Minnesota	L 74–77	Nneka Ogwumike (19)	Ogwumike, Parker (8)	Candace Parker (7)	Staples Center; 7,224	24–6
31	September 8	Atlanta	L 81–86	Carson, Gray, Parker (16)	Nneka Ogwumike (8)	Ana Dabović (5)	Staples Center; 6,152	24–7
32	September 11	@ Seattle	L 60–78	Candace Parker (20)	Candace Parker (10)	Alana Beard (4)	KeyArena; 9,348	24–8
33	September 13	Phoenix	W 90–85	Nneka Ogwumike (24)	Nneka Ogwumike (10)	Kristi Toliver (7)	Staples Center; 9,371	25–8
34	September 16	San Antonio	W 71–65	Nneka Ogwumike (17)	Nneka Ogwumike (10)	Nneka Ogwumike (4)	Staples Center; 13,519	26–8

2016 season schedule

=== Playoffs ===
2016 playoff game log
Semifinals vs. Chicago
Won Series: 3–1

Game	Date	Team	Score	High points	High rebounds	High assists	Location Attendance	Series
1	September 28	Chicago	W 95–75	Candace Parker (30)	Nneka Ogwumike (10)	Nneka Ogwumike (6)	Walter Pyramid; 3,894	1–0
2	September 30	Chicago	W 99–84	Lavender, Parker (20)	Candace Parker (12)	Candace Parker (8)	Staples Center; 7,855	2–0
3	October 2	@ Chicago	L 66–70	Nneka Ogwumike (22)	Candace Parker (15)	Candace Parker (6)	Allstate Arena; 5,018	2–1
4	October 4	@ Chicago	W 95–75	Candace Parker (29)	Nneka Ogwumike (9)	Chelsea Gray (7)	Allstate Arena; 3,841	3–1

Finals vs. Minnesota
Won Series: 3–2

Game	Date	Team	Score	High points	High rebounds	High assists	Location Attendance	Series
1	October 9	@ Minnesota	W 78–76	Ogwumike, Toliver (19)	Ogwumike, Parker (9)	Chelsea Gray (4)	Target Center; 12,113	1–0
2	October 11	@ Minnesota	L 60–79	Nneka Ogwumike (14)	Nneka Ogwumike (12)	Beard, Carson, Parker (3)	Target Center; 12,832	1–1
3	October 14	Minnesota	W 92–75	Candace Parker (24)	Ogwumike, Parker (9)	Alana Beard (7)	Galen Center; 8,093	2–1
4	October 16	Minnesota	L 79–85	Chelsea Gray (20)	Nneka Ogwumike (8)	Alana Beard (4)	Staples Center; 12,885	2–2
5	October 20	@ Minnesota	W 77–76	Candace Parker (28)	Ogwumike, Parker (12)	Alana Beard (6)	Target Center; 19,423	3–2

2016 playoff schedule

== Standings ==
Western Conference	W	L	PCT	GB	Home	Road	Conf.
1 - Minnesota Lynx	28	6	.824	—	15–2	13–4	15–1
2 - Los Angeles Sparks	26	8	.765	2	14–3	12–5	11–5
7 - Seattle Storm	16	18	.471	12	10–7	6–11	7–9
8 - Phoenix Mercury	16	18	.471	12	11–6	5–12	6–10
e - Dallas Wings	11	23	.324	17	6–11	5–12	8–8
e - San Antonio Stars	7	27	.206	21	4–13	3–14	1–15

== Playoffs ==
The Sparks qualified for the 2016 playoffs, and, as the team with the second-best regular season record in the WNBA, received two automatic byes, advancing straight to the best-of-five semifinal.

**First round** Single elimination (Sept. 21)
5	Indiana Fever	78
8	**Phoenix Mercury**	**89**
6	**Atlanta Dream**	**94**
7	Seattle Storm	85

**Second round** Single elimination (Sept. 24 and 25)
3	New York Liberty	94
8	**Phoenix Mercury**	**101**
4	**Chicago Sky**	**108**
6	Atlanta Dream	98

**Semifinals**; Best-of-5 (Sept. 28 – Oct. 6)
1	**Minnesota Lynx**	**3**
8	Phoenix Mercury	0
2	**Los Angeles Sparks**	**3**
4	Chicago Sky	1

**WNBA Finals**; Best-of-5 (Oct. 9 – 20)
1	Minnesota Lynx	2
2	**Los Angeles Sparks**	**3**

Note: Teams re-seeded after the second round and semifinals.

- **Bold** – Game or series winner
- Italic – Team with home-court advantage

== Statistics ==
Legend
GP	Games played	GS	Games started	MPG	Minutes per game	RPG	Rebounds per game
APG	Assists per game	SPG	Steals per game	BPG	Blocks per game	PPG	Points per game
FG%	Field-goal percentage	3P%	3-point field-goal percentage	FT%	Free-throw percentage	TO	Turnovers per game
PF	Fouls per game		Team leader		League leader

=== Regular season ===
Player	GP	GS	MPG	FG%	3P%	FT%	RPG	APG	SPG	BPG	PPG
Nneka Ogwumike	33	33	31.6	66.5%	61.5%	86.9%	9.1	3.1	1.3	1.2	19.7
Candace Parker	34	34	30.8	44.2%	38.2%	70.7%	7.4	4.9	1.4	1.0	15.3
Kristi Toliver	33	33	32.1	42.6%	42.4%	88.9%	2.6	3.7	0.8	0.1	13.2
Jantel Lavender	34	0	19.4	53.8%	0.0%	68.3%	3.6	1.3	0.3	0.5	9.6
Essence Carson	34	34	23.3	44.9%	35.9%	89.1%	2.0	1.5	1.1	0.2	8.1
Alana Beard	34	34	29.3	46.7%	34.2%	69.2%	3.3	2.1	1.7	0.6	7.1
Chelsea Gray	33	1	16.4	45.2%	30.4%	78.0%	1.8	2.2	0.5	0.1	5.9
Ana Dabović	22	0	10.7	37.0%	15.8%	75.9%	0.8	1.3	0.6	0.0	3.0
Evgeniya Belyakova	21	0	11.3	29.6%	17.9%	43.8%	0.7	0.7	0.6	0.0	2.1
Jelena Dubljević	15	0	5.3	40.9%	33.3%	100%	0.9	0.5	0.1	0.1	1.5
Ann Wauters	21	1	4.6	54.5%	—	75.0%	1.1	0.4	0.2	0.1	1.4
Sandrine Gruda	7	0	5.3	33.3%	—	100%	0.6	0.3	0.1	0.1	1.0
Whitney Knight	7	0	3.9	20.0%	28.6%	—	0.4	0.1	0.3	0.3	0.9

=== Playoffs ===
Player	GP	GS	MPG	FG%	3P%	FT%	RPG	APG	SPG	BPG	PPG
Candace Parker	9	9	33.0	46.9%	31.3%	77.8%	8.7	3.2	1.7	1.9	19.3
Nneka Ogwumike	9	9	31.3	62.5%	22.2%	76.3%	9.3	2.6	2.0	1.1	17.9
Kristi Toliver	9	9	32.2	40.5%	41.4%	85.2%	2.0	3.0	1.4	0.1	12.8
Chelsea Gray	9	0	22.1	40.6%	39.1%	83.3%	1.7	2.8	1.1	0.0	9.0
Alana Beard	9	9	31.1	45.6%	50.0%	77.8%	3.8	3.7	1.1	0.4	8.0
Jantel Lavender	9	0	15.6	60.7%	0.0%	—	2.3	1.0	0.0	0.1	7.6
Essence Carson	9	9	25.2	33.3%	25.8%	50.0%	2.3	1.2	0.4	0.1	6.7
Jelena Dubljević	2	0	3.0	50.0%	—	—	0.0	0.0	0.0	0.0	1.0
Ann Wauters	2	0	2.5	50.0%	—	—	1.0	0.0	0.0	0.5	1.0
Ana Dabović	6	0	8.0	7.1%	14.3%	100%	0.3	2.0	0.2	0.0	0.8
Sandrine Gruda	6	0	2.8	—	—	—	0.8	0.0	0.2	0.0	0.2
Evgeniya Belyakova	3	0	2.7	0.0%	0.0%	—	0.3	0.0	0.0	0.3	0.0

== Awards and honors ==
Recipient	Award	Date awarded	Ref.
Candace Parker	Finals MVP	October 20, 2016	
Candace Parker	Western Conference Player of the Week	May 29, 2016	
Candace Parker	Western Conference Player of the Week	June 20, 2016	
Nneka Ogwumike	WNBA MVP	October 18, 2016	
Nneka Ogwumike	All-WNBA First Team	October 14, 2016	
Nneka Ogwumike	All-Defensive First Team	September 30, 2016	
Nneka Ogwumike	Western Conference Player of the Week	June 13, 2016	
Nneka Ogwumike	Western Conference Player of the Week	July 6, 2016	
Nneka Ogwumike	Western Conference Player of the Week	July 18, 2016	
Nneka Ogwumike	Western Conference Player of the Week	July 22, 2016	
Nneka Ogwumike	Western Conference Player of the Week	September 6, 2016	
Nneka Ogwumike	Western Conference Player of the Week	September 19, 2016	
Nneka Ogwumike	Western Conference Player of the Month - June	July 1, 2016	
Nneka Ogwumike	Western Conference Player of the Month - July	August 1, 2016	
Jantel Lavender	WNBA Sixth Player of the Year	September 28, 2016	
Alana Beard	All-Defensive First Team	September 30, 2016	
