= Brian Agler =

American women's professional basketball coach

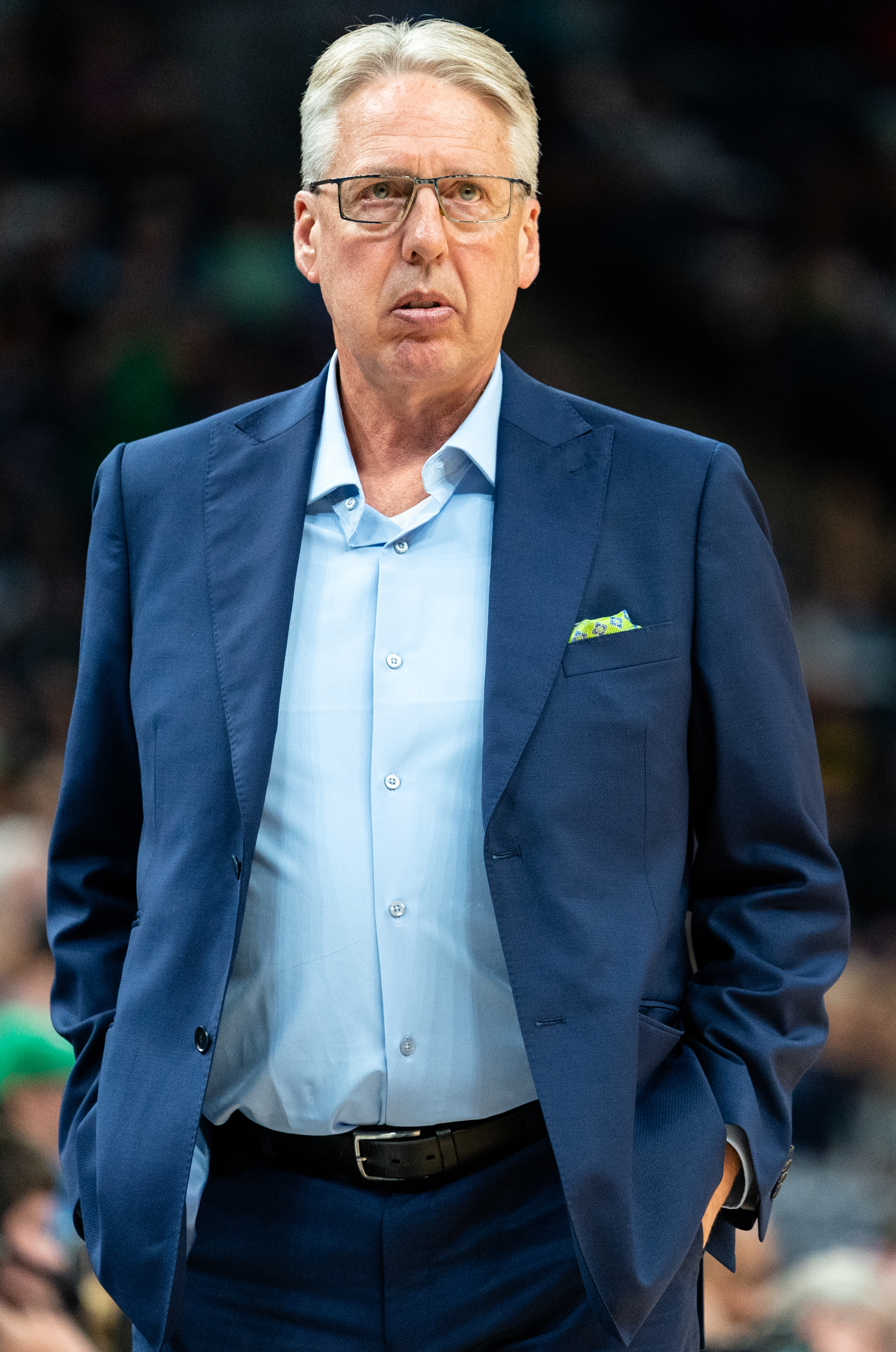
- Agler in 2019

Personal information
- Born: August 2, 1958 (age 68) Wilmington, Ohio, U.S.

Career information
- High school: Elgin (Marion, Ohio)
- College: Wittenberg (1976–1980)
- Position: Head coach
- Coaching career: 1988–2020

Career history

Coaching
- 1988–1993: UMKC
- 1993–1996: Kansas State
- 1996–1998: Columbus Quest
- 1999–2002: Minnesota Lynx
- 2004: Phoenix Mercury (assistant)
- 2005–2007: San Antonio Silver Stars (assistant)
- 2008–2014: Seattle Storm
- 2015–2018: Los Angeles Sparks
- 2019–2020: Dallas Wings

Career highlights
- As player: NCAA Division III champion (1977); OAC Player of the Year (1980); As coach: ABL Coach of the Year Award (1997); 2× ABL champion (1997, 1998); WNBA Coach of the Year Award (2010); 2× WNBA champion (2010, 2016)
- Stats at WNBA.com

Brian Agler (born August 2, 1958) is an American college athletics administrator and former women's basketball coach. He is the athletic director at Wittenberg University in Springfield, Ohio, a position he has held since 2021. Agler served as head coach of the Dallas Wings of the Women's National Basketball Association (WNBA) from 2019 to 2020. He had previously been head coach of the Seattle Storm and the Los Angeles Sparks, each of whom he led to a WNBA championship, in 2010 and 2016, respectively. During his coaching career, Agler has guided young stars like Candace Parker, Nneka Ogwumike, Alana Beard, Skylar Diggins, Tayler Hill, Liz Cambage, Megan Gustafson, and Arike Ogunbowale.

== Early years ==
Agler attended college at Wittenberg University in Ohio, where he won the 1977 Division III NCAA Championship as a point guard. He graduated in 1980. He received his master's degree in education from Pittsburg State University in 1985.

== Coaching career ==
=== College ===
==== Kansas State ====
Agler became the head coach of the Kansas State women's basketball team in 1993. He was suspended in the middle of his third season (1995–1996), pending an NCAA rules violation investigation. Kansas State under Agler was 13–14 his first season (1993–1994), 14–13 his second season, and 11–12 for the 23 games he coached in his final season.

=== American Basketball League (ABL) ===
==== Columbus Quest ====
As head coach of the Columbus Quest of the American Basketball League, Agler led the team to a combined 82–22 record and two ABL Championships. He was named ABL Coach of the Year in 1997.

=== Women's National Basketball Association (WNBA) ===
==== Minnesota Lynx ====
After the ABL collapsed in late 1998, Agler made the shift to the WNBA. He became the first head coach of the Minnesota Lynx, piloting them to a 48–67 record from 1999–2002.

==== Assistant coaching stints ====
He served as an assistant coach with the Phoenix Mercury in the 2004 season, then with the San Antonio Silver Stars from 2005 to 2007.

==== Seattle Storm ====
The Seattle Storm named Agler head coach on January 9, 2008. He succeeded Anne Donovan. who resigned in November 2007. Agler was the general manager and head coach for the Seattle Storm until 2014, leading them to their second championship in 2010.

==== Los Angeles Sparks ====
On January 5, 2015, it was announced that Agler would become the head coach of the Los Angeles Sparks.

Agler guided the 2015 version of the Sparks to a 14–20 record and a 4th-place finish in the WNBA's Western Conference.

On October 20, 2016, Agler guided the Sparks to their third WNBA championship, defeating the Lynx, 77–76, in the decisive Game 5 of the 2016 WNBA Finals, thereby winning the league championship series, 3–2. He became the first head coach to win WNBA titles with two teams.

On November 1, 2018, Agler resigned from his position as the Sparks coach.

==== Dallas Wings ====
On December 17, 2018, Agler was hired as the head coach of the Dallas Wings.

On October 14, 2020, the Dallas Wings announced that the organization had parted ways with Agler.

== Professional career ==
In January 2021, Agler joined Wittenberg University as the Vice President and Director of Athletics and Recreation.

== Personal life ==
Agler's son, Bryce, was an assistant coach with the Los Angeles Sparks during Agler's tenure as head coach of the franchise.

== Head coaching record ==
Legend
Regular season	G	Games coached	W	Games won	L	Games lost	W–L %	Win–loss %
Playoffs	PG	Playoff games	PW	Playoff wins	PL	Playoff losses	PW–L %	Playoff win–loss %

Team	Year	G	W	L	W–L%	Finish	PG	PW	PL	PW–L%	Result
MIN	1999	32	15	17	.469	4th in West	-	-	-	-	Missed Playoffs
MIN	2000	32	15	17	.469	6th in West	-	-	-	-	Missed Playoffs
MIN	2001	32	12	20	.375	6th in West	-	-	-	-	Missed Playoffs
MIN	2002	19	6	13	.316	8th in West	-	-	-	-	Fired Mid-Season
SEA	2008	34	22	12	.647	2nd in West	3	1	2	.333	Lost in Western Conference Semi-Finals
SEA	2009	34	20	14	.588	2nd in West	3	1	2	.333	Lost in Western Conference Semi-Finals
SEA	2010	34	28	6	.824	1st in West	7	7	0	1.000	Won WNBA Finals
SEA	2011	34	21	13	.618	2nd in West	3	1	2	.333	Lost in Western Conference Semi-Finals
SEA	2012	34	16	18	.471	4th in West	3	1	2	.333	Lost in Western Conference Semi-Finals
SEA	2013	34	17	17	.500	4th in West	2	0	2	.000	Lost in Western Conference Semi-Finals
SEA	2014	34	12	22	.353	5th in West	-	-	-	-	Missed Playoffs
LA	2015	34	14	20	.412	4th in West	3	1	2	.333	Lost in Western Conference Semi-Finals
LA	2016	34	26	8	.765	2nd in West	9	6	3	.667	Won WNBA Finals
LA	2017	34	26	8	.765	2nd in West	8	5	3	.625	Lost in WNBA Finals
LA	2018	34	19	15	.559	3rd in West	2	1	1	.500	Lost in Western Conference Semi-Finals
DAL	2019	34	10	24	.294	5th in West	-	-	-	-	Missed Playoffs
DAL	2020	22	8	14	.364	6th in West	-	-	-	-	Missed Playoffs
Career		545	287	258	.527		43	24	19	.558	
