= Whitney Knight =

American basketball player (born 1993)

Personal information
- Born: January 9, 1993 (age 33)
- Listed height: 191 cm (6 ft 3 in)
- Listed weight: 71 kg (157 lb)

Career information
- College: Florida Gulf Coast (2012–2016)
- WNBA draft: 2016: 2nd round, 15th overall pick
- Drafted by: Los Angeles Sparks
- Playing career: 2016–present
- Position: Guard

Career history
- 2016: Los Angeles Sparks
- 2016: San Antonio Stars
- 2016–2017: Spartak Moscow Region
- 2017: Campus Promete
- 2018: Breiðablik
- 2021–2022: SKK Polonia Warszawa

Career highlights
- 2x ASUN Conference Player of the Year (2015, 2016); 3x First-team All-ASUN (2014–2016); ASUN All-Freshman Team (2012)
- Stats at Basketball Reference

Whitney Kiera Knight (born January 9, 1993) is an American basketball player. She played college basketball for Florida Gulf Coast and later professionally, including for the Los Angeles Sparks and the San Antonio Stars.

== Career statistics ==
=== WNBA ===
Legend
GP	Games played	GS	Games started	MPG	Minutes per game	RPG	Rebounds per game
APG	Assists per game	SPG	Steals per game	BPG	Blocks per game	PPG	Points per game
TO	Turnovers per game	FG%	Field-goal percentage	3P%	3-point field-goal percentage	FT%	Free-throw percentage
**Bold**	Career best	°	League leader

==== Regular season ====
Year	Team	GP	GS	MPG	FG%	3P%	FT%	RPG	APG	SPG	BPG	TO	PPG
2016	Los Angeles	**7**	0	**3.9**	**20.0**	**28.6**	0.0	0.4	0.1	**0.3**	**0.3**	0.3	**0.9**
2016	San Antonio	3	0	3.7	0.0	0.0	0.0	**0.7**	**0.3**	0.0	0.0	**0.0**	0.0
Career	1 year, 2 teams	10	0	3.8	13.3	18.2	0.0	0.5	0.2	0.2	0.2	0.2	0.6

=== College ===
Legend
GP	Games played	GS	Games started	MPG	Minutes per game
FG%	Field goal percentage	3P%	3-point field goal percentage	FT%	Free throw percentage
RPG	Rebounds per game	APG	Assists per game	SPG	Steals per game
BPG	Blocks per game	PPG	Points per game	**Bold**	Career high

Year	Team	GP	Points	FG%	3P%	FT%	RPG	APG	SPG	BPG	PPG
2011–12	Florida Gulf Coast	32	256	39.2%	33.3%	74.6%	3.8	2.0	0.9	1.7	8.0
2012–13	Florida Gulf Coast	Redshirt									
2013–14	Florida Gulf Coast	**34**	417	38.7%	37.9%	74.4%	5.3	1.7	1.4	2.7	12.3
2014–15	Florida Gulf Coast	**34**	**504**	**43.7%**	**41.2%**	**79.8%**	6.4	1.7	1.9	2.6	**14.8**°
2015–16	Florida Gulf Coast	30	397	34.4%	34.4%	79.4%	**7.2**	**2.2**	**2.1**	**3.3**	13.2
Career		127	1574	42.3%	33.3%	62.0%	9.6	0.5	0.8	0.8	12.4

== Career ==
Knight was drafted by the Los Angeles Sparks in the second round of the 2016 WNBA draft. She was cut by the Sparks in August, 2016, after appearing in seven games. On September 2, 2016, Knight was signed by the San Antonio Stars for the remainder of the season.

In September 2016, Knight signed with Spartak Moscow Region.

In February 2017, Knight was signed by the Atlanta Dream to a training camp contract. She was waived by Atlanta on May 6, prior to the season start. In July, 2017, Knight signed with Campus Promete of the Spanish Liga Femenina de Baloncesto. Due to an ankle injury and the team's general poor play, Knight was released in November in a major upheaval by the club that also included the release of Cristina Pedrals. In seven games, Knight averaged 7.4 points and 2.8 rebounds. On January 27, 2018, Knight signed with Breiðablik of the Icelandic Úrvalsdeild kvenna. In 11 games for Breiðablik, she averaged 23.9 points and 10.6 rebounds per game.

On January 11, 2024, Knight re-signed with Athletes Unlimited for the 2024 basketball season after competing in seven games during the 2023 season.

== Awards, titles and accomplishments ==
=== Individual awards ===
- Atlantic Sun Conference Player of Year (2): 2015, 2016
- Atlantic Sun Conference All-First Team (3): 2014, 2015, 2016
