= Brene Moseley =

American basketball player (born 1993)

Personal information
- Born: November 25, 1993 (age 32) Burtonsville, Maryland, U.S.
- Listed height: 5 ft 7 in (1.70 m)
- Listed weight: 120 lb (54 kg)

Career information
- High school: Paint Branch (Burtonsville)
- College: Maryland (2011–2016)
- WNBA draft: 2016: 2nd round, 21st overall pick
- Drafted by: Indiana Fever
- Position: Guard
- Number: 30

Career history
- 2016: Indiana Fever

Career highlights
- ACC All-Freshman team (2012); Second-team All-Big Ten (2016); Big Ten Sixth Player of the Year (2016)
- Stats at WNBA.com
- Stats at Basketball Reference

Brene Moseley (born November 25, 1993) is an American former professional basketball player. She played guard for the Indiana Fever of the Women's National Basketball Association (WNBA). She was drafted by the Fever in the second round of the 2016 WNBA draft. Moseley played college basketball for the Maryland Terrapins.

== Early life ==
As a child, Moseley earned the nickname "Bones" because of her thin physique. Moseley attended and played basketball at Paint Branch High School in Burtonsville, Maryland. She was named first-team All-Met as a junior by The Washington Post. Late in her junior year of high school, Moseley suffered a torn ACL in her right knee, preventing her from playing basketball during her senior year. ESPN ranked her as a four-star basketball prospect coming out of high school.

== College career ==
Committing to play for the Maryland Terrapins, who recruited her in spite of her ACL injury, Moseley was an immediate contributor to the team. In the third game of her freshman season (2011–2012), Moseley led Maryland in scoring, with 26 points in a win against Towson. She was named to the ACC All-Freshman and All-Academic teams.

Moseley missed the 2012–2013 season after suffering another torn ACL, this time in her left knee, in a preseason scrimmage.

Moseley returned to the team for her redshirt sophomore season, making 8 of 8 free throws in her first game back from the injury in a win against South Florida and adding 11 points in a victory over Army in the 2014 NCAA Division I women's basketball tournament. In her junior year, she made two late-game free throws and a steal to help Maryland defeat sixth-ranked Tennessee in the 2015 NCAA Division I women's basketball tournament, propelling the Terrapins to their second consecutive Final Four.

In her senior year, Moseley tied her career-high 26 points set as a freshman as she led her team in scoring in a win against Old Dominion. In an interview before Maryland's 2016 senior day, head coach Brenda Frese stated that though she was a bench player for Maryland, Moseley "would be a starter on most teams". She surpassed 1,000 career points in a win against Northwestern in the semifinals of the Big Ten tournament and recorded 16 points, seven assists, and three rebounds in a loss to Washington in the 2016 NCAA Division I women's basketball tournament, which ended her college career. Moseley was named the Big Ten's Sixth Player of the Year and second-team All-Big Ten for the 2015–2016 season.

Moseley played in 142 games in her college career.

== Professional career ==
The Indiana Fever selected Moseley in the second round with the 21st overall pick in the 2016 WNBA draft. She averaged 1.9 points and 1.1 assists per game in eight games in 2016 before she was waived by the team on June 20.

== Career statistics ==
Legend
GP	Games played	GS	Games started	MPG	Minutes per game	RPG	Rebounds per game
APG	Assists per game	SPG	Steals per game	BPG	Blocks per game	PPG	Points per game
TO	Turnovers per game	FG%	Field-goal percentage	3P%	3-point field-goal percentage	FT%	Free-throw percentage
**Bold**	Career best	°	League leader

=== WNBA ===
WNBA regular season statistics
Year	Team	GP	GS	MPG	FG%	3P%	FT%	RPG	APG	SPG	BPG	TO	PPG
2016	Indiana	8	0	9.6	.261	.200	.400	0.4	1.1	0.5	0.0	2.0	1.9

=== College ===
NCAA statistics
Year	Team	GP	GS	MPG	FG%	3P%	FT%	RPG	APG	SPG	BPG	TO	PPG
2011–12	Maryland	**36**	0	17.4	.441	**.405**	**.860**	1.8	2.7	0.6	0.0	2.2	6.9
2012–13	Maryland	0	0	Did not play due to injury									
2013–14	Maryland	35	**1**	13.6	.441	.310	.797	1.4	2.5	0.8	**0.1**	1.5	5.5
2014–15	Maryland	**36**	0	11.3	.416	.368	.780	1.1	1.4	0.6	0.0	1.3	5.6
2015–16	Maryland	35	**1**	**22.5**	**.477**	.329	.763	**2.1**	**5.9**	**1.1**	**0.1**	**2.5**	**11.6**
**Career**		142	2	16.2	.450	.358	.789	1.6	3.1	0.8	0.0	1.9	7.4
