= 2016 Indiana Fever season =

17th season in the WNBA

- Head coach: Stephanie White
- Arena: Bankers Life Fieldhouse

Results
- Record: 17–17 (.500)
- Place: 3rd (Eastern)
- Playoff finish: First round (lost to Phoenix Mercury 1–0)

Media
- Television: FSMW, ESPN2, NBATV

The 2016 Indiana Fever season was the 17th season for the Indiana Fever of the Women's National Basketball Association. The season tipped off on May 1.

The Fever began the season slowly, losing their opening game. They won the next two games before losing their final two games in May to finish the month with a 2–3 record. In June, the team continued to struggle to find some consistency. They won their first game, but lost the next. After defeating Connecticut, they went on a three-game losing streak. The streak ended with a win at San Antonio, but that was followed by an overtime loss to New York. The Fever won their last two games of the month and finished 5–6 in June. The team lost their first two games in July before winning the next two. A loss to Connecticut prevented a winning streak from developing. However, they won their final three games of the month going into the Olympic break. The streak included a ten-point win over Los Angeles. The Fever got off to a slow start after the break, losing their only two games in August, and not managing to score more than 70 points in either. They won their opening game of September, before losing in Los Angeles. They then went on a three-game winning streak, which was followed by two losses. They won their final game of the season against Dallas to finish September 5–3.

The Fever finished with a record of 17–17, which placed them third in the Eastern Conference and fifth overall. As the fifth-seed in the 2016 WNBA Playoffs, they hosted the eighth-seed Phoenix Mercury in the First Round. The Fever lost 78–89 to end their season.

== Transactions ==
=== WNBA draft ===
The Fever made three selections in the 2016 WNBA Entry Draft in Uncasville, Connecticut:

Round	Pick	Player	Nationality	WNBA Team	School/Team/Country
1	9	Tiffany Mitchell	United States	Indiana Fever	South Carolina
2	21	Brene Moseley	United States	Indiana Fever	Maryland
3	29	Julie Allemand	Belgium	Indiana Fever	Castors Braine

=== Trades and Roster Changes ===
Date	Transaction
February 1	Re-Signed Shenise Johnson and Lynetta Kizer
February 2	The Fever acquired Natasha Howard from the Minnesota Lynx in exchange for Devereaux Peters
May 10	The Fever acquired the 22nd overall pick in the 2017 WNBA draft from the Atlanta Dream in exchange for Layshia Clarendon
May 24	Head Coach Stephanie White announced that she would finish the season and then leave the team

=== Subtractions / Unsigned ===
Player	Date	Reason	New Team	Ref.

== Roster ==
2016 Indiana Fever roster
Players
Coaches

Pos.	No.	Nat.	Name	Height	Weight	DOB	From	Yrs
F	11	(United States)	Achonwa, Natalie	6' 4" (1.93m)	183 lb (83kg)	1992-11-22	Notre Dame	1
F	24	(United States)	Catchings, Tamika	6' 1" (1.85m)	167 lb (76kg)	1979-07-21	Tennessee	14
G	25	(United States)	Coleman, Marissa	6' 1" (1.85m)	160 lb (73kg)	1987-01-04	Maryland	7
F	99	(United States)	Dupree, Candice	6' 2" (1.88m)	178 lb (81kg)	1984-08-16	Temple	10
F	97	(United States)	Graves, Bashaara	6' 2" (1.88m)	200 lb (91kg)	1994-03-17	Tennessee	R
G	20	(United States)	January, Briann	5' 8" (1.73m)	144 lb (65kg)	1987-01-11	Arizona State	7
G	42	(United States)	Johnson, Shenise	5' 11" (1.8m)	172 lb (78kg)	1990-12-08	Miami (FL)	4
F	2	(United States)	Larkins, Erlana	6' 1" (1.85m)	205 lb (93kg)	1986-04-02	North Carolina	6
G	33	(United States)	Lucas, Maggie	5' 10" (1.78m)	152 lb (69kg)	1991-11-29	Penn State	2
G	3	(United States)	Mitchell, Tiffany	5' 9" (1.75m)	153 lb (69kg)	1994-09-23	South Carolina	1
F	14	(United States)	Peters, Devereaux	6' 2" (1.88m)	174 lb (79kg)	1989-10-08	Notre Dame	5
G	32	(United States)	Pohlen-Mavunga, Jeanette	0' 4" (0.1m)	171 lb (78kg)	1989-05-02	Stanford	4
G	17	(United States)	Wheeler, Erica	5' 7" (1.7m)	143 lb (65kg)	1991-05-02	Rutgers	1

Head coach
(United States) Stephanie White (Purdue)
Assistant coaches
(United States) Steven Key (Boston University)

Legend

- (C) Team captain
- (DP) Unsigned draft pick
- (FA) Free agent
- (S) Suspended
- Injured

== Game log ==
=== Preseason ===
2016 pre-season game log
May: 2–0 (Home: 1–0; Road: 1–0)

Game	Date	Team	Score	High points	High rebounds	High assists	Location Attendance	Record
1	May 1, 2016; 1:00 pm	Dallas	W 108–90	Maggie Lucas (22)	Natalie Achonwa (8)	6 players (2)	Bankers Life Fieldhouse; 6,214	1–0
2	May 6, 2016; 11:30 am	@ Washington	W 89–69	Tamika Catchings (16)	Mitchell, Taylor (6)	Devereaux Peters (5)	Verizon Center; 2,072	2–0

2016 pre-season schedule

=== Regular season ===
2016 game log
Total: 17–17 (Home: 8–9 Road: 9–8)
May: 2–3 (Home: 2–1; Road: 0–2)

Game	Date	Team	Score	High points	High rebounds	High assists	Location Attendance	Record
1	May 14, 2016; 6:00 pm	Dallas	L 79–90	Tiffany Mitchell (18)	Erlana Larkins (13)	Erlana Larkins (4)	Bankers Life Fieldhouse; 8,569	0–1
2	May 18, 2016; 7:00 pm	Phoenix	W 97–93	Johnson, Wheeler (16)	Erlana Larkins (10)	Shenise Johnson (7)	Bankers Life Fieldhouse; 6,749	1–1
3	May 20, 2016; 7:00 pm	Atlanta	W 94–85	Tamika Catchings (14)	Shenise Johnson (7)	Brene Moseley (6)	Bankers Life Fieldhouse; 7,608	2–1
4	May 27, 2016; 8:00 pm	@ Minnesota	L 71–74	Tiffany Mitchell (16)	Coleman, Larkins (6)	Tiffany Mitchell (4)	Target Center; 7,503	2–2
5	May 29, 2016; 3:00 pm	@ Atlanta	L 74–76	Erica Wheeler (18)	Achonwa, Larkins (8)	Erica Wheeler (7)	Philips Arena; 5,233	2–3

June: 5–6 (Home: 1–3; Road: 4–3)

Game	Date	Team	Score	High points	High rebounds	High assists	Location Attendance	Record
6	June 1, 2016; 7:00 pm	Seattle	W 85–75	Lynetta Kizer (20)	Marissa Coleman (7)	Catchings, January, Moseley (3)	Bankers Life Fieldhouse; 6,721	3–3
7	June 3, 2016; 7:30 pm	@ New York	L 59–91	Tiffany Mitchell (11)	Erlana Larkins (7)	Briann January (3)	Madison Square Garden; 8,566	3–4
8	June 5, 2016; 3:00 pm	@ Connecticut	W 88–77	Tiffany Mitchell (21)	Erlana Larkins (10)	Briann January (5)	Mohegan Sun Arena; 5,346	4–4
9	June 10, 2016; 7:00 pm	Chicago	L 64–73	Briann January (17)	Erlana Larkins (9)	Marissa Coleman (5)	Bankers Life Fieldhouse; 7,533	4–5
10	June 12, 2016; 6:00 pm	Seattle	L 88–90	Tamika Catchings (27)	Tamika Catchings (6)	Marissa Coleman (3)	Bankers Life Fieldhouse; 6,724	4–6
11	June 14, 2016; 8:00 pm	@ Minnesota	L 63–87	Erlana Larkins (12)	Erlana Larkins (9)	Briann January (4)	Target Center; 7,623	4–7
12	June 17, 2016; 8:00 pm	@ San Antonio	W 84–75	Tamika Catchings (23)	Erlana Larkins (8)	Briann January (8)	AT&T Center; 6,107	5–7
13	June 19, 2016; 2:00 pm	New York	L 75–78 (OT)	Tamika Catchings (23)	Erlana Larkins (15)	Briann January (5)	Bankers Life Fieldhouse; 7,440	5–8
14	June 22; 7:00 pm	@ Washington	L 62–76	Lynetta Kizer (18)	Kizer, Peters (7)	Catchings, January (4)	Verizon Center; 4,430	5–9
15	June 25; 8:30 pm	@ Dallas	W 92–87	Erlana Larkins (19)	Erlana Larkins (7)	Briann January (7)	College Park Center; 5,206	6–9
16	June 29; 12:30 pm	@ Chicago	W 95–83	Tamika Catchings (26)	Erlana Larkins (9)	Erica Wheeler (9)	Allstate Arena; 11,892	7–9

July: 5–3 (Home: 2–2; Road: 3–1)

Game	Date	Team	Score	High points	High rebounds	High assists	Location Attendance	Record
17	July 1, 2016; 7:00 pm	San Antonio	L 85–87 (OT)	Erlana Larkins (16)	Erlana Larkins (17)	Briann January (7)	Bankers Life Fieldhouse; 7,519	7–10
18	July 6, 2016; 10:30 pm	@ Los Angeles	L 88–94	Tiffany Mitchell (20)	Kizer, Wheeler (4)	Erica Wheeler (7)	Staples Center; 8,224	7–11
19	July 8, 2016; 10:00 pm	@ Phoenix	W 78–60	January, Larkins (13)	Erlana Larkins (10)	January, Mitchell, Johnson (3)	US Airways Center; 10,371	8–11
20	July 10, 2016; 7:00 pm	@ Seattle	W 93–82	Shenise Johnson (18)	Erlana Larkins (7)	Briann January (7)	KeyArena; 5,975	9–11
21	July 13, 2016; 12:00 pm	Connecticut	W 64–86	Lynetta Kizer (18)	Tamika Catchings (6)	Briann January (5)	Bankers Life Fieldhouse; 12,272	9–12
22	July 15, 2016; 7:00 pm	Atlanta	W 78–72	Catchings, Kizer (18)	Erlana Larkins (11)	Briann January (6)	Bankers Life Fieldhouse; 8,612	10–12
23	July 19, 2016; 8:00 pm	Los Angeles	W 92–82	Tamika Catchings (23)	Coleman, Kizer (5)	Briann January (9)	Bankers Life Fieldhouse; 7,269	11–12
24	July 21, 2016; 11:00 am	@ New York	W 82–70	Lynetta Kizer (21)	Tamika Catchings (8)	Shenise Johnson (7)	Madison Square Garden; 11,253	12–12

August: 0–2 (Home: 0–2; Road: 0–0)

Game	Date	Team	Score	High points	High rebounds	High assists	Location Attendance	Record
25	August 27, 2016; 7:00 pm	Washington	L 69–92	Achonwa, Catchings, Larkins (12)	Shenise Johnson (9)	Briann January (7)	Bankers Life Fieldhouse; 8,081	12–13
26	August 30, 2016; 7:00 pm	Phoenix	L 65–79	Erlana Larkins (12)	Erlana Larkins (8)	Briann January (4)	Bankers Life Fieldhouse; 7,250	12–14

September: 5–3 (Home: 3–1; Road: 2–2)

Game	Date	Team	Score	High points	High rebounds	High assists	Location Attendance	Record
27	September 1, 2016; 7:00 pm	New York	W 98–77	Shenise Johnson (21)	Tamika Catchings (9)	Catchings, Larkins, Wheeler (4)	Bankers Life Fieldhouse; 6,524	13–14
28	September 4, 2016; 7:00 pm	@ Los Angeles	L 81–88	Erica Wheeler – 20	Erlana Larkins – 7	Briann January (5)	Staples Center; 11,332	13–15
29	September 6, 2016; 8:00 pm	@ San Antonio	W 71–69	Lynetta Kizer (15)	Catchings, Coleman (8)	Coleman, January, Mitchell 2	AT&T Center; 5,838	14–15
30	September 9, 2016; 7:00 pm	Chicago	W 95–88	Briann January (20)	Tamika Catchings (8)	Briann January (6)	Bankers Life Fieldhouse; 10,533	15–15
31	September 11, 2016; 4:00 pm	@ Washington	W 80–73	Kizer, Wheeler (17)	Marissa Coleman (7)	Briann January (4)	Verizon Center; 6,542	16–15
32	September 13, 2016; 7:00 pm	@ Connecticut	L 87–89	Shenise Johnson (23)	Coleman, Kizer (8)	Tamika Catchings (4)	Mohegan Sun Arena; 4,407	16–16
33	September 16, 2016; 7:00 pm	Minnesota	L 75–82	Marissa Coleman (19)	Erlana Larkins (6)	Erlana Larkins (4)	Bankers Life Fieldhouse; 8,663	16–17
34	September 18, 2016; 4:00 pm	Dallas	W 83–60	Catchings, Kizer (16)	Erlana Larkins (9)	Briann January (8)	Bankers Life Fieldhouse; 17,704	17–17

2016 season schedule

=== Playoffs ===
2016 playoff game log
Total 0–1
First Round vs. Phoenix Mercury

Game	Date	Team	Score	High points	High rebounds	High assists	Location Attendance	Record
1	September 21	Phoenix	L 89–78	Catchings, Coleman (13)	Tamika Catchings (10)	Briann January (9)	Bankers Life Fieldhouse; 6,282	0–1

2016 playoff schedule

== Standings ==
Western Conference	W	L	PCT	GB	Home	Road	Conf.
1 - Minnesota Lynx	28	6	.824	—	15–2	13–4	15–1
2 - Los Angeles Sparks	26	8	.765	2	14–3	12–5	11–5
7 - Seattle Storm	16	18	.471	12	10–7	6–11	7–9
8 - Phoenix Mercury	16	18	.471	12	11–6	5–12	6–10
e - Dallas Wings	11	23	.324	17	6–11	5–12	8–8
e - San Antonio Stars	7	27	.206	21	4–13	3–14	1–15

Notes

# – Playoff seed
e – Eliminated from playoffs

Eastern Conference	W	L	PCT	GB	Home	Road	Conf.
3 - New York Liberty	21	13	.618	—	10–7	11–6	11–5
4 - Chicago Sky	18	16	.529	3	11–6	7–10	8–8
5 - Indiana Fever	17	17	.500	4	8–9	9–8	8–8
6 - Atlanta Dream	17	17	.500	4	11–6	6–11	9–7
e - Connecticut Sun	14	20	.412	7	8–9	6–11	4–12
e - Washington Mystics	13	21	.382	8	5–12	8–9	8–8

Notes

# – Playoff seed
e – Eliminated from playoffs

== Playoffs ==
The Fever qualified for the 2016 playoffs with the 5th best season record in the WNBA. The Fever would lose to the Phoenix Mercury in the first round, single-elimination game.

**First round** Single elimination (Sept. 21)
5	Indiana Fever	78
8	**Phoenix Mercury**	**89**
6	**Atlanta Dream**	**94**
7	Seattle Storm	85

**Second round** Single elimination (Sept. 24 and 25)
3	New York Liberty	94
8	**Phoenix Mercury**	**101**
4	**Chicago Sky**	**108**
6	Atlanta Dream	98

**Semifinals**; Best-of-5 (Sept. 28 – Oct. 6)
1	**Minnesota Lynx**	**3**
8	Phoenix Mercury	0
2	**Los Angeles Sparks**	**3**
4	Chicago Sky	1

**WNBA Finals**; Best-of-5 (Oct. 9 – 20)
1	Minnesota Lynx	2
2	**Los Angeles Sparks**	**3**

Note: Teams re-seeded after the second round and semifinals.

- **Bold** – Game or series winner
- Italic – Team with home-court advantage

== Statistics ==
Legend
GP	Games played	GS	Games started	MPG	Minutes per game	RPG	Rebounds per game
APG	Assists per game	SPG	Steals per game	BPG	Blocks per game	PPG	Points per game
FG%	Field-goal percentage	3P%	3-point field-goal percentage	FT%	Free-throw percentage	TO	Turnovers per game
PF	Fouls per game		Team leader		League leader

=== Regular season ===
Player	GP	GS	MPG	FG%	3P%	FT%	RPG	APG	SPG	BPG	PPG
Tamika Catchings	34	34	24.8	43.3%	35.0%	86.2%	4.8	1.9	1.8	0.3	12.7
Shenise Johnson	29	10	22.4	41.0%	35.9%	93.8%	3.5	2.1	1.2	0.3	9.8
Briann January	29	27	28.1	40.1%	39.2%	87.5%	1.8	4.7	1.2	0.1	9.7
Lynetta Kizer	33	12	17.2	55.6%	0.0%	80.0%	3.2	0.6	0.8	0.3	9.6
Tiffany Mitchell	34	8	20.0	36.1%	29.4%	9.11%	1.7	1.4	0.9	0.1	8.6
Erica Wheeler	34	25	23.9	41.8%	29.8%	83.3%	2.1	2.8	0.7	0.0	8.4
Erlana Larkins	33	33	26.7	63.9%	—	88.4%	7.4	2.1	0.9	0.5	8.3
Marissa Coleman	32	21	24.4	34.6%	26.8%	75.3%	3.3	2.0	0.9	0.3	8.3
Maggie Lucas	4	0	13.8	52.4%	20.0%	100%	2.0	0.8	0.5	0.0	7.8
Devereaux Peters	30	0	14.7	54.9%	33.3%	55.6%	3.0	0.7	0.4	0.6	5.2
Natalie Achonwa	24	0	8.1	54.5%	—	70.0%	2.0	0.3	0.4	0.0	3.6
Brene Moseley	8	0	9.6	26.1%	20.0%	40.0%	0.4	1.1	0.5	0.0	1.9
Jeanette Pohlen-Mavunga	12	0	4.1	54.5%	50.0%	100%	0.1	0.4	0.0	0.0	1.3

== Awards and honors ==
Recipient	Award	Date awarded	Ref.
Tamika Catchings	Kim Perrot Sportsmanship Award	September 21	
Tiffany Mitchell	WNBA All-Rookie Team	September 29	
Briann January	WNBA All-Defensive First Team	September 30	
Tamika Catchings	WNBA All-Defensive Second Team	September 30	
