= 2016 New York Liberty season =

- Head coach: Bill Laimbeer
- Arena: Madison Square Garden

Results
- Record: 21–13 (.618)
- Place: 1st (Eastern)
- Playoff finish: Lost in Second Round to Phoenix

Media
- Television: MSG Network (MSG), MSG Plus (MSG+)

The 2016 WNBA season was the 20th season for the New York Liberty franchise of the WNBA. The season began on May 14, on the road against the Washington Mystics. The Liberty started the season with two straight wins, before dropping their final three games in May. Two of there losses came in overtime, and the third came by ten points to Minnesota. They won their first two games of June before dropping a road game against Los Angeles. The Liberty went on a winning streak from there, winning their next six straight games, which included four road wins. The streak was broken with an overtime loss to Phoenix on June 26. The team followed that with an overtime victory over Minnesota to finish the month 9–2. The Liberty won five of their first six games in July, with the only lost coming in Los Angeles. Their victories included three point defeats of Seattle and Chicago. They went 2–2 in their final four games before the Olympic break, losing to Minnesota and Indiana, and defeating Connecticut and Washington. They finished July 7–3, and were 18–8 before the break. They won their first game back against San Antonio 84–77. However, the second half of the season did not go as well for the Liberty, as they went 2–5 in September. They only defeated Phoenix and Connecticut. All of their defeats, except a 84–81 loss to Dallas, came by double digits.

The Liberty finished the season 21–13, which saw them finish in first place in the Eastern Conference. They were the third seed in the 2016 WNBA playoffs and earned a bye into the Second Round. They hosted eighth-seed Phoenix in their Second Round game. The Mercury defeated the Liberty 101–94. The game was within two points in the fourth quarter, but a late surge saw the Mercury pull away. A highlight of the season was Tina Charles sweeping Eastern Conference Player of the Month awards, and winning seven Eastern Conference Player of the Week awards. She was also selected to the All-WNBA First Team while leading the league in scoring and rebounding.

== Transactions ==
=== WNBA draft ===
Round	Pick	Player	Nationality	School/Team/Country
1	12	Adut Bulgak	Canada	Florida State
2	24	Ameryst Alston	United States	Ohio State
3	36	Shacobia Barbee	United States	Georgia

=== Trades/Roster Changes ===
Date	Details
February 1, 2016	Signed Shavonte Zellous
February 1, 2016	Re-signed Carolyn Swords
March 8, 2016	Signed Swin Cash
April 18, 2016	Signed Lindsey Harding
May 2, 2016	The Liberty acquired Shoni Schimmel from the Atlanta Dream in exchange for their second round pick in the 2017 WNBA draft.
May 11, 2016	The Liberty acquired Amanda Zahui B. and Dallas' second round pick in the 2017 draft in exchange for the Liberty's first round pick in the 2017 draft.

== Roster ==
2016 New York Liberty roster
Players
Coaches

Pos.	No.	Nat.	Name	Height	Weight	DOB	From	Yrs
G/F	9	(Australia)	Allen, Rebecca	6' 2" (1.88m)	162 lb (73kg)	1992-11-06	Australia	1
G	22	(United States)	Alston, Ameryst	5' 9" (1.75m)	178 lb (81kg)	1994-06-20	Ohio State	R
G	15	(United States)	Boyd, Brittany	5' 9" (1.75m)	156 lb (71kg)	1993-06-11	California	1
C	2	(United States)	Bulgak, Adut	6' 4" (1.93m)	156 lb (71kg)	1992-12-20	Florida State	R
F	32	(United States)	Cash, Swin	6' 1" (1.85m)	171 lb (78kg)	1979-09-22	Connecticut	14
F/C	31	(United States)	Charles, Tina	6' 4" (1.93m)	192 lb (87kg)	1988-12-05	Connecticut	6
G	12	(United States)	Harding, Lindsey	5' 8" (1.73m)	139 lb (63kg)	1984-06-12	Duke	8
G	10	(Russia)	Prince, Epiphanny	5' 9" (1.75m)	179 lb (81kg)	1988-01-11	Rutgers	6
G	14	(United States)	Rodgers, Sugar	5' 9" (1.75m)	161 lb (73kg)	1989-12-08	Georgetown	3
G	5	(United States)	Schimmel, Shoni	5' 9" (1.75m)	161 lb (73kg)	1992-05-04	Louisville	2
C	41	(United States)	Stokes, Kiah	6' 3" (1.91m)	191 lb (87kg)	1993-03-30	Connecticut	1
C	8	(United States)	Swords, Carolyn	6' 6" (1.98m)	215 lb (98kg)	1989-07-19	Boston College	4
G	30	(United States)	Wright, Tanisha	5' 11" (1.8m)	166 lb (75kg)	1983-11-29	Penn State	11
C	17	(Sweden)	Zahui B., Amanda	6' 5" (1.96m)	184 lb (83kg)	1993-09-08	Minnesota	1
G	1	(United States)	Zellous, Shavonte	5' 10" (1.78m)	188 lb (85kg)	1986-08-28	Pittsburgh	7

Head coach
(United States) Bill Laimbeer (Notre Dame)
Assistant coaches
(United States) Katie Smith (Ohio State)
(United States) Herb Williams (Ohio State)
Athletic trainer
(United States) Rosemary Ragle (Troy)

Legend

- (C) Team captain
- (DP) Unsigned draft pick
- (FA) Free agent
- (S) Suspended
- Injured

== Game log ==
=== Preseason ===
2016 pre-season game log
May: 0–2 (Home: 0–1; Road: 0–1)

Game	Date	Team	Score	High points	High rebounds	High assists	Location Attendance	Record
1	May 1	vs. Chicago	L 59–93	Adut Bulgak (17)	Adut Bulgak (12)	Brittany Boyd-Jones (3)	Bob Carpenter Center; 3,432	0–1
2	May 5	Minnesota	L 74–77	Sugar Rodgers (22)	Avery Warley-Talbert (6)	Alston, Warley-Talbert (2)	Levien Gymnasium; 1,028	0–2

2016 pre-season schedule

=== Regular season ===
2017 game log
Total: 21–13 (Home: 10–7; Road: 11–6)
May: 2–3 (Home: 1–2; Road: 1–1)

Game	Date	Team	Score	High points	High rebounds	High assists	Location Attendance	Record
1	May 14	@ Washington	W 87–76	Tina Charles (24)	Tina Charles (11)	Lindsey Harding (7)	Capital One Arena; 11,579	1–0
2	May 15	Dallas	W 79–71	Charles, Rodgers (24)	Tina Charles (11)	Lindsey Harding (5)	Madison Square Garden; 10,120	2–0
3	May 21	Los Ageles	L 72–79 (OT)	Tina Charles (17)	Tina Charles (16)	Harding, Wright (4)	Madison Square Garden; 9,417	2–1
4	May 24	Atlanta	L 79–85 (OT)	Tina Charles (29)	Carolyn Swords (11)	Tina Charles (6)	Madison Square Garden; 14,503	2–2
5	May 31	Minnesota	L 69–79	Tina Charles (23)	Tina Charles (11)	Tanisha Wright (4)	Madison Square Garden; 7,356	2–3

June : 9–2 (Home: 3–1; Road: 6–1)

Game	Date	Team	Score	High points	High rebounds	High assists	Location Attendance	Record
6	June 3	Indiana	W 91–59	Sugar Rodgers (21)	Kiah Stokes (12)	Tina Charles (6)	Madison Square Garden; 8,566	3–3
7	June 5	@ Seattle	W 86–78	Tina Charles (19)	Tina Charles (13)	Sugar Rodgers (5)	KeyArena; 6,240	4–3
8	June 7	@ Los Angeles	L 77–100	Shavonte Zellous (12)	Amanda Zahui B. (8)	Tina Charles (4)	Staples Center; 7,103	4–4
9	June 11	@ San Antonio	W 90–75	Sugar Rodgers (22)	Kiah Stokes (10)	Tina Charles (6)	AT&T Center; 5,219	5–4
10	June 14	Dallas	W 91–88	Tina Charles (28)	Rodgers, Stokes (7)	Tanisha Wright (5)	Madison Square Garden; 7,939	6–4
11	June 16	@ Connecticut	W 80–72	Tina Charles (32)	Kiah Stokes (9)	Tanisha Wright (6)	Mohegan Sun Arena; 4,786	7–4
12	June 19	@ Indiana	W 78–75	Tina Charles (26)	Tina Charles (15)	Tina Charles (6)	Bankers Life Fieldhouse; 7,440	8–4
13	June 22	@ Atlanta	W 90–79	Tina Charles (23)	Charles, Stokes (9)	Tina Charles (10)	Philips Arena; 10,345	9–4
14	June 24	Chicago	W 80–79	Tina Charles (21)	Tina Charles (13)	Charles, Wright (4)	Madison Square Garden; 10,120	10–4
15	June 26	Phoenix	L 97–104 (OT)	Tina Charles (26)	Charles, Stokes (8)	Wright, Zellous (6)	Madison Square Garden; 9,591	10–5
16	June 29	@ Minnesota	W 95–92 (OT)	Sugar Rodgers (30)	Kiah Stokes (11)	Boyd-Jones, Wright, Zellous (3)	Target Center; 7,721	11–5

July : 7–3 (Home: 5–1; Road: 2–2)

Game	Date	Team	Score	High points	High rebounds	High assists	Location Attendance	Record
17	July 1	@ Phoenix	W 99–88	Tina Charles (31)	Tina Charles (10)	Tanisha Wright (6)	Talking Stick Resort Arena; 11,606	12–5
18	July 3	@ Los Angeles	L 67–77	Tina Charles (27)	Carolyn Swords (11)	Charles, Wright (3)	Staples Center; 10,003	12–6
19	July 6	Seattle	W 78–74	Charles, Wright (18)	Kiah Stokes (11)	Sugar Rodgers (7)	Madison Square Garden; 9,852	13–6
20	July 8	@ Chicago	W 88–85	Tina Charles (29)	Tina Charles (9)	Tanisha Wright (6)	Allstate Arena; 5,633	14–6
21	July 10	San Antonio	W 75–65	Amanda Zahui B. (14)	Carolyn Swords (11)	Brittany Boyd-Jones (4)	Madison Square Garden; 9,790	15–6
22	July 13	Atlanta	W 86–62	Tina Charles (18)	Tina Charles (9)	Wright, Zellous (3)	Madison Square Garden; 11,317	16–6
23	July 15	@ Minnesota	L 70–88	Tina Charles (15)	Tina Charles (14)	Shavonte Zellous (4)	Target Center; 8,123	16–7
24	July 17	Connecticut	W 83–76	Swin Cash (16)	Tina Charles (10)	Charles, Rodgers, Wright (3)	Madison Square Garden; 9,464	17–7
25	July 20	Washington	W 88–81	Rebecca Allen (19)	Charles, Zahui B. (9)	Brittany Boyd-Jones (7)	Capital One Arena; 12,778	18–7
26	July 21	Indiana	L 70–82	Tina Charles (25)	Tina Charles (13)	Boyd-Jones, Wright (6)	Madison Square Garden; 11,253	18–8

August : 1–0 (Home: 0–0; Road: 1–0)

Game	Date	Team	Score	High points	High rebounds	High assists	Location Attendance	Record
27	August 26	@ San Antonio	W 84–77	Sugar Rodgers (18)	Tina Charles (10)	Charles, Zellous (4)	AT&T Center; 6,831	19–8

September : 2–5 (Home: 2–2; Road: 0–3)

Game	Date	Team	Score	High points	High rebounds	High assists	Location Attendance	Record
28	September 1	@ Indiana	L 77–98	Tina Charles (22)	Tina Charles (11)	Boyd-Jones, Charles (6)	Bankers Life Fieldhouse; 6,524	19–9
29	September 3	Phoenix	W 92–70	Tina Charles (23)	Tina Charles (15)	Brittany Boyd-Jones (6)	Madison Square Garden; 10,026	20–9
30	September 7	Seattle	L 78–102	Tina Charles (22)	Tina Charles (9)	Tina Charles (7)	Madison Square Garden; 8,159	20–10
31	September 9	Connecticut	W 89–82	Tina Charles (23)	Tina Charles (10)	Brittany Boyd-Jones (8)	Madison Square Garden; 9,482	21–10
32	September 11	@ Dallas	L 81–84	Tina Charles (29)	Tina Charles (10)	Brittany Boyd-Jones (10)	College Park Center; 5,662	21–11
33	September 13	Washington	L 62–75	Tina Charles (22)	Tina Charles (11)	Brittany Boyd-Jones (6)	Madison Square Garden; 8,345	21–12
34	September 16	@ Chicago	L 68–92	Cash, Swords (15)	Allen, Swords (8)	Brittany Boyd-Jones (6)	Allstate Arena; 7,295	21–13

2016 season schedule

=== Playoffs ===
2016 playoff game log
WNBA Second Round: 0–1 (Home: 0–1; Road: 0–0)

Game	Date	Team	Score	High points	High rebounds	High assists	Location Attendance	Series
1	September 24	Phoenix	L 94–101	Tanisha Wright (21)	Tina Charles (9)	Charles, Wright (5)	Madison Square Garden; 10,227	0–1

2016 playoff schedule

== Standings ==
Eastern Conference	W	L	PCT	GB	Home	Road	Conf.
**3** - New York Liberty	21	13	.618	—	10–7	11–6	11–5
**4** - Chicago Sky	18	16	.529	3	11–6	7–10	8–8
**5** - Indiana Fever	17	17	.500	4	8–9	9–8	8–8
**6** - Atlanta Dream	17	17	.500	4	11–6	6–11	9–7
**e** - Connecticut Sun	14	20	.412	7	8–9	6–11	4–12
**e** - Washington Mystics	13	21	.382	8	5–12	8–9	8–8

=== Playoffs ===
**First round** Single elimination (Sept. 21)
5	Indiana Fever	78
8	**Phoenix Mercury**	**89**
6	**Atlanta Dream**	**94**
7	Seattle Storm	85

**Second round** Single elimination (Sept. 24 and 25)
3	New York Liberty	94
8	**Phoenix Mercury**	**101**
4	**Chicago Sky**	**108**
6	Atlanta Dream	98

**Semifinals**; Best-of-5 (Sept. 28 – Oct. 6)
1	**Minnesota Lynx**	**3**
8	Phoenix Mercury	0
2	**Los Angeles Sparks**	**3**
4	Chicago Sky	1

**WNBA Finals**; Best-of-5 (Oct. 9 – 20)
1	Minnesota Lynx	2
2	**Los Angeles Sparks**	**3**

Note: Teams re-seeded after the second round and semifinals.

- **Bold** – Game or series winner
- Italic – Team with home-court advantage

== Statistics ==
Legend
GP	Games played	GS	Games started	MPG	Minutes per game	RPG	Rebounds per game
APG	Assists per game	SPG	Steals per game	BPG	Blocks per game	PPG	Points per game
FG%	Field-goal percentage	3P%	3-point field-goal percentage	FT%	Free-throw percentage	TO	Turnovers per game
PF	Fouls per game		Team leader		League leader

=== Regular season ===
Player	GP	GS	MPG	FG%	3P%	FT%	RPG	APG	SPG	BPG	PPG
Tina Charles	32	32	33.7	43.9%	34.7%	81.2%	9.9	3.8	0.8	0.8	21.5
Sugar Rodgers	33	33	30.5	40.5%	41.3%	84.2%	3.7	2.4	1.1	0.5	14.5
Kiah Stokes	27	0	24.1	64.1%	—	62.7%	7.4	0.7	0.7	1.4	6.9
Shavonte Zellous	33	1	23.3	40.3%	19.2%	85.1%	2.5	2.2	0.9	0.2	8.8
Tanisha Wright	29	28	23.0	40.1%	23.5%	71.7%	2.3	3.6	0.9	0.2	6.7
Lindsey Harding	5	3	22.8	32.0%	0.00%	100.0%	2.8	3.6	0.2	0.0	3.6
Brittany Boyd	33	9	19.7	36.1%	16.7%	72.8%	2.5	3.6	1.6	0.1	6.5
Swin Cash	31	23	19.5	37.9%	12.5%	68.3%	3.4	1.4	0.7	0.5	5.3
Carolyn Swords	34	34	17.5	57.1%	—	68.6%	4.6	0.7	0.2	0.6	5.2
Epiphanny Prince	6	0	13.8	40.0%	36.4%	100.0%	1.5	0.7	0.3	0.0	5.2
Rebecca Allen	21	6	13.3	45.9%	56.7%	86.7%	1.7	0.5	0.4	0.5	5.7
Amanda Zahui B.	33	1	11.3	44.9%	18.8%	78.7%	3.2	0.4	0.3	0.7	5.0
Shoni Schimmel	17	0	4.5	55.0%	56.3%	80.0%	0.5	0.6	0.2	0.1	2.1
Adut Bulgak	7	0	3.3	45.5%	50.0%	75.0%	1.3	—	—	—	2.0
Ameryst Alston	1	0	—	—	—	—	—	—	—	—	—

== Awards and honors ==
Recipient	Award	Date awarded	Ref.
Tina Charles	Peak Performer: Points	September 20, 2016	
Tina Charles	Peak Performer: Rebounds	September 20, 2016	
Tina Charles	All-WNBA First Team	October 14, 2016	
Tina Charles	Eastern Conference Player of the Month	June 2, 2016	
Tina Charles	Eastern Conference Player of the Month	July 7, 2016	
Tina Charles	Eastern Conference Player of the Month	July 26, 2016	
Tina Charles	Eastern Conference Player of the Month	September 20, 2016	
Tina Charles	Eastern Conference Player of the Week	May 23, 2016	
Tina Charles	Eastern Conference Player of the Week	June 6, 2016	
Tina Charles	Eastern Conference Player of the Week	June 20, 2016	
Tina Charles	Eastern Conference Player of the Week	June 27, 2016	
Tina Charles	Eastern Conference Player of the Week	July 6, 2016	
Tina Charles	Eastern Conference Player of the Week	July 22, 2016	
Tina Charles	Eastern Conference Player of the Week	September 5, 2016	
Tanisha Wright	WNBA All-Defensive Second Team	September 30, 2016	
