= 2016 WNBA Finals =

WNBA championship series

Team	Coach	Wins
Los Angeles Sparks	Brian Agler	3
Minnesota Lynx	Cheryl Reeve	2
- Dates: October 9–20
- MVP: (United States) Candace Parker (Los Angeles Sparks)
- Hall of Famers: Sparks: Candace Parker (2026); Lynx: Sylvia Fowles (2025); Maya Moore (2025); Seimone Augustus (2024); Lindsay Whalen (2022)
- Eastern finals: Los Angeles Sparks defeated Chicago Sky, 3–1 (Note: the semifinal rounds as of 2016 were not divided by conference)
- Western finals: Minnesota Lynx defeated Phoenix Mercury, 3–0

The 2016 WNBA Finals, officially the WNBA Finals 2016 presented by Verizon for sponsorship reasons, was the best-of-five championship series for the 2016 season of the Women's National Basketball Association (WNBA). The top-seeded Minnesota Lynx held home court advantage in the Finals, but lost three games to two to the second-seeded Los Angeles Sparks. The series followed a 2–2–1 format, and eschewed from the previous tradition of having the Western Conference champion face the Eastern Conference champion. Instead, in the 2016 season, the top eight teams qualified for the playoffs, regardless of conference. Both WNBA Finals teams were from the Western Conference.

The Sparks won a semifinal series against the Chicago Sky to determine one of the Finals berths; the first-seeded Lynx defeated the Phoenix Mercury to earn the other. Candace Parker was named the 2016 WNBA Finals MVP. Renee Brown, outgoing Chief of Basketball Operations and Player Relations of the WNBA, issued statements following games 4 and 5 saying the referees had made an error in each game. Nevertheless, the Sparks won the series 3 games to 2.

== Road to the Finals ==
=== Standings and playoffs ===
Western Conference	W	L	PCT	GB	Home	Road	Conf.
**1** - Minnesota Lynx	28	6	.824	—	15–2	13–4	15–1
**2** - Los Angeles Sparks	26	8	.765	2	14–3	12–5	11–5
**7** - Seattle Storm	16	18	.471	12	10–7	6–11	7–9
**8** - Phoenix Mercury	16	18	.471	12	11–6	5–12	6–10
**e** - Dallas Wings	11	23	.324	17	6–11	5–12	8–8
**e** - San Antonio Stars	7	27	.206	21	4–13	3–14	1–15

Eastern Conference	W	L	PCT	GB	Home	Road	Conf.
**3** - New York Liberty	21	13	.618	—	10–7	11–6	11–5
**4** - Chicago Sky	18	16	.529	3	11–6	7–10	8–8
**5** - Indiana Fever	17	17	.500	4	8–9	9–8	8–8
**6** - Atlanta Dream	17	17	.500	4	11–6	6–11	9–7
**e** - Connecticut Sun	14	20	.412	7	8–9	6–11	4–12
**e** - Washington Mystics	13	21	.382	8	5–12	8–9	8–8

**First round** Single elimination (Sept. 21)
5	Indiana Fever	78
8	**Phoenix Mercury**	**89**
6	**Atlanta Dream**	**94**
7	Seattle Storm	85

**Second round** Single elimination (Sept. 24 and 25)
3	New York Liberty	94
8	**Phoenix Mercury**	**101**
4	**Chicago Sky**	**108**
6	Atlanta Dream	98

**Semifinals**; Best-of-5 (Sept. 28 – Oct. 6)
1	**Minnesota Lynx**	**3**
8	Phoenix Mercury	0
2	**Los Angeles Sparks**	**3**
4	Chicago Sky	1

**WNBA Finals**; Best-of-5 (Oct. 9 – 20)
1	Minnesota Lynx	2
2	**Los Angeles Sparks**	**3**

Note: Teams re-seeded after the second round and semifinals.

- **Bold** – Game or series winner
- Italic – Team with home-court advantage

== WNBA Finals ==
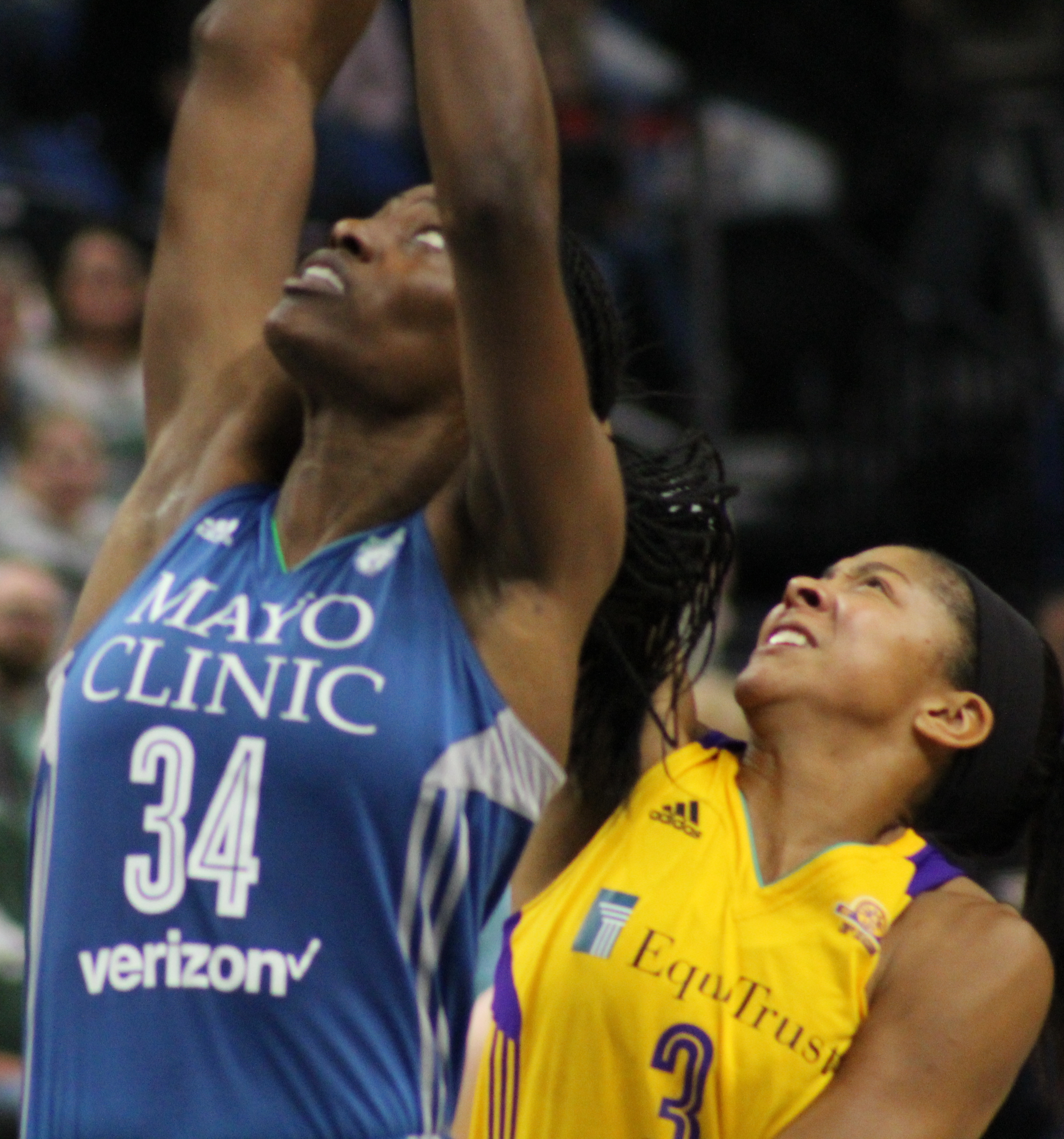
Sylvia Fowles of the Lynx (left) and finals MVP Candace Parker of the Sparks in Game 2

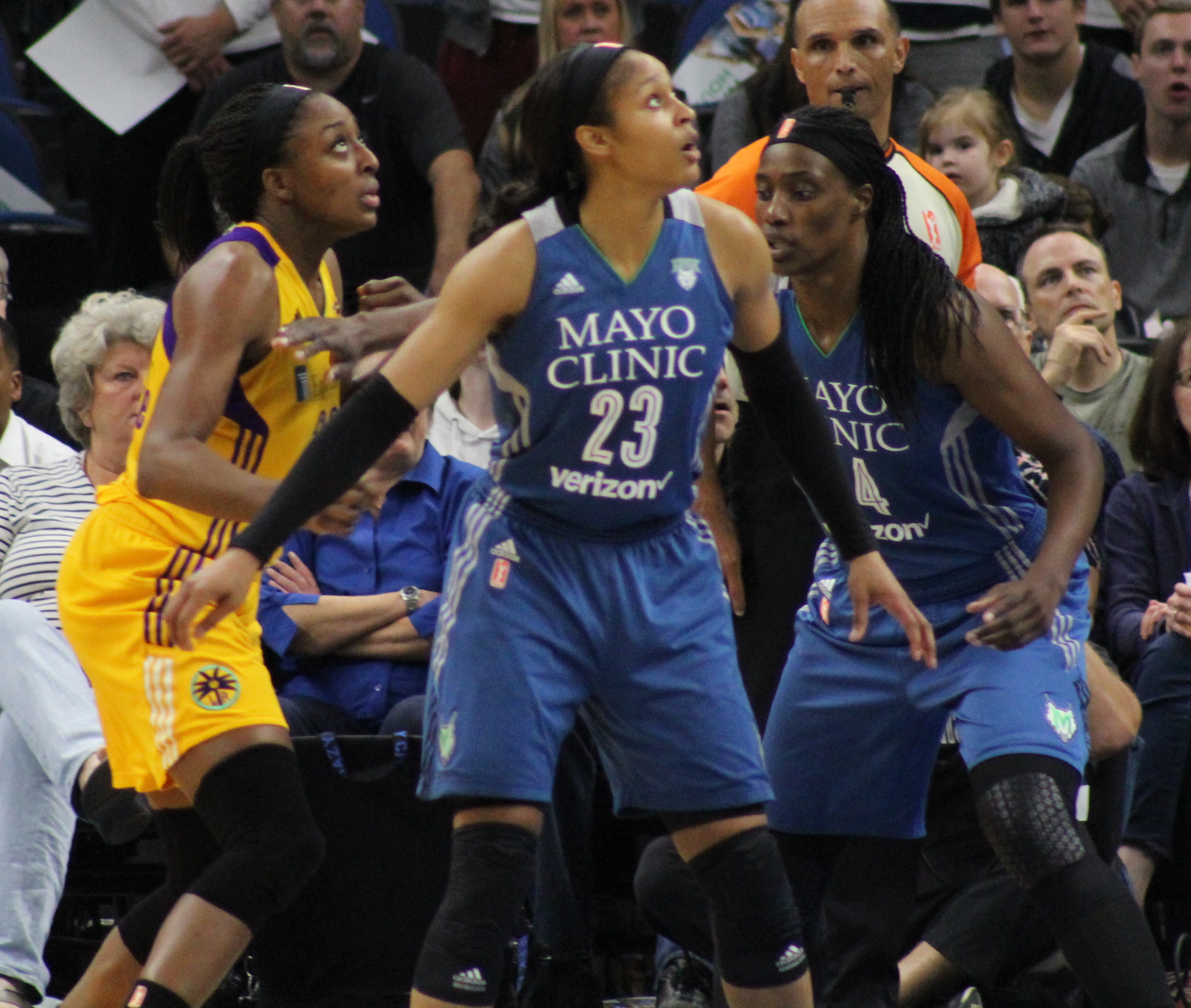
Maya Moore and Sylvia Fowles of the Lynx (right) and Nneka Ogwumike of the Sparks (left) who ultimately made the winning basket

Los Angeles managed to steal Game 1 on the road with a 78–76 victory. Sparks veteran guard Alana Beard hit a buzzer beater. Minnesota bounced back in Game 2, with an effective 79–60 dropping of the Sparks to tie the series at a game a piece. Lynx forward Maya Moore led the charge with 21 points and 12 rebounds. Game 3 took place in LA, where the Sparks put themselves one win away from their first title in 14 years, with a dominant 92–75 win over Minnesota. Sparks superstars Candace Parker and Nneka Ogwumike combined for 45 points on 19-of-33 shooting. Despite home court advantage in Game 4, the Lynx responded to a devastating loss with a narrow win 85–79, forcing a decisive Game 5 back in Minnesota. The game was very close, but with 3.1 seconds remaining in the game, Ogwumike hit the game-winning shot, grabbing an offensive rebound and scoring, to put her team ahead 77–76. The Sparks emerged as champions for the first time since 2002. Parker, the team's number 1 pick in the 2008 WNBA draft, delivered 28 points and 12 rebounds as she won her first ever WNBA championship. Parker was also named Finals MVP.

Game 1

Alana Beard hit a tie-breaking baseline jumper as time expired to give the Sparks the series lead after a seesaw first game.

ABC

Sunday, October 9, 2016
2:00 PM (CDT)

Report

Los Angeles Sparks 78, Minnesota Lynx 76
Scoring by quarter: 21–18, 13–18, 22–24, 22–16
Pts: Ogwumike 19, Toliver 19; Rebs: Ogwumike 9, Parker 9 Asts: Chelsea Gray 4, Parker 3, Toliver 3	Pts: Moore, Fowles, Whalen 18; Rebs: Fowles 13, Moore 6 Asts: Whalen 6
Los Angeles leads 1–0

Target Center, Minneapolis, MN
Attendance: 12,113
Referees: Maj Forsberg, Jeff Wooten, Tom Nunez

Game 2

ESPN

Tuesday, October 11, 2016
7:00 PM (CDT)

Report

Los Angeles Sparks 60, Minnesota Lynx 79
Scoring by quarter: 14–18, 11–21, 21–15, 14–25
Pts: Ogwumike 14; Rebs: Ogwumike 12; Asts: Beard, Carson, Parker 3	Pts: Moore 21; Rebs: Fowles 15; Asts: Fowles 4
Series tied 1–1

Target Center, Minneapolis, MN
Attendance: 12,832
Referees: Michael Price, Billy Smith, Roy Gulbeyan

Game 3

ESPN2

Friday, October 14, 2016
6:00 PM (PDT)

Report

Minnesota Lynx 75, Los Angeles Sparks 92
Scoring by quarter: 17–32, 23–16, 18–22, 17–22
Pts: Brunson, Fowles 14; Rebs: Moore 7 Asts: Moore 5	Pts: Parker 24; Rebs: Ogwumike, Parker 9 Asts: Beard 7
Los Angeles leads 2–1

Galen Center, Los Angeles, CA
Attendance: 8,093
Referees: Tom Mauer, Eric Brewton, Amy Bonner

Game 4

ESPN

Sunday, October 16, 2016
5:30 PM (PDT)

Report

Minnesota Lynx 85, Los Angeles Sparks 79
Scoring by quarter: 22–20, 24–20, 19–19, 20–20
Pts: Moore 31, Whalen 13; Rebs: Fowles 13; Asts: Augustus 5, Moore 5	Pts: Gray 20, Toliver 15; Rebs: Ogwumike 8 Asts: Beard 4
Series tied 2–2

Staples Center, Los Angeles, CA
Attendance: 12,885
Referees: Roy Gulbeyan, Maj Forsberg, Kurt Walker

Game 5

ESPN

Thursday, October 20, 2016
7:00 PM (CDT)

Report

Los Angeles Sparks 77, Minnesota Lynx 76
Scoring by quarter: 17–18, 11–16, 26–21, 23–21
Pts: Parker 28; Rebs: Ogwumike, Parker 12; Asts: Beard 6	Pts: Moore 23; Rebs: Brunson, Fowles 9 Asts: Moore 11
Los Angeles wins WNBA Finals, 3–2

Target Center, Minneapolis, MN

== Team rosters ==
2016 Minnesota Lynx roster
Players
Coaches

Pos.	No.	Nat.	Name	Height	Weight	DOB	From	Yrs
G/F	33	(United States)	Augustus, Seimone	6' 0" (1.83m)	169 lb (77kg)	1984-04-30	LSU	11
F	32	(United States)	Brunson, Rebekkah	6' 2" (1.88m)	185 lb (84kg)	1981-12-11	Georgetown	13
G	51	(Spain)	Cruz, Anna	5' 9" (1.75m)	136 lb (62kg)	1986-10-27	Spain	3
C	34	(United States)	Fowles, Sylvia	6' 6" (1.98m)	212 lb (96kg)	1985-10-06	LSU	9
F	24	(United States)	Hampton, Keisha	6' 1" (1.85m)	171 lb (78kg)	1990-02-22	DePaul	R
F	3	(United States)	Howard, Natasha	6' 2" (1.88m)	171 lb (78kg)	1991-09-02	Florida State	2
F/C	4	(United States)	McCarville, Janel	6' 2" (1.88m)	218 lb (99kg)	1982-11-03	Minnesota	11
G	21	(United States)	Montgomery, Renee	5' 7" (1.7m)	143 lb (65kg)	1986-12-02	Connecticut	8
F	23	(United States)	Moore, Maya	6' 0" (1.83m)	178 lb (81kg)	1989-06-11	Connecticut	6
G	7	(United States)	Perkins, Jia	5' 8" (1.73m)	168 lb (76kg)	1982-02-23	Texas Tech	13
G	13	(United States)	Whalen, Lindsay	5' 9" (1.75m)	166 lb (75kg)	1982-05-09	Minnesota	13

Head coach
(United States) Cheryl Reeve (La Salle)
Assistant coaches
(United States) Shelley Patterson (Washington State)
(United States) Jim Petersen (Minnesota)
Athletic trainer
(United States) Chuck Barta (UW–La Crosse)
Assistant trainer
(United States) Kate Taber (Iowa)

Legend

- (C) Team captain
- (DP) Unsigned draft pick
- (FA) Free agent
- (S) Suspended
- Injured

2016 Los Angeles Sparks roster
Players
Coaches

Pos.	No.	Nat.	Name	Height	Weight	DOB	From	Yrs
G/F	0	(United States)	Beard, Alana	6' 1" (1.85m)	160 lb (73kg)	1982-05-14	Duke	12
F	10	(Russia)	Belyakova, Evgeniya	6' 0" (1.83m)	150 lb (68kg)	1986-06-27	Russia	R
G/F	17	(United States)	Carson, Essence	6' 0" (1.83m)	163 lb (74kg)	1986-07-28	Rutgers	8
G	23	(Serbia)	Dabović, Ana	6' 0" (1.83m)	157 lb (71kg)	1989-08-18	Serbia	1
F	28	(Montenegro)	Dubljević, Jelena	6' 3" (1.91m)	179 lb (81kg)	1987-05-07	Montenegro	R
G	12	(United States)	Gray, Chelsea	5' 11" (1.8m)	170 lb (77kg)	1992-10-08	Duke	1
F/C	7	(France)	Gruda, Sandrine	6' 4" (1.93m)	185 lb (84kg)	1987-06-25	France	4
C	42	(United States)	Lavender, Jantel	6' 4" (1.93m)	185 lb (84kg)	1988-11-12	Ohio State	5
F	30	(United States)	Ogwumike, Nneka	6' 2" (1.88m)	174 lb (79kg)	1990-07-02	Stanford	4
F/C	3	(United States)	Parker, Candace	6' 4" (1.93m)	175 lb (79kg)	1986-04-19	Tennessee	8
G	20	(United States)	Toliver, Kristi	5' 7" (1.7m)	130 lb (59kg)	1987-01-27	Maryland	7
C	21	(Belgium)	Wauters, Ann	6' 4" (1.93m)	193 lb (88kg)	1980-10-12	Belgium	8

Head coach
(United States) Brian Agler (Wittenberg)
Assistant coaches
(United States) Tonya Edwards (Tennessee)
(United States) Amber Stocks (Cincinnati)
Athletic trainer
(United States) Courtney Watson (California)
Strength and conditioning coach
(United States) Kelly Dormandy (Springfield)

Legend

- (C) Team captain
- (DP) Unsigned draft pick
- (FA) Free agent
- (S) Suspended
- Injured

== Controversies ==
After both Game 4 and Game 5 of the WNBA Finals, the league acknowledged that they had made officiating mistakes late in the games that might have affected their final outcomes. Regarding Game 5, the league released this statement: "After reviewing postgame video, we have determined that Nneka Ogwumike's shot with 1:14 remaining in regulation time should not have counted due to a shot clock violation, and that the referees improperly failed to review the play under the instant replay rules." A similar statement was released after Game 4 after the league admitted to have blown an eight-second violation call. Nevertheless, the outcomes of the games remained the same, with Minnesota taking game 4 and Los Angeles taking game 5.
