= Alana Beard =

American basketball player (born 1982)

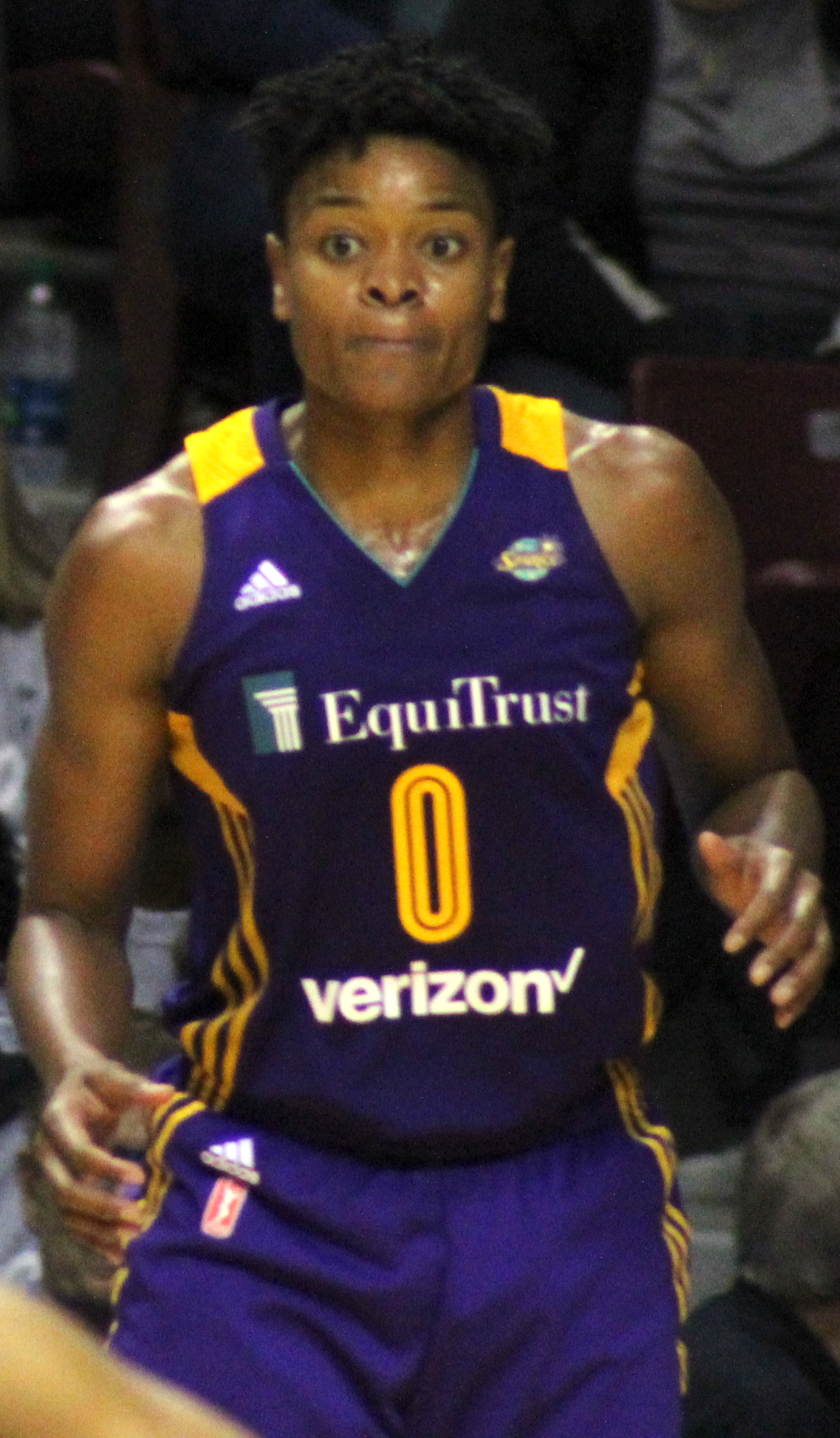
- Beard in 2017

Personal information
- Born: May 14, 1982 (age 44) Shreveport, Louisiana, U.S.
- Listed height: 5 ft 11 in (1.80 m)
- Listed weight: 160 lb (73 kg)

Career information
- High school: Southwood (Shreveport, Louisiana)
- College: Duke (2000–2004)
- WNBA draft: 2004: 1st round, 2nd overall pick
- Drafted by: Washington Mystics
- Playing career: 2004–2019
- Position: Shooting guard / small forward
- Number: 0

Career history
- 2004–2011: Washington Mystics
- 2005–2006: Shinsegae Coolcat
- 2007: Elitzur Ramla
- 2008–2009: Lotos VBW Clima Gdynia
- 2011–2012: Elitzur Ramla
- 2012–2019: Los Angeles Sparks
- 2012–2013: Wisla Can-Pack Kraków
- 2015–2016: Perfumerias Avenida

Career highlights
- WNBA champion (2016); 4× WNBA All-Star (2005–2007, 2009); All-WNBA Second Team (2006); 2× WNBA Defensive Player of the Year (2017, 2018); 5× WNBA All-Defensive First Team (2007, 2012, 2016–2018); 4× WNBA All-Defensive Second Team (2005, 2006, 2009, 2014); WNBA steals leader (2017); Israeli National League champion (2007); Israeli State Cup winner (2007); Polish National League champion (2009); Spanish National League champion (2016); Senior CLASS Award (2004); AP Player of the Year (2004); USBWA National Player of the Year (2004); Wade Trophy (2004); Wooden Award (2004); 2× ACC Female Athlete of the Year (2003, 2004); 3× All-American – USBWA (2002–2004); 3× First-team All-American – AP (2002–2004); 3× Kodak All-American (2002–2004); 3× ACC Player of the Year (2002–2004); 4× First-team All-ACC (2001–2004); 4× ACC All-Defensive Team (2001–2004); USBWA National Freshman of the Year (2001); ACC Rookie of the Year (2001); ACC All-Freshman Team (2001)
- Stats at WNBA.com
- Stats at Basketball Reference
- Women's Basketball Hall of Fame
Medals
Women's basketball
Representing the United States
World Championship
Bronze medal – third place	2006 Brazil	Team competition
FIBA Under-19 World Cup
Bronze medal – third place	2001 Czech Republic	Team
FIBA Under-18 Americas Championship
Gold medal – first place	2000 Argentina	Team

Alana Monique Beard (born May 14, 1982) is an American former professional basketball player. After playing college basketball for the Duke Blue Devils, she was drafted second overall by the Washington Mystics in the 2004 WNBA draft. She signed on with the Los Angeles Sparks as a free agent in 2012. Beard was the 2017 and 2018 WNBA Defensive Player of the Year. Beard announced her retirement from the WNBA on January 23, 2020. She was inducted into the Women's Basketball Hall of Fame in 2025.

== Early years ==
Beard was born in Shreveport, Louisiana, on May 14, 1982, to LeRoy and Marie Beard. She played for Southwood High School in Shreveport, where she led her team to four consecutive state titles. The team compiled a record of 144–6 while she was on the team. She scored 2,646 points during her four years, and finished her high school career with 53 consecutive victories. Beard was named a WBCA All-American. She participated in the 2000 WBCA High School All-America Game, where she scored fifteen points.

== College ==
Coach Gail Goestenkors, then at Duke University, successfully recruited Beard. During her four years, she set a school scoring record of 2,687 points. Beard is the first NCAA basketball player to amass over 2,600 points, 500 assist and 400 steals. During the four years Beard played for Duke, the team won four regular season and tournaments championships. Beard helped Duke reach the Final Four twice in her career. In her senior year, the team achieved the first ever number one ranking in the final AP poll of the year.

== Duke statistics ==
Legend
GP	Games played	GS	Games started	MPG	Minutes per game
FG%	Field goal percentage	3P%	3-point field goal percentage	FT%	Free throw percentage
RPG	Rebounds per game	APG	Assists per game	SPG	Steals per game
BPG	Blocks per game	PPG	Points per game	**Bold**	Career high

Year	Team	GP	Points	FG%	3P%	FT%	RPG	APG	SPG	BPG	PPG
2000–01	Duke	30	509	.512	.196	**.787**	4.5	0.0	**3.5**	0.0	17.0
2001–02	Duke	35	694	**.572**	**.379**	.753	6.1	4.4	3.3	0.7	19.8°
2002–03	Duke	**37**	**813**	.527	.282	.776	**6.9**	3.0	2.8	1.3	**22.0**°
2003–04	Duke	34	671	.496	.313	.778	5.4	**3.9**	2.4	**1.4**	19.7°
Career		136	2,687	.527	.300	.774	5.8	3.7	3.0	1.1	19.8

== WNBA career ==
Beard was drafted in 2004 with the 2nd overall pick by the Washington Mystics. In her rookie season, she immediately became a starter and helped lead the Mystics to the playoffs, despite the loss of star Chamique Holdsclaw halfway through the season. They lost to the Connecticut Sun in the first round of the playoffs 2–1.

In her second season, Beard was named a WNBA All-Star for the first time in her career, while averaging 14.1 ppg, but the Mystics never made the playoffs.

Beard had the best year of her career in the 2006 season, averaging a career-high 19.2 ppg, shooting nearly 50% from the field and was once again named a WNBA All-Star. Her season performance, led the Mystics to a playoff berth but were eliminated yet again by Connecticut in the first round in a 2-game sweep.

The 2009 season would be Beard's final year playing with the Mystics. Following the 2009 season, Beard sat out two consecutive seasons, she missed the 2010 season after undergoing surgery to repair an ankle tendon and sat out the 2011 season with a foot injury.

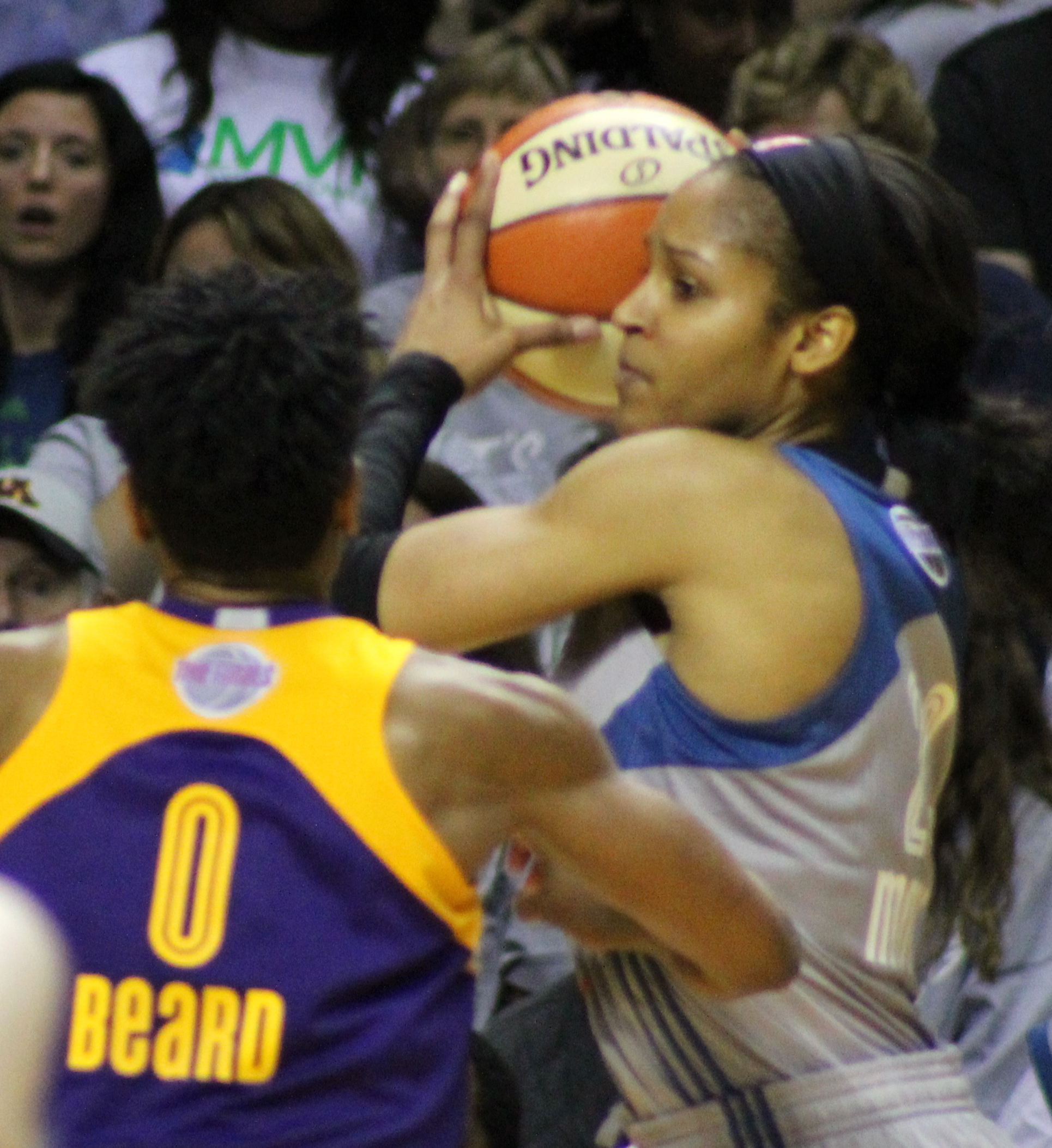
Beard guarding Maya Moore during the 2017 WNBA Finals

After recovering from back-to-back season ending injuries, Beard signed with the Los Angeles Sparks in 2012 during free agency. Beard played the shooting guard in the Sparks's starting lineup. With a supporting cast of Candace Parker, Kristi Toliver and Nneka Ogwumike, the Sparks made it back to the playoffs for the first time in 2 years with Beard's contributions as the Sparks finished second in the Western Conference with a 24–10 record. She averaged 11.4 ppg in 33 games while shooting a career-high in 3-point field goal percentage. The Sparks made it to the second round but were swept 2-0 by the Minnesota Lynx.

Prior to the 2015 season, Beard re-signed with the Sparks in free agency. During the 2015 season, Beard missed the first two months with plantar fasciitis. She played 14 games with 11 starts, averaging 7.8 ppg after recovery. By this time, Beard had already transitioned into playing the small forward in the Sparks's starting lineup. The Sparks still made it to the playoffs but lost 2–1 in the first round by the Minnesota Lynx, who won the championship that year.

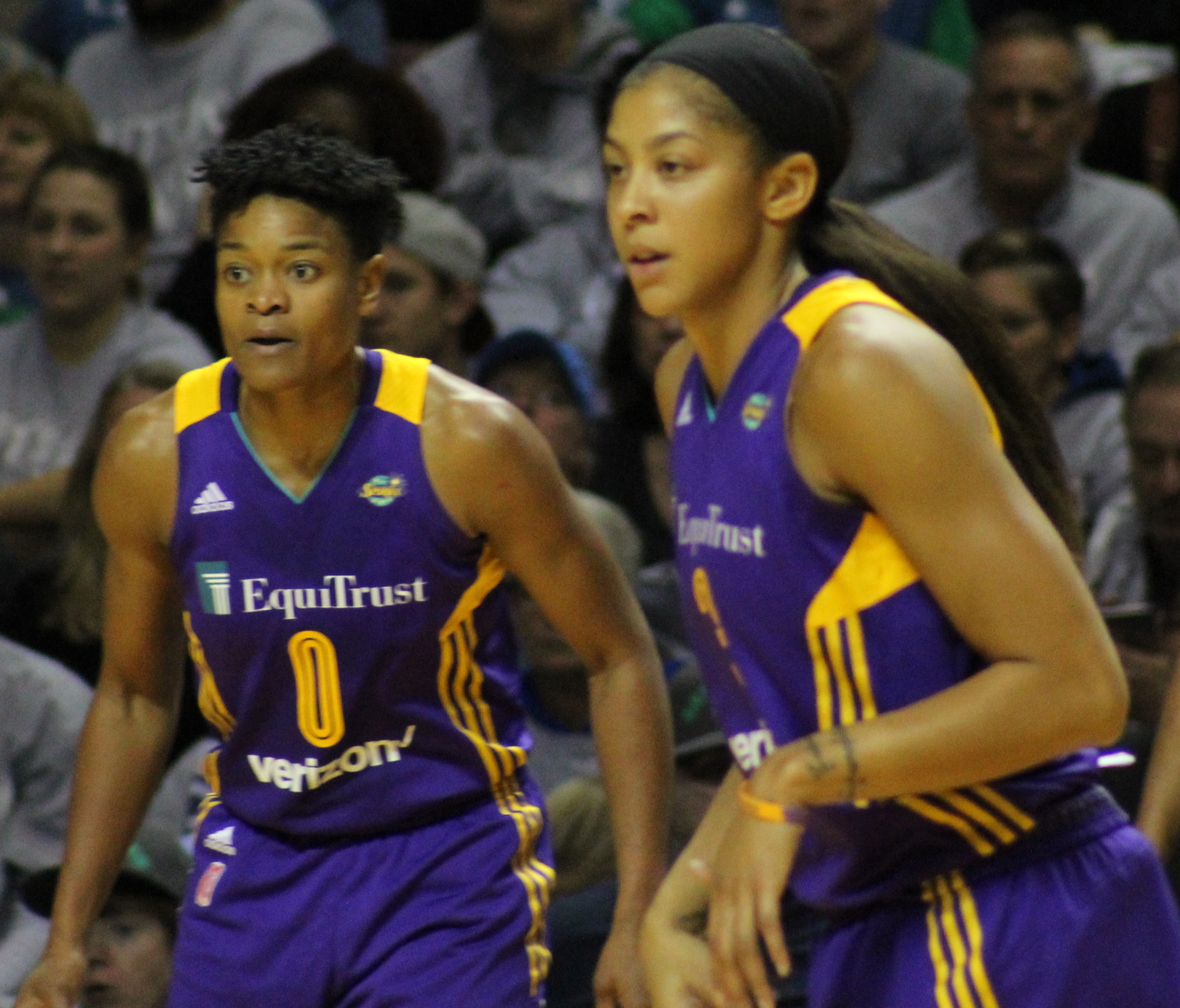
Beard and Candace Parker during the 2017 WNBA Finals

In the 2016 season, Beard would be fully healthy, playing and starting in all 34 games, averaging 7.1 ppg. With the all-star trio of Parker, Toliver and Ogwumike, the Sparks were a championship contender and finished with a 26–8 record. With the WNBA's new playoff format in effect, the Sparks were the number 2 seed in the league with a double-bye to the semi-finals (the last round before the WNBA Finals) facing the Chicago Sky. The Sparks defeated the Sky 3–1 in the series, advancing to the WNBA Finals for the first time since 2003. In the WNBA Finals, it was the second time in league history where two teams from the same conference faced each other in the Finals due to the new playoff format, as they faced the championship-defending Minnesota Lynx. It would be Beard's first career finals appearance and one of the most memorable highlights of the series was in Game 1 where Beard made a game-winning jump shot at the buzzer to give the Sparks a 1–0 lead. The Sparks would go on to win the series in five games, clinching the 2016 WNBA Championship and Beard winning her first career championship.

In February 2017, Beard re-signed once again with the Sparks in free agency. During the 2017 season, Beard would once again start in 34 games for the second consecutive season, averaging 6.9 ppg, achieved a career-high in field goal shooting percentage and also led the league in steals, helping the Sparks to 26–8 record and the number 2 seed in the league. In September 2017, the WNBA announced that Beard won the WNBA Defensive Player of the Year, becoming only the second Sparks player after Lisa Leslie to do so. The Sparks would go on to advance to the Finals for the second season in a row, after defeating the Phoenix Mercury in a 3-game sweep, setting up a rematch with the Lynx. However, the Sparks would lose in five games, failing to win back-to-back championships.

In February 2018, Beard again re-signed with the Sparks in free agency. Midway through the season, Beard suffered a groin injury which kept her out for a few weeks and would make her return by August. Beard would finish the season with a career-low in scoring, but she would end up winning Defensive Player of the Year for the second year in a row. The Sparks finished 19–15 with the number 6 seed. They would defeat the championship-defending Minnesota Lynx 75–68 in the first round elimination game. In the second round elimination game, the Sparks would lose 96–64 to the Washington Mystics.

In February 2019, Beard re-signed with the Sparks for the fourth time. In 2019, Beard was struggled with a hamstring injury throughout the entire season, causing her to only play half the season, also resulting in less playing time and a new career-low in scoring. Despite this, the Sparks were still a playoff team earning the number 3 seed with a 22–12 record, receiving a bye to the second round. They defeated the defending champion Seattle Storm in the second round elimination game by a score of 92–69. However, the Sparks were swept by the Connecticut Sun in the semi-finals.

Beard announced her retirement from the WNBA on January 23, 2020 after a 15-year career.

== WNBA career statistics ==
Legend
GP	Games played	GS	Games started	MPG	Minutes per game	RPG	Rebounds per game
APG	Assists per game	SPG	Steals per game	BPG	Blocks per game	PPG	Points per game
TO	Turnovers per game	FG%	Field-goal percentage	3P%	3-point field-goal percentage	FT%	Free-throw percentage
**Bold**	Career best	°	League leader

†	Denotes seasons in which Beard won a WNBA championship

=== Regular season ===
Year	Team	GP	GS	MPG	FG%	3P%	FT%	RPG	APG	SPG	BPG	TO	PPG
2004	Washington	**34**	**34**	30.1	.418	.375	.718	4.2	2.7	2.0	**1.0**	2.3	13.1
2005	Washington	30	30	33.8	.380	.317	.762	4.3	3.0	1.5	0.3	2.1	14.1
2006	Washington	32	32	31.3	.495	.363	.758	**4.7**	3.1	1.8	0.7	2.8	**19.2**
2007	Washington	33	33	**35.4**	.416	.322	.847	4.2	3.0	1.9	0.7	2.8	18.8
2008	Washington	33	33	33.1	.395	.354	.733	3.6	**3.5**	1.6	0.5	3.2	16.1
2009	Washington	31	30	31.8	.429	.299	.737	4.0	2.2	**2.3**	0.5	3.2	15.9
2012	Los Angeles	33	33	30.8	.436	**.402**	.795	2.2	3.3	2.0	0.3	2.5	11.4
2013	Los Angeles	32	32	22.0	.459	.125	.824	2.3	1.4	1.2	0.3	1.3	6.2
2014	Los Angeles	33	33	27.7	.463	.286	.745	2.6	2.5	1.1	0.4	1.7	8.5
2015	Los Angeles	14	11	26.1	.490	.182	**.900**	3.1	2.7	1.2	0.5	1.4	7.8
2016^{†}	Los Angeles	**34**	**34**	29.3	.467	.342	.692	3.3	2.1	1.7	0.5	1.2	7.1
2017	Los Angeles	**34**	**34**	30.8	**.497**	.316	.804	3.3	2.2	2.0°	0.5	1.3	6.9
2018	Los Angeles	30	30	25.5	.392	.400	.810	3.3	1.7	1.4	0.2	0.6	4.0
2019	Los Angeles	16	3	14.7	.449	.200	.778	1.5	1.4	0.7	0.1	**0.5**	3.3
Career	14 years, 2 teams	419	402	29.4	.435	.336	.766	3.4	2.5	1.7	0.5	2.0	11.3

=== Postseason ===
Year	Team	GP	GS	MPG	FG%	3P%	FT%	RPG	APG	SPG	BPG	TO	PPG
2004	Washington	3	3	34.0	.439	.250	**1.000**	**5.0**	3.0	2.0	**2.6**	3.3	**16.7**
2006	Washington	2	2	32.0	.278	.200	.900	**5.0**	1.0	**3.0**	1.0	2.0	15.0
2009	Washington	2	2	27.0	.308	.125	.667	**5.0**	2.5	1.0	0.0	**0.0**	9.5
2012	Los Angeles	4	4	34.0	.491	.000	.588	2.3	3.5	1.7	0.2	2.5	16.5
2013	Los Angeles	3	3	30.9	.407	.000	**1.000**	4.3	0.3	1.0	0.6	1.6	9.0
2014	Los Angeles	2	2	23.9	.375	.000	.000	4.5	1.0	1.0	0.0	**0.0**	6.0
2015	Los Angeles	3	3	**35.0**	.333	.000	.750	1.7	1.6	0.6	0.2	1.0	6.3
2016^{†}	Los Angeles	**9**	**9**	31.1	.456	**.500**	.778	3.8	**3.7**	1.1	0.4	1.2	8.0
2017	Los Angeles	8	8	32.5	**.510**	.000	.500	3.6	0.9	1.6	0.2	1.2	7.0
2018	Los Angeles	2	2	26.5	.444	.000	**1.000**	3.0	1.5	1.5	0.0	1.5	5.0
2019	Los Angeles	4	0	16.2	.412	.000	.000	1.5	0.0	1.0	0.5	0.7	3.5
Career	11 years, 2 teams	42	38	30.0	.422	.146	.764	3.5	1.9	1.5	0.6	1.4	8.9

== Overseas career ==
Beard's first overseas stint was in the 2005-06 off-season when she played in South Korea for the Shinsegae Coolcat. Beard played in Israel for Elitzur Ramla during the 2006-07 off-season. In the 2008-09 offseason, Beard played in Poland for Lotos VBW Clima Gdynia. In the 2011-12 off-season, Beard played once again in Israel for Elitzur Ramla. In the 2012-13 off-season she played in Poland for Wisla Can-Pack Kraków. In the 2015-16 off-season, Beard played in Spain for Perfumerias Avenida.

== USA Basketball ==
Beard was a member of the USA Women's U18 team which won the gold medal at the FIBA Americas Championship in Mar Del Plata, Argentina. The event was held in July 2000, when the USA team defeated Cuba to win the championship. Beard helped the team the gold medal, starting all five games and leading all scorers with 15.4 points per game. She was the leading scorer in the opening game against Puerto Rico with 23 points (tied with Aminata Yanni) and the leading scorer against Argentina with 24 points.

She continued as a member of the team which went on to the World Championships in Brno, Czech Republic. Beard was the second leading scorer for the USA team (behind Diana Taurasi) with 18.0 points per game. That scoring placed her fifth among all participants. She helped the team win the bronze medal.

== Off the court ==
In 2004, Beard started the Alana Beard Foundation a nonprofit organization that sponsors female AAU basketball teams, aiding young women with the necessary resources to achieve success on or off court. The foundation currently sponsors seven female AAU basketball teams. Six of the teams are located in Maryland called Alana Beard's Future and one in her hometown Shreveport, Louisiana, called the Southern Mystics.

In 2018, Beard traveled to the Philippines as a Sports Envoy with the U.S. State Department's Sports Diplomacy Office. Together with Cherokee Parks, she led a basketball clinic for youth in Davao and Manila. In so doing, Beard helped contribute to Sports Diplomacy's mission to promote leadership and inclusion in youth.

== Honors and awards ==
=== High school ===
- USAT Second team All-America 2000
- Parade Second team All-America 2000

=== College ===
- John R. Wooden Award-Women's Basketball National Player of the Year 2004
- State Farm Wade Trophy-National Player of the Year 2004
- Associated Press -National Player of the Year 2004
- Naismith Player of the Year
- Lowe's Senior CLASS Award 2004
- United States Basketball Writers Association-National Player of the Year 2004
- Victor Award – National Player of the Year 2003
- ESPN.com-National Player of the Year 2003, 2004
- Bayer Advantage Senior Class Award 2004
- Kodak All-American 2002, 2003, 2004
- AP All-American 2002, 2003, 2004
- United States Basketball Writers Association All-America 2002, 2003, 2004
- Women's Basketball News Service All-America 2001, 2003, 2004
- Kodak/WBCA All-District II 2001, 2002, 2003, 2004
- United States Basketball Writers Association National Freshman of the Year 2001
- Sports Illustrated National Freshman of the Year 2001
- Women's Basketball Journal National Freshman of the Year 2001
- CBS Sportsline National Freshman of the Year 2001
- Basketball Times Freshman All-America 2001
- WBCA Player(s) of the Year 2004
- ACC Female Athlete of the Year 2003, 2004
- ACC Women's Legends Class of 2015

=== Professional ===
- 2005 WNBA All-Star Team
- 2006 WNBA All-Star Team
- 2007 WNBA All-Star Team
- 2009 WNBA All-Star Selection
- 2016 WNBA Champion
