= 2016 WNBA season =

- League: Women's National Basketball Association
- Sport: Basketball
- Duration: May 14 – October 6, 2016
- Games: 34
- Teams: 12
- Total attendance: 1,561,530
- Average attendance: 7,655
- TV partner(s): ABC, ESPN, ESPN2, NBA TV

Draft
- Top draft pick: (United States) Breanna Stewart
- Picked by: Seattle Storm

Regular season
- Top seed: Minnesota Lynx
- Season MVP: (United States) Nneka Ogwumike (Los Angeles)
- Top scorer: (United States) Tina Charles (New York)

Playoffs
- Finals champions: Los Angeles Sparks
- Runners-up: Minnesota Lynx
- Finals MVP: (United States) Candace Parker (Los Angeles)

WNBA seasons
- ← 2015 2017 →

The 2016 WNBA season was the 20th season of the Women's National Basketball Association (WNBA). Its regular season began on May 14 when the Indiana Fever hosted the Dallas Wings and concluded on September 18, with a Seattle Storm defeat of the Chicago Sky.

The playoffs began on September 21, with a new playoff format. To increase the level of competition, instead of the top 4 seeds from each conference advancing, the 8 teams with the best overall records, regardless of conference, advanced.

The top two teams, in this case the Minnesota Lynx and the Los Angeles Sparks, each received a double bye to the semi-final round. The number 3 and number 4 seeds, in this case the New York Liberty and the Chicago Sky, received one bye to the second round. The playoffs began with the number 5 seed Indiana Fever facing the number 8 seed Phoenix Mercury and the number 6 seed Atlanta Dream facing the number 7 seed, the Seattle Storm. The winners of those single elimination games, Phoenix and Atlanta, advanced to a second round of single elimination. The teams were reseeded so that the team with the worse overall record played the number 3 seed and the next worse record played the number 4 seed.

The second round of playoffs saw battles between Phoenix and New York in the first game and Chicago and Atlanta in the second game. The winners, Phoenix and Chicago respectively, went on to compete with the top two teams in the league, Los Angeles and Minnesota. Minnesota swept the Phoenix Mercury in 3 games. Los Angeles faced Chicago in 4 games, winning 2 at home, losing the third, and capitalizing on the fourth.

The finals was a Western Conference showdown between the defending champions, the Minnesota Lynx, and the Los Angeles Sparks. It was the Sparks' first finals appearance since 2003, and they were seeking their first win since 2002. Los Angeles won the first game 78–76 on a buzzer beater from forward Alana Beard. Minnesota bounced back to drop the Sparks 79–60 in game 2. Back at home in Los Angeles, the Sparks clinched game 3 with the final score of 92–75, to get to one win away from the title. However, despite home court advantage, the Lynx stormed back to win game 4 at Staples Center, 85–79. In front of a sold out crowd in Minneapolis, the Sparks shocked the Lynx with a 77–76 victory in game five on October 20. The 2016 WNBA Most Valuable Player and Sparks forward Nneka Ogwumike had the game-winning shot from an offensive rebound to put the Sparks ahead with 3.1 seconds remaining. It was the Los Angeles Sparks third title in franchise history.

The league took a hiatus for much of August, allowing for the participation of its players in the 2016 Summer Olympics.

== Notable occurrences ==
On March 15, the WNBA announced a new league-wide sponsor, Verizon Wireless. The Verizon logo appeared on all jerseys except those of the Stars and Sun, and Verizon received significant branding in arenas, on jerseys, and in telecasts via commercials. Verizon also sponsored the WNBA Playoffs, WNBA Finals, WNBA Tip-Off, WNBA Draft, and WNBA Inspiring Women Luncheon.

On March 28, the WNBA introduced new jerseys for the 2016 season. Teams no longer had white home jerseys. Teams used the away jersey from the previous year or a secondary color-based alternate jersey. The Sparks and Stars already used their secondary colors for jerseys, and thus had no significant change. The jerseys included special patches commemorating the 20th season for the league, along with the three remaining original franchises, and showed the WNBA Championships each franchise has won by displaying the trophies on the back collar.

The ESPN Networks aired 14 games (1 on ESPN, 13 on ESPN2) during the regular season and all playoff games. NBATV showed 42 games across the regular season.

On June 25, Becky Hammon's jersey no. 25 was retired by the San Antonio Stars after their game against the Atlanta Dream. Her jersey was the first to be retired by the Stars.

On July 15, Lauren Jackson returned to Seattle to see her jersey retired after the Storm defeated the Mystics. Her jersey was the first to be put in the rafters by the Seattle Storm.

== Draft ==
Seattle Storm selected Breanna Stewart first in the 2016 WNBA Draft at Mohegan Sun in Uncasville, CT. The draft was televised nationally on the ESPN networks (round 1 on ESPN2, rounds 2 and 3 on ESPNU).

== Regular season ==
=== Standings ===
Eastern Conference

Eastern Conference	W	L	PCT	GB	Home	Road	Conf.
3 - New York Liberty	21	13	.618	—	10–7	11–6	11–5
4 - Chicago Sky	18	16	.529	3	11–6	7–10	8–8
5 - Indiana Fever	17	17	.500	4	8–9	9–8	8–8
6 - Atlanta Dream	17	17	.500	4	11–6	6–11	9–7
e - Connecticut Sun	14	20	.412	7	8–9	6–11	4–12
e - Washington Mystics	13	21	.382	8	5–12	8–9	8–8

Western Conference

Western Conference	W	L	PCT	GB	Home	Road	Conf.
1 - Minnesota Lynx	28	6	.824	—	15–2	13–4	15–1
2 - Los Angeles Sparks	26	8	.765	2	14–3	12–5	11–5
7 - Seattle Storm	16	18	.471	12	10–7	6–11	7–9
8 - Phoenix Mercury	16	18	.471	12	11–6	5–12	6–10
e - Dallas Wings	11	23	.324	17	6–11	5–12	8–8
e - San Antonio Stars	7	27	.206	21	4–13	3–14	1–15

Notes

# – Playoff seed
e – Eliminated from playoffs

== Playoffs ==
**First round** Single elimination (Sept. 21)
5	Indiana Fever	78
8	**Phoenix Mercury**	**89**
6	**Atlanta Dream**	**94**
7	Seattle Storm	85

**Second round** Single elimination (Sept. 24 and 25)
3	New York Liberty	94
8	**Phoenix Mercury**	**101**
4	**Chicago Sky**	**108**
6	Atlanta Dream	98

**Semifinals**; Best-of-5 (Sept. 28 – Oct. 6)
1	**Minnesota Lynx**	**3**
8	Phoenix Mercury	0
2	**Los Angeles Sparks**	**3**
4	Chicago Sky	1

**WNBA Finals**; Best-of-5 (Oct. 9 – 20)
1	Minnesota Lynx	2
2	**Los Angeles Sparks**	**3**

Note: Teams re-seeded after the second round and semifinals.

- **Bold** – Game or series winner
- Italic – Team with home-court advantage

== Statistics ==
=== Individual statistic leaders ===
Category	Player	Team	Statistic
Points per game	Tina Charles	New York Liberty	21.5 PPG
Rebounds per game	Tina Charles	New York Liberty	9.9 RPG
Assists per game	Sue Bird	Seattle Storm	5.8 APG
Steals per game	Tamika Catchings	Indiana Fever	1.8 SPG
Blocks per game	Brittney Griner	Phoenix Mercury	3.1 BPG
Three point percentage	Emma Meesseman	Washington Mystics	44.8%
Free throw percentage	Shenise Johnson	Indiana Fever	93.8%

== Awards ==
=== Individual ===
Award		Winner	Team	Position	Votes/Statistic
Most Valuable Player (MVP)		Nneka Ogwumike	Los Angeles Sparks	Forward	31 out of 39
Finals MVP		Candace Parker	Los Angeles Sparks	Forward	
Rookie of the Year Award		Breanna Stewart	Seattle Storm	Forward	38 out of 39
Most Improved Player		Elizabeth Williams	Atlanta Dream	Center	14 out of 39
Defensive Player of the Year		Sylvia Fowles	Minnesota Lynx	Center	19 out of 39
Sixth Woman of the Year		Jantel Lavender	Los Angeles Sparks	Center	26 out of 39
Kim Perrot Sportsmanship Award		Tamika Catchings	Indiana Fever	Guard	29 out of 39
Peak Performers	**Scoring**	Tina Charles	New York Liberty	Center	21.5 PPG
Peak Performers	**Rebounding**	Tina Charles	New York Liberty	Center	9.9 RPG
Peak Performers	**Assists**	Sue Bird	Seattle Storm	Guard	5.8 APG
Coach of the Year		Cheryl Reeve	Minnesota Lynx	Coach	17 out of 39

=== Team ===
Award		Guard	Guard	Forward	Forward	Center
**All-WNBA**	**First Team**	Sue Bird	Elena Delle Donne	Maya Moore	Nneka Ogwumike	Tina Charles
**All-WNBA**	**Second Team**	Jewell Loyd	Diana Taurasi	Angel McCoughtry	Breanna Stewart	Sylvia Fowles
**All-Defensive**	**First Team**	Alana Beard	Briann January	Angel McCoughtry	Nneka Ogwumike	Sylvia Fowles
**All-Defensive**	**Second Team**	Tanisha Wright	Jasmine Thomas	Tamika Catchings	Breanna Stewart	Brittney Griner
**All-Rookie Team**		Tiffany Mitchell	Moriah Jefferson	Aerial Powers	Breanna Stewart	Imani Boyette

=== Players of the Week ===
Week ending	Eastern Conference		Western Conference	
Week ending	Player	Team	Player	Team
May 23	Tina Charles	New York Liberty	Maya Moore	Minnesota Lynx
May 29	Angel McCoughtry	Atlanta Dream	Candace Parker	Los Angeles Sparks
June 6	Tina Charles (2)	New York Liberty	Maya Moore (2)	Minnesota Lynx
June 13	Emma Meesseman	Washington Mystics	Nneka Ogwumike	Los Angeles Sparks
June 20	Tina Charles (5)	New York Liberty	Candace Parker (2)	Los Angeles Sparks
June 27	Tina Charles (5)	New York Liberty	Diana Taurasi	Phoenix Mercury
July 6	Tina Charles (5)	New York Liberty	Nneka Ogwumike (2)	Los Angeles Sparks
July 11	Angel McCoughtry (2)	Atlanta Dream	Maya Moore (3)	Minnesota Lynx
July 18	Elena Delle Donne	Chicago Sky	Nneka Ogwumike (5)	Los Angeles Sparks
July 22	Tina Charles (6)	New York Liberty	Nneka Ogwumike (5)	Los Angeles Sparks
September 6	Elena Delle Donne (2)	Chicago Sky	Nneka Ogwumike (5)	Los Angeles Sparks
September 12	Tina Charles (7)	New York Liberty	Breanna Stewart	Seattle Storm
September 19	Jasmine Thomas	Connecticut Sun	Nneka Ogwumike (6)	Los Angeles Sparks

=== Players of the Month ===
Month	Eastern Conference		Western Conference	
Month	Player	Team	Player	Team
May	Tina Charles (4)	New York Liberty	Maya Moore	Minnesota Lynx
June	Tina Charles (4)	New York Liberty	Nneka Ogwumike (2)	Los Angeles Sparks
July	Tina Charles (4)	New York Liberty	Nneka Ogwumike (2)	Los Angeles Sparks
September	Tina Charles (4)	New York Liberty	Maya Moore (2)	Minnesota Lynx

=== Rookies of the Month ===
Month	Player	Team
May	Breanna Stewart (4)	Seattle Storm
June	Breanna Stewart (4)	Seattle Storm
July	Breanna Stewart (4)	Seattle Storm
September	Breanna Stewart (4)	Seattle Storm

== Coaches ==
=== Eastern Conference ===
- Atlanta Dream: Michael Cooper
- Chicago Sky: Pokey Chatman
- Connecticut Sun: Curt Miller
- Indiana Fever: Stephanie White
- New York Liberty: Bill Laimbeer
- Washington Mystics: Mike Thibault

=== Western Conference ===
- Dallas Wings: Fred Williams
- Los Angeles Sparks: Brian Agler
- Minnesota Lynx: Cheryl Reeve
- Phoenix Mercury: Sandy Brondello
- San Antonio Stars: Dan Hughes
- Seattle Storm: Jenny Boucek
