= 2016 Minnesota Lynx season =

- Head coach: Cheryl Reeve
- Arena: Target Center

Results
- Record: 28–6 (.824)
- Place: 1st (Western)
- Playoff finish: WNBA Finals (lost to Los Angeles 2–3)

Media
- Television: Fox Sports North, ESPN

The 2016 Minnesota Lynx season was the 18th season for the Minnesota Lynx of the Women's National Basketball Association, and the 7th season under head coach Cheryl Reeve.

The Lynx were the defending WNBA champions. Their 2016 roster included five competitors in the 2016 Rio Olympics (Maya Moore, Lindsay Whalen, Sylvia Fowles, and Seimone Augustus of the U.S. squad and Anna Cruz of the Spanish team) as well as seven current or previous all-stars (Moore, Whalen, Fowles, Augustus, Rebekkah Brunson, Jia Perkins and Renee Montgomery) with 22 total past selections to the all-star game between them.

The Lynx started the season well, winning all six of their games in August. The closest game of the run was a three-point home win over Indiana on May 27. The Lynx carried their momentum into June and won their first seven games of the month to extend their winning streak to thirteen games. Los Angeles ended their winning streak on June 24 despite the Lynx having beaten Los Angeles three nights before. The Lynx lost the next two games, including an overtime game against New York to end June 7–3. The team won the first two games of July before losing to Connecticut by four-points on July 7. The Lynx then won their next six games in a row to finish July 8–1 and head into the Olympic break with an overall record of 21–4. They lost again by four points to Connecticut upon their return from the Olympic break, but re-gained their winning ways with a twelve-point win over Seattle. They extended their winning streak to five games before losing at Chicago in overtime. They won their last two games of the season to finish 28–6.

The Lynx' record of 28–6 earned them the first seed in the 2016 WNBA playoffs. As the first seed, they received a bye to the semifinals where they matched-up against Phoenix. Minnesota won the first two games at home eighteen points and ten points. They dominated game three on the road, winning by fifteen points to win the series 3-0. Minnesota advanced to the WNBA Finals where they matched-up with Los Angeles. The Lynx were unable to win game one at home, losing by just two points. They rebounded with a nineteen point win in game two and evened the series as it moved to Los Angeles. The Lynx lost game three by seventeen points, but staved off elimination in game four, winning by six points. The deciding game five was in Minnesota, but home court advantage was not enough for the Lynx to repeat as champions. The Lynx lost the game by one-point on a last second shot.

== Transactions ==
=== WNBA draft ===
The Lynx made three selections in the 2016 WNBA Entry Draft in Uncasville, Connecticut:

Round	Pick	Player	Nationality	WNBA Team	School/Team/Country
2	14	Jazmon Gwathmey	United States	Minnesota Lynx (Note: The Lynx received this pick and Renee Montgomery from Seattle in exchange for Monica Wright) (then traded to San Antonio)	James Madison
2	22	Bashaara Graves	United States	Minnesota Lynx (Note: The Lynx received this pick from Chicago)	Tennessee
3	35	Temi Fagbenle	United Kingdom	Minnesota Lynx	USC

=== Trades and roster changes ===
Date	Trade
February 2	Re-signed Sylvia Fowles
February 2	The Lynx acquired Natasha Howard from the Indiana Fever in exchange for Devereaux Peters
February 2	Signed Renee Montgomery
April 14	The Lynx acquired the rights to Jazmon Gwathmey from the San Antonio Stars in exchange for Jia Perkins

== Roster ==
2016 Minnesota Lynx roster
Players
Coaches

Pos.	No.	Nat.	Name	Height	Weight	DOB	From	Yrs
G/F	33	(United States)	Augustus, Seimone	6' 0" (1.83m)	169 lb (77kg)	1984-04-30	LSU	11
F	32	(United States)	Brunson, Rebekkah	6' 2" (1.88m)	185 lb (84kg)	1981-12-11	Georgetown	13
G	51	(Spain)	Cruz, Anna	5' 9" (1.75m)	136 lb (62kg)	1986-10-27	Spain	3
C	34	(United States)	Fowles, Sylvia	6' 6" (1.98m)	212 lb (96kg)	1985-10-06	LSU	9
F	24	(United States)	Hampton, Keisha	6' 1" (1.85m)	171 lb (78kg)	1990-02-22	DePaul	R
F	3	(United States)	Howard, Natasha	6' 2" (1.88m)	171 lb (78kg)	1991-09-02	Florida State	2
F/C	4	(United States)	McCarville, Janel	6' 2" (1.88m)	218 lb (99kg)	1982-11-03	Minnesota	11
G	21	(United States)	Montgomery, Renee	5' 7" (1.7m)	143 lb (65kg)	1986-12-02	Connecticut	8
F	23	(United States)	Moore, Maya	6' 0" (1.83m)	178 lb (81kg)	1989-06-11	Connecticut	6
G	7	(United States)	Perkins, Jia	5' 8" (1.73m)	168 lb (76kg)	1982-02-23	Texas Tech	13
G	13	(United States)	Whalen, Lindsay	5' 9" (1.75m)	166 lb (75kg)	1982-05-09	Minnesota	13

Head coach
(United States) Cheryl Reeve (La Salle)
Assistant coaches
(United States) Shelley Patterson (Washington State)
(United States) Jim Petersen (Minnesota)
Athletic trainer
(United States) Chuck Barta (UW–La Crosse)
Assistant trainer
(United States) Kate Taber (Iowa)

Legend

- (C) Team captain
- (DP) Unsigned draft pick
- (FA) Free agent
- (S) Suspended
- Injured

== Game log ==
=== Preseason ===
2016 pre-season game log
Total: 1–1 (Home: 0–1; Road: 1–0)
Pre-season: 1–1 (Home: 0–1; Road: 1–0)

Game	Date	Team	Score	High points	High rebounds	High assists	Location Attendance	Record
1	May 5	@ New York	W 77–74	Renee Montgomery (17)	Courtney Clements (5)	6 players (2)	Levien Gymnasium; 1,028	1–0
2	May 8	Washington	L 68–85	Keisha Hampton (15)	Natasha Howard (6)	Moore, Montgomery (4)	Mayo Civic Center; 4,524	1–1

2016 season schedule

=== Regular season ===
2016 game log
Total: 28–6 (Home: 15–2; Road: 13–4)
May: 6–0 (Home: 2–0; Road: 4–0)

Game	Date	Team	Score	High points	High rebounds	High assists	Location Attendance	Record
1	May 14	Phoenix	W 95–76	Maya Moore (27)	Sylvia Fowles (14)	Maya Moore (10)	Target Center; 9,221	1–0
2	May 18	@ Chicago	W 97–80	Sylvia Fowles (24)	Sylvia Fowles (13)	Augustus, Moore (6)	Allstate Arena; 5,034	2–0
3	May 22	Seattle	W 78–71	Maya Moore (17)	Maya Moore (9)	Maya Moore (4)	KeyArena; 9,686	3–0
4	May 25	@ Phoenix	W 85–78	Maya Moore (34)	Rebekkah Brunson (10)	Lindsay Whalen (7)	Talking Stick Resort Arena; 9,368	4–0
5	May 27	Indiana	W 74–71	Augustus, Whalen (12)	Janel McCarville (9)	Maya Moore (8)	Target Center; 7,503	5–0
6	May 31	@ New York	W 79–69	Maya Moore (25)	Rebekkah Brunson (7)	Renee Montgomery (4)	Madison Square Garden; 7,356	6–0

June : 7–3 (Home: 3–2; Road: 4–1)

Game	Date	Team	Score	High points	High rebounds	High assists	Location Attendance	Record
7	June 4	Dallas	W 80–63	Sylvia Fowles (16)	Rebekkah Brunson (8)	Lindsay Whalen (8)	Target Center; 7,634	7–0
8	June 7	Phoenix	W 89–81	Fowles, Moore (21)	Rebekkah Brunson (9)	Brunson, Montgomery, Moore (4)	Target Center; 7,207	8–0
9	June 10	@ Atlanta	W 110–78	Maya Moore (19)	Sylvia Fowles (11)	Montgomery, Perkins (5)	Philips Arena; 5,368	9–0
10	June 11	@ Washington	W 83–76	Seimone Augustus (21)	Rebekkah Brunson (12)	Maya Moore (5)	Capital One Arena; 7,751	10–0
11	June 14	Indiana	W 87–63	Maya Moore (16)	Fowles, Moore (8)	Lindsay Whalen (6)	Target Center; 7,623	11–0
12	June 19	@ Seattle	W 96–84	Maya Moore (18)	Maya Moore (7)	Renee Montgomery (10)	KeyArena; 5,749	12–0
13	June 21	@ Los Angeles	W 72–69	Seimone Augustus (13)	Sylvia Fowles (11)	McCarville, Montgomery (4)	Staples Center; 9,112	13–0
14	June 24	Los Angeles	L 76–94	Maya Moore (28)	Sylvia Fowles (11)	Maya Moore (4)	Target Center; 13,003	13–1
15	June 26	@ Washington	L 63–87	Sylvia Fowles (13)	Jia Perkins (6)	Seimone Augustus (5)	Capital One Arena; 6,322	13–2
16	June 29	New York	L 92–95 (OT)	Maya Moore (24)	Rebekkah Brunson (10)	Rebekkah Brunson (5)	Target Center; 7,721	13–3

July : 8–1 (Home: 6–0; Road: 2–1)

Game	Date	Team	Score	High points	High rebounds	High assists	Location Attendance	Record
17	July 2	San Antonio	W 91–68	Natasha Howard (21)	Rebekkah Brunson (12)	Maya Moore (5)	Target Center; 7,534	14–3
18	July 5	Chicago	W 87–82	Maya Moore (33)	Rebekkah Brunson (8)	Lindsay Whalen (4)	Target Center; 7,433	15–3
19	July 7	@ Connecticut	L 89–93	Maya Moore (40)	Maya Moore (8)	Jia Perkins (6)	Mohegan Sun Arena; 6,739	15–4
20	July 9	Dallas	W 93–56	Lindsay Wahlen (22)	Sylvia Fowles (10)	Maya Moore (7)	Target Center; 7,613	16–4
21	July 12	@ San Antonio	W 81–57	Maya Moore (22)	Sylvia Fowles (8)	Maya Moore (7)	AT&T Center; 11,171	17–4
22	July 15	New York	W 88–70	Seimone Augustus (20)	Seimone Augustus (7)	Lindsay Whalen (8)	Target Center; 8,123	18–4
23	July 17	@ Dallas	W 98–97 (OT)	Maya Moore (20)	Sylvia Fowles (19)	Maya Moore (6)	College Park Center; 5,752	19–4
24	July 20	Atlanta	W 83–65	Seimone Augustus (19)	Rebekkah Brunson (12)	Seimone Augustus (5)	Target Center; 16,132	20–4
25	July 22	Seattle	W 79–72	Maya Moore (21)	Sylvia Fowles (12)	Renee Montgomery (6)	Target Center; 12,124	21–4

August : 1–1 (Home: 1–0; Road: 0–1)

Game	Date	Team	Score	High points	High rebounds	High assists	Location Attendance	Record
26	August 26	@ Connecticut	L 80–84	Fowles, Whalen (16)	Rebekkah Brunson (11)	Moore, Whalen (3)	Mohegan Sun Arena; 7,381	21–5
27	August 28	Seattle	W 92–80	Lindsay Whalen (24)	Sylvia Fowles (11)	Natasha Howard (4)	Target Center; 11,834	22–5

September : 6–1 (Home: 3–0; Road: 3–1)

Game	Date	Team	Score	High points	High rebounds	High assists	Location Attendance	Record
28	September 2	Washington	W 75–69	Maya Moore (27)	Sylvia Fowles (17)	McCarville, Whalen (4)	Target Center; 7,523	23–5
29	September 4	Connecticut	W 93–79	Maya Moore (24)	Sylvia Fowles (8)	Lindsay Whalen (6)	Target Center; 7,632	24–5
30	September 6	@ Los Angeles	W 77–74	Sylvia Fowles (21)	Rebekkah Brunson (11)	Fowles, Moore, Whalen (3)	Staples Center; 7,224	25–5
31	September 11	@ San Antonio	W 81–76	Seimone Augustus (20)	Rebekkah Brunson (11)	Maya Moore (6)	AT&T Center; 5,705	26–5
32	September 13	@ Chicago	L 97–98 (OT)	Maya Moore (27)	Fowles, Howard (7)	Maya Moore (5)	Allstate Arena; 6,050	27–5
33	September 16	@ Indiana	W 82–75	Maya Moore (15)	Rebekkah Brunson (9)	Cruz, Montgomery (4)	Bankers Life Fieldhouse; 8,663	27–6
34	September 17	Atlanta	W 95–87	Sylvia Fowles (30)	Natasha Howard (9)	Maya Moore (8)	Target Center; 11,663	28–6

2016 season schedule

=== Playoffs ===
2016 playoff game log
Total: 5–3 (Home: 3–2; Road: 2–1)
Semifinals vs. Phoenix
Won Series: 3–0

Game	Date	Team	Score	High points	High rebounds	High assists	Location Attendance	Series
1	September 28	Phoenix	W 113–95	Maya Moore (31)	Sylvia Fowles (10)	Augustus, Whalen (7)	Xcel Energy Center; 9,013	1–0
2	September 30	Phoenix	W 96–86	Maya Moore (26)	Rebekkah Brunson (11)	Maya Moore (5)	Xcel Energy Center; 11,923	2–0
3	October 2	Phoenix	W 82–67	Maya Moore (20)	Rebekkah Brunson (9)	Lindsay Whalen (5)	US Airways Center; 9,631	3–0

Finals vs. Los Angeles
Lost Series: 2–3

Game	Date	Team	Score	High points	High rebounds	High assists	Location Attendance	Series
1	October 9	Los Angeles	L 76–78	Fowles, Moore, Whalen (18)	Sylvia Fowles (13)	Lindsay Whalen (6)	Target Center; 12,113	0–1
2	October 11	Los Angeles	W 79–60	Maya Moore (21)	Sylvia Fowles (15)	Sylvia Fowles (4)	Target Center; 12,832	1–1
3	October 14	@ Los Angeles	L 75–92	Brunson, Fowles (14)	Maya Moore (7)	Maya Moore (5)	Galen Center; 8,093	1–2
4	October 16	@ Los Angeles	W 85–79	Maya Moore (31)	Sylvia Fowles (13)	Augustus, Moore (5)	Staples Center; 12,885	2–2
5	October 20	Los Angeles	L 76–77	Maya Moore (23)	Brunson, Fowles (9)	Maya Moore (11)	Target Center; 19,423	2–3

2016 playoff schedule

== Standings ==
Western Conference	W	L	PCT	GB	Home	Road	Conf.
1 - Minnesota Lynx	28	6	.824	—	15–2	13–4	15–1
2 - Los Angeles Sparks	26	8	.765	2	14–3	12–5	11–5
7 - Seattle Storm	16	18	.471	12	10–7	6–11	7–9
8 - Phoenix Mercury	16	18	.471	12	11–6	5–12	6–10
e - Dallas Wings	11	23	.324	17	6–11	5–12	8–8
e - San Antonio Stars	7	27	.206	21	4–13	3–14	1–15

== Playoffs ==
The Lynx qualified for the 2016 playoffs, and, as the team with the best regular season record in the WNBA, received two automatic byes, advancing straight to the best-of-five semifinal against the eighth-seeded Phoenix Mercury. They swept the Mercury three games to none to advance to the 2016 WNBA Finals.

**First round** Single elimination (Sept. 21)
5	Indiana Fever	78
8	**Phoenix Mercury**	**89**
6	**Atlanta Dream**	**94**
7	Seattle Storm	85

**Second round** Single elimination (Sept. 24 and 25)
3	New York Liberty	94
8	**Phoenix Mercury**	**101**
4	**Chicago Sky**	**108**
6	Atlanta Dream	98

**Semifinals**; Best-of-5 (Sept. 28 – Oct. 6)
1	**Minnesota Lynx**	**3**
8	Phoenix Mercury	0
2	**Los Angeles Sparks**	**3**
4	Chicago Sky	1

**WNBA Finals**; Best-of-5 (Oct. 9 – 20)
1	Minnesota Lynx	2
2	**Los Angeles Sparks**	**3**

Note: Teams re-seeded after the second round and semifinals.

- **Bold** – Game or series winner
- Italic – Team with home-court advantage

== Statistics ==
Legend
GP	Games played	GS	Games started	MPG	Minutes per game	RPG	Rebounds per game
APG	Assists per game	SPG	Steals per game	BPG	Blocks per game	PPG	Points per game
FG%	Field-goal percentage	3P%	3-point field-goal percentage	FT%	Free-throw percentage	TO	Turnovers per game
PF	Fouls per game		Team leader		League leader

=== Regular season ===
Player	GP	GS	MPG	FG%	3P%	FT%	RPG	APG	SPG	BPG	PPG
Maya Moore	34	34	29.7	44.8%	40.4%	86.8%	5.1	4.2	1.6	0.7	19.3
Sylvia Fowles	34	34	28.5	59.5%	—	71.7%	8.5	1.2	1.3	1.8	13.9
Seimone Augustus	29	29	26.4	46.0%	33.3%	80.4%	2.9	2.4	0.5	0.4	11.2
Rebekkah Brunson	33	33	24.6	47.7%	0.0%	85.7%	7.3	1.8	0.9	0.3	7.4
Lindsay Whalen	32	32	24.6	51.3%	27.3%	89.2%	2.6	3.8	0.6	0.0	9.8
Jia Perkins	34	5	20.7	36.6%	22.8%	83.3%	2.6	1.3	0.9	0.2	6.4
Renee Montgomery	34	2	19.3	39.7%	32.1%	82.8%	0.9	2.8	1.0	0.1	7.5
Natasha Howard	34	1	14.6	57.4%	20.0%	67.7%	3.6	0.8	0.7	0.7	6.7
Janel McCarville	33	0	12.6	45.7%	18.2%	60.0%	2.5	1.6	0.6	0.3	3.3
Anna Cruz	6	0	10.0	45.5	100%	100%	1.0	2.0	0.3	0.0	2.8
Keisha Hampton	27	0	6.8	33.3%	33.3%	87.0%	0.4	0.4	0.3	0.1	2.6
Bashaara Graves	12	0	3.4	28.6%	—	—	0.3	0.2	0.0	0.0	0.3

=== Playoffs ===
Player	GP	GS	MPG	FG%	3P%	FT%	RPG	APG	SPG	BPG	PPG
Maya Moore	8	8	32.9	51.7%	38.7%	93.5%	7.3	4.6	1.9	0.5	22.4
Lindsay Whalen	8	8	26.6	56.9%	42.9%	83.3%	1.9	3.9	0.4	0.1	13.1
Sylvia Fowles	8	8	31.4	61.1%	—	75.0%	9.8	1.3	0.9	1.8	12.9
Seimone Augustus	8	8	26.9	39.3%	25.0%	87.0%	2.9	3.3	0.9	0.3	11.1
Rebekkah Brunson	8	8	29.3	47.3%	—	79.2%	6.5	2.5	1.3	0.6	8.9
Natasha Howard	8	0	13.0	70.0%	—	42.9%	2.6	0.6	0.9	0.1	5.6
Jia Perkins	8	0	17.6	39.0%	10.0%	100%	2.0	1.9	1.0	0.1	5.1
Renee Montgomery	8	0	12.6	37.0%	44.4%	90.0%	0.4	0.9	0.5	0.0	4.1
Keisha Hampton	4	0	2.0	50.0%	33.3%	—	0.0	0.0	0.0	0.0	1.3
Anna Cruz	6	0	8.5	20.0%	50.0%	—	1.0	1.2	0.3	0.0	1.2
Janel McCarville	4	0	4.8	40.0%	—	—	1.0	0.3	0.0	0.0	1.0

== Awards ==
Recipient	Award	Date awarded	Ref.
Maya Moore	All-WNBA First Team	October 14, 2016	
Maya Moore	Western Conference Player of the Month - August	September 1, 2016	
Maya Moore	Western Conference Player of the Month - May	June 1, 2016	
Maya Moore	Western Conference Player of the Week	July 11, 2016	
Maya Moore	Western Conference Player of the Week	June 6, 2016	
Maya Moore	Western Conference Player of the Week	May 23, 2016	
Sylvia Fowles	Defensive Player of the Year Award	September 30, 2016	
Sylvia Fowles	All-Defensive First Team	September 30, 2016	
Sylvia Fowles	All-WNBA Second Team	October 14, 2016	
Cheryl Reeve	Coach of the Year Award	September 30, 2016	
