= Alex Harden =

American basketball player (born 1993)

Personal information
- Born: May 27, 1993 (age 33) Montgomery, Alabama
- Listed height: 6 ft 0 in (1.83 m)
- Listed weight: 173 lb (78 kg)

Career information
- High school: Southeast (Springfield, Illinois)
- College: Wichita State (2011–2015)
- WNBA draft: 2015: 2nd round, 18th overall pick
- Drafted by: Phoenix Mercury
- Playing career: 2015–present
- Position: Guard

Career history
- 2015–2016: Phoenix Mercury

Career highlights
- MVC Player of the Year (2015); 3× First-team All-MVC (2013–2015); 3x MVC Tournament MVP (2013–2015); 2x MVC Defensive Player of the Year (2013, 2014); 3x MVC All-Defensive Team (2013–2015); MVC All-Freshman team (2012)
- Stats at WNBA.com
- Stats at Basketball Reference

Alexandria L. Harden (born May 27, 1993) is an American basketball player.

== College ==
In the 2015 WNBA Draft, Harden became the first Wichita State Shockers basketball player to be drafted by a WNBA team since Tootie Shaw in 2002. She left as the school's all-time scoring leader with 1,708 points.

== Career statistics ==
Legend
GP	Games played	GS	Games started	MPG	Minutes per game	RPG	Rebounds per game
APG	Assists per game	SPG	Steals per game	BPG	Blocks per game	PPG	Points per game
TO	Turnovers per game	FG%	Field-goal percentage	3P%	3-point field-goal percentage	FT%	Free-throw percentage
**Bold**	Career best	°	League leader

=== WNBA ===
==== Regular season ====
WNBA regular season statistics
Year	Team	GP	GS	MPG	FG%	3P%	FT%	RPG	APG	SPG	BPG	TO	PPG
2015	Phoenix	**32**	0	**12.2**	27.0	**26.1**	**92.3**	**1.4**	**0.9**	**0.7**	**0.4**	**0.9**	**2.1**
2016	Phoenix	28	**1**	7.5	**45.0**	25.0	50.0	0.8	0.5	0.4	0.1	0.3	1.4
**Career**	2 years, 1 team	60	1	10.0	32.6	25.7	86.7	1.1	0.7	0.6	0.3	0.6	1.8

==== Playoffs ====
WNBA playoff statistics
Year	Team	GP	GS	MPG	FG%	3P%	FT%	RPG	APG	SPG	BPG	TO	PPG
2015	Phoenix	**2**	0	**3.0**	—	—	—	0.0	0.0	0.0	**0.5**	0.0	0.0
2016	Phoenix	**2**	0	2.0	**1.000**	**1.000**	—	0.0	0.0	0.0	0.0	0.0	**2.5**
**Career**	2 years, 1 team	4	0	2.5	1.000	1.000	—	0.0	0.0	0.0	0.3	0.0	1.3

=== College ===
NCAA statistics
Year	Team	GP	Points	FG%	3P%	FT%	RPG	APG	SPG	BPG	PPG
2011–12	Wichita State	33	188	45.4%	**40.0%**	74.4%	3.8	1.1	1.2	0.3	5.7
2012–13	Wichita State	**34**	397	46.3%	7.7%	75.2%	5.0	3.6	1.6	1.0	11.7
2013–14	Wichita State	33	**562**	48.4%	38.5%	**86.1%**	5.7	**4.9**	2.3	**1.2**	**17.0**
2014–15	Wichita State	33	561	**49.5%**	24.0%	80.7%	**6.0**	3.4	**3.3**	0.9	**17.0**
**Career**		133	1708	47.9%	27.1%	79.9%	5.1	3.3	2.1	0.9	12.8

== Awards and honors ==
=== College ===
- AP All-America honors
- Missouri Valley Conference Player of the Year
