= 2016 Dallas Wings season =

- Head coach: Fred Williams
- Arena: College Park Center

Results
- Record: 11–23 (.324)
- Place: 5th (Western)
- Playoff finish: Did Not Qualify

The 2016 WNBA season was the 19th season for the Dallas Wings franchise in the Women's National Basketball Association. It was their first in Dallas, Texas after relocating from Tulsa, Oklahoma. It was the third season under head coach Fred Williams.

The Wings began the season with three games on the road, and they won two, defeating Indiana and Washington but losing to New York. Their first game in their new home came against in-state rivals San Antonio on May 21. Dallas won 82–77 to mark their first win in their new home in front of a sell-out crowd. However, they would go on to lose their next two home games to finish May 3–3. Their losing streak extended into June, where they lost their first four games. Two of those losses were against eventual WNBA Finalists Minnesota and Los Angeles. The team extended its streaky performance by winning their next four games, including two wins, one in overtime, over Phoenix. The Wings lost two and won one game to finish June 5–6. Continuing to over around .500, Dallas lost its opening game of July and defeated Phoenix again in the second game. The team then hit a rough spot, losing its next six games to close out July. The streak did include an overtime loss to Minnesota and two five-point losses to Atlanta. The team's fortunes did not turn around after the Olympic break where they lost all three games in August and the first two games in September. They ended the losing streak at eleven by defeating San Antonio. They would only win one of their last three games, against New York. The Wings finished 11–23 overall and in 5th place in the Western Conference.

== Transactions ==
=== WNBA draft ===
Round	Pick	Player	Nationality	School/Team/Country
1	5	Aerial Powers	United States	Michigan State
2	18	Ruth Hamblin	Canada	Oregon State Beaver
3	30	Shakena Richardson	United States	Seton Hall

=== Trades and roster changes ===
Date	Details
February 22	Signed Glory Johnson
March 1	Signed Riquna Williams
March 1	Acquired Erin Phillips, the 5th pick in the 2016 WNBA draft, and the 11th pick in the 2017 WNBA draft from Los Angeles in exchange for Riquna Williams and the 6th pick in the 2016 WNBA draft.
May 11	Acquired the 10th overall pick in the 2017 WNBA draft from New York in exchange for Amanda Zahui B. and the 14th overall pick in the 2017 WNBA draft.

== Roster ==
2016 Dallas Wings roster
Players
Coaches

Pos.	No.	Nat.	Name	Height	Weight	DOB	From	Yrs
G	8	(United States)	Bias, Tiffany	5' 7" (1.7m)	135 lb (61kg)	1992-05-22	Oklahoma State	2
G/F	13	(United States)	Christmas-Kelly, Karima	6' 0" (1.83m)	209 lb (95kg)	1989-09-11	Duke	5
G	4	(United States)	Diggins-Smith, Skylar	5' 9" (1.75m)	140 lb (64kg)	1990-08-02	Notre Dame	3
C	44	(Canada)	Hamblin, Ruth	6' 6" (1.98m)	227 lb (103kg)	1994-06-24	Oregon State	R
F	35	(United States)	Hooper, Jordan	6' 2" (1.88m)	185 lb (84kg)	1992-02-20	Nebraska	2
F	25	(United States)	Johnson, Glory (injured)	6' 3" (1.91m)	170 lb (77kg)	1990-07-27	Tennessee	3
C	3	(United States)	Paris, Courtney	6' 4" (1.93m)	250 lb (113kg)	1987-09-21	Oklahoma	6
G	31	(Australia)	Phillips, Erin	5' 8" (1.73m)	165 lb (75kg)	1985-05-19		8
F	22	(United States)	Pierson, Plenette	6' 2" (1.88m)	195 lb (88kg)	1981-08-31	Texas Tech	13
F	55	(United States)	Plaisance, Theresa	6' 5" (1.96m)	200 lb (91kg)	1992-05-18	LSU	2
F	23	(United States)	Powers, Aerial	5' 11" (1.8m)	170 lb (77kg)	1994-01-17	Michigan State	R
G	0	(United States)	Sims, Odyssey	5' 8" (1.73m)	155 lb (70kg)	1992-07-13	Baylor	2

Head coach
(United States) Fred Williams (Boise State)
Assistant coaches
(United States) Bridget Pettis (Florida)
(United States) Ed Baldwin (North Carolina Central)
Athletic trainer
(United States) Allison Russell (Tulsa)

Legend

- (C) Team captain
- (DP) Unsigned draft pick
- (FA) Free agent
- (S) Suspended
- Injured

== Game log ==
=== Preseason ===
2016 game log
Total: 0–2 (Home: 0–1; Road: 0–1)
May: 0–2 (Home: 0–1; Road: 0–1)

Game	Date	Team	Score	High points	High rebounds	High assists	Location Attendance	Record
1	May 1; 12:00 pm	@ Indiana	L 90–108	Aerial Powers (17)	Aerial Powers (6)	Powers, Schimmel (4)	Bankers Life Fieldhouse; 6,214	0–1
2	May 8; 1:30 pm	Connecticut	L 74–82	Glory Johnson (13)	Johnson, Powers (9)	Erin Phillips (6)	College Park Center; 2,326	0–2

2016 season schedule

=== Regular season ===
2016 game log
Total: 11–23 (Home: 6–11; Road: 5–12)
May: 3–3 (Home: 1–2; Road: 2–1)

Game	Date	Team	Score	High points	High rebounds	High assists	Location Attendance	Record
1	May 14	@ Indiana	W 90–79	Plenette Pierson (17)	Courtney Paris (9)	Odyssey Sims (4)	Bankers Life Fieldhouse; 8,569	1–0
2	May 15	@ New York	L 71–79	Plaisance, Sims (14)	Courtney Paris (12)	Erin Phillips (5)	Madison Square Garden; 10,120	1–1
3	May 18	@ Washington	W 87–77	Odyssey Sims (22)	Karima Christmas-Kelly (10)	Courtney Paris (4)	Verizon Center; 5,618	2–1
4	May 21	San Antonio	W 82–77	Odyssey Sims (23)	Courtney Paris (15)	Erin Phillips (4)	College Park Center; 7,275	3–1
5	May 27	Atlanta	L 93–102	Christmas-Kelly, Powers (16)	Courtney Paris (14)	Odyssey Sims (5)	College Park Center; 4,712	3–2
6	May 29	Chicago	L 87–92	Odyssey Sims (23)	Courtney Paris (9)	Karima Christmas-Kelly (6)	College Park Center; 5,297	3–3

June : 5–6 (Home: 3–3; Road: 2–3)

Game	Date	Team	Score	High points	High rebounds	High assists	Location Attendance	Record
7	June 4	@ Minnesota	L 63–80	Aerial Powers (20)	Courtney Paris (8)	Kiesel, Sims (4)	Target Center; 7,634	3–4
8	June 8	Washington	L 79–87	Aerial Powers (17)	Karima Christmas-Kelly (10)	Odyssey Sims (9)	College Park Center; 4,177	3–5
9	June 11	Los Angeles	L 73–97	Odyssey Sims (18)	Glory Johnson (6)	Odyssey Sims (3)	College Park Center; 5,061	3–6
10	June 14	@ New York	L 88–91	Karima Christmas-Kelly (21)	Courtney Paris (10)	Odyssey Sims (5)	Madison Square Garden; 7,939	3–7
11	June 16	Seattle	W 88–79	Christmas-Kelly, Sims (17)	Courtney Paris (10)	Skylar Diggins-Smith (5)	College Park Center; 4,622	4–7
12	June 18	@ Phoenix	W 117–111 (OT)	Skylar Diggins-Smith (27)	Courtney Paris (12)	Odyssey Sims (6)	Talking Stick Resort Arena; 10,235	5–7
13	June 21	Phoenix	W 100–90	Skylar Diggins-Smith (20)	Glory Johnson (10)	Odyssey Sims (9)	College Park Center; 6,819	6–7
14	June 23	San Antonio	W 97–90	Plenette Pierson (21)	Glory Johnson (11)	Diggins-Smith, Sims (5)	College Park Center; 4,027	7–7
15	June 25	Indiana	L 92–87	Karima Christmas-Kelly (21)	Karima Christmas-Kelly (12)	Christmas-Kelly, Diggins-Smith (4)	College Park Center; 5,206	7–8
16	June 28	@ Los Angeles	L 84–89	Skylar Diggins-Smith (29)	Christmas-Kelly, Paris (7)	Skylar Diggins-Smith (7)	Staples Center; 7,823	7–9
17	June 30	@ Seattle	W 83–78	Aerial Powers (19)	Courtney Paris (12)	Karima Christmas-Kelly (5)	KeyArena; 5,365	8–9

July : 1–7 (Home: 1–3; Road: 0–4)

Game	Date	Team	Score	High points	High rebounds	High assists	Location Attendance	Record
18	July 2	Connecticut	L 83–86	Glory Johnson (16)	Glory Johnson (12)	Christmas-Kelly, Diggins-Smith, Sims (2)	College Park Center; 5,108	8–10
19	July 5	Phoenix	W 77–74	Glory Johnson (23)	Glory Johnson (22)	Skylar Diggins-Smith (4)	College Park Center; 5,480	9–10
20	July 8	@ Atlanta	L 90–95	Karima Christmas-Kelly (18)	Christmas-Kelly, Johnson (15)	Odyssey Sims (5)	Philips Arena; 6,745	9–11
21	July 9	@ Minnesota	L 56–93	Phillips, Powers (9)	Courtney Paris (6)	Kiesel, Phillips, Sims (2)	Target Center; 7,613	9–12
22	July 15	@ Chicago	L 77–84	Plenette Pierson (20)	Courtney Paris (8)	Odyssey Sims (6)	Allstate Arena; 6,012	9–13
23	July 17	Minnesota	L 97–98 (OT)	Plenette Pierson (21)	Plenette Pierson (11)	Skylar Diggins-Smith (9)	College Park Center; 5,752	9–14
24	July 20	Connecticut	L 78–89	Odyssey Sims (20)	Courtney Paris (11)	Odyssey Sims (8)	College Park Center; 4,873	9–15
25	July 22	@ Atlanta	L 88–93	Skylar Diggins-Smith (29)	Courtney Paris (10)	Plenette Pierson (7)	McCamish Pavilion; 4,749	9–16

August : 0–3 (Home: 0–1; Road: 0–2)

Game	Date	Team	Score	High points	High rebounds	High assists	Location Attendance	Record
26	August 26	@ Phoenix	L 72–98	Plenette Pierson (23)	Plenette Pierson (8)	Bias, Diggins-Smith, Sims (3)	Talking Stick Resort Arena; 11,396	9–17
27	August 28	Chicago	L 85–92	Odyssey Sims (22)	Aerial Powers (8)	Plenette Pierson (6)	College Park Center; 5,651	9–18
28	August 31	@ Seattle	L 66–78	Plenette Pierson (19)	Glory Johnson (9)	Skylar Diggins-Smith (5)	KeyArena; 6,771	9–19

September : 2–4 (Home: 1–2; Road: 1–2)

Game	Date	Team	Score	High points	High rebounds	High assists	Location Attendance	Record
29	September 2	Los Angeles	L 79–87	Odyssey Sims (26)	Glory Johnson (15)	Christmas-Kelly, Diggins-Smith, Powers, Sims (2)	College Park Center; 5,176	9–20
30	September 4	Washington	L 83–88	Skylar Diggins-Smith (25)	Plenette Pierson (11)	Skylar Diggins-Smith (4)	College Park Center; 5,162	9–21
31	September 9	@ San Antonio	W 92–84	Odyssey Sims (20)	Courtney Paris (11)	Odyssey Sims (7)	AT&T Center; 7,425	10–21
32	September 11	New York	W 84–81	Karima Christmas-Kelly (23)	Courtney Paris (12)	Christmas-Kelly, Phillips, Sims (2)	College Park Center; 5,662	11–21
33	September 16	@ Connecticut	L 74–107	Theresa Plaisance (22)	Courtney Paris (7)	Skylar Diggins-Smith (5)	Mohegan Sun Arena; 6,228	11–22
34	September 18	@ Indiana	L 60–83	Karima Christmas-Kelly (12)	Christmas-Kelly, Paris, Plaisance (5)	Diggins-Smith, Sims (4)	Bankers Life Fieldhouse; 17,704	11–23

2016 season schedule

== Standings ==
Western Conference	W	L	PCT	GB	Home	Road	Conf.
1 - Minnesota Lynx	28	6	.824	—	15–2	13–4	15–1
2 - Los Angeles Sparks	26	8	.765	2	14–3	12–5	11–5
7 - Seattle Storm	16	18	.471	12	10–7	6–11	7–9
8 - Phoenix Mercury	16	18	.471	12	11–6	5–12	6–10
e - Dallas Wings	11	23	.324	17	6–11	5–12	8–8
e - San Antonio Stars	7	27	.206	21	4–13	3–14	1–15

Notes

# – Playoff seed
e – Eliminated from playoffs

== Awards and honors ==
Recipient	Award	Date awarded	Ref.
Aerial Powers	WNBA All-Rookie Team	September 29, 2016	

== Statistics ==
Legend
GP	Games played	GS	Games started	MPG	Minutes per game	RPG	Rebounds per game
APG	Assists per game	SPG	Steals per game	BPG	Blocks per game	PPG	Points per game
FG%	Field-goal percentage	3P%	3-point field-goal percentage	FT%	Free-throw percentage	TO	Turnovers per game
PF	Fouls per game		Team leader		League leader

=== Regular season ===
Player	GP	GS	MPG	FG%	3P%	FT%	RPG	APG	SPG	BPG	PPG
Odyssey Sims	34	30	31.6	35.3%	28.0%	88.3%	2.5	3.9	1.1	0.2	14.0
Skylar Diggins-Smith	27	25	28.3	39.0%	29.9%	78.8%	1.9	3.4	1.1	0.3	13.1
Karima Christmas-Kelly	34	34	31.6	40.0%	31.7%	79.6%	5.9	2.1	1.2	0.7	12.4
Plenette Pierson	27	27	26.6	38.7%	33.7%	82.9%	4.6	2.0	0.8	0.4	11.9
Glory Johnson	18	6	27.9	44.2%	28.6%	75.3%	8.9	1.3	0.9	0.6	11.3
Aerial Powers	32	2	19.2	39.4%	36.8%	83.5%	2.7	1.1	1.0	0.2	10.4
Courtney Paris	34	32	24.3	54.8%	0.0%	55.6%	8.0	1.1	0.4	0.9	7.7
Erin Phillips	32	12	14.6	43.8%	38.3%	90.6%	1.2	1.2	0.2	0.1	4.7
Theresa Plaisance	27	1	11.9	39.8%	33.3%	63.6%	2.5	0.3	0.3	0.4	4.0
Jordan Hooper	32	1	9.1	37.5%	34.1%	87.5%	1.2	0.2	0.2	0.1	3.7
Tiffany Bias	10	0	6.4	34.8%	27.3%	83.3%	0.5	0.6	0.2	0.0	2.9
Ruth Hamblin	20	0	6.5	25.0%	—	71.4%	1.5	0.2	0.1	0.5	1.1
Brianna Kiesel	14	0	7.4	17.4%	16.7%	75.0%	0.4	1.3	0.4	0.0	0.9
