= 2016 Phoenix Mercury season =

- Head coach: Sandy Brondello
- Arena: Talking Stick Resort Arena

Results
- Record: 16–18 (.471)
- Place: T-3rd (Western)
- Playoff finish: Lost Semifinal to Minnesota Lynx, 3–0

The 2016 WNBA season was the 20th season for the Phoenix Mercury franchise of the WNBA. The season began on May 14, on the road against the Minnesota Lynx. The Mercury began the season with four straight losses. They lost their opening night game 95–76 and followed that with a four-point loss to Indiana and a one-point loss at home against Seattle. They broke the streak with a 93–77 win against Washington. They finished the month with another win to end with a 2–4 record. They began June with two road losses, which they followed with home wins against San Antonio and Chicago. They could not build momentum off those wins as they lost their next game on the road 77–71 against Los Angeles. They then lost two straight, one at home and one away, against Dallas, including a 117–111 overtime home loss. They followed that with two road wins, including an overtime victory over New York, and finished the month with a home win over Connecticut. The team finished 5–5 in June. The Mercury lost four of their first five games of July, with their only win coming on the road against Atlanta. They finished the month 2–1 with defeats of Washington and San Antonio. They went into the Olympic break with a 79–77 loss against Chicago. They went 3–5 in July and had a 10–14 record going into the Olympic break. The team came back from the break and went 3–0 in August, defeating Dallas, Los Angeles, and Indiana, with only the Los Angeles victory coming by less than double digits. They followed those three wins with three losses to start September. They turned their fortunes around to finish the month, going 3–1, with defeats of Atlanta, Seattle, and San Antonio. They finished September with a 3–4 record and a 16–18 overall record.

The Mercury finished tied for third in the Western Conference. They lost the tiebreaker against Seattle, as the season series finished 2–1 in the Storm's favor. This resulted in the Mercury being the eighth, and final seed, in the 2016 WNBA playoffs. As the eighth seed, their First Round match was on the road against the fifth seed, Indiana. The Mercury prevailed 89–78 behind a twenty-point performance from Diana Taurasi. Taurasi turned in a thirty-point performance in the Second Round against the New York Liberty. The game was within two points in the fourth quarter, but a late surge saw the Mercury pull away and win 101–94. The Mercury advanced to the semifinals to face the top seed Minnesota Lynx. The Lynx would go on to sweep the Mercury three games to zero. Game two was the closest of the three games, with the Mercury losing 96–86. Brittney Griner lead the league in blocks, and she was selected to the all-defensive second team. Taurasi was selected to the All-WNBA Second Team.

== Transactions ==
=== WNBA draft ===
Round	Pick	Player	Nationality	School/Team/Country
1	8	Courtney Williams	United States	South Florida
2	20	Jillian Alleyne	United States	Oregon
3	32	Nirra Fields	Canada	UCLA

=== Trades/Roster Changes ===
Date	Details
February 29, 2016	Signed F Sonja Petrović
May 6, 2016	The Mercury traded Monique Currie to the San Antonio Stars in exchange for the thirteenth pick in the 2017 WNBA draft.
June 23, 2016	Signed G Lindsey Harding
June 25, 2016	The Mercury traded Courtney Williams, the rights to Jillian Alleyne and the thirteenth pick in the 2017 draft to the Connecticut Sun in exchange for Kelsey Bone.
June 25, 2016	The Mercury traded Noelle Quinn to the Seattle Storm for the rights to Angelica Robinson.
July 8, 2016	Re-signed G Marta Xargay

== Roster ==
2016 Phoenix Mercury roster
Players
Coaches

Pos.	No.	Nat.	Name	Height	Weight	DOB	From	Yrs
F	8	(United States)	Bass, Mistie	6' 3" (1.91m)	189 lb (86kg)	1983-12-02	Duke	9
C	45	(United States)	Bone, Kelsey	6' 4" (1.93m)	220 lb (100kg)	1991-12-31	Texas A&M	3
G/F	24	(United States)	Bonner, DeWanna	6' 4" (1.93m)	140 lb (64kg)	1987-08-21	Auburn	7
F	4	(United States)	Dupree, Candice	6' 2" (1.88m)	178 lb (81kg)	1984-08-16	Temple	10
G	21	(United States)	Fields, Nirra	5' 9" (1.75m)	158 lb (72kg)	1993-12-03	UCLA	R
C	42	(United States)	Griner, Brittney	6' 9" (2.06m)	205 lb (93kg)	1990-10-18	Baylor	3
G	12	(United States)	Harden, Alex	6' 0" (1.83m)	173 lb (78kg)	1993-03-27	Wichita State	1
G	10	(United States)	Harding, Lindsey	5' 8" (1.73m)	139 lb (63kg)	1984-06-12	Duke	8
F	20	(United States)	Harrison, Isabelle	6' 3" (1.91m)	183 lb (83kg)	1993-07-27	Tennessee	R
F	5	(Serbia)	Petrović, Sonja	6' 2" (1.88m)	169 lb (77kg)	1989-02-18		1
G	45	(United States)	Quinn, Noelle	6' 0" (1.83m)	178 lb (81kg)	1985-01-03	UCLA	9
G	3	(United States)	Taurasi, Diana	6' 0" (1.83m)	163 lb (74kg)	1982-06-11	Connecticut	11
F	13	(Australia)	Taylor, Penny	6' 1" (1.85m)	165 lb (75kg)	1981-05-24		12
G	11	(United States)	Williams, Courtney	5' 8" (1.73m)	142 lb (64kg)	1994-05-11	South Florida	R
G	21	(Spain)	Xargay, Marta	5' 11" (1.8m)	160 lb (73kg)	1990-12-20		1

Head coach
(United States) Sandy Brondello (Western Sydney)
Assistant coaches
(United States) Julie Hairgrove (Arizona)
(United States) Todd Troxel (Doane)
Athletic trainer
(United States) Tamara Poole (Cal State Dominguez Hills)
Strength and conditioning coach
(United States) Kristine Foltz (Iowa State)

Legend

- (C) Team captain
- (DP) Unsigned draft pick
- (FA) Free agent
- (S) Suspended
- Injured

== Game log ==
=== Preseason ===
2016 pre-season game log
May: 1–1 (Home: 0–1; Road: 1–0)

Game	Date	Team	Score	High points	High rebounds	High assists	Location Attendance	Record
1	May 4	@ Seattle	W 81–73	Taylor, Williams (15)	Isabelle Harrison (8)	Monique Currie (7)	KeyArena; 3,721	1–0
2	May 8	Seattle	L 70–76	Mistie Bass (14)	Bass, Harrison, Petrović (6)	Bass, Petrović (3)	Talking Stick Resort Arena; 4,074	1–1

2016 pre-season schedule

=== Regular season ===
2016 game log
Total: 16–18 (Home: 11–6; Road: 5–12)
May: 2–4 (Home: 2–2; Road: 0–2)

Game	Date	Team	Score	High points	High rebounds	High assists	Location Attendance	Record
1	May 14	@ Minnesota	L 76–95	Diana Taurasi (18)	Bonner, Griner, Petrović (5)	Diana Taurasi (6)	Target Center; 9,221	0–1
2	May 18	@ Indiana	L 93–97	Diana Taurasi (32)	Brittney Griner (9)	Diana Taurasi (5)	Bankers Life Fieldhouse; 6,749	0–2
3	May 20	Seattle	L 80–81	Diana Taurasi (23)	Penny Taylor (7)	Diana Taurasi (6)	Talking Stick Resort Arena; 13,048	0–3
4	May 25	Minnesota	L 78–85	Penny Taylor (25)	Diana Taurasi (6)	Diana Taurasi (6)	Talking Stick Resort Arena; 9,368	0–4
5	May 29	Washington	W 93–77	Diana Taurasi (28)	DeWanna Bonner (12)	Penny Taylor (4)	Talking Stick Resort Arena; 9,228	1–4
6	May 31	Connecticut	W 99–90	Brittney Griner (21)	DeWanna Bonner (8)	Diana Taurasi (9)	Talking Stick Resort Arena; 8,412	2–4

June : 5–5 (Home: 3–1; Road: 2–4)

Game	Date	Team	Score	High points	High rebounds	High assists	Location Attendance	Record
7	June 3	@ Seattle	L 81–95	Penny Taylor (19)	Brittney Griner (6)	Penny Taylor (5)	KeyArena; 6,510	2–5
8	June 7	@ Minnesota	L 81–89	Bonner, Griner (14)	Candice Dupree (8)	Penny Taylor (10)	Target Center; 7,207	2–6
9	June 9	San Antonio	W 90–75	Diana Taurasi (31)	Brittney Griner (8)	DeWanna Bonner (4)	Talking Stick Resort Arena; 9,048	3–6
10	June 12	Chicago	W 86–80	Diana Taurasi (31)	Brittney Griner (10)	Candice Dupree (3)	Talking Stick Resort Arena; 9,055	4–6
11	June 17	@ Los Angeles	L 71–77	Candice Dupree (16)	DeWanna Bonner (9)	Dupree, Taylor (3)	Staples Center; 8,964	4–7
12	June 18	Dallas	L 111–117 (OT)	DeWanna Bonner (38)	Brittney Griner (9)	Quinn, Taurasi (6)	Talking Stick Resort Arena; 10,235	4–8
13	June 21	@ Dallas	L 90–100	DeWanna Bonner (26)	Brittney Griner (8)	Diana Taurasi (6)	College Park Center; 6,819	4–9
14	June 24	@ Washington	W 91–79	Diana Taurasi (27)	Griner, Taurasi (5)	Harding, Taurasi (5)	Capital One Arena; 5,136	5–9
15	June 26	@ New York	W 104–94 (OT)	Candice Dupree (26)	Candice Dupree (8)	Penny Taylor (7)	Madison Square Garden; 9,591	6–9
16	June 29	Connecticut	W 86–75	Sonja Petrović (22)	Brittney Griner (8)	Diana Taurasi (6)	Talking Stick Resort Arena; 10,551	7–9

July : 3–5 (Home: 2–3; Road: 1–2)

Game	Date	Team	Score	High points	High rebounds	High assists	Location Attendance	Record
17	July 1	New York	L 88–99	DeWanna Bonner (22)	Candice Dupree (6)	DeWanna Bonner (5)	Talking Stick Resort Arena; 11,606	7–10
18	July 3	@ Atlanta	W 95–87	Brittney Griner (27)	Brittney Griner (10)	Diana Taurasi (8)	Philips Arena; 6,557	8–10
19	July 5	@ Dallas	L 74–77	Diana Taurasi (22)	Candice Dupree (6)	Brittney Griner (6)	College Park Center; 5,480	8–11
20	July 8	Indiana	L 60–78	Bone, Taurasi (13)	Kelsey Bone (5)	Lindsey Harding (3)	Talking Stick Resort Arena; 10,371	8–12
21	July 10	@ Chicago	L 95–100	Diana Taurasi (26)	Candice Dupree (7)	Marta Xargay (6)	Allstate Arena; 7,021	8–13
22	July 13	Washington	W 78–74	Brittney Griner (22)	Brittney Griner (8)	Diana Taurasi (6)	Talking Stick Resort Arena; 10,628	9–13
23	July 16	San Antonio	W 83–64	DeWanna Bonner (33)	DeWanna Bonner (8)	Harden, Harding, Xargay (3)	Talking Stick Resort Arena; 11,539	10–13
24	July 19	Chicago	L 77–79	DeWanna Bonner (20)	Bonner, Dupree (8)	Taurasi, Xargay (6)	Talking Stick Resort Arena; 9,318	10–14

August : 3–0 (Home: 2–0; Road: 1–0)

Game	Date	Team	Score	High points	High rebounds	High assists	Location Attendance	Record
25	August 26	Dallas	W 98–72	Penny Taylor (22)	DeWanna Bonner (10)	Harding, Taylor, Xargay (3)	Talking Stick Resort Arena; 11,396	11–14
26	August 28	Los Angeles	W 70–66	Diana Taurasi (26)	Bone, Dupree (7)	Penny Taylor (5)	Talking Stick Resort Arena; 11,905	12–14
27	August 30	@ Indiana	W 79–65	Brittney Griner (20)	Brittney Griner (7)	Dupree, Griner (3)	Bankers Life Fieldhouse; 7,250	13–14

September : 3–4 (Home: 3–0; Road: 0–4)

Game	Date	Team	Score	High points	High rebounds	High assists	Location Attendance	Record
28	September 2	@ Connecticut	L 74–87	Brittney Griner (29)	Candice Dupree (10)	Harding, Taurasi, Taylor (3)	Mohegan Sun Arena; 6,709	13–15
29	September 3	@ New York	L 70–92	Marta Xargay (16)	Candice Dupree (8)	DeWanna Bonner (4)	Madison Square Garden; 10,026	13–16
30	September 6	@ Atlanta	L 87–91	Diana Taurasi (23)	DeWanna Bonner (7)	DeWanna Bonner (7)	Philips Arena; 3,625	13–17
31	September 11	Atlanta	W 86–75	Brittney Griner (21)	Brittney Griner (9)	Bonner, Xargay (6)	Talking Stick Resort Arena; 9,877	14–17
32	September 14	@ Los Angeles	L 85–90	DeWanna Bonner (20)	Brittney Griner (16)	Marta Xargay (6)	Staples Center; 9,371	14–18
33	September 15	Seattle	W 86–62	Brittney Griner (21)	DeWanna Bonner (9)	Diana Taurasi (5)	Talking Stick Resort Arena; 10,380	15–18
34	September 18	San Antonio	W 81–65	Diana Taurasi (18)	Brittney Griner (7)	Taurasi, Taylor (4)	AT&T Center; 6,397	16–18

2016 season schedule

=== Playoffs ===
2016 playoff game log
First Round
vs. Indiana Fever

Game	Date	Team	Score	High points	High rebounds	High assists	Location Attendance	Series
1	September 21	@ Indiana	W 89–78	Diana Taurasi (20)	Brittney Griner (9)	Penny Taylor (4)	Bankers Life Fieldhouse; 6,282	1–0

Second Round
vs. New York Liberty

Game	Date	Team	Score	High points	High rebounds	High assists	Location Attendance	Series
1	September 24	@ New York	W 101–94	Diana Taurasi (30)	Brittney Griner (10)	Brittney Griner (5)	Madison Square Garden; 10,227	1–0

Semifinals vs. Minnesota Lynx
Lost Series 0–3

Game	Date	Team	Score	High points	High rebounds	High assists	Location Attendance	Series
1	September 28	@ Minnesota	L 95–113	Diana Taurasi (25)	Penny Taylor (5)	Dupree, Harding (5)	Xcel Energy Center; 9,013	0–1
2	September 30	@ Minnesota	L 86–96	Diana Taurasi (31)	Isabelle Harrison (9)	Penny Taylor (5)	Xcel Energy Center; 11,923	0–2
3	October 2	Minnesota	L 67–82	Bonner, Taurasi (12)	Griner, Harrison (7)	Marta Xargay (5)	Talking Stick Resort Arena; 9,631	0–3

2016 playoff schedule

== Standings ==
Western Conference	W	L	PCT	GB	Home	Road	Conf.
**1** - Minnesota Lynx	28	6	.824	—	15–2	13–4	15–1
**2** - Los Angeles Sparks	26	8	.765	2	14–3	12–5	11–5
**7** - Seattle Storm	16	18	.471	12	10–7	6–11	7–9
**8** - Phoenix Mercury	16	18	.471	12	11–6	5–12	6–10
**e** - Dallas Wings	11	23	.324	17	6–11	5–12	8–8
**e** - San Antonio Stars	7	27	.206	21	4–13	3–14	1–15

=== Playoffs ===
**First round** Single elimination (Sept. 21)
5	Indiana Fever	78
8	**Phoenix Mercury**	**89**
6	**Atlanta Dream**	**94**
7	Seattle Storm	85

**Second round** Single elimination (Sept. 24 and 25)
3	New York Liberty	94
8	**Phoenix Mercury**	**101**
4	**Chicago Sky**	**108**
6	Atlanta Dream	98

**Semifinals**; Best-of-5 (Sept. 28 – Oct. 6)
1	**Minnesota Lynx**	**3**
8	Phoenix Mercury	0
2	**Los Angeles Sparks**	**3**
4	Chicago Sky	1

**WNBA Finals**; Best-of-5 (Oct. 9 – 20)
1	Minnesota Lynx	2
2	**Los Angeles Sparks**	**3**

Note: Teams re-seeded after the second round and semifinals.

- **Bold** – Game or series winner
- Italic – Team with home-court advantage

== Statistics ==
Legend
GP	Games played	GS	Games started	MPG	Minutes per game	RPG	Rebounds per game
APG	Assists per game	SPG	Steals per game	BPG	Blocks per game	PPG	Points per game
FG%	Field-goal percentage	3P%	3-point field-goal percentage	FT%	Free-throw percentage	TO	Turnovers per game
PF	Fouls per game		Team leader		League leader

=== Regular season ===
Player	GP	GS	MPG	FG%	3P%	FT%	RPG	APG	SPG	BPG	PPG
DeWanna Bonner	34	24	31.3	42.4%	32.9%	79.8%	5.4	2.4	1.3	0.6	14.5
Diana Taurasi	33	33	29.8	39.6%	35.0%	90.9%	3.0	3.9	0.9	0.1	17.8
Brittney Griner	34	34	29.2	54.8%	—	83.1%	6.5	1.0	0.4	3.1	14.5
Candice Dupree	32	32	29.1	54.1%	0.0%	79.2%	5.3	1.9	0.8	0.2	11.3
Penny Taylor	25	25	25.7	48.8%	39.6%	90.7%	3.8	3.6	1.5	0.4	12.5
Marta Xargay	15	6	19.7	40.0%	33.3%	70.6%	1.7	2.7	1.1	0.2	5.7
Lindsey Harding	21	0	15.7	37.0%	40.0%	87.0%	1.7	2.1	0.5	0.1	3.9
Sonja Petrović	31	13	14.8	42.1%	34.4%	95.7%	2.2	0.6	0.6	0.2	5.1
Mistie Bass	33	1	13.2	46.3%	—	81.5%	1.9	0.8	0.5	0.3	2.9
Noelle Quinn	13	0	9.9	24.1%	10.0%	85.7%	0.9	1.4	0.4	0.2	1.6
Kelsey Bone	20	0	9.7	38.8%	0.0%	70.0%	2.5	0.6	0.2	0.1	3.0
Alex Harden	28	1	7.5	45.0%	25.0%	50.0%	0.8	0.5	0.4	0.1	1.4
Isabelle Harrison	26	1	7.5	52.5%	—	68.0%	1.8	0.0	0.4	0.1	3.1
Nirra Fields	4	0	4.3	14.3%	0.0%	50.0%	—	—	—	—	0.8
Courtney Williams	6	0	4.2	11.1%	0.0%	50.0%	1.2	0.3	—	—	0.5

=== Playoffs ===
Player	GP	GS	MPG	FG%	3P%	FT%	RPG	APG	SPG	BPG	PPG
Candice Dupree	5	5	31.4	48.8%	—	100.0%	3.8	1.8	0.6	0.2	9.6
Brittney Griner	5	5	31.2	64.3%	—	81.3%	6.0	1.6	0.6	2.2	13.4
Diana Taurasi	5	5	30.8	51.5%	43.2%	97.0%	2.6	2.8	0.2	0.6	23.6
Penny Taylor	5	5	26.0	36.8%	31.3%	95.8%	4.4	3.0	1.6	0.8	11.2
DeWanna Bonner	5	0	24.2	42.6%	0.0%	82.4%	4.2	1.6	1.0	0.0	10.8
Marta Xargay	5	5	24.2	44.4%	27.3%	80.0%	1.8	3.8	0.4	0.0	7.8
Isabelle Harrison	3	0	13.7	61.5%	—	0.0%	6.0	—	—	—	5.3
Sonja Petrović	2	0	12.5	44.4%	75.0%	0.0%	1.0	2.5	0.5	—	5.5
Lindsey Harding	5	0	9.2	46.2%	0.0%	0.0%	0.4	1.4	—	0.2	2.4
Mistie Bass	5	0	7.8	33.3%	—	100.0%	1.4	0.8	0.2	—	1.6
Kelsey Bone	2	0	4.0	100.0%	—	—	0.5	—	—	—	2.0
Alex Harden	2	0	2.0	100.0%	100.0%	—	—	—	—	—	2.5

== Awards and honors ==
Recipient	Award	Date Awarded	Ref.
Diana Taurasi	All-WNBA Second Team	October 14, 2016	
Diana Taurasi	Western Conference Player of the Week	June 27, 2016	
Brittney Griner	WNBA All-Defensive Second Team	September 30, 2016	
