= 2016 Chicago Sky season =

- Head coach: Pokey Chatman
- Arena: Allstate Arena

Results
- Record: 18–16 (.529)
- Place: 2nd (Eastern)
- Playoff finish: Fourth Seed, Lost in Semifinals to Los Angeles 3–1

Media
- Television: WMEU-CD; ESPN; ESPN2; NBA TV

The 2016 Chicago Sky season was the franchise's 11th season in the Women's National Basketball Association (WNBA). The season began on May 14, at home against the Connecticut Sun.

The Sky began the season with a win, but could not sustain that momentum and lost their next four games. They finished May with a win and extended their streak with three wins to start June. However, they only won one of their final five games in June to finish the first two months of the season with a 6–9 record. The Sky split a home and away matchup with Washington to begin July and lost two of their next three. The won three of their last four to end the month with a 5–4 record. The Sky came out of the Olympic break strongly, winning both their games in August and their first two in September. They lost their next two, before winning three in a row. They could not overcome Seattle on the final day of the season and finished with an 18–16 regular season record.

Their record was good enough for second place in the Eastern Conference and the fourth overall seed in the 2016 WNBA Playoffs. They earned a bye into the Second Round where they defeated sixth-seed Atlanta 108–98 and advanced to the Semifinals. There they matched-up against the Los Angeles Sparks. The Sparks defeated the Sky 3 games to 1 and would go on to finish as WNBA Champions.

== Transactions ==
=== WNBA draft ===
Round	Pick	Player	Nationality	School/team/country
1	10	Imani Boyette	United States	Texas
3	34	Jordan Jones	United States	Texas A&M

=== Trades and Roster Changes ===
Date	Transaction
January 7, 2016	Extended Qualifying Offers to Jessica Breland, Clarissa dos Santos, and Jacki Gemelos
January 7, 2016	Exercised 4th-Year Team Option on Jamierra Faulkner
February 9, 2016	Signed Jessica Breland
February 11, 2016	Signed Clarissa dos Santos to a training-camp contract
March 7, 2016	Signed Yvonne Turner, Jacki Gemelos, and Shanece McKinney to training-camp contracts
April 21, 2016	Signed Imani McGee-Stafford and Jordan Jones to rookie-scale contracts
April 21, 2016	Signed Maggie Lyon to a training-camp contract
April 28, 2016	Waived Maggie Lyon
May 6, 2016	Waived Jacki Gemelos and Jordan Jones
May 11, 2016	Waived Shanece McKinney
May 12, 2016	Waived Yvonne Turner

== Roster ==
2016 Chicago Sky roster
Players
Coaches

Pos.	No.	Nat.	Name	Height	Weight	DOB	From	Yrs
C	34	(United States)	Boyette, Imani	6' 7" (2.01m)	195 lb (88kg)	October 11, 1994 (aged 21)	Texas	R
F	51	(United States)	Breland, Jessica	6' 3" (1.91m)	170 lb (77kg)	February 23, 1988 (aged 28)	North Carolina	4
F/C	41	(Brazil)	de Souza, Érika	6' 5" (1.96m)	190 lb (86kg)	March 3, 1982 (aged 34)	Brazil	10
G/F	11	(United States)	Delle Donne, Elena	6' 5" (1.96m)	188 lb (85kg)	September 5, 1989 (aged 26)	Delaware	3
C	8	(Brazil)	dos Santos, Clarissa	6' 1" (1.85m)	196 lb (89kg)	March 10, 1988 (aged 28)	Brazil	1
G	21	(United States)	Faulkner, Jamierra	5' 6" (1.68m)	141 lb (64kg)	March 9, 1992 (aged 24)	Southern Miss	2
G/F	44	(United States)	Laney, Betnijah	6' 0" (1.83m)	160 lb (73kg)	October 29, 1993 (aged 22)	Rutgers	1
F	32	(United States)	Parker, Cheyenne	6' 4" (1.93m)	190 lb (86kg)	August 22, 1992 (aged 23)	Middle Tennessee	1
G	23	(United States)	Pondexter, Cappie	5' 9" (1.75m)	160 lb (73kg)	January 7, 1983 (aged 33)	Rutgers	10
G	14	(United States)	Quigley, Allie	5' 10" (1.78m)	140 lb (64kg)	June 20, 1986 (aged 29)	DePaul	7
G	22	(United States)	Vandersloot, Courtney	5' 8" (1.73m)	145 lb (66kg)	February 8, 1989 (aged 27)	Gonzaga	5
F	1	(United States)	Young, Tamera	6' 2" (1.88m)	170 lb (77kg)	October 30, 1986 (aged 29)	James Madison	8

Head coach
(United States) Pokey Chatman (LSU)
Assistant coaches
(United States) Jonah Herscu (Lake Forest College)
(United States) Christie Sides (Louisiana Tech)
Athletic trainer
(United States) Heidi Wlezien
Strength and conditioning coach
(United States) Ann Crosby (Western Michigan)

Legend

- (C) Team captain
- (DP) Unsigned draft pick
- (FA) Free agent
- (S) Suspended
- Injured;Notes
- Age of player is as of the start of the regular season.

=== Depth ===
Pos.	Starter	Bench
C	Erika de Souza	Imani McGee-Stafford; Clarissa dos Santos
PF	Elena Delle Donne	Jessica Breland; Cheyenne Parker
SF	Tamera Young	Betnijah Laney
SG	Cappie Pondexter	Allie Quigley
PG	Courtney Vandersloot	Jamierra Faulkner

== Schedule ==
=== Preseason ===
2016 pre-season game log
May: 2–1 (Home: 2–0; Road: 0–1)

Game	Date	Team	Score	High points	High rebounds	High assists	Location Attendance	Record
1	May 1	New York	W 93–59	Elena Delle Donne (17)	Betnijah Laney (7)	Courtney Vandersloot (4)	Bob Carpenter Center; 3,432	1–0
2	May 4	Connecticut	L 84–81	Elena Delle Donne (13)	Jessica Breland (6)	Jamierra Faulkner (5)	Mohegan Sun Arena; 4,207	1–1
3	May 5	Atlanta	W 95–75	Betnijah Laney (14)	Cheyenne Parker (5)	Courtney Vandersloot (6)	Mohegan Sun Arena; 4,025	2–1

2016 pre-season schedule

=== Regular season ===
2016 game log
Total: 18–16 (Home: 11–6; Road: 7–10)
May: 2–4 (Home: 1–2; Road: 1–2)

Game	Date	Team	Score	High points	High rebounds	High assists	Location Attendance	Record
1	May 14	Connecticut	W 93–70	Vandersloot (14)	Breland (9)	Vandersloot (7)	Allstate Arena; 6,719	1–0
2	May 18	Minnesota	L 80–97	Delle Donne (28)	Delle Donne; Young (6)	Vandersloot (11)	Allstate Arena; 5,034	1–1
3	May 22	@ Atlanta	L 81–87	Pondexter (17)	Breland (10)	Pondexter (5)	Philips Arena; 6,152	1–2
4	May 24	Los Angeles	W 80–93	Faulkner 17	Breland; Young (9)	Faulkner (10)	Allstate Arena; 5,554	1–3
5	May 27	@ San Antonio	L 78–79	Delle Donne (27)	de Souza; Delle Donne (9)	Faulkner (11)	AT&T Center; 5,210	1–4
6	May 29	@ Dallas	W 92–87	Pondexter (18)	Boyette (8)	Faulkner (9)	College Park Center; 5,297	2–4

June: 4–5 (Home: 2–1; Road: 2–4)

Game	Date	Team	Score	High points	High rebounds	High assists	Location Attendance	Record
7	June 1; 6:00 PM (Note: All times are specified as Central Time.)	@ Washington	W 86–78	Delle Donne (18)	Delle Donne (9)	Vandersloot (8)	Verizon Center; 5,649	3–4
8	June 3; 7:30 PM	Washington	W 98–72	Delle Donne (18)	de Souza (7)	Faulkner (9)	Allstate Arena; 5,489	4–4
9	June 10; 6:00 PM	@ Indiana	W 73–64	Boyette (16)	Boyette (12)	Vandersloot (6)	Bankers Life Fieldhouse; 7,533	5–4
10	June 12; 5:00 PM	@ Phoenix	L 80–86	Delle Donne (18)	de Souza (7)	de Souza, Faulkner (3)	Talking Stick Resort Arena; 9,055	5–5
11	June 14; 9:30 PM	@ Los Angeles	L 85–98	Pondexter (20)	de Souza (12)	Pondexter (5)	Staples Center; 7,348	5–6
12	June 17; 6:30 PM	@ Atlanta	L 97–101 OT	Delle Donne (26)	de Souza (8)	Vandersloot, Pondexter, Faulkner (5)	Philips Arena; 4,560	5–7
13	June 21; 7:00 PM	San Antonio	W 81–75	Delle Donne (23)	Young (9)	Faulkner, Young, Delle Donne (3)	Allstate Arena; 5,744	6–7
14	June 24; 6:30 PM	@ New York	L79–80	Delle Donne (31)	Delle Donne (8)	Vandersloot (5)	Madison Square Garden; 10,120	6–8
15	June 29; 11:30 AM	Indiana	L 83–95	Delle Donne (21)	Delle Donne (6)	Pondexter (6)	Allstate Arena; 11,892	6–9

July: 5–4 (Home: 3–3; Road: 2–1)

Game	Date	Team	Score	High points	High rebounds	High assists	Location Attendance	Record
16	July 1; 6:00 PM	Washington	W 86–84 OT	Delle Donne (28)	Delle Donne (11)	Vandersloot (5)	Allstate Arena; 5,320	7–9
17	July 5; 7:30 PM	@ Washington	L 82–87	Delle Donne (38)	Delle Donne (10)	Faulkner (7)	Target Center; 7,433	7–10
18	July 8; 7:30 PM	New York	L 85–88	Quigley (29)	Delle Donne (7)	Faulkner (5)	Allstate Arena; 5,633	7–11
19	July 10; 6:00 PM	Phoenix	W 100–95	Quigley (21)	Boyette (13)	Vandersloot, Faulkner (7)	Allstate Arena; 7,021	8–11
20	July 13; 5:00 PM	Los Angeles	L 67–77	Delle Donne (15)	Boyette (7)	Vandersloot, Faulkner (5)	Allstate Arena; 16,444	8–12
21	July 14; 9:30 PM	Los Angeles	W 84–77	Delle Donne (24)	Boyette (8)	Faulkner (6)	Allstate Arena; 6,012	9–12
22	July 17; 6:30 PM	@ Seattle	W 91–88	Delle Donne (35)	Delle Donne (11)	Faulkner (4)	KeyArena	10–12
23	July 19; 7:00 PM	@ Phoenix	L 77–79	Delle Donne (18)	Boyette (10)	Vandersloot (3)	Talking Stick Resort Arena; 9,318	11–12
24	July 22; 6:30 PM	Connecticut	L 89–94	Delle Donne (20)	Breland (8)	Vandersloot (6)	Allstate Arena; 6,893	11–13

August: 2–0 (Home: 1–0; Road: 1–0)

Game	Date	Team	Score	High points	High rebounds	High assists	Location Attendance	Record
25	August 26; 11:30 AM	Atlanta	W 90–82	Delle Donne (34)	Boyette (9)	Delle Donne, Pondexter (5)	Allstate Arena; 6,016	12–13
26	August 28; 11:30 AM	@ Dallas	W 92–85	Delle Donne (18)	Delle Donne (9)	Vandersloot (9)	College Park Center; 5,651	13–13

September: 5–3 (Home: 4–0; Road: 1–3)

Game	Date	Team	Score	High points	High rebounds	High assists	Location Attendance	Record
27	September 2; 11:30 AM	Seattle	W 92–88	Young (24)	Breland (10)	Vandersloot, Pondexter (5)	Allstate Arena; 5,997	14–13
28	September 4; 11:30 AM	San Antonio	W 97–73	Delle Donne (35)	Boyette (7)	Vandersloot, Pondexter 5	Allstate Arena; 6,034	15–13
29	September 7; 6:00 PM	@ Washington	L 81–118	Vandersloot (17)	Boyette (7)	Vandersloot (8)	Verizon Center; 5,373	15–14
30	September 9; 5:00 PM	@ Los Angeles	L 88–95	Pondexter (22)	Breland (9)	Vandersloot (4)	Bankers Life Fieldhouse; 10,533	15–15
31	September 11; 9:30 PM	@ Los Angeles	W 96–86	Pondexter (24)	Breland (10)	Pondexter (5)	Mohegan Sun Arena; 6,620	16–15
32	September 13; 6:30 PM	Minnesota	W 98–97 OT	Pondexter (24)	de Souza (11)	Pondexter (4)	Allstate Arena; 6,050	17–15
33	September 16; 7:00 PM	New York	W 92–68	Young (22)	Young (9)	Faulkner (11)	Allstate Arena; 7,925	18–15
34	September 18; 6:30 PM	@ Seattle	L 75–88	Faulkner, Breland (14)	Boyette, de Souza (6)	Faulkner (7)	KeyArena; 12,186	18–16

2016 season schedule

=== Playoffs ===
2016 playoff game log
Second Round vs. Atlanta Dream
Won Series: 1–0

Game	Date	Team	Score	High points	High rebounds	High assists	Location Attendance	Series
1	September 25	Atlanta	W 108–98	Vandersloot (21)	Breland (16)	Vandersloot (13)	Allstate Arena; 3,922	1–0

Semifinals vs. Los Angeles Sparks
Lost Series: 1–3

Game	Date	Team	Score	High points	High rebounds	High assists	Location Attendance	Series
1	September 28	@ Los Angeles	L 75–95	Faulkner (13)	Breland (7)	Vandersloot (5)	Walter Pyramid; 3,894	0–1
2	September 30	@ Los Angeles	L 84–99	dos Santos (15)	Breland (9)	Quigley (5)	Staples Center; 7,855	0–2
3	October 2	Los Angeles	W 70–66	Vandersloot (17)	McGee-Stafford (11)	Faulkner, Vandersloot (5)	Allstate Arena; 5,018	1–2
4	October 4	Los Angeles	L 75–95	Pondexter (19)	McGee-Stafford (10)	Young (6)	Allstate Arena; 3,841	1–3

2016 playoff schedule

=== Standings ===
Eastern Conference	W	L	PCT	GB	Home	Road	Conf.
3 - New York Liberty	21	13	.618	—	10–7	11–6	11–5
4 - Chicago Sky	18	16	.529	3	11–6	7–10	8–8
5 - Indiana Fever	17	17	.500	4	8–9	9–8	8–8
6 - Atlanta Dream	17	17	.500	4	11–6	6–11	9–7
e - Connecticut Sun	14	20	.412	7	8–9	6–11	4–12
e - Washington Mystics	13	21	.382	8	5–12	8–9	8–8

Notes

# – Playoff seed
e – Eliminated from playoffs

== Playoffs ==
The Sky's 18–16 regular season record was good for second in the Eastern Conference and fourth overall in the WNBA. This standing led to Chicago being seeded fourth and being granted an automatic bye from the first of two single elimination rounds. In the second single elimination round, the Sky drew sixth-seeded Atlanta, defeating the Dream 108–98 and advancing to the best-of-five semifinal round. The Sky fell to second-seeded Los Angeles in the semifinals, losing in four games.

**First round** Single elimination (Sept. 21)
5	Indiana Fever	78
8	**Phoenix Mercury**	**89**
6	**Atlanta Dream**	**94**
7	Seattle Storm	85

**Second round** Single elimination (Sept. 24 and 25)
3	New York Liberty	94
8	**Phoenix Mercury**	**101**
4	**Chicago Sky**	**108**
6	Atlanta Dream	98

**Semifinals**; Best-of-5 (Sept. 28 – Oct. 6)
1	**Minnesota Lynx**	**3**
8	Phoenix Mercury	0
2	**Los Angeles Sparks**	**3**
4	Chicago Sky	1

**WNBA Finals**; Best-of-5 (Oct. 9 – 20)
1	Minnesota Lynx	2
2	**Los Angeles Sparks**	**3**

Note: Teams re-seeded after the second round and semifinals.

- **Bold** – Game or series winner
- Italic – Team with home-court advantage

== Statistics ==
Legend
GP	Games played	GS	Games started	MPG	Minutes per game	RPG	Rebounds per game
APG	Assists per game	SPG	Steals per game	BPG	Blocks per game	PPG	Points per game
FG%	Field-goal percentage	3P%	3-point field-goal percentage	FT%	Free-throw percentage	TO	Turnovers per game
PF	Fouls per game		Team leader		League leader

=== Regular season ===
Player	GP	GS	MPG	FG%	3P%	FT%	RPG	APG	SPG	BPG	PPG
Elena Delle Donne	28	28	33.1	48.5%	42.6%	93.5%	7.0	1.9	0.6	1.5	21.5
Cappie Pondexter	33	29	27.4	42.9%	36.2%	88.2%	2.8	2.7	0.9	0.1	12.9
Tamera Young	32	20	25.8	45.0%	0.0%	79.0%	4.5	1.4	0.8	0.1	8.5
Courtney Vandersloot	30	21	24.3	41.9%	35.1%	90.4%	2.7	4.7	1.4	0.1	9.5
Jamierra Faulkner	34	14	19.3	42.5%	33.3%	76.9%	1.5	4.6	1.1	0.1	7.8
Imani McGee-Stafford	31	16	18.9	55.4%	—	66.0%	5.6	0.6	0.6	1.4	6.7
Allie Quigley	34	0	17.8	47.1%	36.6%	89.5%	0.9	1.6	0.5	0.1	9.5
Jessica Breland	34	16	17.2	49.4%	—	79.5%	4.4	0.7	0.5	1.1	6.0
Érika de Souza	31	18	16.6	51.7%	—	75.0%	5.2	0.6	0.5	0.7	5.8
Cheyenne Parker	25	7	12.6	50.6%	0.0%	53.1%	3.2	0.2	0.5	0.2	4.0
Clarissa dos Santos	20	0	9.4	33.9%	0.0%	85.0%	2.2	0.5	0.3	0.2	2.9
Betnijah Laney	8	1	5.3	16.7%	0.0%	100%	0.6	0.1	0.1	0.0	1.0

== Awards and honors ==
Recipient	Award	Date awarded
Elena Delle Donne	Eastern Conference Player of the Week	July 18, 2016
Elena Delle Donne	Eastern Conference Player of the Week	September 6, 2016
Imani McGee-Stafford	WNBA All-Rookie Team	September 2016
Elena Delle Donne	WNBA All-WNBA First Team	September 2016
