= 2016 San Antonio Stars season =

- Head coach: Dan Hughes
- Arena: AT&T Center

Results
- Record: 7–27 (.206)
- Place: 6th (Western)
- Playoff finish: Did not qualify

The 2016 WNBA season was the 20th season for the San Antonio Stars franchise of the WNBA. The season tipped-off at home against the Atlanta Dream on May 14, 2016. The season was their fourteenth for the franchise in San Antonio.

The Stars' season got off to a rocky start as they lost their first three games of the season. However, none of the losses were by more than double-digits and they went on to win their first game of the season on May 27 against the Chicago Sky, 79–78. They followed their 1–3 May record with a 2–9 record in June. They lost their first four games of the month, before defeating Seattle 77–70. They would lose another four games before defeating Atlanta 73–69 for their third win of the season. The stretch of losses did include an overtime loss to Dallas. July started off with the team's best stretch of the season as they won two of their first three games in the month. They defeated Indiana, in overtime, and Washington while losing at Minnesota. The Stars could not sustain the momentum as they lost their next five games in a row to head into the Olympic break. They posted a 2–6 record in July. They lost the first game back from the break, but defeated Washington in the second game. A loss at Connecticut saw them finish August 1–2. The Stars lost five games in a row to open September. The six-game losing streak was broken on September 13 in Atlanta with a four-point win. However, the team would lose their final two games to finish September 1–7. They finished with an overall record of 7–27, which tied the 2005 season for the worst record in franchise history.

== Transactions ==
=== WNBA draft ===
Round	Pick	Player	Nationality	School/Team/Country
1	2	Moriah Jefferson	United States	Connecticut
2	14	Jazmon Gwathmey	United States	James Madison
3	25	Brittney Martin	United States	Oklahoma State

=== Trades and Roster Changes ===
Date	Transaction
April 14	The Stars acquired Jia Perkins in exchange for the rights to Jazmon Gwathmey
April 25	Waived Kayla Thornton
April 29	Waived Danielle Adams and Brittney Martin
May 6	The Stars acquired the thirteenth pick in the 2017 WNBA draft in exchange for Monique Currie
May 6	Waived Shamela Hampton
May 10	Waived Vicky McIntyre, Zahna Medley, and Kelsey Minato
May 12	Waived Samantha Logic and Tabatha Richardson-Smith
June 16	Waived Frida Eldebrink

== Roster ==
2016 San Antonio Stars roster
Players
Coaches

Pos.	No.	Nat.	Name	Height	Weight	DOB	From	Yrs
C	40	(Canada)	Alexander, Kayla (injured)	6' 4" (1.93m)	195 lb (88kg)	1991-01-05	Syracuse	3
C	32	(United States)	Appel, Jayne	6' 4" (1.93m)	210 lb (95kg)	1988-05-14	Stanford	6
F/C	22	(United States)	Baugh, Vicki	6' 4" (1.93m)	190 lb (86kg)	1989-05-21	Tennessee	2
G	51	(United States)	Colson, Sydney	5' 8" (1.73m)	140 lb (64kg)	1989-08-06	Texas A&M	2
F	1	(United States)	Currie, Monique	6' 0" (1.83m)	175 lb (79kg)	1983-02-25	Duke	10
G	24	(United States)	Gwathmey, Jazmon	6' 2" (1.88m)	158 lb (72kg)	1993-01-24	James Madison	R
F	5	(United States)	Hamby, Dearica	6' 3" (1.91m)	189 lb (86kg)	1993-11-06	Wake Forest	1
G	4	(United States)	Jefferson, Moriah	5' 6" (1.68m)	130 lb (59kg)	1994-03-08	Connecticut	R
G	14	(United States)	Knight, Whitney	6' 3" (1.91m)	156 lb (71kg)	1993-01-09	Florida Gulf Coast	R
G	21	(United States)	McBride, Kayla (injured)	5' 11" (1.8m)	179 lb (81kg)	1992-06-25	Notre Dame	2
G/F	6	(United States)	Montgomery, Alex	6' 1" (1.85m)	185 lb (84kg)	1988-11-12	Georgia Tech	5
F/C	45	(Spain)	Ndour-Fall, Astou	6' 5" (1.96m)	173 lb (78kg)	1994-08-22		1
F	7	(United States)	Peters, Haley	6' 3" (1.91m)	178 lb (81kg)	1992-09-17	Duke	R

Head coach
(United States) Dan Hughes (Muskingum)
Assistant coaches
(United States) Vickie Johnson (Louisiana Tech)
(United States) James Wade (Kennesaw State)
Athletic trainer
(United States) Tonya Holley (St. Andrews Presbyterian)
Strength and conditioning coach
(United States) Chrissy Stragisher (Muskingum)

Legend

- (C) Team captain
- (DP) Unsigned draft pick
- (FA) Free agent
- (S) Suspended
- Injured

== Schedule ==
=== Preseason ===
2016 pre-season game log
May: 1–2 (Home: 0–1; Road: 1–1)

Game	Date	Team	Score	High points	High rebounds	High assists	Location Attendance	Record
1	May 4	vs. Atlanta	W 74–67	Dearica Hamby (18)	Jayne Appel (11)	Moriah Jefferson (6)	Mohegan Sun Arena; 4,199	1–0
2	May 5	@ Connecticut	L 53–76	Colson, Montgomery (8)	Hampton, Ndour-Fall (5)	Sydney Colson (3)	Mohegan Sun Arena; 4,025	1–1
3	May 9	Los Angeles	L 70–77	Haley Peters (20)	Kayla Alexander (9)	Colson, Logic (4)	AT&T Center; 2,307	1–2

2016 pre-season schedule

=== Regular season ===
2016 game log
Total: 7–27 (Home: 4–13 Road: 3–14)
May: 1–3 (Home: 1–2; Road: 0–1)

Game	Date	Team	Score	High points	High rebounds	High assists	Location Attendance	Record
1	May 14	Atlanta	L 63–73	Kayla McBride (24)	Appel, Hamby (9)	Currie, Jefferson (6)	AT&T Center; 7,572	0–1
2	May 19	Connecticut	L 68–72	Dearica Hamby (16)	Dearica Hamby (9)	Moriah Jefferson (7)	AT&T Center; 6,267	0–2
3	May 21	@ Dallas	L 77–82	Kayla McBride (29)	Appel, Currie (7)	Currie, McBride (4)	College Park Center; 7,275	0–3
4	May 27	Chicago	W 79–78	Haley Peters (16)	Monique Currie (5)	Appel, Colson, Hamby (3)	AT&T Center; 5,210	1–3

June: 2–9 (Home: 2–3; Road: 0–6)

Game	Date	Team	Score	High points	High rebounds	High assists	Location Attendance	Record
5	June 2	@ Los Angeles	L 61–68	Kayla McBride (20)	Kayla Alexander (10)	Dearica Hamby (4)	Staples Center; 8,341	1–4
6	June 4	Los Angeles	L 61–74	Moriah Jefferson (18)	Kayla McBride (6)	Colson, Jefferson (3)	AT&T Center; 5,403	1–5
7	June 9	@ Phoenix	L 75–90	Monique Currie (19)	Monique Currie (8)	Moriah Jefferson (7)	Talking Stick Resort Arena; 9,048	1–6
8	June 11	New York	L 75–90	Astou Ndour-Fall (18)	Astou Ndour-Fall (9)	Moriah Jefferson (7)	AT&T Center; 5,219	1–7
9	June 14	Seattle	W 77–70	Moriah Jefferson (19)	Dearica Hamby (18)	Currie, Jefferson (3)	AT&T Center; 3,319	2–7
10	June 17	Indiana	L 75–84	Kayla McBride (21)	Jayne Appel (7)	Jayne Appel (6)	AT&T Center; 6,107	2–8
11	June 19	@ Connecticut	L 90–93	Kayla McBride (25)	Monique Currie (6)	Moriah Jefferson (6)	Mohegan Sun Arena; 5,596	2–9
12	June 21	@ Chicago	L 75–81	Moriah Jefferson (20)	Kayla McBride (10)	Moriah Jefferson (4)	Allstate Arena; 5,744	2–10
13	June 23	@ Dallas	L 90–97 (OT)	Hamby, McBride (18)	Kayla McBride (9)	Moriah Jefferson (5)	College Park Center; 4,027	2–11
14	June 25	Atlanta	W 73–69	Kayla McBride (28)	Kayla Alexander (10)	Moriah Jefferson (7)	AT&T Center; 9,439	3–11
15	June 29	@ Washington	L 67–84	Kayla Alexander (12)	Kayla Alexander (6)	Sydney Colson (4)	Capital One Arena; 6,314	3–12

July: 2–6 (Home: 1–2; Road: 1–4)

Game	Date	Team	Score	High points	High rebounds	High assists	Location Attendance	Record
16	July 1	@ Indiana	W 87–85 (OT)	Moriah Jefferson (31)	Jayne Appel (8)	Sydney Colson (4)	Bankers Life Fieldhouse; 7,519	4–12
17	July 2	@ Minnesota	L 68–91	Kayla Alexander (11)	Alex Montgomery (6)	Colson, Montgomery (3)	Target Center; 7,534	4–13
18	July 6	Washington	W 77–70	Monique Currie (20)	Jayne Appel (12)	Moriah Jefferson (5)	AT&T Center; 3,701	5–13
19	July 8	Seattle	L 68–78	Moriah Jefferson (16)	Dearica Hamby (7)	Moriah Jefferson (6)	AT&T Center; 8,955	5–14
20	July 10	@ New York	L 65–75	Monique Currie (17)	Dearica Hamby (9)	Sydney Colson (3)	Madison Square Garden; 9,790	5–15
21	July 12	Minnesota	L 57–81	Moriah Jefferson (14)	Dearica Hamby (5)	Hamby, Jefferson (2)	AT&T Center; 11,171	5–16
22	July 16	@ Phoenix	L 64–83	Moriah Jefferson (14)	Alex Montgomery (5)	Jefferson, Montgomery (4)	Talking Stick Resort Arena; 11,539	5–17
23	July 20	@ Seattle	L 69–83	Moriah Jefferson (25)	Alexander, Appel, Jefferson, Montgomery (5)	Alex Montgomery (6)	KeyArena; 9,686	5–18

August: 1–2 (Home: 0–1; Road: 1–1)

Game	Date	Team	Score	High points	High rebounds	High assists	Location Attendance	Record
24	August 26	New York	L 77–84	Jayne Appel (17)	Jayne Appel (8)	Moriah Jefferson (4)	AT&T Center; 6,831	5–19
25	August 28	@ Washington	W 85–74	Currie, Gwathmey, Ndour-Fall (16)	Monique Currie (10)	Moriah Jefferson (9)	Capital One Arena; 5,509	6–19
26	August 30	@ Connecticut	L 62–89	Astou Ndour-Fall (12)	Astou Ndour-Fall (5)	Sydney Colson (5)	Mohegan Sun Arena; 5,291	6–20

September: 1–7 (Home: 0–5; Road: 1–2)

Game	Date	Team	Score	High points	High rebounds	High assists	Location Attendance	Record
27	September 1	Los Angeles	L 61–70	Jayne Appel (12)	Jayne Appel (9)	Colson, Jefferson (4)	AT&T Center; 3,992	6–21
28	September 4	@ Chicago	L 73–97	Monique Currie (20)	Appel, Baugh (6)	Jayne Appel (4)	Allstate Arena; 6,034	6–22
29	September 6	Indiana	L 69–71	Moriah Jefferson (17)	Astou Ndour-Fall (8)	Sydney Colson (5)	AT&T Center; 5,838	6–23
30	September 9	Dallas	L 84–92	Moriah Jefferson (27)	Appel, Currie (7)	Monique Currie (6)	AT&T Center; 7,425	6–24
31	September 11	Minnesota	L 76–81	Moriah Jefferson (26)	Astou Ndour-Fall (8)	Jayne Appel (7)	AT&T Center; 5,705	6–25
32	September 13	@ Atlanta	W 71–67	Astou Ndour-Fall (20)	Jayne Appel (14)	Colson, Currie, Jefferson (4)	Philips Arena; 5,312	7–25
33	September 16	@ Los Angeles	L 65–71	Moriah Jefferson (18)	Monique Currie (7)	Currie, Jefferson (4)	Staples Center; 13,519	7–26
34	September 18	Phoenix	L 65–81	Monique Currie (19)	Jayne Appel (9)	Moriah Jefferson (6)	AT&T Center; 6,397	7–27

2016 season schedule

== Standings ==
Western Conference	W	L	PCT	GB	Home	Road	Conf.
1 - Minnesota Lynx	28	6	.824	—	15–2	13–4	15–1
2 - Los Angeles Sparks	26	8	.765	2	14–3	12–5	11–5
7 - Seattle Storm	16	18	.471	12	10–7	6–11	7–9
8 - Phoenix Mercury	16	18	.471	12	11–6	5–12	6–10
e - Dallas Wings	11	23	.324	17	6–11	5–12	8–8
e - San Antonio Stars	7	27	.206	21	4–13	3–14	1–15

Notes

# – Playoff seed
e – Eliminated from playoffs

== Statistics ==
Legend
GP	Games played	GS	Games started	MPG	Minutes per game	RPG	Rebounds per game
APG	Assists per game	SPG	Steals per game	BPG	Blocks per game	PPG	Points per game
FG%	Field-goal percentage	3P%	3-point field-goal percentage	FT%	Free-throw percentage	TO	Turnovers per game
PF	Fouls per game		Team leader		League leader

=== Regular season ===
Player	GP	GS	MPG	FG%	3P%	FT%	RPG	APG	SPG	BPG	PPG
Kayla McBride	17	17	30.8	36.7%	30.5%	85.3%	4.0	1.9	1.1	0.1	17.1
Moriah Jefferson	34	34	30.4	42.6%	37.5%	77.5%	2.1	4.2	1.6	0.1	13.9
Monique Currie	34	34	25.5	38.6%	32.1%	91.8%	4.4	2.1	0.8	0.4	10.7
Dearica Hamby	25	25	25.3	42.2%	14.3%	72.3%	5.1	1.0	0.5	0.5	9.0
Kayla Alexander	25	0	19.6	54.6%	—	75.4%	4.5	0.5	0.4	0.5	8.0
Astou Ndour-Fall	30	9	14.9	39.6%	34.4%	82.9%	3.2	0.4	0.4	0.9	6.0
Haley Peters	34	0	17.5	34.9%	25.0%	75.7%	2.3	0.8	0.4	0.2	5.8
Sydney Colson	34	0	16.9	43.1%	19.2%	83.1%	1.6	2.6	1.1	0.0	5.1
Jayne Appel	34	34	23.1	42.9%	0.0%	73.5%	5.4	2.1	0.9	1.0	4.1
Vicki Baugh	11	0	13.5	57.6%	—	66.7%	3.7	0.3	0.4	0.3	4.0
Alex Montgomery	25	7	14.3	35.7%	31.3%	75.0%	2.1	1.6	0.4	0.2	3.6
Jazmon Gwathmey	22	10	16.0	34.6%	33.3%	76.9%	1.7	0.7	0.4	0.4	3.3
Blake Dietrick	1	0	8.0	50.0%	0.0%	—	3.0	0.0	0.0	0.0	2.0
Frida Eldebrink	8	0	5.5	12.5%	0.0%	50.0%	0.4	0.9	0.1	0.0	0.4
Avery Warley-Talbert	2	0	5.5	0.0%	—	—	1.0	0.5	0.0	0.5	0.0
Whitney Knight	3	0	3.7	0.0%	0.0%	—	0.7	0.3	0.0	0.0	0.0

== Awards and honors ==
Recipient	Award	Date awarded	Ref.
Jayne Appel	WNBA Community Assist Award - August	August 2016	
Moriah Jefferson	WNBA All-Rookie Team	September 29, 2016	
