= 2016 Washington Mystics season =

- Head coach: Mike Thibault
- Arena: Verizon Center

Results
- Record: 13–21 (.382)
- Place: 6th (Eastern)
- Playoff finish: Did Not Qualify

The 2016 WNBA season was the 19th season for the Washington Mystics of the Women's National Basketball Association. The season began at home versus the Washington Mystics on May 14, 2016. The Mystics would go on to lose their opening game 76–87. Their losing streak extended to three games before the Mystics got their first win of the season on May 21, 2016, 84–76, over the Connecticut Sun. They continued their winning ways with a 84–82 overtime victory in Seattle. They lost their final game of the season to finish May 2–4. The Mystics then lost back-to-back games against the Chicago Sky to open June. Their fortunes improved after that as they went 5–1 in their next six games. Their only loss came against the Minnesota Lynx. They won a triple overtime game against Connecticut over that stretch, and also defeated Atlanta twice. The streak was broken with a 91–79 loss to Phoenix. The Mystics won their next two games to close out June with a 7–4 record. The two game winning streak was not extended as they opened July with an overtime loss in Chicago. Their season took a turn for the worse from there as they lost their next six straight games. They lost to San Antonio, New York, and Phoenix by single digits, but lose their other three games by double digits. The worst loss of the stretch was a twenty-nine point loss at Seattle. The Mystics went into the Olympic break with a 9–15 overall record. They played two games in August after the Olympic break where they defeated Indiana and lost to San Antonio. They won two out of their first three games in September, defeating Dallas and Chicago. They had an outside chance of qualifying for the playoffs, but ended September on a 1–4 stretch. Their only win came against New York while they lost to Seattle, Indiana, Atlanta, and Connecticut.

The Mystics finished the season 13–21 and only mustered four wins after June 29. They finished sixth in the Eastern Conference and did not qualify for the playoffs. Their thirteen wins were their worst since the 2012 season.

== Transactions ==
=== WNBA draft ===
Round	Pick	Player	Nationality	School/Team/Country
1	7	Kahleah Copper	United States	Rutgers
2	19	Lia Galdeira	United States	Washington State
3	31	Danaejah Grant	United States	St. John's

=== Trades/Roster Changes ===
Date	Details
February 3, 2016	Signed F LaToya Sanders
March 8, 2016	Extended Emma Meesseman

== Roster ==
Source:Source:

2016 Washington Mystics roster
Players
Coaches

Pos.	No.	Nat.	Name	Height	Weight	DOB	From	Yrs
G	15	(United States)	Cloud, Natasha	5' 10" (1.78m)	160 lb (73kg)	1992-02-22	Saint Joseph's	1
G/F	2	(United States)	Copper, Kahleah	6' 1" (1.85m)	155 lb (70kg)	1994-08-28	Rutgers	R
C	31	(United States)	Dolson, Stefanie	6' 5" (1.96m)	235 lb (107kg)	1992-01-08	Connecticut	2
G	4	(United States)	Hill, Tayler	5' 9" (1.75m)	145 lb (66kg)	1990-10-23	Ohio State	3
G	12	(United States)	Latta, Ivory (injured)	5' 6" (1.68m)	138 lb (63kg)	1984-09-25	North Carolina	9
F	11	(United States)	Malott, Ally	6' 4" (1.93m)	183 lb (83kg)	1992-10-31	Dayton	1
C	33	(Belgium)	Meesseman, Emma	6' 4" (1.93m)	191 lb (87kg)	1993-05-13	Belgium	3
G	5	(United States)	Mitchell, Leilani	5' 5" (1.65m)	138 lb (63kg)	1985-06-15	Utah	7
F/C	30	(United States)	Sanders, LaToya (injured)	6' 2" (1.88m)	170 lb (77kg)	1986-09-11	North Carolina	4
G	14	(United States)	Ruffin-Pratt, Tierra	5' 11" (1.8m)	180 lb (82kg)	1991-04-11	North Carolina	3
C	9	(United States)	Vaughn, Kia	6' 4" (1.93m)	205 lb (93kg)	1987-01-24	Rutgers	7

Head coach
(United States) Mike Thibault (Saint Martin's)
Assistant coaches
(United States) Marianne Stanley (Immaculata)
(United States) Eric Thibault (Missouri)
Athletic trainer
(United States) Emily Fortunato (George Washington)
Strength and conditioning coach
(United States) Stu Singer

Legend

- (C) Team captain
- (DP) Unsigned draft pick
- (FA) Free agent
- (S) Suspended
- Injured

== Game log ==
=== Preseason ===
2016 pre-season game log
May: 1–1 (Home: 0–1; Road: 1–0)

Game	Date	Team	Score	High points	High rebounds	High assists	Location Attendance	Record
1	May 6	Indiana	L 69–89	Kahleah Copper (13)	Copper, Dolson, Vaughn (6)	Cloud, Vaughn (3)	Capital One Arena; 2,072	0–1
2	May 8	@ Minnesota	W 85–68	Tayler Hill (18)	Zoi Dimitrakou (5)	Tierra Ruffin-Pratt (5)	Mayo Civic Center; 4,524	1–1

2016 pre-season schedule

=== Regular season ===
2016 game log
Total: 13–21 (Home: 5–12; Road: 8–9)
May: 2–4 (Home: 0–3; Road: 2–1)

Game	Date	Team	Score	High points	High rebounds	High assists	Location Attendance	Record
1	May 14	New York	L 76–87	Tayler Hill (20)	Tayler Hill (8)	Natasha Cloud (4)	Capital One Arena; 11,579	0–1
2	May 18	Dallas	L 77–87	Tayler Hill (20)	Cloud, Meesseman (7)	Bria Hartley (5)	Capital One Arena; 5,618	0–2
3	May 20	Los Angeles	L 67–97	Emma Meesseman (13)	Emma Meesseman (11)	Bria Hartley (7)	Capital One Arena; 7,807	0–3
4	May 21	@ Connecticut	W 84–76	Tayler Hill (24)	Bria Hartley (6)	Tayler Hill (7)	Mohegan Sun Arena; 6,022	1–3
5	May 26	@ Seattle	W 84–82 (OT)	Emma Meesseman (19)	Emma Meesseman (13)	Tierra Ruffin-Pratt (6)	KeyArena; 5,239	2–3
6	May 29	@ Phoenix	L 77–93	Stefanie Dolson (14)	Dolson, Hill (6)	Natasha Cloud (3)	Talking Stick Resort Arena; 9,228	2–4

June : 7–4 (Home: 4–3; Road: 3–1)

Game	Date	Team	Score	High points	High rebounds	High assists	Location Attendance	Record
7	June 1	Chicago	L 78–86	Stefanie Dolson (14)	Kahleah Copper (7)	Tierra Ruffin-Pratt (6)	Capital One Arena; 5,649	2–5
8	June 3	@ Chicago	L 72–98	Emma Meesseman (13)	Emma Meesseman (5)	Natasha Cloud (4)	Allstate Arena; 5,489	2–6
9	June 5	@ Atlanta	W 86–79	Tayler Hill (17)	Stefanie Dolson (12)	Cloud, Dolson, Hill (3)	Philips Arena; 3,611	3–6
10	June 8	@ Dallas	W 87–79	Emma Meesseman (23)	Emma Meesseman (12)	Cloud, Latta, Ruffin-Pratt (3)	College Park Center; 4,177	4–6
11	June 11	Minnesota	L 76–83	Emma Meesseman (19)	Emma Meesseman (7)	Tayler Hill (6)	Capital One Arena; 7,751	4–7
12	June 14	@ Connecticut	W 109–106 (3OT)	Emma Meesseman (23)	Kia Vaughn (7)	Natasha Cloud (6)	Mohegan Sun Arena; 4,442	5–7
13	June 18	Atlanta	W 95–65	Tayler Hill (15)	Kia Vaughn (8)	Stefanie Dolson (4)	Capital One Arena; 6,977	6–7
14	June 22	Indiana	W 76–62	Tayler Hill (16)	Natasha Cloud (6)	Meesseman, Ruffin-Pratt (3)	Capital One Arena; 4,430	7–7
15	June 24	Phoenix	L 79–91	Cloud, Hill (18)	Stefanie Dolson (7)	Natasha Cloud (5)	Capital One Arena; 5,136	7–8
16	June 26	Minnesota	W 87–63	Emma Meesseman (20)	Stefanie Dolson (7)	Tayler Hill (5)	Capital One Arena; 6,322	8–8
17	June 29	San Antonio	W 84–67	Meesseman, Ruffin-Pratt (14)	Stefanie Dolson (7)	Tierra Ruffin-Pratt (5)	Capital One Arena; 6,314	9–8

July : 0–7 (Home: 0–2; Road: 0–5)

Game	Date	Team	Score	High points	High rebounds	High assists	Location Attendance	Record
18	July 1	@ Chicago	L 84–86 (OT)	Tayler Hill (25)	Tierra Ruffin-Pratt (8)	Emma Meesseman (5)	Allstate Arena; 5,320	9–9
19	July 6	@ San Antonio	L 70–77	Tayler Hill (14)	Stefanie Dolson (7)	Tierra Ruffin-Pratt (4)	AT&T Center; 3,701	9–10
20	July 10	@ Los Angeles	L 82–93	Emma Meesseman (24)	Emma Meesseman (7)	Emma Meesseman (6)	Staples Center; 19,076	9–11
21	July 13	@ Phoenix	L 74–78	Emma Meesseman (22)	Kahleah Copper (7)	Copper, Hartley, Hill, Latta, Ruffin-Pratt (3)	Talking Stick Resort Arena; 10,628	9–12
22	July 15	@ Seattle	L 51–80	Emma Meesseman (16)	Emma Meesseman (10)	Tayler Hill (5)	KeyArena; 9,686	9–13
23	July 20	New York	L 81–88	Emma Meesseman (20)	Dolson, Vaughn (6)	Cloud, Latta (6)	Capital One Arena; 12,778	9–14
24	July 22	Los Angeles	L 75–95	Emma Meesseman (16)	Kahleah Copper (5)	Latta, Ruffin-Pratt (4)	Capital One Arena; 5,455	9–15

August : 1–1 (Home: 0–1; Road: 1–0)

Game	Date	Team	Score	High points	High rebounds	High assists	Location Attendance	Record
25	August 27	@ Indiana	W 92–69	Tayler Hill (18)	Tierra Ruffin-Pratt (7)	Natasha Cloud (5)	Bankers Life Fieldhouse; 8,081	10–15
26	August 28	San Antonio	L 74–85	Tayler Hill (26)	Tierra Ruffin-Pratt (8)	Natasha Cloud (5)	Capital One Arena; 5,509	10–16

September : 3–5 (Home: 1–3; Road: 2–2)

Game	Date	Team	Score	High points	High rebounds	High assists	Location Attendance	Record
27	September 2	@ Minnesota	L 69–75	Tayler Hill (15)	Natasha Cloud (6)	Natasha Cloud (7)	Target Center; 7,523	10–17
28	September 4	@ Dallas	W 88–83	Tayler Hill (25)	Ruffin-Pratt, Vaughn (6)	Tierra Ruffin-Pratt (4)	College Park Center; 5,162	11–17
29	September 7	Chicago	W 118–81	Tayler Hill (21)	Emma Meesseman (8)	Natasha Cloud (7)	Capital One Arena; 5,373	12–17
30	September 9	Seattle	L 76–81	Emma Meesseman (15)	Stefanie Dolson (8)	Natasha Cloud (5)	Capital One Arena; 5,564	12–18
31	September 11	Indiana	L 73–80	Emma Meesseman (19)	Ruffin-Pratt, Vaughn (5)	Natasha Cloud (8)	Capital One Arena; 6,542	12–19
32	September 13	@ New York	W 75–62	Stefanie Dolson (23)	Dolson, Meesseman (7)	Cloud, Dolson (4)	Madison Square Garden; 8,345	13–19
33	September 15	@ Atlanta	L 91–94	Hill, Meesseman (20)	Emma Meesseman (10)	Natasha Cloud (7)	Philips Arena; 4,404	13–21
34	September 18	Connecticut	L 78–87	Dolson, Meesseman (18)	Kahleah Copper (7)	Meesseman, Ruffin-Pratt (4)	Capital One Arena; 8,991	13–21

2016 season schedule

== Standings ==
Eastern Conference	W	L	PCT	GB	Home	Road	Conf.
3 - New York Liberty	21	13	.618	—	10–7	11–6	11–5
4 - Chicago Sky	18	16	.529	3	11–6	7–10	8–8
5 - Indiana Fever	17	17	.500	4	8–9	9–8	8–8
6 - Atlanta Dream	17	17	.500	4	11–6	6–11	9–7
e - Connecticut Sun	14	20	.412	7	8–9	6–11	4–12
e - Washington Mystics	13	21	.382	8	5–12	8–9	8–8

== Statistics ==
Legend
GP	Games played	GS	Games started	MPG	Minutes per game	RPG	Rebounds per game
APG	Assists per game	SPG	Steals per game	BPG	Blocks per game	PPG	Points per game
FG%	Field-goal percentage	3P%	3-point field-goal percentage	FT%	Free-throw percentage	TO	Turnovers per game
PF	Fouls per game		Team leader		League leader

=== Regular season ===
Player	GP	GS	MPG	FG%	3P%	FT%	RPG	APG	SPG	BPG	PPG
Tayler Hill	32	32	29.3	34.8%	35.1%	82.9%	2.6	2.9	1.1	0.1	15.4
Emma Meesseman	34	34	29.3	53.3%	44.8%	80.0%	5.6	2.3	1.2	0.7	15.2
Tierra Ruffin-Pratt	32	31	24.4	36.9%	32.0%	74.7%	4.5	2.6	1.0	0.3	7.3
Natasha Cloud	31	28	24.3	34.8%	33.8%	75.4%	3.0	3.8	0.8	0.1	5.7
Stefanie Dolson	34	31	22.5	48.2%	30.0%	84.3%	4.7	1.1	0.4	0.9	9.3
Ivory Latta	22	2	20.8	33.1%	30.5%	90.9%	1.7	1.9	0.4	0.0	8.3
Kia Vaughn	34	4	19.8	50.3%	—	75.0%	4.3	0.6	0.6	0.5	6.3
LaToya Sanders	4	0	17.3	50.0%	—	84.6%	3.0	0.3	0.8	2.5	7.3
Bria Hartley	24	5	16.9	37.6%	36.2%	80.0%	2.0	2.3	0.4	—	6.5
Kahleah Copper	30	3	16.2	41.7%	46.7%	68.3%	3.1	0.8	0.5	0.1	6.2
Leilani Mitchell	10	0	16.1	43.5%	35.5%	80.0%	1.7	1.9	0.1	—	5.9
Tianna Hawkins	24	0	10.5	49.4%	50.0%	85.7%	2.5	0.4	0.2	0.2	4.7
Ally Malott	23	0	7.8	30.6%	31.3%	81.8%	1.1	0.4	0.3	0.1	2.1
Zoi Dimitrakou	2	0	5.5	33.3%	50.0%	—	0.5	0.5	—	—	1.5
Jamie Weisner	7	0	3.6	44.%	50.0%	100.0%	0.4	0.3	—	—	1.7

== Awards and honors ==
Recipient	Award	Date Awarded	Ref.
Emma Meesseman	Eastern Conference Player of the Week	June 13	
