= 2016 Seattle Storm season =

- Head coach: Jenny Boucek
- Arena: KeyArena

Results
- Record: 16–18 (.471)
- Place: T-3rd (Western)
- Playoff finish: Lost in First Round to Atlanta

The 2016 WNBA season was the 17th season for the Seattle Storm of the Women's National Basketball Association. The season began on May 15 on the road against Los Angeles. The Storm would lose that game 66–96, but would rebound in the very next game to defeat Phoenix 81–80. The team would then lose two of its next three, including an overtime loss to Washington to finish May 2–3. They began June with a stretch of games where they went 1–3, only defeating Phoenix over that stretch. In their next four games, they went 1–3 again, defeating only Indiana. They finished the month 2–1, defeating Connecticut and Atlanta before losing to Dallas. The Storm finished June 4–7. They lost their first two games in July before defeating San Antonio. They would finish the month 2–3, defeating Washington and San Antonio again. They went into the Olympic break 9–15 and out of the playoff picture. However, upon the return from the break, they went 2–1 in August, defeating Los Angeles and Dallas while losing to Minnesota. They began September with a road loss against Chicago before winning four straight games. This run included three road victories and a home victory over Los Angeles. A defeat against Phoenix in the penultimate game left their playoff status in the air. The Storm defeated Chicago 88–75 in the final game of the season to secure a playoff berth. They finished the regular season 16–18 and tied for third place in the Western Conference.

The Storm earned the seventh seed in the 2016 WNBA playoffs by virtue of a tiebreaker over the Phoenix Mercury, having won the season series 2–1. As the seventh seed, they traveled to sixth-seed Atlanta for the first round. The Storm won the regular season series between the teams 2–1, but this record did not carry over into the Playoffs. The Storm led 45–37 at halftime, but the Dream won the game 94–85 to end Seattle's season. First overall pick Breanna Stewart was a highlight of the season as she led the team in points and rebounds, won Rookie of the Year, and was selected to the All-WNBA Second Team. The Storm had two other players make all-WNBA teams, with Sue Bird being selected to the First Team, and Jewell Loyd also being selected to the Second Team.

== Transactions ==
=== WNBA draft ===
Round	Pick	Player	Nationality	School/Team/Country
1	1	Breanna Stewart	United States	Connecticut
3	26	Lexi Eaton Rydalch	United States	BYU

=== Trades/Roster Changes ===
Date	Details	Ref
February 2, 2016	Re-signed Alysha Clark	
February 2, 2016	Re-signed Jenna O'Hea	
February 9, 2016	Re-signed Crystal Langhorne	
February 12, 2016	Re-signed Ramu Tokashiki	
February 16, 2016	Re-signed Sue Bird	
June 25, 2016	The Storm acquired Noelle Quinn from the Phoenix Mercury in exchange for the rights to Angelica Robinson.	

== Roster ==
2016 Seattle Storm roster
Players
Coaches

Pos.	No.	Nat.	Name	Height	Weight	DOB	From	Yrs
G	10	(United States)	Bird, Sue	5' 9" (1.75m)	150 lb (68kg)	1980-10-16	Connecticut	14
F/C	5	(Australia)	Bishop, Abby	6' 3" (1.91m)	180 lb (82kg)	1988-11-29	Australia	2
F	32	(United States)	Clark, Alysha	5' 10" (1.78m)	167 lb (76kg)	1987-07-07	Middle Tennessee	5
F/C	1	(United States)	Langhorne, Crystal	6' 2" (1.88m)	185 lb (84kg)	1986-10-27	Maryland	9
G	24	(United States)	Loyd, Jewell	5' 10" (1.78m)	148 lb (67kg)	1993-10-05	Notre Dame	2
F	23	(United States)	Mosqueda-Lewis, Kaleena	5' 11" (1.8m)	180 lb (82kg)	1993-11-03	Connecticut	2
G	4	(Australia)	O'Hea, Jenna	6' 1" (1.85m)	174 lb (79kg)	1987-06-06	Australia	5
G	45	(United States)	Quinn, Noelle	6' 0" (1.83m)	178 lb (81kg)	1985-01-03	UCLA	10
F/C	30	(United States)	Stewart, Breanna	6' 4" (1.93m)	170 lb (77kg)	1994-08-27	Connecticut	R
C	34	(United States)	Thomas, Krystal	6' 5" (1.96m)	195 lb (88kg)	1989-06-10	Duke	5
F	7	(Japan)	Tokashiki, Ramu	6' 3" (1.91m)	176 lb (80kg)	1991-06-01	Japan	2
G/F	22	(United States)	Wright, Monica	5' 10" (1.78m)	182 lb (83kg)	1988-07-15	Virginia	6

Head coach
(United States) Jenny Boucek (Virginia)
Assistant coaches
(United States) Ryan Webb (Seattle)
(United States) Leah Drury (Alabama)
Athletic trainer
(United States) Tom Spencer (Central Washington)
Strength and conditioning coach
(United States) Blair Wagner (Wyoming)

Legend

- (C) Team captain
- (DP) Unsigned draft pick
- (FA) Free agent
- (S) Suspended
- Injured

== Game log ==
=== Preseason ===
2016 pre-season game log
May: 1–1 (Home: 0–1; Road: 1–0)

Game	Date	Team	Score	High points	High rebounds	High assists	Location Attendance	Record
1	May 4	Phoenix	L 73–81	Jewell Loyd (16)	Breanna Stewart (8)	Sue Bird (3)	KeyArena; 3,721	1–0
2	May 8	@ Phoenix	W 76–70	Alysha Clark (20)	Jewell Loyd (6)	Jewell Loyd (8)	Talking Stick Resort Arena; 4,074	1–1

2016 pre-season schedule

=== Regular season ===
2016 game log
Total: 16–18 (Home: 10–7; Road: 6–11)
May: 2–3 (Home: 1–2; Road: 1–1)

Game	Date	Team	Score	High points	High rebounds	High assists	Location Attendance	Record
1	May 15	@ Los Angeles	L 66–96	Breanna Stewart (23)	Breanna Stewart (6)	Jewell Loyd (5)	Staples Center; 10,591	0–1
2	May 20	@ Phoenix	W 81–80	Jewell Loyd (30)	Breanna Stewart (13)	Sue Bird (4)	Talking Stick Resort Arena; 13,048	1–1
3	May 22	Minnesota	L 71–78	Alysha Clark (20)	Breanna Stewart (13)	Sue Bird (9)	KeyArena; 9,686	1–2
4	May 26	Washington	L 82–84 (OT)	Breanna Stewart (25)	Breanna Stewart (7)	Sue Bird (5)	KeyArena; 5,239	1–3
5	May 28	Connecticut	W 93–81	Jewell Loyd (26)	Crystal Langhorne (8)	Bird, Loyd (5)	KeyArena; 4,456	2–3

June : 4–7 (Home: 3–3; Road: 1–4)

Game	Date	Team	Score	High points	High rebounds	High assists	Location Attendance	Record
6	June 1	@ Indiana	L 75–85	Breanna Stewart (22)	Breanna Stewart (8)	Sue Bird (6)	Bankers Life Fieldhouse; 6,721	2–4
7	June 3	Phoenix	W 95–81	Jewell Loyd (32)	Breanna Stewart (10)	Breanna Stewart (9)	KeyArena; 6,510	3–4
8	June 5	New York	L 78–86	Alysha Clark (23)	Breanna Stewart (17)	Sue Bird (10)	KeyArena; 6,240	3–5
9	June 10	@ Connecticut	L 76–77	Sue Bird (24)	Breanna Stewart (12)	Sue Bird (8)	Mohegan Sun Arena; 8,075	3–6
10	June 12	@ Indiana	W 90–88	Jewell Loyd (20)	Sue Bird (6)	Breanna Stewart (6)	Bankers Life Fieldhouse; 6,724	4–6
11	June 14	@ San Antonio	L 70–77	Breanna Stewart (19)	Breanna Stewart (15)	Sue Bird (4)	AT&T Center; 3,319	4–7
12	June 16	@ Dallas	L 79–88	Breanna Stewart (29)	Crystal Langhorne (7)	Sue Bird (6)	College Park Center; 4,622	4–8
13	June 19	Minnesota	L 84–96	Breanna Stewart (21)	Breanna Stewart (9)	Jewell Loyd (7)	KeyArena; 5,749	4–9
14	June 24	Connecticut	W 98–81	Breanna Stewart (29)	Breanna Stewart (9)	Sue Bird (7)	KeyArena; 6,568	5–9
15	June 28	Atlanta	W 84–81	Breanna Stewart (38)	Breanna Stewart (6)	Bird, Loyd (5)	KeyArena; 4,648	6–9
16	June 30	Dallas	L 78–83	Jewell Loyd (24)	Crystal Langhorne (9)	Breanna Stewart (6)	KeyArena; 5,365	6–10

July : 3–5 (Home: 2–2; Road: 1–3)

Game	Date	Team	Score	High points	High rebounds	High assists	Location Attendance	Record
17	July 5	@ Atlanta	L 64–77	Jewell Loyd (13)	Breanna Stewart (11)	Sue Bird (6)	Philips Arena; 3,983	6–11
18	July 6	@ New York	L 74–78	Breanna Stewart (24)	Breanna Stewart (16)	Sue Bird (10)	Madison Square Garden; 9,852	6–12
19	July 8	@ San Antonio	W 78–68	Breanna Stewart (21)	Crystal Langhorne (8)	Bird, Clark, Langhorne (5)	AT&T Center; 8,955	7–12
20	July 10	Indiana	L 82–93	Breanna Stewart (32)	Breanna Stewart (11)	Sue Bird (7)	KeyArena; 5,975	7–13
21	July 15	Washington	W 80–51	Jewell Loyd (26)	Breanna Stewart (7)	Breanna Stewart (8)	KeyArena; 9,686	8–13
22	July 17	Chicago	L 88–91	Sue Bird (24)	Breanna Stewart (8)	Jewell Loyd (10)	KeyArena; 5,318	8–14
23	July 20	San Antonio	W 83–69	Jewell Loyd (25)	Crystal Langhorne (10)	Sue Bird (8)	KeyArena; 9,686	9–14
24	July 22	@ Minnesota	L 72–79	Breanna Stewart (18)	Langhorne, Stewart (8)	Sue Bird (8)	Target Center; 12,124	9–15

August : 2–1 (Home: 2–0; Road: 0–1)

Game	Date	Team	Score	High points	High rebounds	High assists	Location Attendance	Record
25	August 26	Los Angeles	W 79–72	Crystal Langhorne (16)	Breanna Stewart (11)	Jewell Loyd (7)	KeyArena; 9,481	10–15
26	August 28	@ Minnesota	L 80–92	Jewell Loyd (20)	Langhorne, Stewart (6)	Bird, Loyd, Stewart (4)	Target Center; 11,834	10–16
27	August 31	Dallas	W 78–66	Jewell Loyd (23)	Breanna Stewart (12)	Bird, Langhorne, Loyd (4)	KeyArena; 6,771	11–16

September : 5–2 (Home: 2–0; Road: 3–2)

Game	Date	Team	Score	High points	High rebounds	High assists	Location Attendance	Record
28	September 2	@ Chicago	L 88–92	Jewell Loyd (23)	Loyd, Stewart (10)	Jewell Loyd (8)	Allstate Arena; 5,997	11–17
29	September 4	@ Atlanta	W 91–82	Bird, Stewart (23)	Breanna Stewart (8)	Alysha Clark (7)	Philips Arena; 5,695	12–17
30	September 7	@ New York	W 102–78	Jewell Loyd (25)	Langhorne, Stewart (9)	Sue Bird (8)	Madison Square Garden; 8,159	13–17
31	September 9	@ Washington	W 81–76	Bird, Stewart (17)	Breanna Stewart (10)	Sue Bird (9)	Capital One Arena; 5,564	14–17
32	September 11	Los Angeles	W 78–60	Breanna Stewart (20)	Crystal Langhorne (10)	Sue Bird (7)	KeyArena; 9,348	15–17
33	September 15	@ Phoenix	L 62–86	Breanna Stewart (14)	Breanna Stewart (9)	Clark, Loyd, Quinn (2)	Talking Stick Resort Arena; 10,380	15–18
34	September 18	Chicago	W 88–75	Breanna Stewart (18)	Breanna Stewart (11)	Jewell Loyd (6)	KeyArena; 12,186	16–18

2016 season schedule

=== Playoffs ===
2016 playoff game log
First Round
vs. Atlanta Dream

Game	Date	Team	Score	High points	High rebounds	High assists	Location Attendance	Series
1	September 21	@ Atlanta	L 85–94	Jewell Loyd (24)	Langhorne, Stewart (7)	Sue Bird (7)	McCamish Pavilion; 2,553	0–1

2016 playoff schedule

== Standings ==
Western Conference	W	L	PCT	GB	Home	Road	Conf.
**1** - Minnesota Lynx	28	6	.824	—	15–2	13–4	15–1
**2** - Los Angeles Sparks	26	8	.765	2	14–3	12–5	11–5
**7** - Seattle Storm	16	18	.471	12	10–7	6–11	7–9
**8** - Phoenix Mercury	16	18	.471	12	11–6	5–12	6–10
**e** - Dallas Wings	11	23	.324	17	6–11	5–12	8–8
**e** - San Antonio Stars	7	27	.206	21	4–13	3–14	1–15

=== Playoffs ===
**First round** Single elimination (Sept. 21)
5	Indiana Fever	78
8	**Phoenix Mercury**	**89**
6	**Atlanta Dream**	**94**
7	Seattle Storm	85

**Second round** Single elimination (Sept. 24 and 25)
3	New York Liberty	94
8	**Phoenix Mercury**	**101**
4	**Chicago Sky**	**108**
6	Atlanta Dream	98

**Semifinals**; Best-of-5 (Sept. 28 – Oct. 6)
1	**Minnesota Lynx**	**3**
8	Phoenix Mercury	0
2	**Los Angeles Sparks**	**3**
4	Chicago Sky	1

**WNBA Finals**; Best-of-5 (Oct. 9 – 20)
1	Minnesota Lynx	2
2	**Los Angeles Sparks**	**3**

Note: Teams re-seeded after the second round and semifinals.

- **Bold** – Game or series winner
- Italic – Team with home-court advantage

== Statistics ==
Legend
GP	Games played	GS	Games started	MPG	Minutes per game	RPG	Rebounds per game
APG	Assists per game	SPG	Steals per game	BPG	Blocks per game	PPG	Points per game
FG%	Field-goal percentage	3P%	3-point field-goal percentage	FT%	Free-throw percentage	TO	Turnovers per game
PF	Fouls per game		Team leader		League leader

=== Regular season ===
Player	GP	GS	MPG	FG%	3P%	FT%	RPG	APG	SPG	BPG	PPG
Breanna Stewart	34	34	34.7	45.7%	33.8%	83.3%	9.3	3.4	1.2	1.9	18.3
Sue Bird	34	34	31.6	44.9%	44.4%	78.6%	2.9	5.8	1.0	0.2	12.8
Jewell Loyd	34	34	31.6	43.1%	30.3%	89.1%	3.4	3.4	1.2	0.3	16.5
Alysha Clark	33	32	27.6	48.4%	38.7%	84.7%	3.7	1.9	0.7	0.1	9.0
Crystal Langhorne	33	33	25.5	63.0%	100.0%	75.9%	5.5	1.4	0.7	0.3	9.5
Noelle Quinn	20	0	13.9	28.8%	8.3%	100.0%	1.8	1.6	0.5	0.1	1.8
Ramu Tokashiki	31	1	13.0	47.2%	0.0%	81.8%	2.5	0.3	0.5	0.1	5.3
Kaleena Mosqueda-Lewis	32	0	12.3	39.1%	35.4%	77.8%	0.8	0.8	0.2	0.1	5.2
Jenna O'Hea	22	2	11.5	34.8%	31.6%	90.0%	1.3	0.9	0.4	0.1	3.0
Krystal Thomas	19	0	9.3	57.9%	—	71.4%	2.3	0.1	0.2	0.7	1.4
Monica Wright	16	0	6.1	30.8%	10.0%	60.0%	0.5	0.7	0.4	0.1	1.3
Markeisha Gatling	11	0	5.8	52.9%	—	100.0%	0.8	0.1	0.1	0.3	2.3
Abby Bishop	13	0	5.2	36.4%	16.7%	75.0%	0.5	0.6	0.1	0.1	0.9
Blake Dietrick	2	0	3.0	—	—	100.0%	—	—	—	—	1.0

== Awards and honors ==
Recipient	Award	Date Awarded	Ref.
Breanna Stewart	Rookie of the Year	September 29, 2016	
Breanna Stewart	All-WNBA Second Team	October 14, 2016	
Breanna Stewart	All-Rookie Team	September 29, 2016	
Breanna Stewart	Rookie of the Month	June 2, 2016	
Breanna Stewart	Rookie of the Month	July 7, 2016	
Breanna Stewart	Rookie of the Month	July 26, 2016	
Breanna Stewart	Rookie of the Month	September 20, 2016	
Breanna Stewart	Western Conference Player of the Week	September 12, 2016	
Sue Bird	Peak Performer: Assists	September 20, 2016	
Sue Bird	All-WNBA First Team	October 14, 2016	
Jewell Loyd	All-WNBA Second Team	October 14, 2016	
