= 2016 Connecticut Sun season =

- Head coach: Curt Miller
- Arena: Mohegan Sun Arena

Results
- Record: 14–20 (.412)
- Place: 5th (Eastern)
- Playoff finish: Did Not Qualify

The 2016 WNBA season was the 18th season for the Connecticut Sun franchise of the WNBA. It was the 14th season for the franchise in Connecticut. The season tipped off on May 14 in Chicago versus the Chicago Sky.

The Sun went 3–0 in the preseason, but could not carry that momentum over to the regular season as they opened with a loss. They won their second game of the season over San Antonio before losing their next four straight games to end May 1–5. Their losing streak extended into June as they lost their first two games before defeating Seattle by a point. The Sun would lose their next three games, including a triple-overtime thriller against Washington 106–109. They defeated San Antonio again to break their losing streak before losing three straight games to finish June 2–8. July started much better for the Sun as they won three of their first four games, matching their win total from the first two months of the season. Their only loss came at home to Atlanta, 63–67. They lost two games and won to games to end the month 5–3. Upon return from the Olympic Break, the Sun went 2–1 in August, defeating Minnesota and San Antonio at home and losing to Atlanta away. They opened September with a win over Phoenix, but lost their next three games. They finished the season with three wins and finished September 4–3. Their 14–20 overall record saw them finish ninth overall, two games out of the final playoff spot.

== Transactions ==
=== WNBA draft ===
Round	Pick	Player	Nationality	School/Team/Country
1	3	Morgan Tuck	United States	Connecticut
1	4	Rachel Banham	United States	Minnesota
1	6	Jonquel Jones	Bahamas	George Washington
2	17	Jamie Weisner	Canada	Oregon State
3	27	Aliyyah Handford	United States	St. John's

=== Trades/Roster Changes ===
Date	Details
February 3, 2016	Traded Elizabeth Williams to the Atlanta Dream in exchange for the 4th Overall Pick in the 2016 WNBA draft
April 14, 2016	Traded Chelsea Gray the 15th and 23rds pick in the 2016 draft, and the 4th pick in the 2017 WNBA draft to the Los Angeles Sparks in exchange for the rights to Jonquel Jones and the 17th pick in the 2016 draft.
June 25, 2016	Traded Kelsey Bone to the Phoenix Mercury in exchange for Courtney Williams, the rights to Jillian Alleyne and the 13th pick in the 2017 draft.

== Roster ==
2016 Connecticut Sun roster
Players
Coaches

Pos.	No.	Nat.	Name	Height	Weight	DOB	From	Yrs
G	1	(United States)	Banham, Rachel (injured)	5' 10" (1.78m)	181 lb (82kg)	1993-07-15	Minnesota	R
G	20	(United States)	Bentley, Alex	5' 7" (1.7m)	152 lb (69kg)	1990-10-27	Penn State	3
G	34	(United States)	Faris, Kelly	5' 11" (1.8m)	154 lb (70kg)	1991-12-31	Connecticut	3
F/C	15	(Jamaica)	Henry, Aneika	6' 4" (1.93m)	192 lb (87kg)	1986-02-13	Florida	4
F/C	35	(The Bahamas)	Jones, Jonquel	6' 6" (1.98m)	215 lb (98kg)	1994-01-05	George Washington	R
F	2	(United States)	Little, Camille	6' 2" (1.88m)	180 lb (82kg)	1985-01-18	North Carolina	9
F/C	13	(United States)	Ogwumike, Chiney	6' 3" (1.91m)	183 lb (83kg)	1992-03-22	Stanford	1
F	40	(United States)	Stricklen, Shekinna	6' 2" (1.88m)	230 lb (104kg)	1990-07-30	Tennessee	4
F	31	(United States)	Taylor, Asia	6' 1" (1.85m)	167 lb (76kg)	1991-08-22	Louisville	1
F	25	(United States)	Thomas, Alyssa	6' 2" (1.88m)	203 lb (92kg)	1992-04-12	Maryland	2
G	5	(United States)	Thomas, Jasmine	5' 9" (1.75m)	143 lb (65kg)	1989-09-30	Duke	5
F	33	(United States)	Tuck, Morgan (injured)	6' 2" (1.88m)	207 lb (94kg)	1994-04-30	Connecticut	R
G	10	(United States)	Williams, Courtney	5' 8" (1.73m)	142 lb (64kg)	1994-05-11	South Florida	R

Head coach
(United States) Curt Miller (Baldwin Wallace)
Assistant coaches
(United States) Nicki Collen (Marquette)
(United States) Steve Smith
Athletic trainer
(United States) Jeremy Norman (Keene State)
Strength and conditioning coach
(United States) Tim Yuhas (Connecticut)

Legend

- (C) Team captain
- (DP) Unsigned draft pick
- (FA) Free agent
- (S) Suspended
- Injured

== Game log ==
=== Preseason ===
2016 pre-season game log
May: 3–0 (Home: 2–0; Road: 1–0)

Game	Date	Team	Score	High points	High rebounds	High assists	Location Attendance	Record
1	May 4	Chicago	W 84–81	Kelsey Bone (15)	Alyssa Thomas (7)	Bone, A. Thomas, J. Thomas, Tuck (5)	Mohegan Sun Arena; 4,207	1–0
2	May 5	San Antonio	W 76–53	Morgan Tuck (16)	Jonquel Jones (12)	Kelly Faris (3)	Mohegan Sun Arena; 4,025	2–0
3	May 8	@ Dallas	W 82–74	Jonquel Jones (16)	Kelly Faris (7)	Rachel Banham (7)	College Park Center; 2,326	3–0

2016 pre-season schedule

=== Regular season ===
2016 game log
Total: 14–20 (Home: 8–9; Road: 6–11)
May: 1–5 (Home: 0–2; Road: 1–3)

Game	Date	Team	Score	High points	High rebounds	High assists	Location Attendance	Record
1	May 14	@ Chicago	L 70–93	Alex Bentley (14)	A. Thomas, Tuck (7)	Alyssa Thomas (4)	Allstate Arena; 6,719	0–1
2	May 19	@ San Antonio	W 72–68	Camille Little (13)	Kelsey Bone (10)	Jasmine Thomas (8)	AT&T Center; 6,267	1–1
3	May 21	Washington	L 76–84	Alyssa Thomas (18)	Kelsey Bone (10)	Jasmine Thomas (7)	Mohegan Sun Arena; 6,022	1–2
4	May 26	Los Angeles	L 72–77	Jasmine Thomas (17)	Chiney Ogwumike (9)	Bentley, J. Thomas (4)	Mohegan Sun Arena; 4,766	1–3
5	May 28	@ Seattle	L 81–93	Jasmine Thomas (17)	Jasmine Thomas (5)	Camille Little (6)	KeyArena; 4,456	1–4
6	May 31	@ Phoenix	L 90–99	Camille Little (16)	Kelsey Bone (8)	Jasmine Thomas (6)	Talking Stick Resort Arena; 8,412	1–5

June : 2–8 (Home: 2–4; Road: 0–4)

Game	Date	Team	Score	High points	High rebounds	High assists	Location Attendance	Record
7	June 3	Atlanta	L 77–83	Alex Bentley (16)	Kelsey Bone (7)	Jasmine Thomas (5)	Mohegan Sun Arena; 4,541	1–6
8	June 5	Indiana	L 77–88	Alyssa Thomas (20)	Jonquel Jones (9)	Rachel Banham (3)	Mohegan Sun Arena; 5,346	1–7
9	June 10	Seattle	W 77–76	Morgan Tuck (20)	Alyssa Thomas (9)	Alyssa Thomas (4)	Mohegan Sun Arena; 8,075	2–7
10	June 12	@ Atlanta	L 87–93	Jasmine Thomas (19)	Bentley, Ogwumike, Tuck (6)	Bentley, Thomas (5)	Philips Arena; 4,486	2–8
11	June 14	Washington	L 106–109 3OT	Alex Bentley (31)	Kelsey Bone (11)	Camille Little (4)	Mohegan Sun Arena; 4,442	2–9
12	June 16	New York	L 72–80	Alex Bentley (16)	Kelsey Bone (7)	Kelsey Bone (4)	Mohegan Sun Arena; 4,786	2–10
13	June 19	San Antonio	W 90–83	Alex Bentley (29)	Jones, J. Thomas (9)	Jasmine Thomas (10)	Mohegan Sun Arena; 5,596	3–10
14	June 24	@ Seattle	L 81–98	Alex Bentley (13)	Alyssa Thomas (6)	Alex Bentley (4)	KeyArena; 6,568	3–11
15	June 26	@ Los Angeles	L 73–80	Chiney Ogwumike (16)	Alyssa Thomas (9)	Alyssa Thomas (7)	Staples Center; 9,441	3–12
16	June 29	@ Phoenix	L 75–86	Alex Bentley (20)	Jonquel Jones (9)	Alex Bentley (6)	Talking Stick Resort Arena; 10,551	3–13

July : 5–3 (Home: 1–2; Road: 4–1)

Game	Date	Team	Score	High points	High rebounds	High assists	Location Attendance	Record
17	July 2	@ Dallas	W 86–83	Alex Bentley (24)	Chiney Ogwumike (9)	Jasmine Thomas (7)	College Park Center; 5,108	4–13
18	July 7	Minnesota	W 93–83	Alex Bentley (24)	Chiney Ogwumike (7)	Jasmine Thomas (7)	Mohegan Sun Arena; 6,739	5–13
19	July 10	Atlanta	L 63–67	Alyssa Thomas (19)	Ogwumike, J. Thomas (5)	Alex Bentley (3)	Mohegan Sun Arena; 5,857	5–14
20	July 13	@ Indiana	W 86–64	Chiney Ogwumike (20)	Chiney Ogwumike (8)	Jasmine Thomas (6)	Bankers Life Fieldhouse; 12,272	6–14
21	July 15	Los Angeles	L 92–98	Alyssa Thomas (17)	Chiney Ogwumike (13)	Bentley, J. Thomas, Little (5)	Mohegan Sun Arena; 6,430	6–15
22	July 17	@ New York	L 76–83	Chiney Ogwumike (18)	Chiney Ogwumike (10)	Jasmine Thomas (6)	Madison Square Garden; 9,464	6–16
23	July 20	@ Dallas	W 89–78	Chiney Ogwumike (26)	Chiney Ogwumike (15)	Morgan Tuck (5)	College Park Center; 4,873	7–16
24	July 22	@ Chicago	W 94–89	Alex Bentley (21)	Jonquel Jones (10)	Jasmine Thomas (8)	Allstate Arena; 6,893	8–16

August : 2–1 (Home: 2–0; Road: 0–1)

Game	Date	Team	Score	High points	High rebounds	High assists	Location Attendance	Record
25	August 26	Minnesota	W 84–80	Alyssa Thomas (15)	Chiney Ogwumike (10)	Jasmine Thomas (6)	Mohegan Sun Arena; 7,381	9–16
26	August 28	@ Atlanta	L 73–87	Chiney Ogwumike (24)	Courtney Williams (7)	Jasmine Thomas (4)	Philips Arena; 7,055	9–17
27	August 30	San Antonio	W 89–62	Alex Bentley (21)	Alyssa Thomas (7)	Camille Little (7)	Mohegan Sun Arena; 5,291	10–17

September : 4–3 (Home: 3–1; Road: 1–2)

Game	Date	Team	Score	High points	High rebounds	High assists	Location Attendance	Record
28	September 2	Phoenix	W 87–74	Chiney Ogwumike (22)	Chiney Ogwumike (10)	Jasmine Thomas (6)	Mohegan Sun Arena; 6,709	11–17
29	September 4	@ Minnesota	L 79–93	Alex Bentley (16)	Jonquel Jones (11)	Alex Bentley (6)	Target Center; 7,632	11–18
30	September 9	@ New York	L 82–89	Ogwumike, Williams (20)	Chiney Ogwumike (9)	Jasmine Thomas (4)	Madison Square Garden; 9,482	11–19
31	September 11	Chicago Sky	L 86–96	Jasmine Thomas (20)	Chiney Ogwumike (10)	Jasmine Thomas (6)	Mohegan Sun Arena; 6,620	11–20
32	September 13	Indiana	W 89–87	Jasmine Thomas (21)	A. Thomas, J. Thomas (5)	Jasmine Thomas (6)	Mohegan Sun Arena; 4,407	12–20
33	September 16	Dallas	W 107–74	Little, Williams (15)	Chiney Ogwumike (13)	Jasmine Thomas (6)	Mohegan Sun Arena; 6,228	13–20
34	September 18	@ Washington	W 87–78	Jonquel Jones (21)	Ogwumike, A. Thomas (10)	Jasmine Thomas (10)	Verizon Center; 8,991	14–20

2016 season schedule

== Standings ==
Eastern Conference	W	L	PCT	GB	Home	Road	Conf.
3 - New York Liberty	21	13	.618	—	10–7	11–6	11–5
4 - Chicago Sky	18	16	.529	3	11–6	7–10	8–8
5 - Indiana Fever	17	17	.500	4	8–9	9–8	8–8
6 - Atlanta Dream	17	17	.500	4	11–6	6–11	9–7
e - Connecticut Sun	14	20	.412	7	8–9	6–11	4–12
e - Washington Mystics	13	21	.382	8	5–12	8–9	8–8

== Awards and honors ==
Recipient	Award	Date awarded	Ref.
Jasmine Thomas	WNBA Eastern Conference Player of the Week	September 19, 2016	
Jasmine Thomas	All-Defensive Second Team	September 30, 2016	

== Statistics ==
Legend
GP	Games played	GS	Games started	MPG	Minutes per game	RPG	Rebounds per game
APG	Assists per game	SPG	Steals per game	BPG	Blocks per game	PPG	Points per game
FG%	Field-goal percentage	3P%	3-point field-goal percentage	FT%	Free-throw percentage	TO	Turnovers per game
PF	Fouls per game		Team leader		League leader

=== Regular season ===
Player	GP	GS	MPG	FG%	3P%	FT%	RPG	APG	SPG	BPG	PPG
Alex Bentley	34	34	28.8	38.5%	28.6%	78.5%	1.9	2.5	0.9	0.1	12.9
Chiney Ogwumike	33	18	24.3	58.7%	—	71.9%	6.7	0.7	1.0	1.0	12.6
Jasmine Thomas	34	34	32.1	40.8%	29.7%	86.1%	4.1	5.1	1.3	0.4	11.7
Alyssa Thomas	31	31	27.1	48.7%	—	63.4%	6.0	2.3	1.4	0.2	11.1
Kelsey Bone	14	13	23.9	43.3%	26.7%	66.7%	5.4	1.3	0.7	0.2	10.7
Courtney Williams	19	0	17.2	42.7%	30.8%	57.9%	3.6	1.5	0.6	0.2	8.1
Camille Little	33	29	24.6	38.4%	32.2%	63.2%	3.0	2.0	1.2	0.3	7.8
Morgan Tuck	26	3	16.7	41.4%	30.4%	71.1%	2.8	1.1	0.4	0.1	7.0
Jonquel Jones	34	6	14.1	53.1%	33.3%	73.9%	3.7	0.6	0.6	1.1	6.8
Shekinna Stricklen	28	0	10.9	36.5%	35.1%	64.3%	1.4	0.5	0.4	0.1	4.0
Rachel Banham	15	0	10.9	40.8%	35.1%	66.7%	0.7	0.9	0.5	0.1	3.7
Asia Taylor	4	0	4.3	60.0%	—	85.7%	1.0	0.8	0.0	0.0	3.0
Kelly Faris	31	0	10.2	39.6%	25.0%	93.3%	1.2	0.7	0.7	0.1	2.0
Aneika Henry	10	2	5.0	38.5%	—	40.0%	1.4	0.2	0.1	0.1	1.2
