= Jazmon Gwathmey =

Puerto Rican basketball player (born 1993)

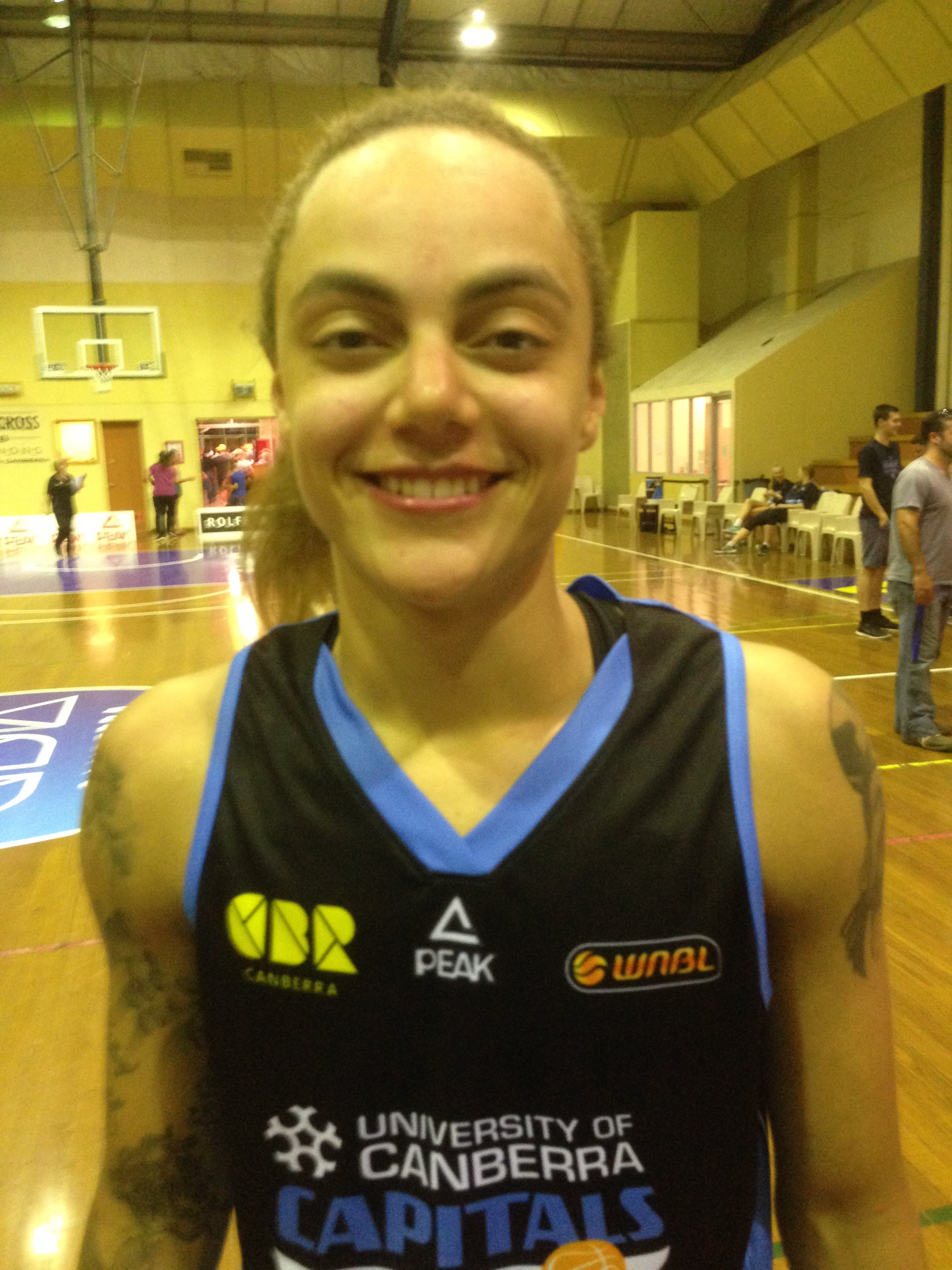
- Gwathmey in 2016

No. 21 – Geas Basket
- Position: Shooting guard
- League: Lega Basket Femminile

Personal information
- Born: January 24, 1993 (age 33) Bealeton, Virginia, U.S.
- Listed height: 6 ft 2 in (1.88 m)
- Listed weight: 158 lb (72 kg)

Career information
- High school: Liberty (Bealeton, Virginia)
- College: James Madison (2012–2016)
- WNBA draft: 2016: 2nd round, 14th overall pick
- Drafted by: Minnesota Lynx
- Playing career: 2016–present

Career history
- 2016: San Antonio Stars
- 2016–2017: Canberra Capitals
- 2017–2018: Indiana Fever
- 2018–present: Lointek Gernika Bizkaia
- NKA Universitas PEAC Pécs

Career highlights
- CAA Player of the Year (2016); 3× CAA tournament MVP (2014–2016); First-team All-CAA (2016); Third-team All-CAA (2015); 2× CAA All-Defensive Team (2014, 2016); CAA All-Freshman Team (2014)
- Stats at WNBA.com
- Stats at Basketball Reference
Medals
Women's basketball
Representing Puerto Rico
FIBA AmeriCup
Silver medal – second place	2021 San Juan
Pan American Games
Bronze medal – third place	2019 Lima	Team
Central American and Caribbean Games
Bronze medal – third place	2018 Barranquilla	Team
Centrobasket
Gold medal – first place	2018 Manatí

Jazmon Chameli Gwathmey (born January 24, 1993) is a Puerto Rican professional basketball player for Lointek Gernika Bizkaia of the Liga Femenina de Baloncesto. She played for Indiana Fever of the Women's National Basketball Association (WNBA).

== Career ==
=== College ===
Gwathmey averaged 11.4 points, 5.4 rebounds and 1.3 blocks in four seasons (20112-16) at James Madison. She is a three-time Colonial Athletic Association Player of the Year and CAA tournament Most Outstanding Player, winning the awards in 2014, 2015 and 2016.

=== WNBA ===
Gwathmey was drafted 14th overall in the second round by the Minnesota Lynx in the 2016 WNBA draft. Gwathmey was later traded to the San Antonio Stars in exchange for guard Jia Perkins. In 2017, Gwathmey was traded to the Indiana Fever in exchange for a 2018 third-round draft pick.

=== International ===
On June 23, 2017, Gwathmey was included in the Puerto Rican preliminary roster for the 2017 Centrobasket Women.

On 2019 Jazmon Gwathmey became BSNF Champion with the Atenienses de Manatí.

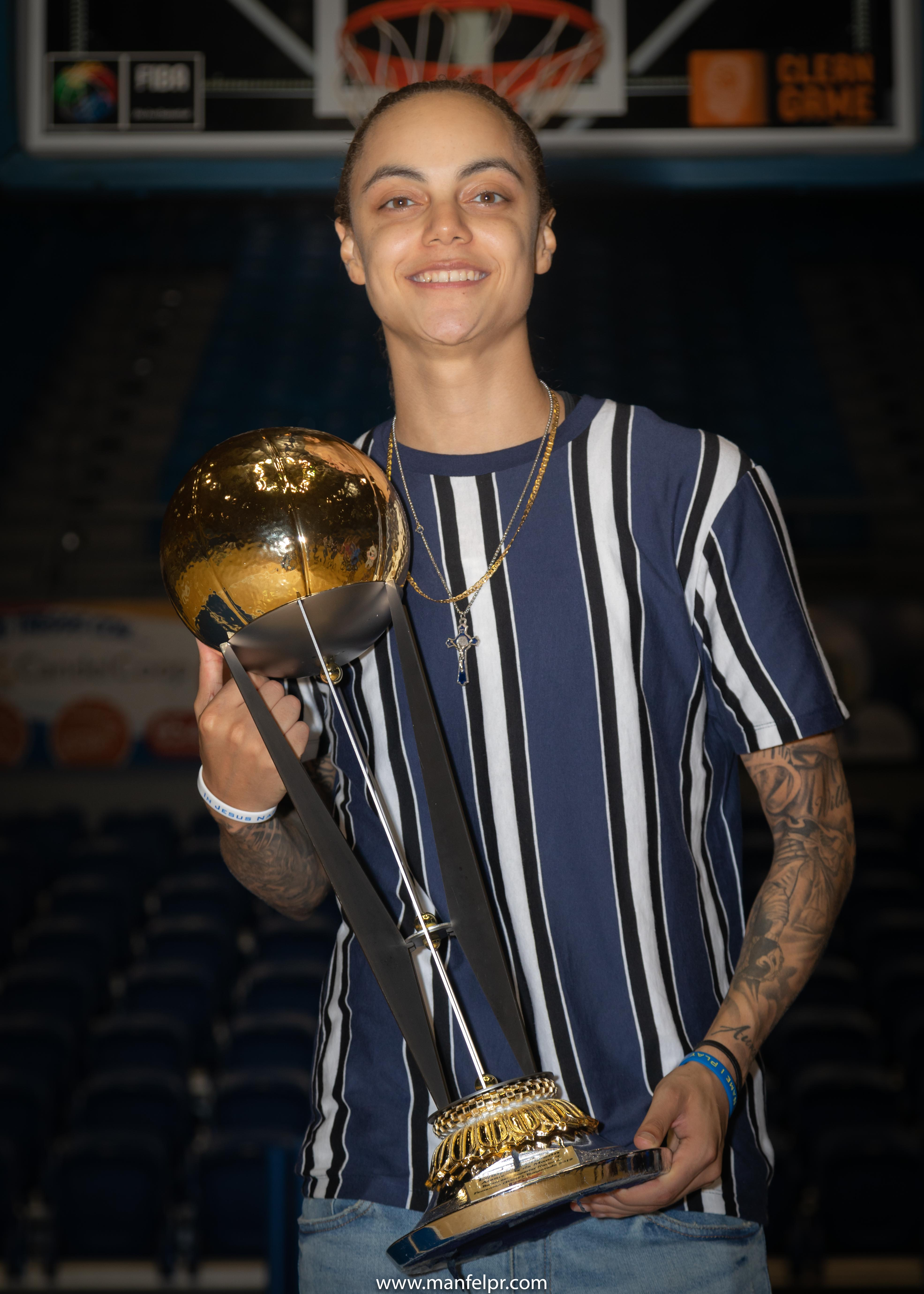
Jazmon Gwathmey holding the 2019 BSNF trophy for the Atenienses de Manatí BSNF

== Career statistics ==
Legend
GP	Games played	GS	Games started	MPG	Minutes per game	RPG	Rebounds per game
APG	Assists per game	SPG	Steals per game	BPG	Blocks per game	PPG	Points per game
TO	Turnovers per game	FG%	Field-goal percentage	3P%	3-point field-goal percentage	FT%	Free-throw percentage
**Bold**	Career best	°	League leader

=== WNBA ===
==== Regular season ====
WNBA regular season statistics
Year	Team	GP	GS	MPG	FG%	3P%	FT%	RPG	APG	SPG	BPG	TO	PPG
2016	San Antonio	22	**10**	16.0	34.6	**33.3**	**76.9**	1.7	0.7	0.4	0.4	**0.5**	3.3
2017	Indiana	**28**	7	**17.1**	**36.0**	23.6	75.0	**2.0**	0.8	**0.5**	**0.8**	1.3	**6.2**
2018	Indiana	10	3	11.6	23.1	9.1	50.0	1.7	**0.9**	0.3	0.2	0.7	2.4
**Career**	3 years, 2 teams	60	20	15.8	33.9	24.7	71.8	1.8	0.8	0.4	0.5	0.9	4.5

=== College ===
NCAA statistics
Year	Team	GP	Points	FG%	3P%	FT%	RPG	APG	SPG	BPG	PPG
2011–12	James Madison	Did not play (redshirt)									
2012–13	James Madison	**36**	224	39.9%	25.0%	57.7%	5.5	0.7	0.5	0.9	6.2
2013–14	James Madison	34	340	**46.9%**	30.3%	**83.5%**	5.3	**1.6**	0.8	1.6	10.0
2014–15	James Madison	33	309	39.5%	31.4%	72.5%	4.8	**1.6**	0.9	1.1	9.4
2015–16	James Madison	33	**682**	41.0%	**36.8%**	79.6%	**6.0**	1.5	**1.2**	**1.5**	**20.7**
**Career**		136	1555	41.6%	33.9%	74.8%	5.4	1.4	0.8	1.3	11.4

== Personal life ==
Gwathmey is of Puerto Rican descent on her mother's side of the family, making her eligible to play for the Puerto Rican national team.
