= Liaoning Leopards =

Liaoning Leopards may refer to:

- Liaoning Flying Leopards, a men's basketball club playing in the Chinese Basketball Association
- Liaoning Flying Eagles, a women's basketball club playing in the Women's Chinese Basketball Association, formerly known as Liaoning Golden Leopards
