= 2016 Atlanta Dream season =

- Head coach: Michael Cooper
- Arena: Philips Arena

Results
- Record: 17–17 (.500)
- Place: 4th (Eastern)
- Playoff finish: Lost in Second Round to Chicago Sky

The 2016 WNBA season is the 9th season for the Atlanta Dream of the Women's National Basketball Association. The regular season began May 14 and concluded September 18. The Dream qualified for the playoffs as the sixth seed after missing the playoffs the previous year, finishing 17–17. The Dream defeated the Seattle Storm in the first round of the playoffs before falling to the Chicago Sky in the second round to end their season.

== Transactions ==
=== WNBA draft ===
Round	Pick	Player	Nationality	School/team/country
1	11	Bria Holmes	United States	West Virginia
2	13	Rachel Hollivay	United States	Rutgers
2	16	Courtney Walker	United States	Texas A&M
3	28	Niya Johnson	United States	Baylor

=== Trades and Roster Changes ===
Date	Transaction
January 5, 2016	Exercised 4th-Year Team Options on Damiris Dantas and Shoni Schimmel
January 6, 2016	Extended Qualifying Offers to Amanda Thompson, Aneika Henry-Morello, Tiffany Hayes, and Cierra Burdick
February 1, 2016	Signed Tiffany Hayes
February 2, 2016	Signed Carla Cortijo
February 3, 2016	Traded the 4th Overall Pick in the 2016 WNBA draft to the Connecticut Sun in exchange for Elizabeth Williams
February 10, 2016	Signed Matee Ajavon
March 1, 2016	Signed Cierra Burdick
March 1, 2016	Signed Ariel Massengale to a rookie-scale contract
March 3, 2016	Signed Kara Braxton, Amanda Thompson, Meighan Simmons to training-camp contracts
April 19, 2016	Signed Tina Roy to a training-camp contract
April 19, 2016	Signed Bria Holmes to a rookie-scale contract
April 21, 2016	Signed Niya Johnson and Courtney Walker to rookie-scale contracts
April 27, 2016	Waived Kara Braxton
April 29, 2016	Waived Tina Roy and Amanda Thompson
May 2, 2016	Traded Shoni Schimmel to the New York Liberty in exchange for a 2nd Round Pick in the 2017 WNBA draft
May 9, 2016	Claimed Jordan Jones of the Waivers
May 10, 2016	Waived Ariel Massengale and Niya Johnson
May 10, 2016	Traded the 2nd Round Pick received from the Liberty to the Indiana Fever in exchange for Layshia Clarendon
May 11, 2016	Suspended Damiris Dantas for the Full Season due to Overseas Commitments
May 12, 2016	Waived DeLisha Milton-Jones, Courtney Walker, Jordan Jones, and Roneeka Hodges
May 13, 2016	Signed Rachel Hollivay to their rookie-scale contract
June 10, 2016	Temporarily Suspend Sancho Lyttle due to Overseas Commitments
June 10, 2016	Signed Avery Warley-Talbert
June 19, 2016	Waived Avery Warley-Talbert
June 21, 2016	Activated Sancho Lyttle from the Temporary Suspension
June 27, 2016	Waived Cierra Burdick
June 27, 2016	Claimed Markeisha Gatling of a Waivers
December 6, 2016	Exercised the 4th-Year Team Option on Reshanda Gray and Elizabeth Williams

== Roster ==
2016 Atlanta Dream roster
Players
Coaches

Pos.	No.	Nat.	Name	Height	Weight	DOB	From	Yrs
G	10	(United States)	Ajavon, Matee	5' 8" (1.73m)	160 lb (73kg)	1986-05-07	Rutgers	8
G	23	(United States)	Clarendon, Layshia	5' 9" (1.75m)	140 lb (64kg)	1991-05-02	California	3
G	8	(Puerto Rico)	Cortijo, Carla	5' 8" (1.73m)	135 lb (61kg)	1987-07-21	Texas	1
C	12	(Brazil)	Dantas, Damiris (S)	6' 3" (1.91m)	196 lb (89kg)	1992-11-17	Brazil	2
C	34	(United States)	Gatling, Markeisha	6' 5" (1.96m)	195 lb (88kg)	1992-07-14	NC State	2
F	21	(United States)	Gray, Reshanda	6' 2" (1.88m)	192 lb (87kg)	1993-06-01	California	1
G	15	(United States)	Hayes, Tiffany	5' 10" (1.78m)	155 lb (70kg)	1989-09-20	Connecticut	4
C	14	(United States)	Hollivay, Rachel	6' 4" (1.93m)	210 lb (95kg)	1993-10-24	Rutgers	R
G	32	(United States)	Holmes, Bria	6' 1" (1.85m)	170 lb (77kg)	1994-04-19	West Virginia	R
F	20	(Spain)	Lyttle, Sancho	6' 4" (1.93m)	175 lb (79kg)	1983-09-20	Houston	11
F	35	(United States)	McCoughtry, Angel	6' 1" (1.85m)	160 lb (73kg)	1986-09-10	Louisville	7
G	0	(United States)	Simmons, Meighan	5' 9" (1.75m)	140 lb (64kg)	1992-01-25	Tennessee	R
F/C	52	(United States)	Williams, Elizabeth	6' 3" (1.91m)	192 lb (87kg)	1993-06-23	Duke	1

Head coach
(United States) Michael Cooper (New Mexico)
Assistant coaches
(United States) Miles Cooper (USC)
(United States) Karleen Thompson (USC)
Athletic trainer
(United States) Michael Douglas (Morehouse)

Legend

- (C) Team captain
- (DP) Unsigned draft pick
- (FA) Free agent
- (S) Suspended
- Injured

=== Depth ===
Pos.	Starter	Bench
C	Elizabeth Williams	Rachel Hollivay; Markeisha Gatling
PF	Sancho Lyttle	Reshanda Gray
SF	Angel McCoughtry	Bria Holmes
SG	Tiffany Hayes	Matee Ajavon; Meighan Simmons
PG	Layshia Clarendon	Carla Cortijo

== Schedule ==
=== Preseason ===
2016 Game Log: Preseason
Total: 0–4 (Home: 1–0; Road: 0–0)

Game	Date	Opponent	Score	High points	High rebounds	High assists	Location/Attendance	Record
1	May 4	vs. San Antonio	L 67–74	Simmons (10)	Williams (10)	Tied (3)	Mohegan Sun Arena; 4,199	0–1
2	May 5	vs. Chicago	L 75–95	Williams (12)	Hollivay (6)	Holmes (8)	Mohegan Sun Arena; 4,025	0–2
3	May 7	@ Los Angeles	L 80–88	Holmes (18)	Gray (8)	Cortijo (6)	Pasadena College; 460	0–3
4	May 10	Los Angeles	L 63–69	Simmons (11)	Williams (13)	Ajavon (4)	McCamish Pavilion; 1,385	0–4

2016 pre-season schedule

=== Regular season ===
2016 Regular Season
Total: 17–17 (Home: 11–6; Road: 6–11)
May: 5–1 (Home: 2–0; Road: 3–1)

Game	Date	Opponent	Score	High points	High rebounds	High assists	Location/Attendance	Record
1	May 14	@ San Antonio	W 73–63	McCoughtry (15)	Williams (10)	Tied (3)	AT&T Center; 7,572	1–0
2	May 20	@ Indiana	L 85–94	Tied (19)	McCoughtry (8)	3 Tied (2)	Bankers Life Fieldhouse; 7,608	1–1
3	May 22	Chicago	W 87–81	McCoughtry (21)	Clarendon (8)	Cortijo (5)	Philips Arena; 6,152	2–1
4	May 24	@ New York	W 85–79 (OT)	Hayes (27)	Lyttle (14)	Tied (3)	Madison Square Garden; 14,503	3–1
5	May 27	@ Dallas	W 102–93	McCoughtry (26)	Lyttle (10)	Lyttle (6)	College Park Center; 4,712	4–1
6	May 29	Indiana	W 85–76	McCoughtry (22)	Williams (7)	Hayes (6)	Philips Arena; 5,233	5–1

June: 3–7 (Home: 2–3; Road: 1–4)

Game	Date	Opponent	Score	High points	High rebounds	High assists	Location/Attendance	Record
7	June 3	@ Connecticut	W 83–77	Hayes (23)	Lyttle (11)	McCoughtry (4)	Mohegan Sun Arena; 4,541	6–1
8	June 5	Washington	L 79–86	McCoughtry (28)	Lyttle (11)	Cortijo (5)	Philips Arena; 3,611	6–2
9	June 10	Minnesota	L 78–110	Hayes (23)	Clarendon (7)	McCoughtry (4)	Philips Arena; 5,368	6–3
10	June 12	Connecticut	W 93–87	Williams (20)	Williams (10)	Clarendon (9)	Philips Arena; 4,486	7–3
11	June 17	Chicago	W 101–97	McCoughtry (22)	Williams (9)	Hayes (5)	Philips Arena; 4,560	8–3
12	June 18	@ Washington	L 65–95	Hayes (12)	McCoughtry (8)	Cortijo (4)	Verizon Center; 6,977	8–4
13	June 22	New York	L 79–90	McCoughtry (22)	Lyttle (11)	Tied (4)	Philips Arena; 10,345	8–5
14	June 25	@ San Antonio	L 69–73	McCoughtry (23)	Williams (10)	Tied (3)	AT&T Center; 9,439	8–6
15	June 28	@ Seattle	L 81–84	McCoughtry (22)	Hollivay (9)	Tied (3)	KeyArena; 4,648	8–7
16	June 30	@ Los Angeles	L 75–84	Hayes (32)	Williams (10)	Clarendon (7)	Staples Center; 10,215	8–8

July: 5–4 (Home: 4–1; Road: 1–3)

Game	Date	Opponent	Score	High points	High rebounds	High assists	Location/Attendance	Record
17	July 3	Phoenix	L 87–95	Hayes (26)	Williams (9)	Hayes (5)	Philips Arena; 6,557	8–9
18	July 5	Seattle	W 77–64	Lyttle (22)	Lyttle (11)	Tied (4)	Philips Arena; 3,983	9–9
19	July 8	Dallas	W 95–90 (OT)	Tied (27)	Lyttle (14)	McCoughtry (9)	Philips Arena; 6,745	10–9
20	July 10	@ Connecticut	W 67–63	McCoughtry (26)	Lyttle (14)	Lyttle (3)	Mohegan Sun Arena; 5,857	11–9
21	July 13	@ New York	L 86–62	Hayes (12)	Lyttle (9)	Clarendon (3)	Madison Square Garden; 11,317	11–10
22	July 15	@ Indiana	L 72–78	Cortijo (20)	Williams (8)	McCoughtry (6)	Bankers Life Fieldhouse; 8,612	11–11
23	July 17	Los Angeles	W 91–74	Tied (17)	Williams (12)	Clarendon (6)	Philips Arena; 7,551	12–11
24	July 20	@ Minnesota	L 65–83	Clarendon (11)	Williams (8)	Tied (2)	Target Center; 16,132	12–12
25	July 22	Dallas	W 93–88	Gray (22)	Williams (11)	McCoughtry (5)	McCamish Pavilion; 4,749	13–12

August: 1–1 (Home: 1–0; Road: 0–1)

Game	Date	Opponent	Score	High points	High rebounds	High assists	Location/Attendance	Record
26	August 26	@ Chicago	L 82–90	Tied (19)	Williams (9)	Tied (4)	Allstate Arena; 6,016	13–13
27	August 28	Connecticut	W 87–73	McCoughtry (22)	Williams (8)	3 Tied (5)	Philips Arena; 7,055	14–13

September: 3–4 (Home: 2–2; Road: 1–2)

Game	Date	Opponent	Score	High points	High rebounds	High assists	Location/Attendance	Record
28	September 4	Seattle	L 82–91	McCoughtry (32)	Williams (6)	Williams (4)	Philips Arena; 5,695	14–14
29	September 6	Phoenix	W 91–87	McCoughtry (27)	McCoughtry (8)	Clarendon (6)	Philips Arena; 3,625	15–14
30	September 8	@ Los Angeles	W 86–81	McCoughtry (32)	Williams (12)	Clarendon (6)	Staples Center; 6,152	16–14
31	September 11	@ Phoenix	L 75–86	Hayes (22)	Williams (16)	Clarendon (4)	Talking Stick Resort Arena; 9,877	16–15
32	September 13	San Antonio	L 67–71	Holmes (20)	Williams (12)	Hayes (4)	Philips Arena; 5,312	16–16
33	September 15	Washington	W 94–91	McCoughtry (31)	Williams (10)	Clarendon (9)	Philips Arena; 4,404	17–16
34	September 17	@ Minnesota	L 87–95	McCoughtry (18)	Williams (9)	Clarendon (7)	Target Center; 11,663	17–17

2016 season schedule

=== Playoffs ===
2016 Playoffs
Total: 1–1 (Home: 1–0; Road: 0–1)

Game	Date	Opponent	Score	High points	High rebounds	High assists	Location/Attendance	Record
1	September 21	Seattle	W 94–85	McCoughtry (37)	Williams (16)	Tied (7)	McCamish Pavilion; 2,553	1–0
2	September 25	@ Chicago	L 98–108	Hayes (30)	Williams (9)	McCoughtry (9)	Allstate Arena; 3,922	0–1

2016 playoff schedule

== Standings ==
Eastern Conference	W	L	PCT	GB	Home	Road	Conf.
3 - New York Liberty	21	13	.618	—	10–7	11–6	11–5
4 - Chicago Sky	18	16	.529	3	11–6	7–10	8–8
5 - Indiana Fever	17	17	.500	4	8–9	9–8	8–8
6 - Atlanta Dream	17	17	.500	4	11–6	6–11	9–7
e - Connecticut Sun	14	20	.412	7	8–9	6–11	4–12
e - Washington Mystics	13	21	.382	8	5–12	8–9	8–8

Western Conference	W	L	PCT	GB	Home	Road	Conf.
1 - Minnesota Lynx	28	6	.824	—	15–2	13–4	15–1
2 - Los Angeles Sparks	26	8	.765	2	14–3	12–5	11–5
7 - Seattle Storm	16	18	.471	12	10–7	6–11	7–9
8 - Phoenix Mercury	16	18	.471	12	11–6	5–12	6–10
e - Dallas Wings	11	23	.324	17	6–11	5–12	8–8
e - San Antonio Stars	7	27	.206	21	4–13	3–14	1–15

== Playoffs ==
**First round** Single elimination (Sept. 21)
5	Indiana Fever	78
8	**Phoenix Mercury**	**89**
6	**Atlanta Dream**	**94**
7	Seattle Storm	85

**Second round** Single elimination (Sept. 24 and 25)
3	New York Liberty	94
8	**Phoenix Mercury**	**101**
4	**Chicago Sky**	**108**
6	Atlanta Dream	98

**Semifinals**; Best-of-5 (Sept. 28 – Oct. 6)
1	**Minnesota Lynx**	**3**
8	Phoenix Mercury	0
2	**Los Angeles Sparks**	**3**
4	Chicago Sky	1

**WNBA Finals**; Best-of-5 (Oct. 9 – 20)
1	Minnesota Lynx	2
2	**Los Angeles Sparks**	**3**

Note: Teams re-seeded after the second round and semifinals.

- **Bold** – Game or series winner
- Italic – Team with home-court advantage

== Statistics ==
Legend
GP	Games played	GS	Games started	MPG	Minutes per game	RPG	Rebounds per game
APG	Assists per game	SPG	Steals per game	BPG	Blocks per game	PPG	Points per game
FG%	Field-goal percentage	3P%	3-point field-goal percentage	FT%	Free-throw percentage	TO	Turnovers per game
PF	Fouls per game		Team leader		League leader

=== Regular season ===
Player	GP	GS	MPG	FG%	3P%	FT%	RPG	APG	SPG	BPG	PPG
Angel McCoughtry	33	32	30.0	.434	.302	.788	5.7	2.8	1.6	0.7	19.5
Tiffany Hayes	33	33	30.8	.441	.274	.804	3.4	2.4	1.2	0.2	15.0
Elizabeth Williams	34	34	34.7	.442	.000	.692	8.1	1.2	0.8	2.3	11.9
Layshia Clarendon	34	32	28.2	.466	.346	.765	4.3	3.5	0.7	0.1	10.4
Sancho Lyttle	19	18	30.1	.416	.222	.760	7.8	1.8	2.1	1.0	7.6
Bria Holmes	33	10	21.3	.435	.274	.774	2.6	1.2	0.9	0.2	7.5
Carla Cortijo	27	1	10.9	.354	.289	.781	1.6	1.6	0.3	0.0	4.7
Reshanda Gray	28	5	9.6	.521	.000	.556	2.5	0.1	0.1	0.1	3.4
Matee Ajavon	32	2	10.6	.305	.231	.750	1.6	1.2	0.4	0.3	3.3
Meighan Simmons	25	0	5.9	.289	.286	.833	0.4	0.3	0.1	0.1	2.6
Markeisha Gatling	16	2	10.5	.447	.000	.889	2.4	0.4	0.3	0.3	2.6
Rachel Hollivay	32	1	8.9	.316	.000	.469	2.1	0.1	0.1	0.4	1.2
Cierra Burdick	8	0	3.6	.125	.000	.500	0.5	0.0	0.0	0.0	0.4
Avery Warley-Talbert	1	0	4.0	.000	.000	.000	1.0	0.0	0.0	0.0	0.0

=== Playoffs ===
Player	GP	GS	MPG	FG%	3P%	FT%	RPG	APG	SPG	BPG	PPG
Angel McCoughtry	2	2	35.0	54.8	70.0	73.3	4.5	8.0	0.5	0.0	32.0
Tiffany Hayes	1	1	37.0	58.8	42.9	87.5	6.0	2.0	1.0	0.0	30.0
Bria Holmes	2	2	35.0	50.0	28.6	62.5	5.5	2.5	0.5	0.5	15.5
Elizabeth Williams	2	2	38.5	38.1	0.0	77.8	12.5	1.5	0.5	2.5	11.5
Layshia Clarendon	2	2	32.0	53.3	25.0	62.5	6.0	6.0	0.0	1.0	11.0
Matee Ajavon	2	1	15.5	50.0	0.0	100.0	2.5	0.5	0.0	0.0	7.0
Meighan Simmons	2	0	12.5	10.0	14.3	0.0	1.5	0.5	0.0	0.0	1.5
Markeisha Gatling	2	0	7.0	0.0	0.0	75.0	0.5	0.0	0.0	0.5	1.5
Carla Cortijo	2	0	3.0	50.0	0.0	0.0	0.5	0.0	0.0	0.0	1.0
Reshanda Gray	2	0	3.5	0.0	0.0	0.0	0.5	0.0	0.0	0.0	0.0

== Awards and honors ==
Recipient	Award	Date awarded	Ref.
Angel McCoughtry	Eastern Conference Player of the Week	May 31	
Angel McCoughtry	Eastern Conference Player of the Week	July 11	
Angel McCoughtry	All-Defensive First Team	September 30	
Angel McCoughtry	All-WNBA Second Team	October 14	
Elizabeth Williams	Most Improved Player Award	September 21	
