= Carla Cortijo =

Puerto Rican basketball player (born 1987)

Cangrejeros de Santurce
- Title: Assistant coach
- League: Baloncesto Superior Nacional

Personal information
- Born: July 21, 1987 (age 39) Carolina, Puerto Rico
- Listed height: 5 ft 8 in (1.73 m)
- Listed weight: 135 lb (61 kg)

Career information
- College: Texas (2005–2008)
- Playing career: 2008–2018
- Position: Point guard
- Coaching career: 2017–present

Career history

Playing
- 2014–2015: Gigantes de Carolina
- 2015–2017: Atlanta Dream
- 2015–2017: Gigantes de Carolina

Coaching
- 2017: Puerto Rico (assistant)
- 2021–present: Cangrejeros de Santurce (assistant)

Career highlights
- 3× BSNF champion (2014–2016); 2× BSNF Finals MVP (2014, 2015)
- Stats at WNBA.com
- Stats at Basketball Reference
Medals
Women's basketball
Representing Puerto Rico
Pan American Games
Gold medal – first place	2011 Guadalajara	Team competition
Centrobasket
Silver medal – second place	2012 Puerto Rico	Team competition
Silver medal – second place	2014 Mexico	Team competition
Central American and Caribbean Games
Gold medal – first place	2010 Mayagüez	Team competition
Silver medal – second place	2014 Mexico	Team competition

Carla Cortijo Sánchez (born July 21, 1987) is a Puerto Rican former professional basketball player. She played college basketball for the Texas Longhorns and the Puerto Rican national team.

== Early life ==
Cortijo was born in San Juan, Puerto Rico to Angel Cortijo and Lourdes Sanchez. She grew up in the city of Carolina, Puerto Rico. Cortijo first earned widespread fame for her basketball skills during two seasons of play for Maria Auxiliadora High School, which went undefeated and won the Puerto Rico commonwealth championship both years. Cortijo was named Puerto Rico's High School Basketball Player of the Year for 2002.

After Cortijo's sophomore season, her family moved to the Houston area. Cortijo attracted national attention as a star point guard for Bellaire High School. She also played AAU basketball for the Houston Elite squad, leading them to the 2004 AAU national title. Cortijo earned Parade Magazine All-American honors for her high school play, and was rated the nation's best point guard in her recruiting class by All Star Girls Report. However, she missed her entire high school senior season with an injury to her left knee.

== College career ==
Cortijo signed with the University of Texas. Early in her freshman season, she re-injured her knee, and received a medical redshirt waiver for the 2005–2006 season.

As a redshirt freshman in 2006–2007, Cortijo played in 28 games for the Longhorns and started in 18. She led the team in assists, with 137 on the season. Cortijo was one of five players named to the Big 12 All-Freshman Team and the Big 12 All-Academic First Team.

Cortijo announced during the offseason that she planned to transfer to St. John's University in New York. However, Texas coach Gail Goestenkors eventually persuaded Cortijo to rejoin the Longhorns for the 2007–2008 season.

== International career ==
Cortijo represented Puerto Rico in the international competitions sanctioned by FIBA. As regular point guard, she led the team to the gold medal at the 2011 Pan American Games, which advanced to the finals gathering victories over the United States, Argentina and Brazil. In the gold medal game, Cortijo scored 29 points and recovered 10 rebounds, being Puerto Rico's most productive player in the victory over Mexico.

She was a member of the team which competed for Puerto Rico at the 2011 Pan American Games, winning a gold medal.

=== Controversy ===
Cortijo alleged that the then Puerto Rican Basketball Federation president Carlos Beltrán denied her an opportunity to play in the Women's National Basketball Association (WNBA) for the Atlanta Dream in order for her to participate with the Puerto Rican women's national basketball team at the 2015 Edmonton, Alberta, Canada Women's Pre-Olympic qualifying tournament.

== Career statistics ==
Legend
GP	Games played	GS	Games started	MPG	Minutes per game	RPG	Rebounds per game
APG	Assists per game	SPG	Steals per game	BPG	Blocks per game	PPG	Points per game
TO	Turnovers per game	FG%	Field-goal percentage	3P%	3-point field-goal percentage	FT%	Free-throw percentage
**Bold**	Career best	°	League leader

=== WNBA ===
==== Regular season ====
WNBA regular season statistics
Year	Team	GP	GS	MPG	FG%	3P%	FT%	RPG	APG	SPG	BPG	TO	PPG
2015	Atlanta	2	0	**16.0**	**.556**	**.500**	.750	0.5	1.0	**1.0**	0.0	**0.5**	**7.0**
2016	Atlanta	**27**	**1**	10.9	.354	.289	**.781**	**1.6**	**1.6**	0.3	0.0	1.0	4.7
**Career**	2 years, 1 team	29	1	11.2	.368	.298	.778	1.5	1.6	0.3	0.0	1.0	4.9

==== Playoffs ====
WNBA playoff statistics
Year	Team	GP	GS	MPG	FG%	3P%	FT%	RPG	APG	SPG	BPG	TO	PPG
2016	Atlanta	2	0	3.0	.500	.000	—	0.5	0.0	0.0	0.0	0.0	1.0
**Career**	1 year, 1 team	2	0	3.0	.500	.000	—	0.5	0.0	0.0	0.0	0.0	1.0

=== College ===
NCAA statistics
Year	Team	GP	Points	FG%	3P%	FT%	RPG	APG	SPG	BPG	PPG
2005-06	Texas	6	45	37.8%	0.0%	**85.0%**	3.0	2.3	1.3	0.0	7.5
2006-07	Texas	30	223	36.3%	25.4%	73.0%	**4.4**	4.9	1.7	0.0	7.4
2007-08	Texas	**35**	**353**	37.5%	32.6%	75.8%	3.0	4.9	**2.0**	**0.1**	**10.1**
2008-09	Texas	33	230	**39.1%**	**39.1%**	71.1%	3.3	4.5	1.3	0.0	7.0
**Career**		104	851	37.6%	31.3%	74.5%	3.5	4.6	1.6	0.0	8.2

== See also ==
- List of famous Puerto Ricans
