= Bashaara Graves =

American basketball player (born 1994)

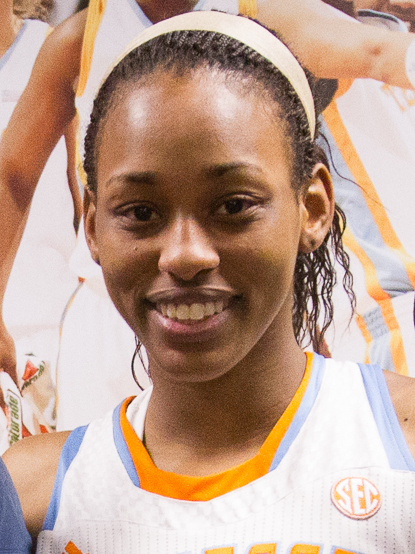

Olympiacos
- Position: Forward

Personal information
- Born: March 17, 1994 (age 32) Clarksville, Tennessee
- Listed height: 6 ft 2 in (1.88 m)

Career information
- High school: Clarksville (Clarksville, Tennessee)
- College: Tennessee (2012–2016)
- WNBA draft: 2016: 2nd round, 22nd overall pick
- Drafted by: Minnesota Lynx
- Playing career: 2016–present

Career history
- 2016: Minnesota Lynx
- 2017: Chicago Sky
- 2019–present: Olympiacos

Career highlights
- First-team All-SEC (2013); SEC Freshman of the Year (2013); SEC All-Freshman Team (2013); McDonald's All-American (2012)
- Stats at WNBA.com
- Stats at Basketball Reference
Medals
Women's basketball
Representing the United States
FIBA Under-19 World Cup
Gold medal – first place	2013 Lithuania	Team
FIBA Under-18 Americas Championship
Gold medal – first place	2012 Puerto Rico	Team
FIBA Under-17 World Cup
Gold medal – first place	2010 France	Team
FIBA Americas U16 Championship
Gold medal – first place	2009 Mexico	Team

Bashaara Keyana Graves (born March 17, 1994) is an American professional basketball player who plays for Olympiacos in Greece. She was drafted in 2016 by the Minnesota Lynx and she has played for the Chicago Sky of the Women's National Basketball Association (WNBA).

== WNBA career statistics ==
Legend
GP	Games played	GS	Games started	MPG	Minutes per game	RPG	Rebounds per game
APG	Assists per game	SPG	Steals per game	BPG	Blocks per game	PPG	Points per game
TO	Turnovers per game	FG%	Field-goal percentage	3P%	3-point field-goal percentage	FT%	Free-throw percentage
**Bold**	Career best	°	League leader

=== Regular season ===
Year	Team	GP	GS	MPG	FG%	3P%	FT%	RPG	APG	SPG	BPG	TO	PPG
2016	Minnesota	**12**	0	3.4	.286	.000	.000	0.3	0.2	0.0	0.0	0.3	0.3
2017	Chicago	10	0	**9.2**	**.500**	.000	**.571**	**2.3**	**0.5**	**0.2**	**0.1**	0.6	**2.6**
Career	2 years, 2 teams	22	0	6.0	.448	.000	.571	1.2	0.3	0.1	0.0	0.4	1.4

== Tennessee statistics ==
Legend
GP	Games played	GS	Games started	MPG	Minutes per game
FG%	Field goal percentage	3P%	3-point field goal percentage	FT%	Free throw percentage
RPG	Rebounds per game	APG	Assists per game	SPG	Steals per game
BPG	Blocks per game	PPG	Points per game	**Bold**	Career high

Year	Team	GP	Points	FG%	3P%	FT%	RPG	APG	SPG	BPG	PPG
2012-13	Tennessee	35	**461**	52.2%	0.0%	70.1%	8.0	1.2	**1.4**	0.4	**13.2**
2013-14	Tennessee	35	326	53.5%	0.0%	68.9%	6.8	1.2	0.4	0.2	9.3
2014-15	Tennessee	**36**	382	50.4%	0.0%	**74.0%**	7.0	**2.1**	1.0	**0.5**	10.6
2015-16	Tennessee	33	340	**53.8%**	0.0%	73.7%	**8.3**	1.3	0.9	0.3	10.3
Career		139	1509	52.4%	0.0%	71.6%	7.5	1.5	0.9	0.4	10.9
