= 2016 WNBA draft =

WNBA draft

General information
- Sport: Basketball
- Date: April 14, 2016
- Location: Mohegan Sun Arena, Uncasville, Connecticut
- Networks: ESPN2 (first round); ESPNU (second and third rounds)

Overview
- League: WNBA
- First selection: Breanna Stewart; Seattle Storm

The 2016 WNBA draft is the league's draft for the 2016 WNBA season. It was held on April 14 at Mohegan Sun Arena in Uncasville, Connecticut.

The draft was most notable for Connecticut producing the top three picks, with #1 pick Breanna Stewart followed by Moriah Jefferson and Morgan Tuck. This is the first time in history that the top three draft picks came from the same school.

== Draft lottery ==
The lottery selection to determine the order of the top four picks in the 2016 draft occurred on September 24, 2015. For the first year, team's lottery chances were based on combined records from the 2014 and 2015 WNBA seasons.

=== Lottery chances ===
The 2016 lottery was held on September 24, 2015.

The Seattle Storm won the lottery for the second straight year. This was the third time that the lottery was won by the team that had the highest odds. Seattle Storm held the worst two-year record and was guaranteed at least the third pick for the 2015 draft.

Note: Team selected for the No. 1 pick noted in bold text.

Team	Combined 2014–15 record	Lottery chances	Result
**Seattle Storm**	**22–46**	**44.2%**	**1st pick**
San Antonio Stars	24–44	27.6%	2nd pick
Connecticut Sun	28–40	17.8%	3rd pick
Atlanta Dream	34–34	10.4%	4th pick

== Notable prospects ==
On September 24, 2015, WNBA.com posted notable prospects for the draft. The list included:

- Moriah Jefferson - UConn
- Tiffany Mitchell - South Carolina
- Breanna Stewart - UConn
- Jillian Alleyne - Oregon
- Jonquel Jones - George Washington
- Morgan Tuck - UConn
- Courtney Williams - South Florida

== Draft invitees ==
The WNBA also selected twelve players to be in attendance at the draft. Those twelve were:

- (United States) Rachel Banham, Minnesota
- (United States) Imani Boyette, Texas
- (United States) Kahleah Copper, Rutgers
- (United States) Moriah Jefferson, Connecticut
- (The Bahamas) Jonquel Jones, George Washington
- (United States) Tiffany Mitchell, South Carolina
- (United States) Aerial Powers, Michigan State
- (United States) Breanna Stewart, Connecticut
- (United States) Morgan Tuck, Connecticut
- (United States) Courtney Walker, Texas A&M
- (United States) Talia Walton, Washington
- (United States) Courtney Williams, South Florida

== Key ==
!	Denotes player who has been inducted to the Naismith Basketball Hall of Fame
^	Denotes player who has been inducted to the Women's Basketball Hall of Fame
*	Denotes player who has been selected for at least one All-Star Game and All-WNBA Team
^{+}	Denotes player who has been selected for at least one All-Star Game
**Bold**	Denotes player who won Rookie of the Year

== Draft ==
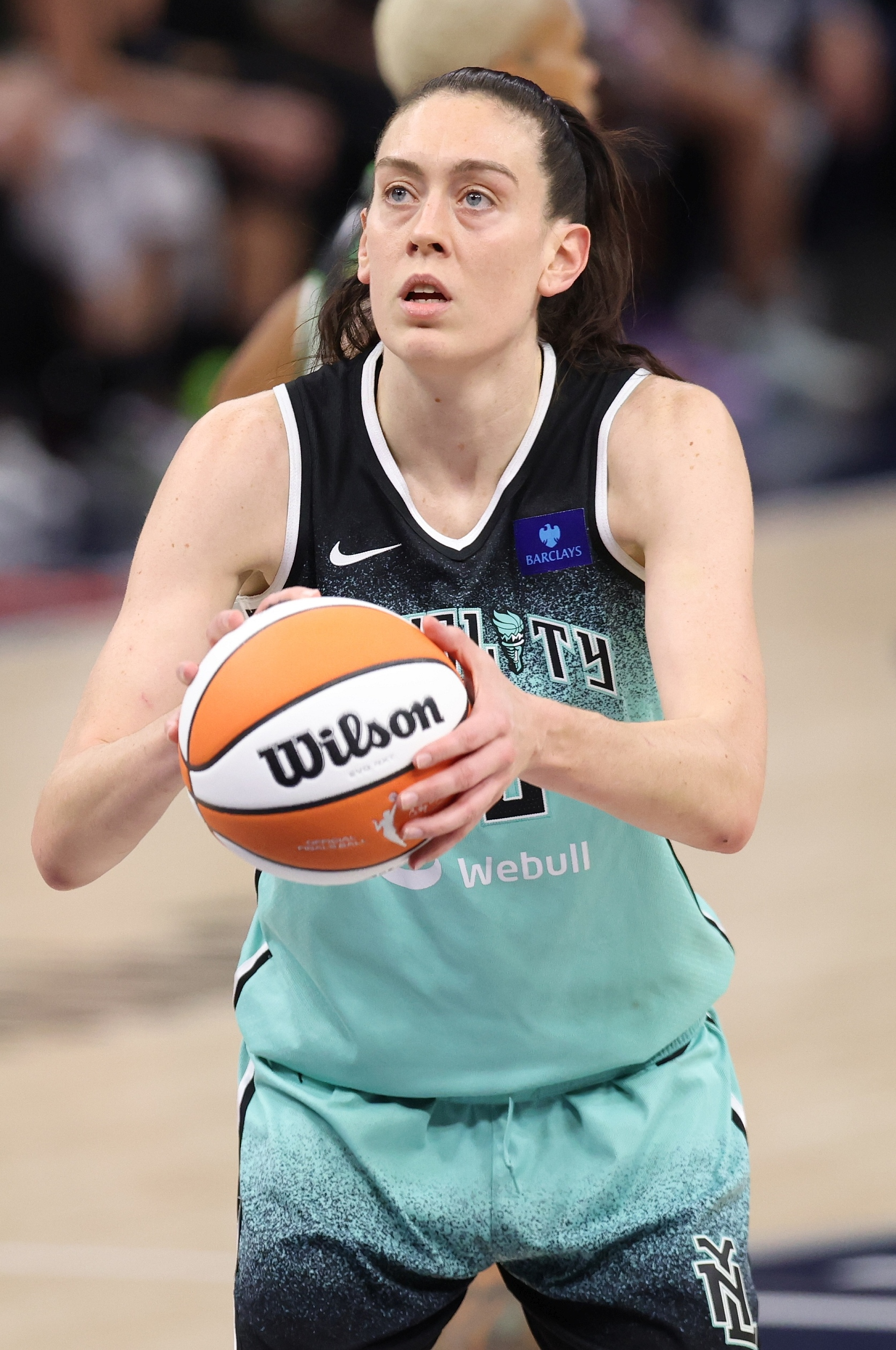
Breanna Stewart was selected 1st overall by the Seattle Storm.

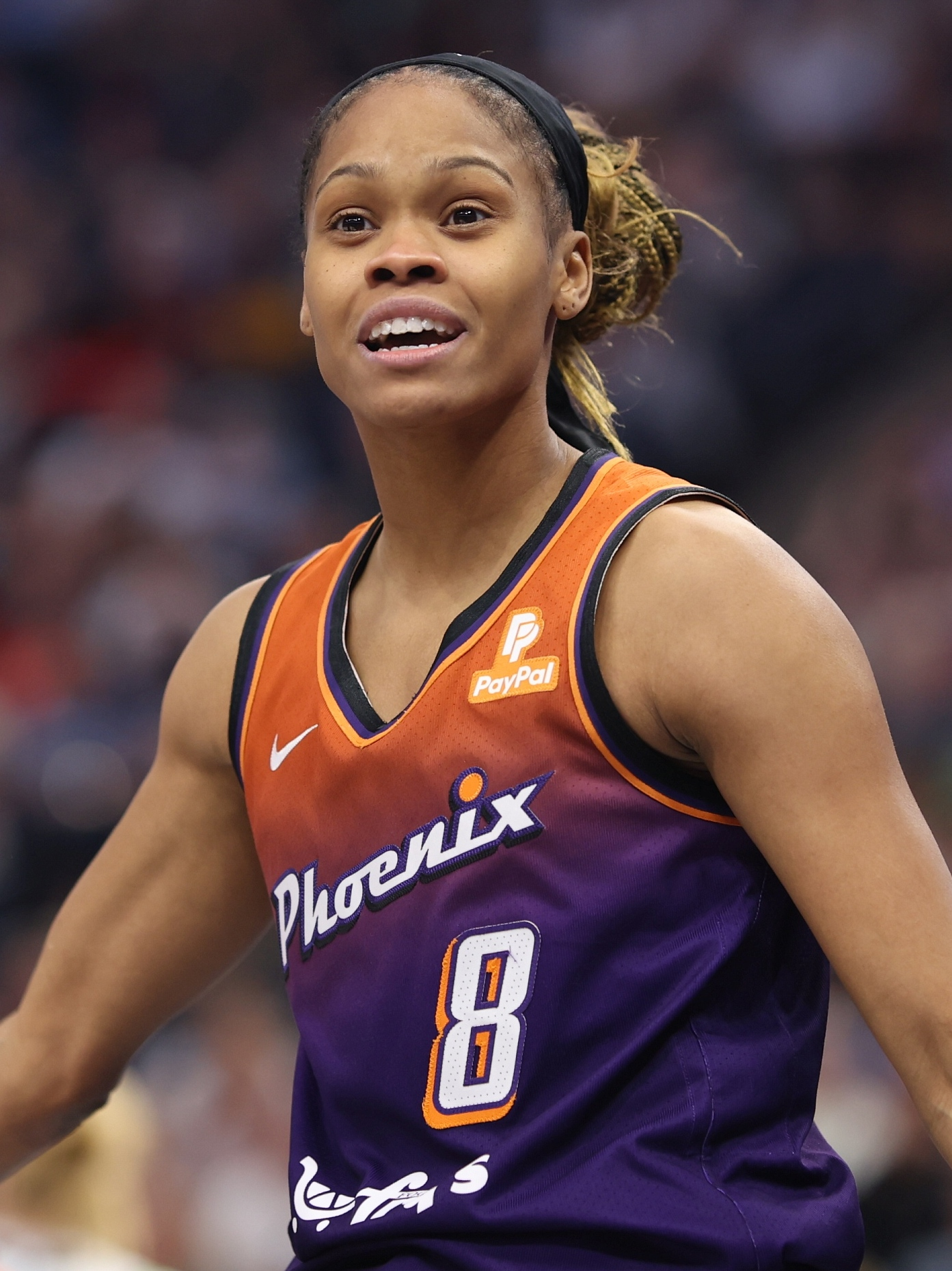
Moriah Jefferson was selected 2nd overall by the San Antonio Stars.

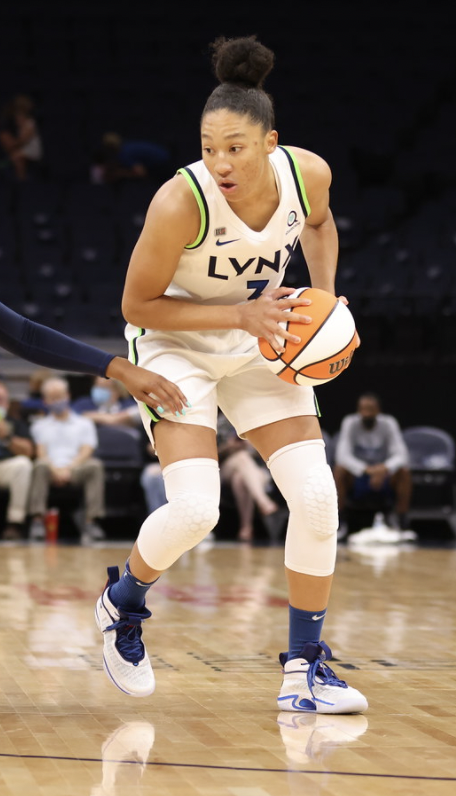
Aerial Powers was selected 5th overall by the Dallas Wings.

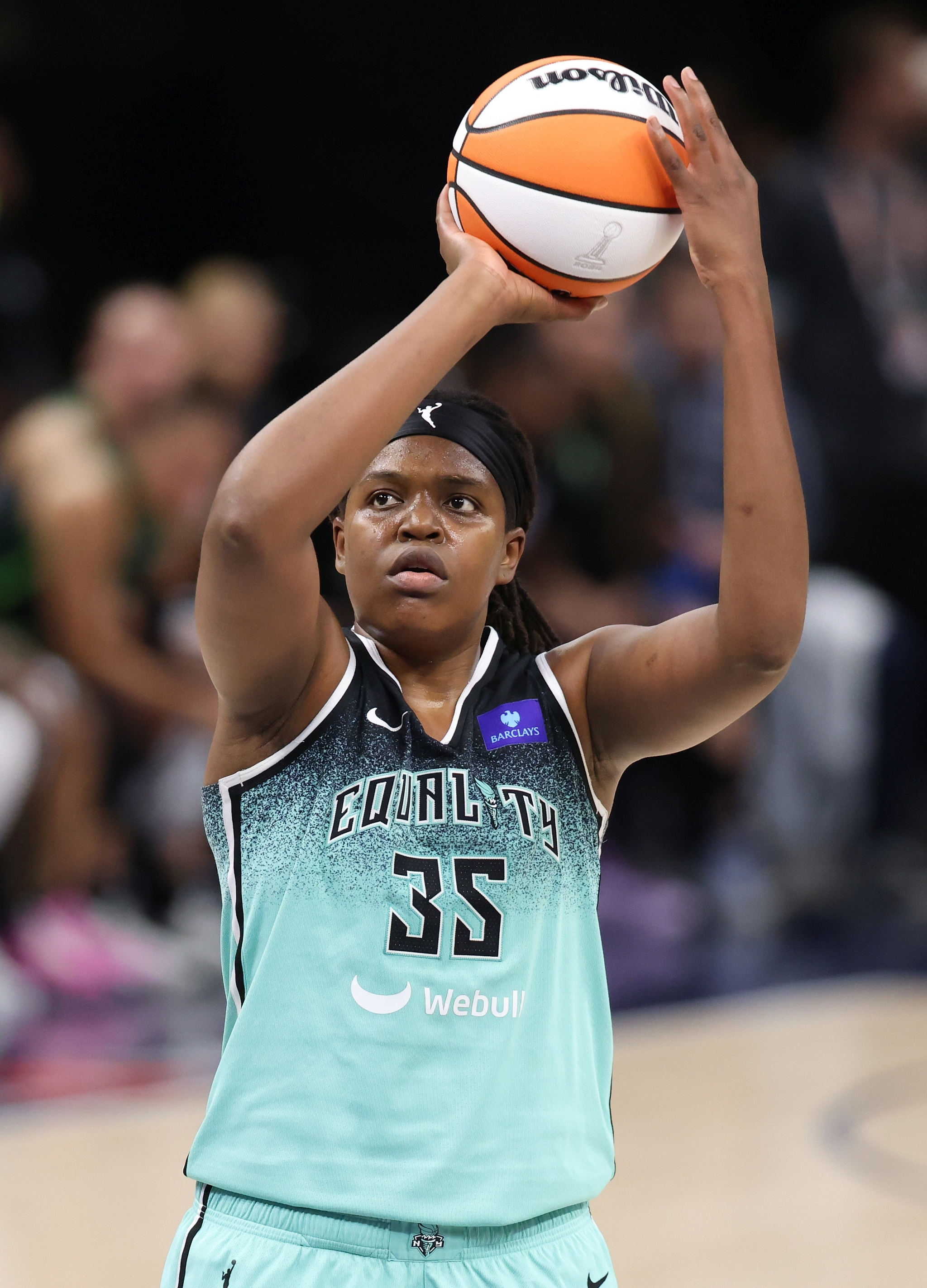
Jonquel Jones was selected 6th overall by the Connecticut Sun.

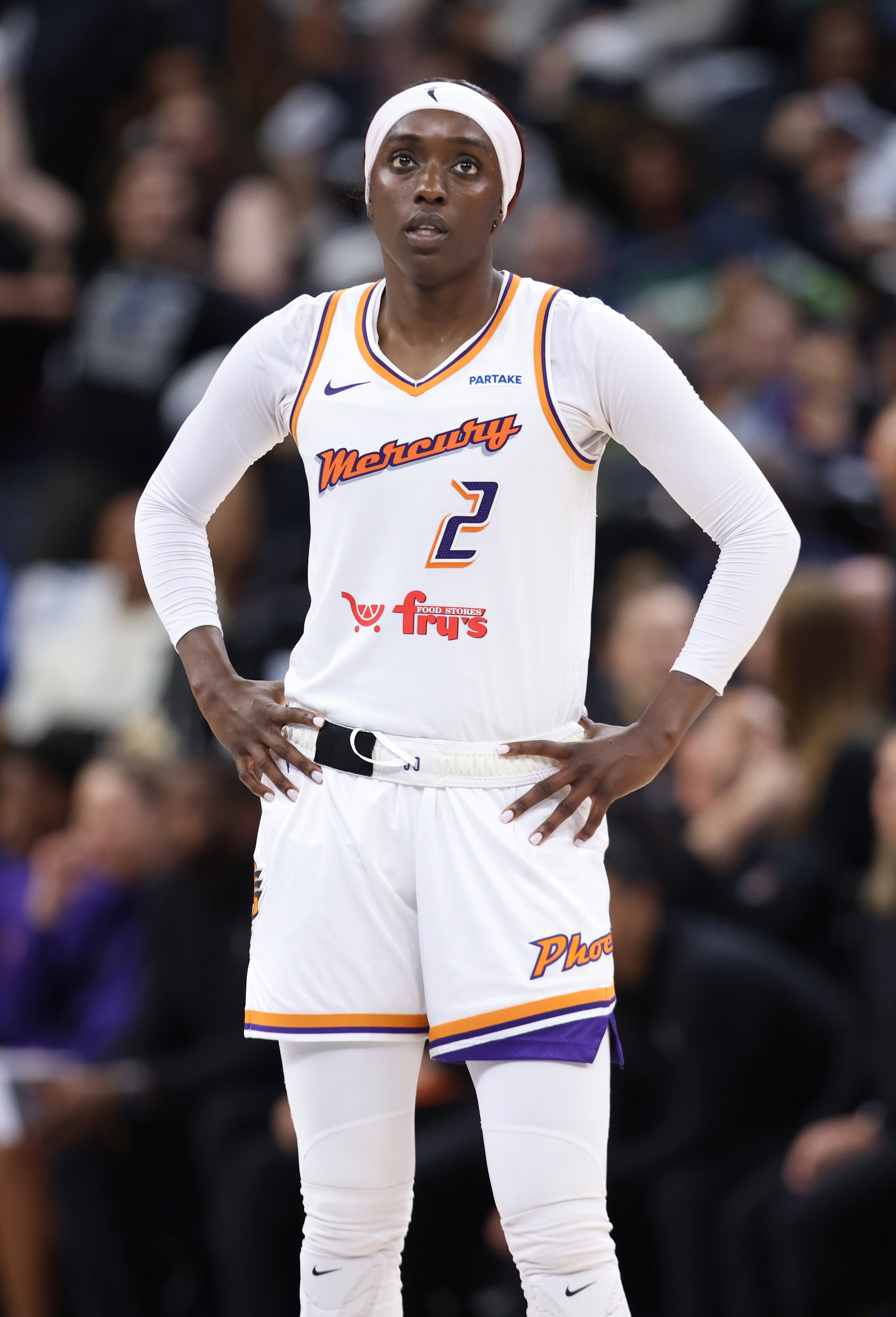
Kahleah Copper was selected 7th overall by the Washington Mystics.

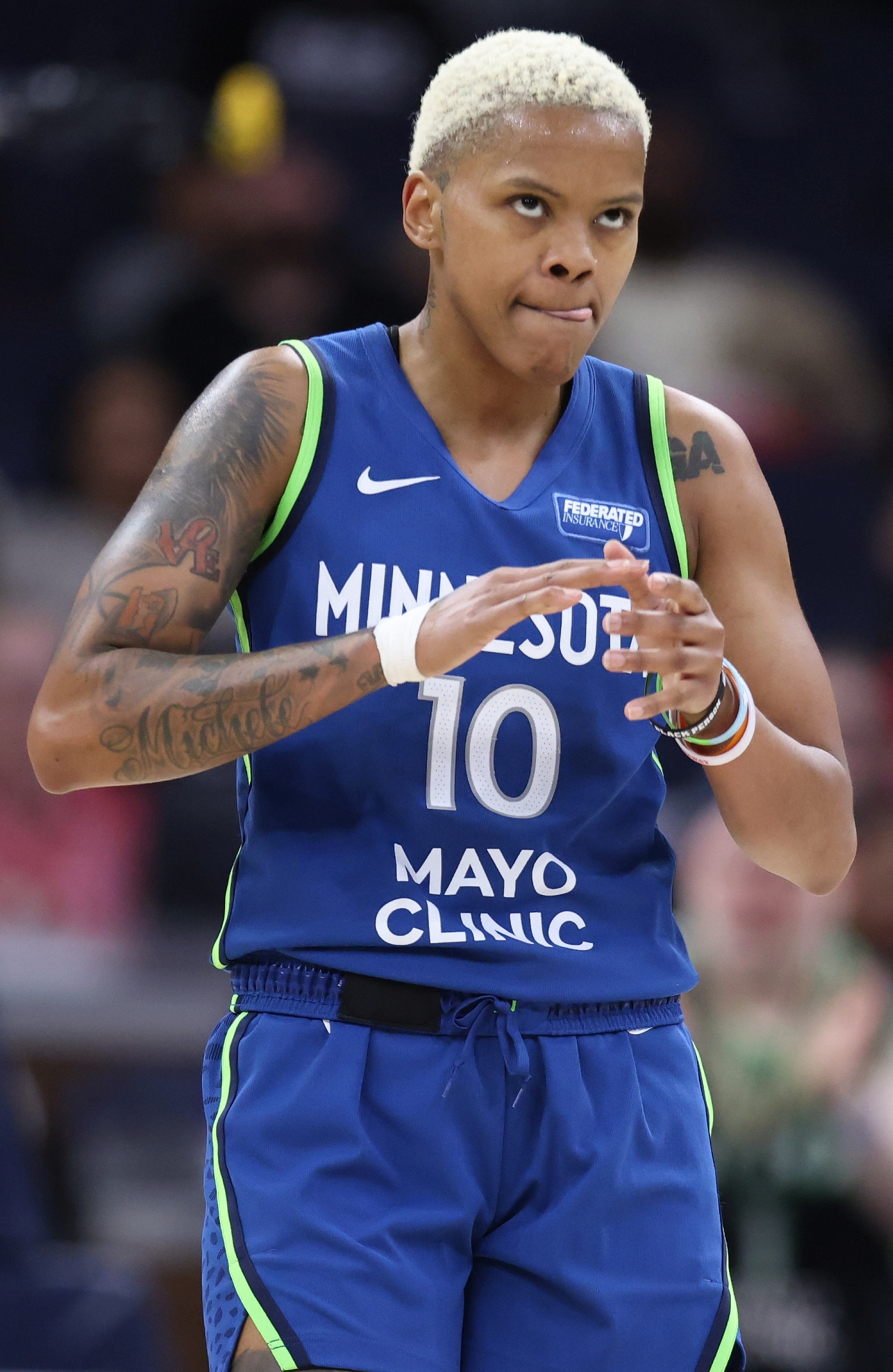
Courtney Williams was selected 8th overall by the Phoenix Mercury.

=== Round 1 ===
Pick	Player	Nationality	Team	School / club team
1	**Breanna Stewart** *	United States	Seattle Storm	Connecticut
2	Moriah Jefferson	United States	San Antonio Stars	Connecticut
3	Morgan Tuck	United States	Connecticut Sun	Connecticut
4	Rachel Banham	United States	Connecticut Sun (from Atlanta) (Note: The Dream traded this pick to Connecticut in exchange for Elizabeth Williams.)	Minnesota
5	Aerial Powers	United States	Dallas Wings (from Los Angeles) (Note: Dallas and Los Angeles traded first-round picks in this draft; Dallas also received Erin Phillips.)	Michigan State
6	Jonquel Jones * (traded to Connecticut)	Bahamas	Los Angeles Sparks (from Dallas) (Note: Los Angeles and Dallas traded first-round picks in this draft; Los Angeles also received Riquna Williams and a 2017 first-round pick.)	George Washington
7	Kahleah Copper *	United States	Washington Mystics	Rutgers
8	Courtney Williams ^{+}	United States	Phoenix Mercury	South Florida
9	Tiffany Mitchell	United States	Indiana Fever	South Carolina
10	Imani Boyette	United States	Chicago Sky	Texas
11	Bria Holmes	United States	Atlanta Dream (from Minnesota) (Note: The Dream received this pick from the Minnesota Lynx as part of a three-way trade involving the Sky: Chicago received Érika de Souza from Atlanta; Atlanta received Damiris Dantas, Reshanda Gray and this pick from Minnesota; Minnesota received Sylvia Fowles and Chicago's second-round pick in this draft)	West Virginia
12	Adut Bulgak	Canada	New York Liberty	Florida State

=== Round 2 ===
Pick	Player	Nationality	Team	School / club team
13	Rachel Hollivay	United States	Atlanta Dream (from San Antonio) (Note: The Dream received this pick from San Antonio in exchange for Samantha Logic.)	Rutgers
14	Jazmon Gwathmey (traded to San Antonio)	United States / Puerto Rico	Minnesota Lynx (from Seattle) (Note: The Lynx received this pick and Renee Montgomery from Seattle in exchange for Monica Wright.)	James Madison
15	Whitney Knight	United States	Los Angeles Sparks (from Connecticut)	Florida Gulf Coast
16	Courtney Walker ^{#}	United States	Atlanta Dream	Texas A&M
17	Jamie Weisner (Note: Weisner was born and raised in the USA to an American mother and Canadian father. At the time of the draft, she had represented Canada internationally at both youth and senior level.)	Canada	Connecticut Sun (from Los Angeles)	Oregon State
18	Ruth Hamblin	Canada	Dallas Wings	Oregon State
19	Lia Galdeira ^{#}	United States	Washington Mystics	Washington State
20	Jillian Alleyne	United States	Phoenix Mercury	Oregon
21	Brene Moseley	United States	Indiana Fever	Maryland
22	Bashaara Graves	United States	Minnesota Lynx (from Chicago) (Note: The Lynx received this pick from Chicago, see note d)	Tennessee
23	Brianna Butler ^{#}	United States	Los Angeles Sparks (from Minnesota via Connecticut) (Note: The Sun received this pick from Minnesota in exchange for the rights to Asjha Jones)	Syracuse
24	Ameryst Alston	United States	New York Liberty	Ohio State

=== Round 3 ===
Pick	Player	Nationality	Team	School / club team
25	Brittney Martin ^{#}	United States	San Antonio Stars	Oklahoma State
26	Lexi Eaton Rydalch ^{#}	United States	Seattle Storm	BYU
27	Aliyyah Handford ^{#}	United States	Connecticut Sun	St. John's
28	Niya Johnson ^{#}	United States	Atlanta Dream	Baylor
29	Talia Walton ^{#}	United States	Los Angeles Sparks	Washington
30	Shakena Richardson ^{#}	United States	Dallas Wings	Seton Hall
31	Danaejah Grant ^{#}	United States	Washington Mystics	St. John's
32	Nirra Fields	Canada	Phoenix Mercury	UCLA
33	Julie Allemand	Belgium	Indiana Fever	Castors Braine (Belgium)
34	Jordan Jones ^{#}	United States	Chicago Sky	Texas A&M
35	Temi Fagbenle	United Kingdom	Minnesota Lynx	USC
36	Shacobia Barbee ^{#}	United States	New York Liberty	Georgia

== See also ==
- List of first overall WNBA draft picks
