= Meighan Simmons =

American–Cambodian basketball player (born 1992)

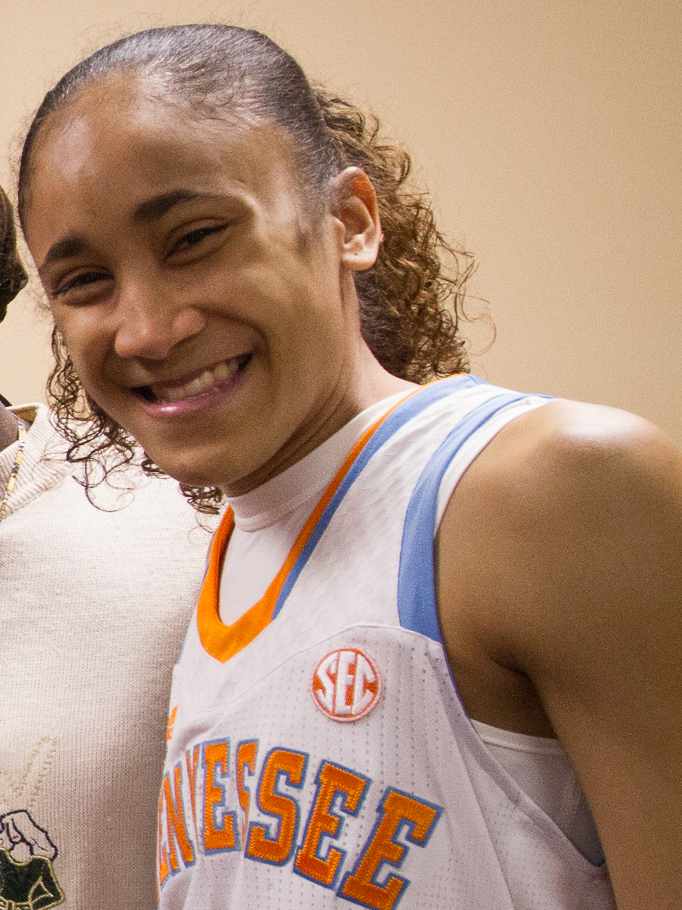

No. 24 – Beşiktaş
- Position: Guard
- League: Turkish Super League

Personal information
- Born: January 25, 1992 (age 34) Fayetteville, North Carolina, U.S.
- Listed height: 5 ft 9 in (1.75 m)
- Listed weight: 128 lb (58 kg)

Career information
- High school: Byron P. Steele (Cibolo, Texas)
- College: Tennessee (2010–2014)
- WNBA draft: 2014: 3rd round, 26th overall pick
- Drafted by: New York Liberty
- Playing career: 2014–present

Career history
- 2014–2015: FCC Baschet UAV Arad
- 2015–2016: PF Umbertide
- 2016–2017: Atlanta Dream
- 2016–2017: Wisła Can-Pack Kraków
- 2017–2018: WBC Sparta&K
- 2018–2019: Sant Adria
- 2019–2020: Maccabi Ra'anana
- 2020–2021: Charnay Basket
- 2021–present: Beşiktaş

Career highlights
- 2× SEC Player of the Year (2013, 2014); Third-team All-American – AP (2013); 2× First-team All-SEC (2013, 2014); SEC Freshman of the Year (2011); SEC All-Freshman Team (2011); McDonald's All-American Game Co-MVP (2010)
- Stats at Basketball Reference

Meighan Sharee Simmons (born January 25, 1992) is a professional basketball Guard. She was selected in the third round of the 2014 WNBA draft, 26th overall. Meighan was born in Fayetteville, North Carolina, but raised in Cibolo, Texas and attended the University of Tennessee. She was nicknamed "Speedy" by legendary Tennessee Women's Basketball coach Pat Summitt. She played overseas in Romania in 2015 for ICIM Arad leading the team in scoring with 16.4 points per game and averaged almost 4 assists and 4 rebounds as well, shooting 55% from the floor and 36% from 3 point range.

== College ==
Simmons played four years of basketball at the University of Tennessee. She was a four-year starter, and was a two-time SEC player of the year award winner.

College Stats:
Freshman— 13.5 pts, 2.8 assists, 2.7 rebounds, 34% 3PT
Sophomore— 11.1 pts, 2.0 assists, 2.3 rebounds, 31% 3PT
Junior— 16.8 pts, 2.7 assists, 3.6 rebounds, 37% 3PT
Senior— 16.5 pts, 2.3 assists, 2.7 rebounds, 36% 3PT

== Career statistics ==
Legend
GP	Games played	GS	Games started	MPG	Minutes per game	RPG	Rebounds per game
APG	Assists per game	SPG	Steals per game	BPG	Blocks per game	PPG	Points per game
TO	Turnovers per game	FG%	Field-goal percentage	3P%	3-point field-goal percentage	FT%	Free-throw percentage
**Bold**	Career best	°	League leader

=== WNBA career statistics ===
==== Regular season ====
Year	Team	GP	GS	MPG	FG%	3P%	FT%	RPG	APG	SPG	BPG	TO	PPG
2016	Atlanta	**25**	0	**5.9**	**28.9**	**28.6**	**83.3**	0.4	**0.3**	**0.1**	0.1	0.4	**3.1**
2017	Atlanta	11	0	3.8	25.0	14.3	71.4	**0.5**	0.1	0.0	0.1	**0.3**	1.7
Career	2 years, 1 team	36	0	5.3	28.1	25.7	78.9	0.4	0.3	0.1	0.1	0.4	2.7

==== Playoffs ====
Year	Team	GP	GS	MPG	FG%	3P%	FT%	RPG	APG	SPG	BPG	TO	PPG
2016	Atlanta	2	0	12.5	10.0	14.3	0.0	1.5	0.5	0.0	0.0	0.0	1.5
Career	1 year, 1 team	2	0	12.5	10.0	14.3	0.0	1.5	0.5	0.0	0.0	0.0	1.5

=== College career statistics ===
Legend
GP	Games played	GS	Games started	MPG	Minutes per game
FG%	Field goal percentage	3P%	3-point field goal percentage	FT%	Free throw percentage
RPG	Rebounds per game	APG	Assists per game	SPG	Steals per game
BPG	Blocks per game	PPG	Points per game	**Bold**	Career high

Year	Team	GP	Points	FG%	3P%	FT%	RPG	APG	SPG	BPG	PPG
2010–11	Tennessee	**37**	500	**41.8**	33.7	74.0	2.7	**2.8**	0.6	0.2	13.5
2011–12	Tennessee	36	398	37.5	31.1	73.5	2.3	1.3	0.8	0.3	11.1
2012–13	Tennessee	35	**589**	41.2	**36.5**	**85.1**	**3.6**	2.1	**1.4**	0.3	**16.8**
2013–14	Tennessee	35	577	41.6	36.0	83.2	2.7	2.3	1.2	0.1	16.5
Career	Tennessee	143	2064	40.7	34.5	79.4	2.8	2.1	1.0	0.2	14.4

== WNBA ==
Simmons was drafted 26th overall of the 2014 WNBA draft by the New York Liberty. On May 12, 2014, Simmons was waived by the Liberty after appearing all three preseason games for the Liberty. On February 20, 2015, Simmons signed with the Seattle Storm. On March 3, 2016, it was announced that Simmons signed with the Atlanta Dream.
