= Liaoning Flying Eagles =

Chinese basketball club

Liaoning Zhongda Aluminium Flying Eagles
- League: Women's Chinese Basketball Association
- History: Liaoning Big Dipper (2002–05); Liaoning Golden Leopards (2005–15); Liaoning Flying Eagles (2015–present)
- Arena: Angang Stadium (since 2016)
- Capacity: 5,000
- Location: Anshan, Liaoning (since 2015)
- Affiliation(s): Liaoning Zhongda Aluminum Co.
- Championships: 4 (2006, 2007, 2009, 2010)

Liaoning Zhongda Aluminium Flying Eagles (simplified Chinese: 辽宁忠大铝业飞鹰; traditional Chinese: 遼寧忠大鋁業飛鷹; pinyin: liáo níng zhōng dà lǚ yè fēi yīng) is a Chinese professional women's basketball club in Liaoning, playing in the Women's Chinese Basketball Association (WCBA). Liaoning Zhongda Aluminum Co. has been the team's corporate sponsor since 2015.

From 2005 to 2015, the team was known as Liaoning Hengye Golden Leopards and sponsored by Liaoning Hengye Group. Before 2005 it was known as Liaoning Big Dipper (辽宁北斗星女篮).

== Season-by-season records ==
Season	Corporate Sponsor	Home City	Final Rank	Record (including playoffs)			Head coach
Season	Corporate Sponsor	Home City	Final Rank	W	L	%	Head coach
Liaoning Big Dipper
2002	Donggang city government	Donggang; Jinzhou	5th	5	7	41.7	(China) Wang Fang
2002–03	Baocheng Real Estate	Tieling	5th	9	10	47.4	(China) Wang Fang
2004	Baocheng Real Estate	Dandong	3rd	9	4	69.2	(China) Li Guangqi
2004–05	Baocheng Real Estate	Dandong	2nd	16	7	69.6	(China) Zhang Bingkuan
Liaoning Hengye Golden Leopards
2005–06	Liaoning Hengye Group	Dandong	Champion	23	7	76.7	(China) Li Guangqi
2007	Liaoning Hengye Group	Anshan	Champion	15	3	73.3	(China) Li Guangqi
2007–08	Liaoning Hengye Group	Anshan	2nd	18	5	78.3	(China) Li Guangqi
2008–09	Liaoning Hengye Group	Anshan	Champion	24	6	80.0	(China) Wang Fang
2009–10	Liaoning Hengye Group	Anshan	Champion	23	8	74.2	(China) Wang Fang; (China) Li Guangqi
2010–11	Liaoning Hengye Group	Anshan	4th	16	10	61.5	(China) Li Guangqi; (China) Li Xiaoyong
2011–12	Liaoning Hengye Group	Anshan	3rd	19	10	65.5	(United States) Bo Overton
2012–13	Dandong Xinyu Real Estate	Dandong	5th	13	11	54.2	(China) Chen Weidong
2013–14	Dandong Xinyu Real Estate	Dandong	6th	13	12	52.0	(China) Liu Yuexiu
2014–15	Liaodong Rural Commercial Bank	Shenyang; Liaoyang	8th	13	19	40.6	(China) Liu Yuexiu
Liaoning Zhongda Flying Eagles
2015–16	Liaoning Zhongda Aluminum	Anshan	8th	13	23	36.1	(China) Liu Yuexiu
2016–17	Liaoning Zhongda Aluminum	Anshan	10th	15	19	44.1	(South Korea) Lee Ho-geun
2017–18	Liaoning Zhongda Aluminum	Anshan	11th	9	17	34.6	(South Korea) Kim Tae-il
2018–19	Liaoning Zhongda Aluminum; Liaoning Qianshan Tourism	Anshan	14th	11	23	32.4	(China) Zheng Xiulin

== Current players ==
2018–19 Liaoning Flying Eagles roster
Players
Coaches

Pos.	No.	Nat.	Name	Ht.	Wt.
C	0	(United States)	Rachel Hollivay	2.03 m (6 ft 8 in)	90 kg (198 lb)
PG	6	(China)	Wang Chengcheng	1.78 m (5 ft 10 in)	69 kg (152 lb)
SG	9	(China)	Xing Jinbo	1.80 m (5 ft 11 in)	68 kg (150 lb)
SG	10	(China)	Liang Jiamei	1.84 m (6 ft 0 in)	75 kg (165 lb)
SF	11	(China)	Zhang Dongxue	1.87 m (6 ft 2 in)	70 kg (154 lb)
F	12	(China)	Cheng Feng	1.90 m (6 ft 3 in)	75 kg (165 lb)
F	13	(China)	Ha Wenxi	1.90 m (6 ft 3 in)	80 kg (176 lb)
PG	15	(China)	Han Mengyi	1.75 m (5 ft 9 in)	60 kg (132 lb)
C	16	(China)	Fu Jinqiu	1.93 m (6 ft 4 in)	80 kg (176 lb)
C	21	(China)	Hu Yueming	1.93 m (6 ft 4 in)	85 kg (187 lb)
PF	23	(China)	Zhu Meiqi	1.90 m (6 ft 3 in)	80 kg (176 lb)
G	24	(China)	Chen Lishu	1.77 m (5 ft 10 in)	65 kg (143 lb)
SG	27	(China)	Wu Shuang	1.80 m (5 ft 11 in)	70 kg (154 lb)
C	34	(United States)	Imani McGee-Stafford	2.01 m (6 ft 7 in)	88 kg (194 lb)

Head coach

- (China) Zheng Xiulin

Assistant coach(es)

- (China) Tian Yu

Legend

- (C) Team captain
- Injured

== Notable former players ==
- (United States) Valerie Muoneke (2004)
- (Australia) Larissa Anderson (2004)
- (United States) Janell Burse (2004–05)
- (United States) Kim Gipson (2005–06)
- (United States) Tangela Smith (2008–09)
- (United States) Kara Braxton (2009–11, 2015–16)
- (United States) Ruth Riley (2011–12)
- (Belarus) Yelena Leuchanka (2012–13)
- (United States) DeMya Walker (2013)
- (United States) Jayne Appel (2013–14)
- (United States) Janel McCarville (2014–15)
- (United States) Kelsey Bone (2016–17)
- (United States) Elizabeth Williams (2017–18)
- (Japan) Kiyomi Fujiu (2010–11)
- (Chinese Taipei) Wei Yu-chun (2017–18)
- (China) Wang Ling (2002–09)
- (China) Chen Xiaoli (2002–13)
- (China) Ma Zengyu (2002–14)
- (China) Zhang Wei (2004–07, 2009–12)
- (China) Zhang Yu (2004–11, 2012–13)
- (China) Yang Banban (2005–06, 2008–14)
