= 2010 McDonald's All-American Girls Game =

West	East
84	75
	1st half	2nd half	Total
West	37	47	84
East	24	51	75
- Date: March 31, 2010
- Venue: Jerome Schottenstein Center, Columbus, Ohio
- MVP: Meighan Simmons, Natasha Howard
- Referees: 1; 2; 3
- Network: ESPNU

McDonald's All-American

The 2010 McDonald's All-American Girls Game was an All-star basketball game played on Wednesday, March 31, 2010, at the Jerome Schottenstein Center in Columbus, Ohio, home of the Ohio State Buckeyes. The game's rosters featured the best and most highly recruited high school girls graduating in 2010. The game was the 9th annual version of the McDonald's All-American Game first played in 2002.

The 48 players were selected from 2,500 nominees by a committee of basketball experts. They were chosen not only for their on-court skills, but for their performances off the court as well. Coach Morgan Wootten, who had more than 1,200 wins as head basketball coach at DeMatha High School, was chairman of the selection committee. Legendary UCLA coach John Wooden, who has been involved in the McDonald's All American Games since its inception, served as chairman of the Games and as an advisor to the selection committee.

Proceeds from the 2010 McDonald's All American High School Basketball Games went to Ronald McDonald House Charities (RMHC) of Central Ohio and its Ronald McDonald House program.

== 2010 game ==
The 2010 game was played at Ohio State University's Jerome Schottenstein Center in Columbus, Ohio on March 31, 2010.

=== 2010 West roster ===
http://www.hoopfeed.com/content/2010/02/11/2010-mcdonalds-all-american-basketball-game-rosters-announced/

ESPNW 100 Rank	#	Name	Height	Weight (lbs.)	Position	Hometown	High School	College Choice
49	5	Aaryn Ellenberg	5-6	118	G	Las Vegas, NV, U.S.	Bishop Gorman High School	Oklahoma
9	34	Karla Gilbert	6-5	208	F	College Station, TX, U.S.	A&M Consolidated High School	Texas A&M
4	3	Chelsea Gray	5-11	165	G	Manteca, CA, U.S.	St. Mary's High School	Duke
6	15	Richa Jackson	6-0	165	F	Midwest City, OK, U.S.	Midwest City High School	Duke
15	4	Afure Jemerigbe	5-11	160	G	Stockton, CA, U.S.	St. Mary's High School	Cal
22	12	Tiffany Moore	5-10	145	F	Frisco, TX, U.S.	Frisco High School	Texas
1	50	Chiney Ogumwike	6-2	170	F	Cypress, TX, U.S.	Cy-Fair High School	Stanford
40	55	Theresa Plaisance	6-5	180	C	Houma, LA, U.S.	Vandebilt Catholic High School	LSU
29	33	Lindsay Sherbert	6-1	155	F	Temecula, CA, U.S.	Great Oak High School	Cal
24	10	Meighan Simmons	5-9	121	G	Cibolo, TX, U.S.	Byron P. Steele II High School	Tennessee
3	30	Odyssey Sims	5-8	145	G	Irving, TX, U.S.	MacArthur High School	Baylor
100	40	Madison Williams	6-7	190	C	Berkley, MI, U.S.	Detroit Country Day School	Michigan State

=== 2010 East roster ===
ESPNW 100 Rank	#	Name	Height	Weight (lbs.)	Position	Hometown	High School	College Choice
57	44	Alicia DeVaughn	6-4	170	C	Pompano Beach, FL, U.S.	Blanche Ely High School	Maryland
39	31	Stefanie Dolson	6-5	230	C	Port Jervis, NY, U.S.	Minisink Valley High School	Connecticut
14	14	Bria Hartley	5-10	150	G	North Babylon, NY, U.S.	North Babylon High School	Connecticut
5	40	Kaneisha Horn	6-1	180	F	Birmingham, AL, U.S.	Ramsay High School	Alabama
2	7	Natasha Howard	6-4	150	F	Toledo, OH, U.S.	Waite High School	Florida State
34	3	Maggie Lucas	5-9	145	G	Narberth, PA, U.S.	Germantown Academy	Penn State
20	21	Kayla McBride	5-11	166	G	Erie, PA, U.S.	Villa Maria Academy	Notre Dame
23	23	Laurin Mincy	6-0	140	G	Newark, NJ, U.S.	University High School	Maryland
30	00	Jennifer O'Neill	5-6	145	G	Bronx, NY, U.S.	Mount Saint Michael Academy	Kentucky
19	33	Haley Peters	6-3	160	F	Red Bank, NJ, U.S.	Peddie School	Duke
21	5	Ronika Ransford	5-8	130	G	Washington, D.C., U.S.	H.D. Woodson Senior High School	Georgia
10	45	Samarie Walker	6-1	195	F	West Carrollton, OH, U.S.	Chaminade-Julienne High School	Connecticut

=== Coaches ===
The West team will be coached by:

- Co-Head Coach Dorena Bingham of East Anchorage High School (Anchorage, Alaska)
- Co-Head Coach Cathy Self-Morgan of Duncanville High School (Duncanville, Texas)
- Asst Coach of ()

The East team will be coached by:

- Co-Head Coach Scott Rodgers of Indian Hill High School (Cincinnati, Ohio)
- Co-Head Coach Dave Schlabach of Hiland High School (Berlin, Ohio)
- Asst Coach of ()

=== Boxscore ===
==== Visitors: West ====
##	Player	FGM/A	3PM/A	FTM/A	Points	Off Reb	Def Reb	Tot Reb	PF	Ast	TO	BS	ST	Min
3	*Chelsea Gray	2/ 8	0/ 2	0/ 2	4	0	4	4	2	4	5	0	5	23
15	*Richa Jackson	5/11	0/ 2	2/ 3	12	5	1	6	0	1	3	2	1	20
33	*Lindsay Sherbert	3/ 6	1/ 4	0/ 1	7	2	3	5	0	0	1	0	2	20
40	*Madison Williams	2/ 5	0/ 1	0/ 0	4	1	12	13	1	3	2	1	1	23
50	*Chiney Ogwumike	6/ 8	0/ 0	2/ 2	14	0	3	3	1	0	2	2	1	20
4	Afure Jemerigbe	0/ 3	0/ 1	1/ 2	1	0	6	6	0	3	4	0	1	17
5	Aaryn Ellenberg	1/ 5	0/ 3	2/ 3	4	0	0	0	0	0	2	0	0	9
10	Meighan Simmons	7/15	1/ 5	6/ 6	21	1	2	3	1	0	4	0	1	14
12	Tiffany Moore	1/ 7	0/ 1	0/ 0	2	2	1	3	1	4	1	0	1	20
30	Odyssey Sims	0/ 0	0/ 0	0/ 0	0	0	0	0	0	0	0	0	0	00
34	Karla Gilbert	5/ 6	1/ 1	4/ 4	15	2	1	3	3	1	1	0	5	18
55	Theresa Plaisance	0/ 3	0/ 0	0/ 0	0	2	3	5	3	0	4	2	0	16
	Team					3	3	6						
	TOTALS	32/ 77	3/20	17/23	84	18	39	57	12	16	29	7	18	200

==== Home: East ====
##	Player	FGM/A	3PM/A	FTM/A	Points	Off Reb	Def Reb	Tot Reb	PF	Ast	TO	BS	ST	Min
3	*Maggie Lucas	1/11	1/ 6	0/ 0	3	0	3	3	0	2	2	0	1	19
7	*Natasha Howard	7/12	3/ 5	3/ 8	20	4	5	9	4	5	3	0	2	24
14	*Bria Hartley	5/14	3/ 7	4/ 4	17	1	2	3	0	0	5	0	5	21
33	*Haley Peters	3/ 7	1/ 2	0/ 0	7	1	2	3	0	2	2	0	0	16
40	*Kaneisha Horn	2/ 6	0/ 0	0/ 0	4	2	5	7	3	1	7	0	2	22
00	Jennifer O'Neill	2/ 3	0/ 1	1/ 2	5	1	0	1	0	2	4	0	0	13
5	Ronika Ransford	1/ 4	0/ 1	0/ 2	2	0	0	0	3	0	2	0	1	10
21	Kayla McBride	1/ 5	0/ 1	0/ 0	2	0	1	1	2	3	0	0	2	15
23	Laurin Mincy	0/ 2	0/ 1	0/ 0	0	1	0	1	0	0	2	0	0	7
31	Stefanie Dolson	6/12	0/ 0	0/ 0	12	4	4	8	4	1	3	1	1	18
44	Alicia DeVaughn	1/ 5	1/ 3	0/ 0	3	1	4	5	0	0	0	1	1	21
45	Samarie Walker	0/ 2	0/ 0	0/ 0	2	1	1	2	2	1	0	0	0	14
	Team					4	4	8						
	TOTALS	29/ 83	9/27	8/16	75	20	31	51	18	17	30	2	15	200

* = Starting Line-up

== All-American Week ==
=== Schedule ===
- Monday, March 29: Powerade JamFest
  - Three-Point Shoot-out
  - Timed Basketball Skills Competition
- Wednesday, March 31: 9th Annual Girls All-American Game

The Powerade JamFest is a skills-competition evening featuring basketball players who demonstrate their skills in two crowd-entertaining ways. The 3-point shooting challenge was first conducted in 1989, and the timed basketball skills competition was added to the schedule of events in 2009.

=== Contest Winners ===
- Maggie Lucas, Penn State Lady Lions signee, was winner of the 2010 3-point shoot-out. She scored 22 points in the final round to win the competition.
- The winner of the basketball skills competition was Chelsea Gray.

== See also ==
- 2010 McDonald's All-American Boys Game
