= Bria Holmes =

American basketball player (born 1994)

Personal information
- Born: April 19, 1994 (age 32) New Haven, Connecticut, U.S.
- Listed height: 6 ft 3 in (1.91 m)
- Listed weight: 170 lb (77 kg)

Career information
- High school: Hillhouse (New Haven, Connecticut)
- College: West Virginia (2012–2016)
- WNBA draft: 2016: 1st round, 11th overall pick
- Drafted by: Atlanta Dream
- Playing career: 2016–present
- Position: Shooting guard

Career history
- 2016–2017: Atlanta Dream
- 2018–2020: Connecticut Sun
- 2021: Los Angeles Sparks
- 2021: Las Vegas Aces

Career highlights
- 3x First-team All-Big 12 (2014–2016); Big 12 All-Freshman Team (2013); 2011-12 McDonald's All American; McDonald's All-American (2012)
- Stats at WNBA.com
- Stats at Basketball Reference

Bria Holmes (born April 19, 1994) is an American professional basketball player who is a free agent in the Women's National Basketball Association (WNBA). She was drafted with the eleventh overall pick in the 2016 WNBA draft. Holmes was the fifth player to be drafted from West Virginia.

== College career ==
Holmes was rated the #1 player in Connecticut by ESPN in the 2012 recruiting class. Over her four years at West Virginia, Holmes scored 2,001 points. She is only the fourth player to reach the 2,000 point mark in Mountaineer history. She averaged 14.5 points per game and 3.5 rebounds per game at West Virginia. Holmes finished her career as the third highest scorer in Mountaineer history, and became only the second Mountaineer to receive all conference first team honors in three straight years. Holmes also finished with three straight years of scoring 500 or more points. The Mountaineers made the NCAA Tournament in three out of the four years Holmes was on the team. In the 2013–14 season, the Mountaineers won the Big 12 regular season title.

=== West Virginia statistics ===
Legend
GP	Games played	GS	Games started	MPG	Minutes per game
FG%	Field goal percentage	3P%	3-point field goal percentage	FT%	Free throw percentage
RPG	Rebounds per game	APG	Assists per game	SPG	Steals per game
BPG	Blocks per game	PPG	Points per game	**Bold**	Career high

Year	Team	GP	Points	FG%	3P%	FT%	RPG	APG	SPG	BPG	PPG
2012–13	West Virginia	31	180	32.3%	20.0%	56.9%	1.6	0.5	0.9	0.5	5.8
2013–14	West Virginia	34	516	46.7%	**34.3%**	65.0%	3.5	1.7	1.4	0.6	15.2
2014–15	West Virginia	**38**	**716**	39.9%	24.1%	62.9%	**4.4**	2.8	**1.5**	**0.9**	**18.8**
2015–16	West Virginia	35	589	**48.5%**	32.4%	**67.9%**	4.1	**3.7**	1.1	0.9	16.8
Career		138	2001	42.8%	28.3%	64.3%	3.5	2.2	1.2	0.7	14.5

== WNBA career ==
Holmes was drafted in the first round, with the eleventh overall pick in the 2016 WNBA draft by the Atlanta Dream. In her first season, Holmes started 10 games and played in 32 with the Dream. She averaged 7.5 points per game and 2.6 rebounds per game. In 2017, Holmes played in all 32 games for the Dream again and started 13. She improved her points per game to 7.8. Prior to the 2018 season, Holmes was traded to the Connecticut Sun for a second round pick in the 2018 WNBA draft and a second round pick in the 2019 WNBA draft. Prior to this trade, Holmes had announced that she would miss the 2018 season due to pregnancy.

=== WNBA career statistics ===
Legend
GP	Games played	GS	Games started	MPG	Minutes per game	RPG	Rebounds per game
APG	Assists per game	SPG	Steals per game	BPG	Blocks per game	PPG	Points per game
TO	Turnovers per game	FG%	Field-goal percentage	3P%	3-point field-goal percentage	FT%	Free-throw percentage
**Bold**	Career best	°	League leader

==== Regular season ====
Year	Team	GP	GS	MPG	FG%	3P%	FT%	RPG	APG	SPG	BPG	TO	PPG
2016	Atlanta	33	10	21.3	**.435**	.274	**.774**	2.6	1.2	**0.9**	0.2	1.2	7.5
2017	Atlanta	32	**13**	**22.2**	.378	.189	.640	**2.9**	**1.8**	0.7	0.2	1.1	**7.8**
2019	Connecticut	**34**	0	15.6	.399	.317	.672	1.4	0.9	0.5	0.2	0.9	6.3
2020	Connecticut	18	4	16.2	.357	**.333**	.667	1.8	1.1	0.7	0.3	1.0	4.9
2021	Los Angeles	17	5	18.4	.326	.242	.565	2.8	1.2	**0.9**	**0.4**	1.2	4.9
2021	Las Vegas	2	0	3.0	.000	—	—	1.0	0.0	0.0	0.0	**0.5**	0.0
Career	6 years, 4 teams	136	32	18.8	.388	.270	.676	2.3	1.2	0.7	0.2	1.1	6.5

==== Playoffs ====
Year	Team	GP	GS	MPG	FG%	3P%	FT%	RPG	APG	SPG	BPG	TO	PPG
2016	Atlanta	2	**2**	**35.0**	**.500**	**.286**	.625	**5.5**	**2.5**	0.5	**0.5**	2.0	**15.5**
2019	Connecticut	**8**	0	13.6	.386	.200	**.778**	1.5	1.0	**0.9**	0.1	**1.0**	5.5
Career	2 years, 2 teams	10	2	17.9	.426	.227	.706	2.3	1.3	0.8	0.2	1.2	7.5
