= Aerial Powers =

American basketball player (born 1994)

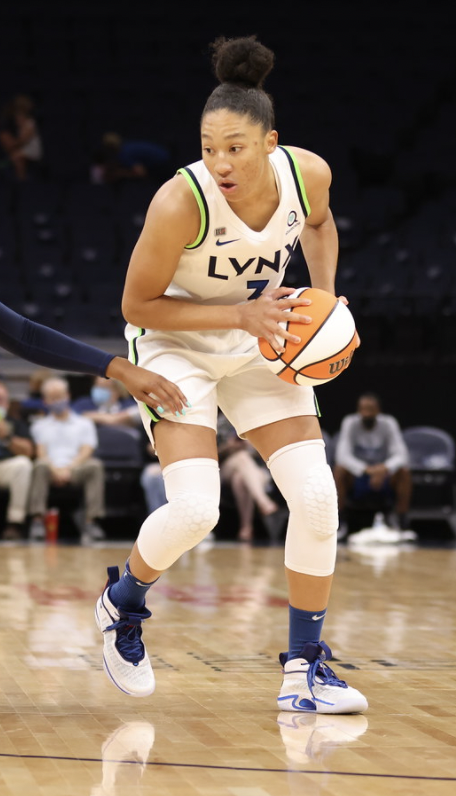
- Powers in 2021

No. 23 – Indiana Fever
- Position: Small forward / shooting guard
- League: Israeli League

Personal information
- Born: January 17, 1994 (age 32) Detroit, Michigan, U.S.
- Listed height: 5 ft 11 in (1.80 m)
- Listed weight: 170 lb (77 kg)

Career information
- High school: Detroit Country Day (Detroit, Michigan)
- College: Michigan State (2013–2016)
- WNBA draft: 2016: 1st round, 5th overall pick
- Drafted by: Dallas Wings
- Playing career: 2016–present

Career history
- 2016–2018: Dallas Wings
- 2017–2018: Fenerbahçe S.K.
- 2018–2020: Washington Mystics
- 2019–2020: Guangdong Vermilion Birds
- 2021–2023: Minnesota Lynx
- 2024: Beijing Great Wall
- 2024: Atlanta Dream
- 2024–2025: Kayseri Basketbol
- 2025: Golden State Valkyries
- 2025: Indiana Fever
- 2025: Çanakkale Belediyespor
- 2026–: Elitzur Ramla

Career highlights
- WNBA champion (2019); WNBA All-Rookie Team (2016); Third-team All-American – AP (2016); 3× First-team All-Big Ten (2014–2016); Big Ten All-Defensive Team (2015); Big Ten All-Freshman Team (2014)
- Stats at WNBA.com
- Stats at Basketball Reference
Medals
Representing United States
Women's basketball
2015 Summer Universiade
Gold medal – first place	2015 Gwangju
Women's 3x3 basketball
FIBA 3x3 AmeriCup
Silver medal – second place	2026 San Salvador

Aerial Leann Powers (born January 17, 1994) is an American professional basketball player who last played for the Indiana Fever of the Women's National Basketball Association (WNBA). She played college basketball for the Michigan State Spartans. She was drafted by the Dallas Wings with the fifth overall pick in the 2016 WNBA draft.

== Early life ==
Powers was born in Detroit, Michigan to Juan and Cecelia Powers. She has a younger brother named Juan Jr. Powers. Before playing basketball, Powers participated in boxing at a young age.

Powers is openly lesbian.

Powers was a 2012 graduate of Detroit Country Day. During her high school career, Powers led her school team to four consecutive regional championships. Upon graduation, Powers accepted a basketball scholarship at Michigan State University.

== College career ==
Powers attended Michigan State University for four seasons. Powers couldn't play for Michigan State in her first year due to a torn achilles tendon that she suffered in practice before the season started. In her second year, Powers came back healthy and averaged 13.8 points per game in her first season for Michigan State. During her first season, Powers had 26 points and 18 rebounds against Hampton University in the first round of the NCAA Tournament, which was the third-most points scored by a Michigan State Spartan in the NCAA Tournament, while her rebounding performance broke Michigan State's NCAA Tournament single-game record. By the end of her first season, Powers was named to the All-Big Ten First Team, becoming the first Michigan State freshman to ever be named to the First Team. She was also named to the Big Ten All-Freshman Team and was a co-recipient for both Michigan State's Player of the Year and Spartan Hustle award. In her second season with Michigan State, Powers had the best year of her college career, averaging 21.9 points and 12.1 rebounds per game. During the season, she had 24 double-doubles, which tied her for first on the All-Big Ten First Team and was the third-most in the NCAA. In her final season with Michigan State, Powers averaged 21.8 points and 9.2 rebounds per game. In February 2016, Power earned espnW player of the week honors following her career-high 40 points (on 14–26 field goal shooting) along with 8 rebounds and 6 assists in a 114–106 win against Minnesota. By the end of the season, she was named to the All-American Third Team and the All-Big Ten First Team for the third time. Following her senior season, Powers entered the 2016 WNBA draft.

== USA Basketball ==
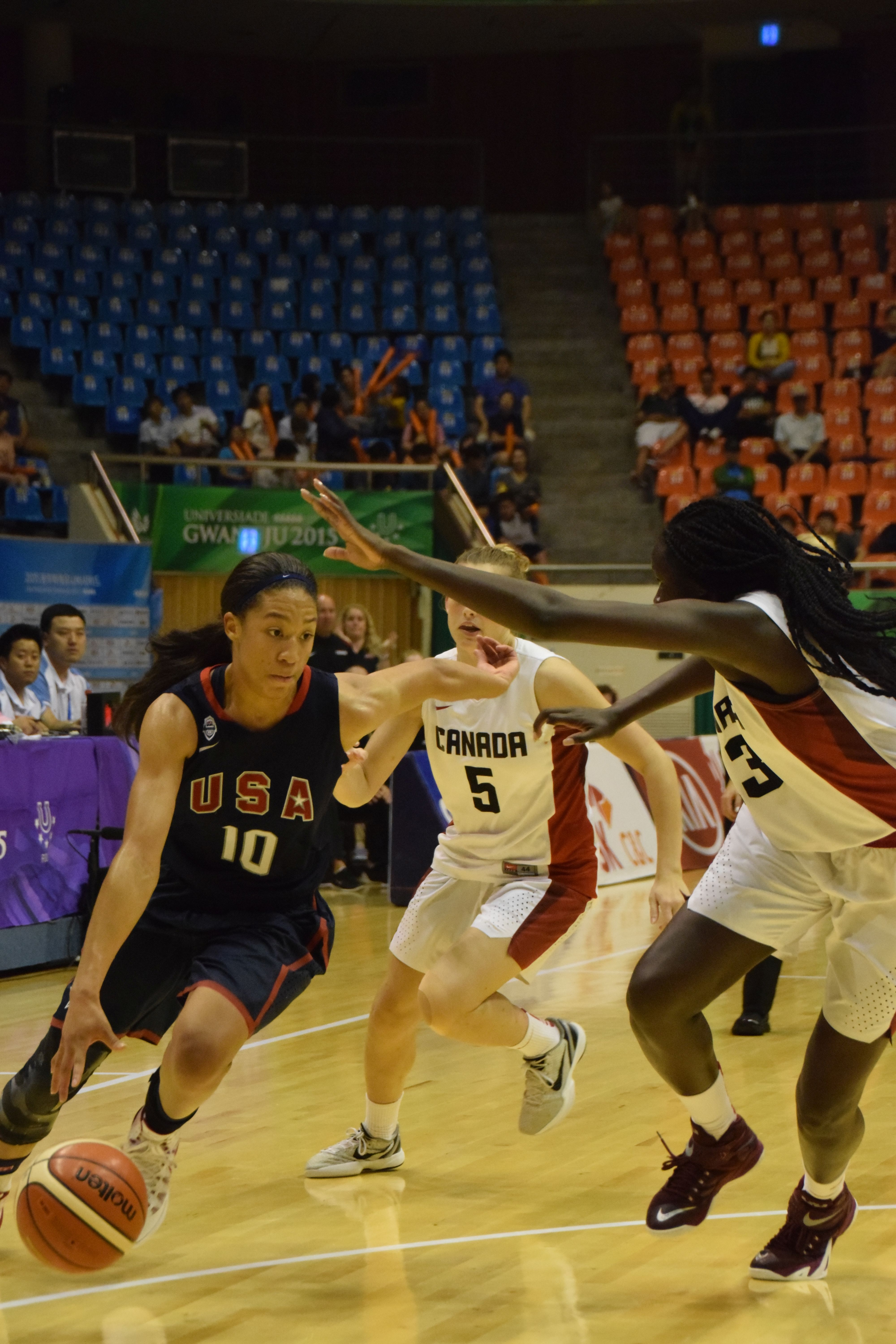
Aerial Powers driving in the World University gold medal game against Canada

Powers was selected to be a member of Team USA at the World University Games held in Seoul, South Korea from July 5–13, 2015. The team won all six games, including the championship game against Canada. For the first three quarters, the game was quite close with four ties and four lead changes. In the fourth quarter, the USA exploded for 34 points to pull out to a large lead, and won the gold medal with a score of 82–63. Powers was the leading scorer for the USA team, averaging 18 points per game.

== Professional career ==
=== WNBA ===
==== Dallas Wings (2016–2018) ====
In 2016, Powers signed an endorsement deal with Nike. Powers was drafted 5th overall by the Dallas Wings in the 2016 WNBA draft. In her rookie season, Powers came off the bench and was effective on the Wings' second unit, averaging 10.4 points per game in 32 games with 2 starts. In a loss to the Washington Mystics, she put up career-highs in both scoring and rebounding with 21 points and 10 rebounds. It was also her first career double-double. She was named to the WNBA All-Rookie Team by the end of the season.

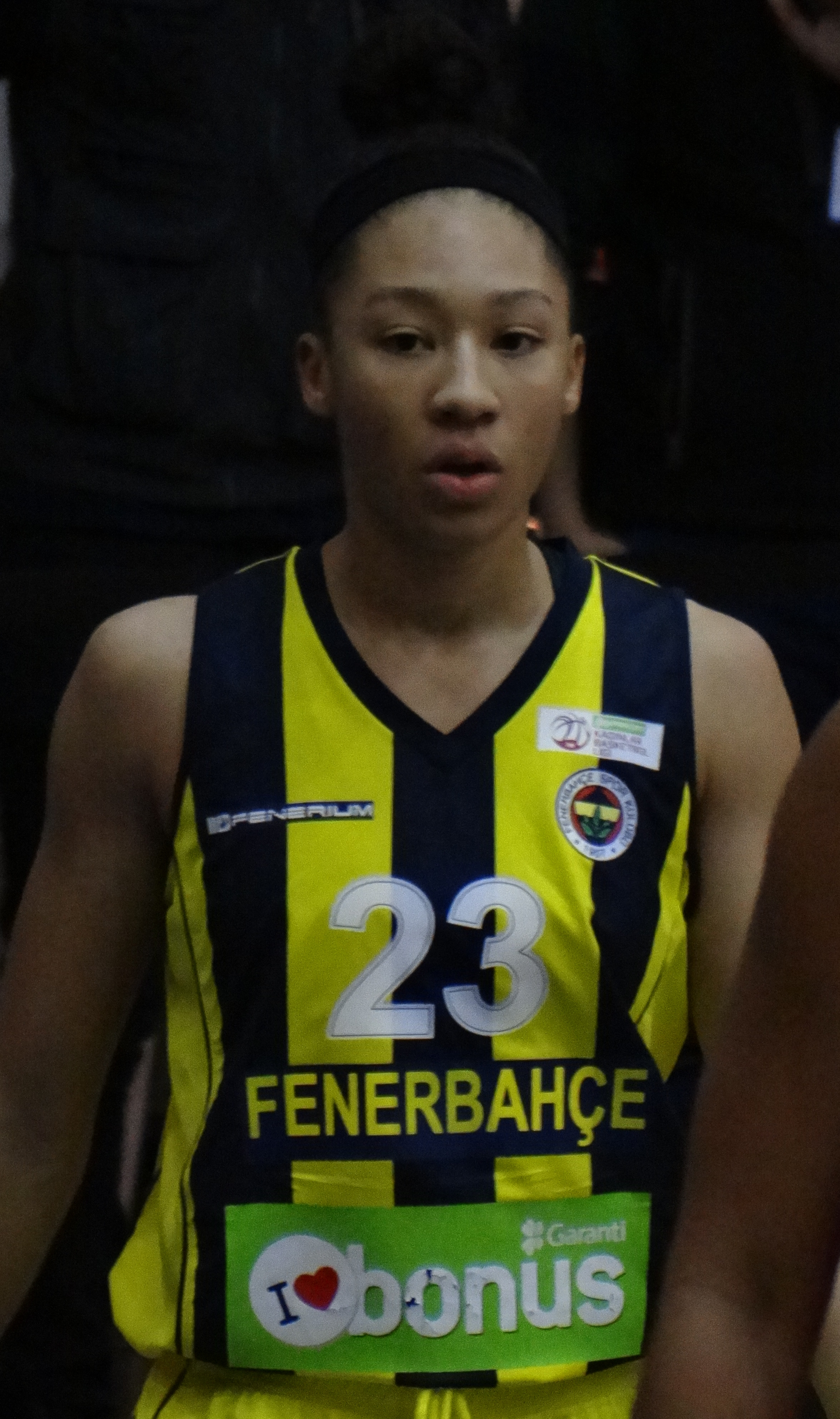
Powers in Fenerbahçe uniform in 2018

Midway through the 2017 WNBA season on July 25, Powers made her return after recovering from hip surgery, scoring 9 points in 18 minutes off the bench in an 84–82 victory over the Indiana Fever. 2 games later, Power made her first and only start of the season for the Wings and scored a new career-high of 23 points in a 95–74 loss to the Los Angeles Sparks. The Wings finished as the number 7 seed in the league with a 16–18 record but lost to the Washington Mystics in the first-round elimination game, where Powers scored 21 points off the bench.

On July 18, 2018, Powers scored a season-high 18 points in a 101–72 victory against the Phoenix Mercury.

==== Washington Mystics (2018–2020) ====
On July 24, 2018, Powers was traded to the Washington Mystics in exchange for Tayler Hill and draft picks. The Mystics finished as the number three seed with a 22–12 record, receiving a bye to the second round elimination game. There, the Mystics would defeat the Los Angeles Sparks 96–64. In the semi-finals, the Mystics defeated the number 2 seed Atlanta Dream in a five-game series, advancing to the WNBA Finals for the first time in franchise history. In the Finals, the Mystics were swept by the Seattle Storm.

In 2019, Powers would have the best season of her career thus far. On July 7, 2019, Powers scored a new career-high 24 points in a 98–81 loss to the Los Angeles Sparks. By the end of the season, Powers finished with a career-high in scoring, helping the Mystics to a league-best 26–8 record. As the number 1 seed, the Mystics would receive a double-bye to the semi-finals. There, the Mystics defeated the Las Vegas Aces in four games to advance to the WNBA Finals for the second year in a row. In the WNBA Finals, the Mystics would come out victorious as they defeated the Connecticut Sun in five games, earning Powers her first WNBA championship.

In 2020, the season was delayed and shortened to 22 games in a bubble at IMG Academy due to the COVID-19 pandemic. With the Mystics' star player Elena Delle Donne sitting out the season for health concerns after being diagnosed as a "high risk player", Powers would be inserted into the starting lineup. On July 28, 2020, Powers scored a new career-high 27 points in a 94–89 victory over the Connecticut Sun. On August 7, 2020, Powers suffered a hamstring injury in a game against the New York Liberty and would be sidelined for the rest of the season. Prior to her season-ending injury, Powers was averaging new career-highs in scoring, assists, steals and rebounds with her increased playing time. The Mystics struggled to defend their title, as their roster was depleted with several key players from their 2019 championship run leaving in free agency. They finished the season 9–13 with the number 8 seed but were eliminated by the Phoenix Mercury in the first-round elimination game.

==== Minnesota Lynx (2021–2023) ====
In 2021, Powers became an unrestricted free agent and signed with the Minnesota Lynx.

==== Atlanta Dream (2024) ====
On January 31, 2024, Powers signed a one-year deal with the Atlanta Dream.

==== Golden State Valkyries (2025) ====
On June 10, 2025, Powers signed with the Golden State Valkyries. On June 25, she was waived by the Valkyries.

==== Indiana Fever (2025) ====
On August 23, 2025, Powers signed a 7-day hardship contract with the Indiana Fever. On September 6, the Fever announced that Powers had signed a rest-of-season contract with the team.

=== Overseas ===
During her rookie season, Powers signed with Bucheon KEB Hana Bank, a South Korean club for the 2016–17 off-season. However, she ended up not playing for the team due to a tear on her hip labrum that she sustained towards the end of the 2016 WNBA season. She underwent hip surgery and was ruled out for the off-season with an estimated recovery period of 4–6 months, In 2017, Powers signed with Fenerbahçe S.K. of the Turkish Super League for the 2017–18 off-season. In 2019, Powers signed with Guangdong Vermilion Birds of the Chinese League for the 2019–20 off-season.

On November 2026, Powers signed with Elitzur Ramla from Israeli League for the 2026–27 off-season.

== Career statistics ==
Legend
GP	Games played	GS	Games started	MPG	Minutes per game	RPG	Rebounds per game
APG	Assists per game	SPG	Steals per game	BPG	Blocks per game	PPG	Points per game
TO	Turnovers per game	FG%	Field-goal percentage	3P%	3-point field-goal percentage	FT%	Free-throw percentage
**Bold**	Career best	°	League leader

†	Denotes seasons in which Powers won a WNBA championship

=== WNBA ===
==== Regular season ====
Stats current through end of 2025 season

WNBA regular season statistics
Year	Team	GP	GS	MPG	FG%	3P%	FT%	RPG	APG	SPG	BPG	TO	PPG
2016	Dallas	32	2	19.2	.394	.368	.835	2.7	1.1	1.0	0.2	1.5	10.4
2017	Dallas	12	1	20.3	.339	.310	.818	4.2	1.5	0.4	**0.5**	1.5	10.8
2018	Dallas	15	0	15.4	.366	.179	.824	2.5	0.9	0.5	0.1	1.6	6.2
2018	Washington	9	0	12.7	.450	**.438**	**1.000**	3.2	0.9	0.7	0.4	0.8	6.1
2019^{†}	Washington	30	7	19.8	.434	.362	.867	3.2	1.5	0.8	0.2	1.4	11.4
2020	Washington	6	6	**29.8**	**.464**	.346	.833	**4.8**	2.5	**1.5**	0.0	1.8	**16.3**
2021	Minnesota	14	7	22.1	.427	.314	.917	3.6	2.1	0.4	0.4	2.9	13.4
2022	Minnesota	**35**	**31**	26.9	.385	.308	.815	4.7	**2.9**	1.2	0.3	2.5	14.4
2023	Minnesota	20	0	9.8	.413	.316	.917	1.8	0.8	0.2	0.1	0.9	5.2
2024	Atlanta	17	2	17.9	.355	.389	.791	3.3	1.4	0.9	0.2	1.1	8.6
2025	Golden State	2	0	16.7	.000	—	**1.000**	1.0	0.5	0.5	0.0	**0.0**	1.0
2025	Indiana	8	0	20.0	.429	.368	.647	4.6	2.4	0.9	0.1	1.4	9.0
**Career**	10 years, 6 teams	200	56	19.5	.398	.337	.839	3.4	1.6	0.8	0.2	1.7	10.3

==== Playoffs ====
WNBA playoff statistics
Year	Team	GP	GS	MPG	FG%	3P%	FT%	RPG	APG	SPG	BPG	TO	PPG
2017	Dallas	1	0	23.9	.400	.333	.889	**6.0**	3.0	**2.0**	0.0	**0.0**	21.0
2018	Washington	**9**	0	10.0	.341	.000	**1.000**	2.3	0.3	0.3	**0.3**	0.7	5.1
2019^{†}	Washington	**9**	0	16.3	.451	.263	.895	3.3	1.0	0.2	0.2	0.7	7.6
2021	Minnesota	1	1	**32.0**	**.476**	**.500**	**1.000**	5.0	**4.0**	**2.0**	0.0	6.0°	**24.0**
2023	Minnesota	1	0	14.0	.000	.000	**1.000**	3.0	0.0	1.0	0.0	3.0	4.0
2024	Atlanta	Did not play											
2025	Indiana	8	0	10.4	.227	.000	.545	1.5	0.3	0.4	0.1	0.6	2.0
**Career**	7 years, 5 teams	29	1	13.4	.372	.200	.871	2.7	0.7	0.4	0.2	1.0	6.2

=== College ===
NCAA statistics
Year	Team	GP	GS	MPG	FG%	3P%	FT%	RPG	APG	SPG	BPG	TO	PPG
2013–14	Michigan State	**33**	**33**	26.1	**.477**	**.317**	.709	8.2	2.3	1.8	0.6	3.9	13.4
2014–15	Michigan State	31	31	**35.5**	.397	.303	.783	**12.1**	**3.5**	**2.2**	**1.2**	**5.0**	**21.9**
2015–16	Michigan State	32	30	32.8	.444	.312	**.830**	9.2	2.9	2.0	0.7	3.3	21.8
**Career**		96	94	31.4	.433	.309	.779	9.8	2.9	2.0	0.8	4.1	18.9

== Streaming ==
Powers also streams, playing in a Team Liquid Pro-Am Valorant tournament in early 2020. In January 2021, she was signed as a brand ambassador and streamer by Team Liquid, and appointed chair of its Diversity & Inclusion Task Force.
