= 2012 McDonald's All-American Girls Game =

2011 basketball game in Chicago, Illinois, USA

East	West
78	79
	1st half	2nd half	Total
East	40	39	79
West	31	47	78
- Date: March 28, 2012
- Venue: United Center, Chicago, Illinois
- MVP: Alexis Prince
- Referees: Abby Bickle; Jenene Pence; Jennifer Washo
- Network: ESPNU
- Announcers: Lou Canellis (play–by–play); Abby Waner (color commentator)

McDonald's All-American

The 2012 McDonald's All-American Girls Game is an All-star basketball game that was played on March 28, 2011, at the United Center in Chicago, Illinois, home of the Chicago Bulls. The game's rosters featured the best and most highly recruited high school girls graduating in 2012. The game is the 11th annual version of the McDonald's All-American Game first played in 2002. The West team won 79–78.

== 2012 Game ==
The East team dominated the first half, achieving a lead of 16 points at one time. The West team fought back, but still trailed by eleven points at the half. In the second half, the West team continued to cut into the lead, and a layup by Morgan Tuck produced a tie at 50 points each early in the second half. Tuck ended the game with 18 points, but West's Nirra Fields, the first player ever to make a McDonald's All-American roster from Canada, ended the game with 20 points to lead all scorers. However, the West was unable to take the lead. The score was tied at 78 all, when East held for a final shot by Alexis Prince, but the shot did not go in and the buzzer sounded. The players headed to their benches, expecting to get ready for the first ever overtime in a McDonald's girls game. However, a late whistle had been blown and the referees decided that a foul on Bashaara Graves had occurred before the end of regulation. Three tenths of a second were put back on the game clock, and Graves went to the line with a one-and-one opportunity. She hit the first, and missed the second, but there was not enough time left for a subsequent play, so the East held on for the 79–78 win. Bashaara Graves was named the Tournament MVP.

=== 2012 East Roster ===
ESPNW 100 Rank	Name	Height	Position	Hometown	High school	College choice
14	Brianna Butler	5–11	G	Brooklyn, New York	Nazareth Regional	Syracuse
18	Kahleah Copper	6–1	G	Philadelphia, Pennsylvania	Prep Charter	Rutgers
5	Bashaara Graves	6–2	F	Clarksville, Tennessee	Clarksville (TN)	Tennessee
29	Bria Holmes	6–1	W	Hamden, Connecticut	Hillhouse	West Virginia
8	Malina Howard	6–3	P	Twinsburg, Ohio	Twinsburg	Maryland
43	Niya Johnson	5–7	PG	Gainesville, Florida	P.K. Yonge	Baylor
33	Michaela Mabrey	5–9	G	Manasquan, New Jersey	Manasquan	Notre Dame
	Sierra Moore	5–11	W	McSherrytown, Pennsylvania	Delone Catholic	Duke
16	Alexis Prince	6–1	W	Orlando, Florida	Edgewater	Baylor
1	Breanna Stewart	6–3	F	Cicero, New York	Cicero–North Syracuse	Connecticut
31	Brittney Sykes	5–9	G	Newark, New Jersey	University	Syracuse
36	Janee Thompson	5–7	PG	Chicago, Illinois	Whitney Young	Kentucky

=== 2012 West Roster ===
ESPNW 100 Rank	Name	Height	Position	Hometown	High school	College choice
7	Jordan Adams	6–1	G	Santa Ana, California	Mater Dei (CA)	USC
35	Candice Agee	6-6	P	Silverado, California	Silverado (Victorville, CA)	Penn State
22	Katie Collier	6–3	P	SeaTac, Washington	Seattle Christian	Washington
12	Nirra Fields	5–9	G	Santa Ana, California	Mater Dei	UCLA
2	Moriah Jefferson	5–7	PG	Glenn Heights, Texas	T.H.E.S.A.	Connecticut
3	Alexis Jones	5–8	PG	Irving, Texas	MacArthur (Irving, TX)	Duke
15	Jordan Jones	5–6	PG	DeSoto, Texas	DeSoto (TX)	Texas A&M
44	Jewell Loyd	5–9	G	Lincolnwood, Illinois	Niles West	Notre Dame
26	Xylina McDaniel	6–2	F	Columbia, South Carolina	Spring Valley (SC)	North Carolina
11	Imani Stafford	6–7	P	Los Angeles, California	Windward	Texas
6	Morgan Tuck	6–2	F	Bolingbrook, Illinois	Bolingbrook	Connecticut
10	Courtney Williams	6–1	W	Houston, Texas	North Shore (TX)	Texas A&M

=== Coaches ===
The East team was coached by:

- Head Coach Anne Long of Spring Valley High School (Columbia, South Carolina)
- Assistant coach Doretha Garland of Spring Valley High School (Columbia, South Carolina)
- Assistant coach Gregory Bauldrick of Spring Valley High School (Columbia, South Carolina)

The West team was coached by:

- Head Coach Tanya Johnson of Zion-Benton High School (Zion, Illinois)
- Assistant coach Mary Just of Loyola Academy in Wilmette, Illinois
- Assistant coach Ellen O’Brien of Downers Grove South High School in Downers Grove, Illinois

== All-American Week ==
=== Schedule ===
- Monday, March 26: Powerade Jamfest
  - Slam Dunk Contest
  - Three-Point Shoot-out
  - Timed Basketball Skills Competition
- Wednesday, March 28: Girls All-American Game

=== Contest Winners ===
- Breanna Stewart earned perfect scores on two dunks in the first round to advance to the finals. However, Shabazz Muhammad won in the finals.
- Jordan Jones won the skills competition
- Morgan Tuck won the three point shooting competition

== See also ==
2012 McDonald's All-American Boys Game
