= Elizabeth Williams (basketball) =

American basketball player (born 1993)

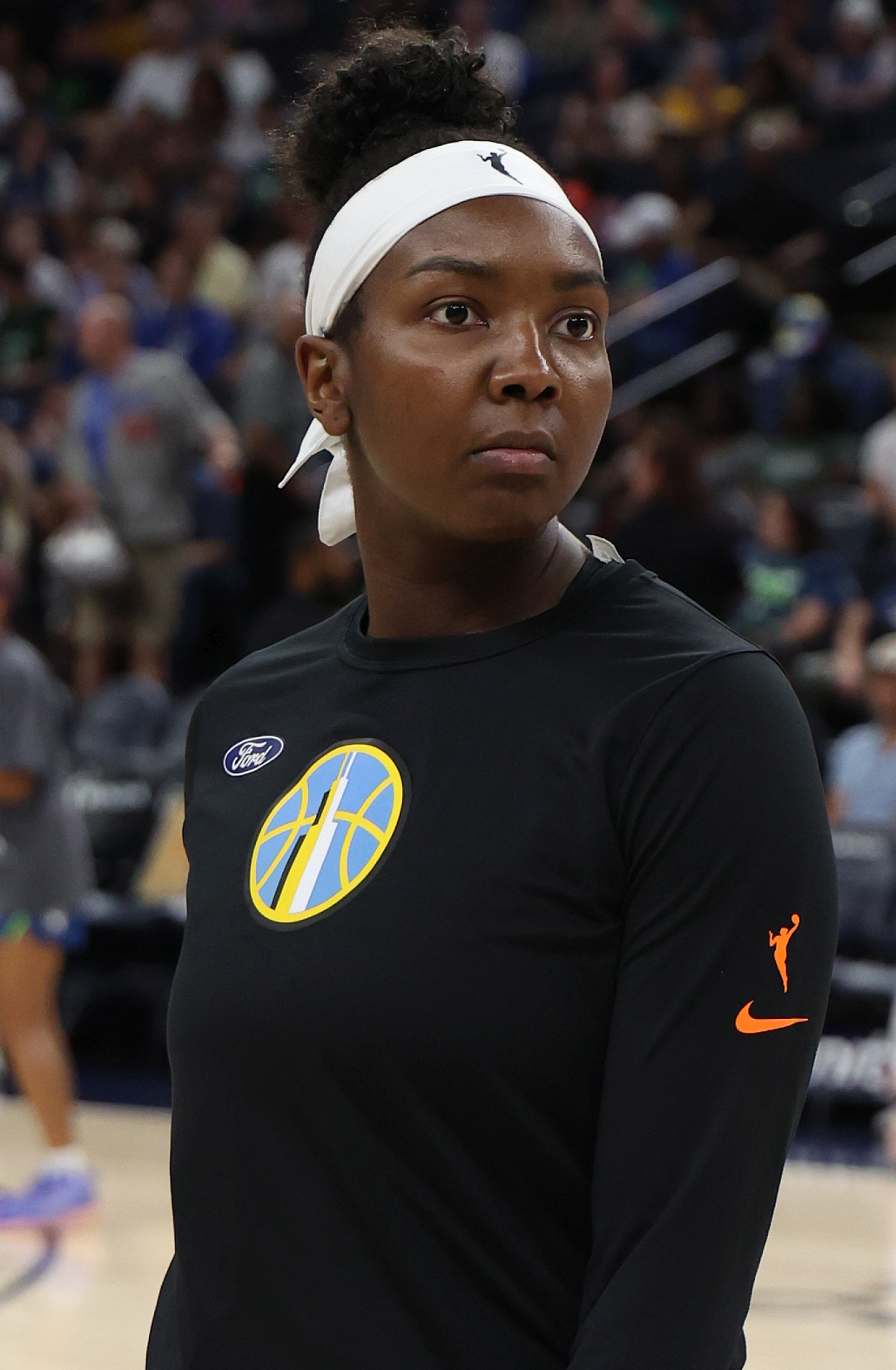
- Williams with the Chicago Sky in 2025

No. 1 – Chicago Sky
- Position: Center / power forward
- League: WNBA

Personal information
- Born: June 23, 1993 (age 33) Colchester, England
- Listed height: 6 ft 3 in (1.91 m)
- Listed weight: 200 lb (91 kg)

Career information
- High school: Princess Anne (Virginia Beach, Virginia)
- College: Duke (2011–2015)
- WNBA draft: 2015: 1st round, 4th overall pick
- Drafted by: Connecticut Sun
- Playing career: 2015–present

Career history
- 2015: Connecticut Sun
- 2015–2016: İstanbul Üniversitesi
- 2016–2021: Atlanta Dream
- 2016–2017: Nadezhda Orenburg
- 2017–2018: Liaoning Flying Eagles
- 2018–2019: Botaş
- 2019–2020: Fenerbahçe
- 2020–2021: Botaş
- 2021–2022: Fenerbahçe
- 2022: Washington Mystics
- 2023–2024: Çukurova Basketbol
- 2023–present: Chicago Sky
- 2025–2026: Galatasaray

Career highlights
- WNBA Most Improved Player (2016); WNBA All-Star (2017); WNBA All-Defensive First Team (2020); WNBA All-Defensive Second Team (2023); Turkish Super League champion (2022); Turkish Presidential Cup (2019); Turkish Cup (2020); WBCA Defensive Player of the Year (2015); All-American – USBWA, WBCA Coaches'(2015); Second-team All-American – AP (2015); 3× Third-team All-American – AP (2012–2014); 4× First-team All-ACC (2012–2015); 4× ACC Defensive Player of the Year (2012–2015); 4× ACC All-Defensive Team (2012–2015); USBWA National Freshman of the Year (2012); ACC Rookie of the Year (2012); Morgan Wootten Player of the Year (2011); McDonald's All-American Game MVP (2011)
- Stats at WNBA.com
- Stats at Basketball Reference
Medals
Women's basketball
Representing United States
FIBA AmeriCup
Gold medal – first place	2019 Puerto Rico	Team
FIBA Under-19 World Cup
Gold medal – first place	2011 Chile	Team
FIBA Under-17 World Cup
Gold medal – first place	2010 France	Team
FIBA Americas Under-16 Championship
Gold medal – first place	2009 Mexico	Team

Elizabeth Olatayo Williams (born June 23, 1993) is a Nigerian-American professional basketball player for the Chicago Sky of the Women's National Basketball Association (WNBA) and for Galatasaray of the Turkish Super League. She played college basketball for the Duke Blue Devils. She was drafted by the Connecticut Sun 4th overall in the 2015 WNBA draft.

== USA Basketball career ==
=== 2009 U16 Mexico City ===
Williams was selected to be a member of the first ever U16 team for USA Basketball. The team competed in the First FIBA Americas U16 Championship For Women held in Mexico City, Mexico in August 2009. She led the team leader in rebounds, with 5.2 per game, and averaged 13.4 points per game, second highest on the team. She tied Breanna Stewart for the most number of blocks per game, recording 7 per game. She helped the team to a 5–0 record and the gold medal at the competition. The win secured an automatic bid to the 2010 FIBA U17 World Championship. Williams was named the Most Valuable Player in the Championship.

=== 2010 U17 France ===
Williams continued with the team as it became the U17 team. The team competed in the 2010 FIBA U17 World Championship for Women, held in Rodez & Toulouse, France during July 2010. Williams helped the team win the gold medal and an 8–0 record. She was the leading scorer, averaging 13.5 points per game and hit 61.8% of her shots, highest on the team and second highest among all participants. She led the team in rebounds, averaging 7.6 per game. She recorded 16 blocks, second highest on the team. Williams started strong, recording a double-double in the opening game against France, and again, with 20 points and 14 rebounds in the second game against Russia.

=== U19 World Championships Chile ===
In 2011, Williams was selected to be on the USA basketball U19 team at the U19 World Championship, held in Puerto Montt, Chile.The USA won their first five games, but then came up short, losing to Canada 64–52. They were still qualified for the medal round, and played France in the quarterfinal. The USA was down by as much as 13 points early in the game, but took a lead with just over a minute to go in the game and ended up with the win 70–64. The USA took an early lead in the semi-final against Brazil, and went on to win to qualify for the gold medal game. The final game was against Spain. Williams was one of three USA players with 15 points in the game, along with Stefanie Dolson and Kaleena Mosqueda-Lewis who helped the USA win the gold medal 69–46. Williams averaged 8.9 points per game and 5.0 rebounds per game to help the US to an 8–1 record and the gold medal in the Championship game.

== College career ==
Williams played at Duke for four seasons. During her last year she averaged 14.5 points, 9.0 rebounds, and 2.5 assists per game. Her assist average was the highest of any center in the country in the Atlantic Coast Conference women's basketball league. She ended her career with 426 total blocks, the ninth highest in NCAA history.

== WNBA career ==
=== Connecticut Sun (2015) ===
Williams was drafted fourth overall by the Connecticut Sun in the 2015 WNBA draft. Her rookie season was her only season with the Sun, where she averaged 3.3 points, 2.3 rebounds, and 0.9 blocks per game.

=== Atlanta Dream (2016–2021) ===
She was traded to the Atlanta Dream for the 2016 WNBA season. For 2016, after experiencing increased per game averages of 11.9 points, 8.1 rebounds, and 2.3 blocks, she won the WNBA Most Improved Player Award.

==== Activism ====
Williams led a campaign criticizing Atlanta team co-owner Senator Kelly Loeffler regarding her comments about the Black Lives Matter movement. Williams was also a part of a campaign consisting of Atlanta Dream players to elect Loeffler's opponent, Raphael Warnock, the eventual winner of the 2020-21 special election for US senator of Georgia.

=== Washington Mystics (2022) ===
In an article for The Players' Tribune published on February 4, 2022, Williams detailed the circumstances and her rationales behind her decision to sign with the Washington Mystics for her eighth WNBA season.

=== Chicago Sky (2023–present) ===
On February 3, 2023, Williams signed a two-year contract with the Chicago Sky.

On June 6, 2024, Williams suffered a torn meniscus, which sidelined her for the remainder of the 2024 season. On September 29, 2024, Williams signed a one-year extension with the team.

== Europe career ==
On June 19, 2025, she signed with Galatasaray of the Turkish Women's Basketball Super League (TKBL).

== Honors ==
- 2015—WBCA All-America team
- 2015—WBCA National Defensive Player of the Year
- 2010—MVP USA Basketball FIBA Americas U16 Championship

== Personal life ==
She was born in England to Nigerian parents. Williams' younger brother, Mark, played college basketball at Duke and was selected 15th overall by the Charlotte Hornets in the 2022 NBA draft.

== Statistics ==
Legend
GP	Games played	GS	Games started	MPG	Minutes per game	RPG	Rebounds per game
APG	Assists per game	SPG	Steals per game	BPG	Blocks per game	PPG	Points per game
TO	Turnovers per game	FG%	Field-goal percentage	3P%	3-point field-goal percentage	FT%	Free-throw percentage
**Bold**	Career best	°	League leader

=== WNBA ===
==== Regular season ====
Stats current through end of 2026 season

WNBA regular season statistics
Year	Team	GP	GS	MPG	FG%	3P%	FT%	RPG	APG	SPG	BPG	TO	PPG
2015	Connecticut	21	0	11.7	.528	–	.560	3.2	0.4	0.3	0.9	**0.5**	3.3
2016	Atlanta	34°	34°	**34.7**°	.442	.000	.692	**8.1**	1.2	0.8	**2.3**	1.2	**11.9**
2017	Atlanta	34	34°	31.4	.485	.000	.659	7.2	1.4	1.1	2.0	1.4	10.4
2018	Atlanta	33	32	26.8	**.548**	–	.563	5.8	1.4	0.8	1.8	1.2	9.1
2019	Atlanta	32	32	28.4	.455	–	.732	6.5	1.2	0.8	1.7	1.3	9.3
2020	Atlanta	22°	22°	29.2	.489	–	**.742**	5.7	1.4	0.8	1.4	1.1	10.1
2021	Atlanta	32°	32°	23.8	.516	–	.509	4.9	1.2	1.1	1.3	0.8	5.8
2022	Washington	30	0	14.9	.482	–	.581	3.8	0.5	0.6	0.7	0.6	5.4
2023	Chicago	40°	**40**°	29.7	.514	–	.630	5.8	**2.5**	**1.3**	1.5	1.4	9.8
2024	Chicago	9	9	27.7	.487	–	.667	7.0	1.6	1.7	1.7	1.7	10.0
2025	Chicago	43	15	21.1	.480	–	.617	5.2	1.8	0.7	0.9	1.3	8.5
2026	Chicago	**44**°	3	17.2	.467	–	.452	3.6	1.4	0.7	0.9	0.8	5.2
**Career**	12 years, 4 teams	374	253	24.7	.486	.000	.625	5.5	1.4	0.8	1.4	1.1	8.2
**Career**	All-Star	1	0	14.2	.500	–	.500	7.0	0.0	2.0	1.0	0.0	8.0

==== Playoffs ====
WNBA playoff statistics
Year	Team	GP	GS	MPG	FG%	3P%	FT%	RPG	APG	SPG	BPG	TO	PPG
2016	Atlanta	2	2	**38.5**	.381	—	**.778**	**12.5**	1.5	0.5	**2.5**	0.5	**11.5**
2018	Atlanta	**5**	**5**	31.4	.511	—	.545	8.8	1.0	**0.6**	1.2	1.0	10.8
2022	Washington	2	0	5.5	**1.000**	—	.250	1.0	0.0	0.0	0.5	**0.0**	2.5
2023	Chicago	2	2	33.0	.286	—	.000	10.0	**3.0**	0.5	2.0	1.5	4.0
**Career**	4 years, 3 teams	11	9	28.3	.452	—	.560	8.3	1.3	0.5	1.5	0.8	8.2

=== College ===
NCAA statistics
Year	Team	GP	GS	MPG	FG%	3P%	FT%	RPG	APG	SPG	BPG	TO	PPG
2011–12	Duke	33	33	30.5	.486	**.500**	.607	7.8	1.6	**1.5**	**3.5**	3.1	14.0
2012–13	Duke	**36**	32	29.5	.508	.000	**.695**	7.3	1.3	1.1	3.0	**2.2**	**15.2**
2013–14	Duke	35	**34**	30.5	**.526**	—	.563	7.6	2.2	1.3	3.1	2.3	13.8
2014–15	Duke	32	31	**32.0**	.488	—	.599	**9.0**	**2.5**	**1.5**	3.0	2.9	14.5
**Career**		136	130	30.6	.502	.333	.619	7.9	1.9	1.4	3.1	2.6	14.4

== See also ==
- List of WNBA career blocks leaders
