= Rachel Hollivay =

American basketball player (born 1993)

Personal information
- Born: October 24, 1993 (age 33) Columbus, Mississippi, U.S.
- Listed height: 6 ft 4 in (1.93 m)

Career information
- High school: Heritage Academy (Columbus, Mississippi); New Hope High School (Columbus, Mississippi)
- College: Rutgers (2012–2016)
- WNBA draft: 2016: 2nd round, 13th overall pick
- Drafted by: Atlanta Dream
- Playing career: 2016–present
- Position: Center
- Number: 55

Career history
- 2016–2017: Atlanta Dream

Career highlights
- Big Ten All-Defensive Team (2016)
- Stats at Basketball Reference

Rachel Hollivay (born October 24, 1993) is an American former professional basketball player. She was drafted in the second round of the 2016 WNBA draft by the Atlanta Dream and spent two years playing for them. She played college basketball at Rutgers.

== College career ==
Hollivay came out of high school ranked 9th overall in the 2012 HoopGurlz Rankings. Hollivay committed to play for Rutgers and join the Scarlet Knights after averaging 25 points, 11 rebounds and 10 blocks during her junior year at Heritage Academy.

During her time at Rutgers, Hollivay was known on the defensive end. She was one of the best rebounders on the team, but she became the Rutger's all-time leader in blocked shots during her senior year - finishing with 322 career blocks. During her senior season, Hollivay was also named to the All-Big Ten Honorable Mention Team, as well as the All-Defensive Team.

== Professional career ==
Hollivay was selected 13th overall in the 2016 WNBA draft by the Atlanta Dream. Hollivay played two seasons in Atlanta before being waived before the 2018 season.

== Career statistics ==
Legend
| GP | Games played | GS | Games started | MPG | Minutes per game | RPG | Rebounds per game |
| APG | Assists per game | SPG | Steals per game | BPG | Blocks per game | PPG | Points per game |
| TO | Turnovers per game | FG% | Field-goal percentage | 3P% | 3-point field-goal percentage | FT% | Free-throw percentage |
| **Bold** | Career best | ° | League leader |

=== College ===
| Year | Team | GP | Points | FG% | 3P% | FT% | RPG | APG | SPG | BPG | PPG |
|---|---|---|---|---|---|---|---|---|---|---|---|
| 2012–13 | Rutgers | 26 | 86 | .536 | .000 | .480 | 2.2 | 0.3 | 0.1 | 0.8 | 3.3 |
| 2013–14 | Rutgers | 18 | 102 | .472 | .000 | .439 | 5.4 | 0.1 | 0.4 | **3.5** | 5.7 |
| 2014–15 | Rutgers | 31 | 209 | **.578** | .000 | **.650** | 4.6 | 0.6 | 0.5 | 2.3 | 6.7 |
| 2015–16 | Rutgers | **34** | **264** | .509 | .000 | .483 | **6.6** | **0.7** | **0.6** | 3.3 | **7.8** |
| Career | | 109 | 661 | .526 | .000 | .521 | 4.8 | 0.5 | 0.4 | 2.4 | 6.1 |

=== WNBA ===
==== Regular season ====
| Year | Team | GP | GS | MPG | FG% | 3P% | FT% | RPG | APG | SPG | BPG | TO | PPG |
|---|---|---|---|---|---|---|---|---|---|---|---|---|---|
| 2016 | Atlanta | **32** | **1** | **8.9** | .316 | – | .469 | **2.1** | **0.1** | **0.1** | **0.4** | 0.3 | 1.2 |
| 2017 | Atlanta | 7 | **1** | 4.9 | **.667** | – | '.500 | 1.3 | 0.0 | 0.0 | 0.3 | **0.1** | **1.3** |
| Career | 2 year, 1 team | 39 | 2 | 8.2 | .364 | .000 | .471 | 1.9 | 0.1 | 0.1 | 0.4 | 0.3 | 1.2 |
