= Angel Goodrich =

American basketball player (born 1990)

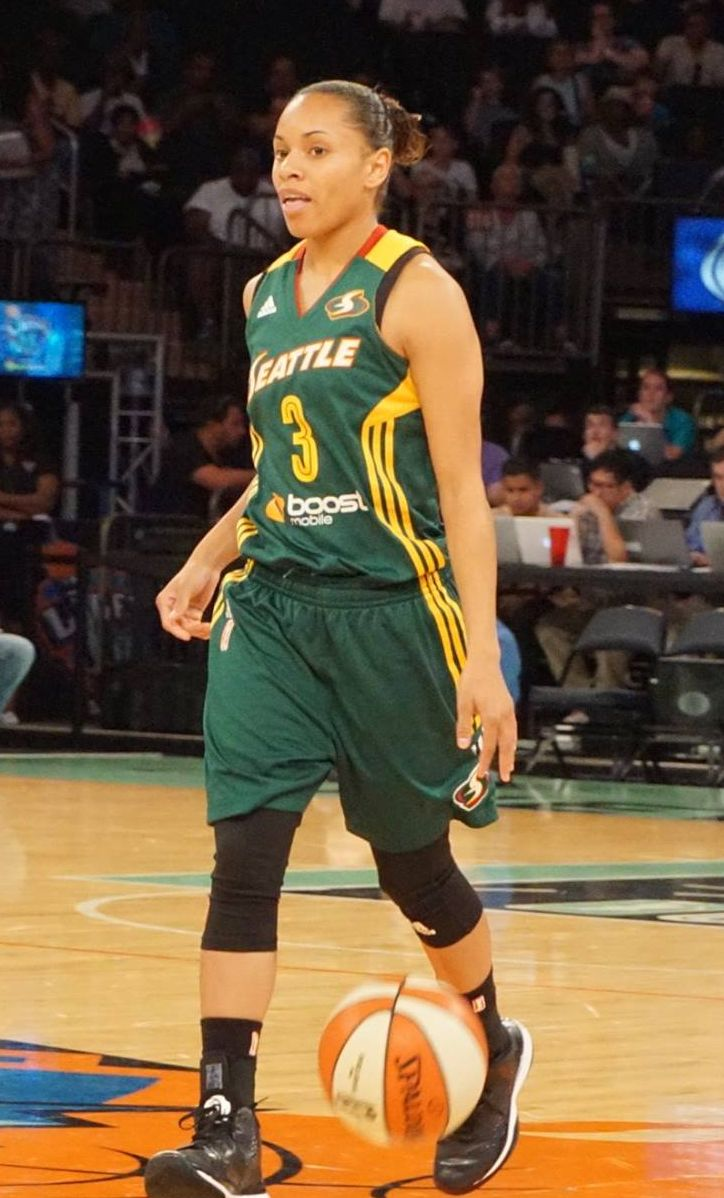
- Goodrich playing for the Seattle Storm in 2015

Personal information
- Born: February 24, 1990 (age 36) Glendale, Arizona, U.S.

Career information
- High school: Sequoyah (Tahlequah, Oklahoma)
- College: Kansas (2009–2013)
- WNBA draft: 2013: 3rd round, 29th overall pick
- Drafted by: Tulsa Shock
- Playing career: 2013–2015
- Position: Guard

Career history
- 2013–2014: Tulsa Shock
- 2014: Chevakata Vologda (RPL)
- 2015: Seattle Storm

Career highlights
- First-team All-Big 12 (2013); NCAA season assists leader (2012)
- Stats at WNBA.com
- Stats at Basketball Reference

Angel Goodrich (born February 24, 1990) is an American former professional basketball player who played for the Tulsa Shock and Seattle Storm in the Women's National Basketball Association (WNBA).

== Background and family ==
Goodrich was born in Glendale, Arizona to Jonathan and Fayth (Goodrichard) Lewis. Jonathan is African-American; Fayth is Native American (Cherokee). Goodrich herself is an enrolled citizen of the Cherokee Nation.

Goodrich has two siblings, an older brother Zach Goodrich, and a younger sister Nikki Lewis. Lewis played college basketball for the Tabor Bluejays.

== High school ==
Goodrich attended Sequoyah High School in Tahlequah, Oklahoma, where she was the first Division I athletic scholarship recipient in the school's history. During her 4 years at the Cherokee-operated school, she lettered in basketball, softball and track and field, and earned All-State honors as a sprinter. She also led the school's basketball team, the Sequoyah Lady Indians, to three consecutive Class AAA state titles.

== College career ==
Goodrich played her college basketball for the Kansas Jayhawks at the University of Kansas. In her freshman year, she tore the anterior cruciate ligament (ACL) in her left knee, causing her to miss the entire season. The following year she tore the ACL in her right knee after only 15 games. Despite these setbacks, she still scored over 1,000 career points for KU, and became the Jayhawks' all-time career assists leader. Her assists total of 771 ranks as the third-highest in Big 12 Conference history.

In her senior year, Goodrich was a finalist for the Naismith Award, Wade Trophy, Wooden Award, Nancy Lieberman Award, and the USBWA Ann Meyers Drysdale Award. She also earned First Team All-Big 12 honors, and was a member of the WBCA All-Region 5 Team.

=== Kansas statistics ===
Legend
GP	Games played	GS	Games started	MPG	Minutes per game	FG%	Field goal percentage	3P%	3-point field goal percentage
FT%	Free throw percentage	RPG	Rebounds per game	APG	Assists per game	SPG	Steals per game	BPG	Blocks per game
TO	Turnovers per game	PPG	Points per game	**Bold**	Career high	*	Led Division I

Year	Team	GP	Points	FG%	3P%	FT%	RPG	APG	SPG	BPG	PPG
2008–09	Kansas	redshirt									
2009–10	Kansas	15	102	34.1%	20.0%	50.0%	2.7	7.1	1.1	0.1	6.8
2010–11	Kansas	27	203	35.8%	28.4%	64.0%	3.0	6.3	1.7	0.1	7.5
2011–12	Kansas	**34**	476	**43.1%**	**38.5%**	65.9%	**4.1**	**7.4***	2.4	**0.4**	14.0
2012–13	Kansas	**34**	**481**	36.5%	31.5%	**73.0%**	3.5	7.2	**2.8**	0.2	**14.1**
Career		127	1262	42.3%	33.3%	62.0%	9.6	0.5	0.8	0.8	9.9

== Professional career ==
In 2013, Goodrich was selected in the third round of the WNBA draft (29th pick overall) by the Tulsa Shock. At the time she was the highest-drafted Native American player in the history of the WNBA. During the 2013–14 off-season, she played for Chevakata Vologda in the Russian Premier League. In 2014, she completed her second and final season for the Shock. In 2015, she was picked up on waivers by the Seattle Storm. In September 2015 Goodrich registered the first double-double (12 points, 10 rebounds) in her three-year WNBA career. Angel then went on to play half a season in Russia and a full season in Poland after she was let go from Seattle in 2016. Goodrich then turned her attention to teaching Native American youth at a basketball camp to help prepare them for playing at a collegiate level.

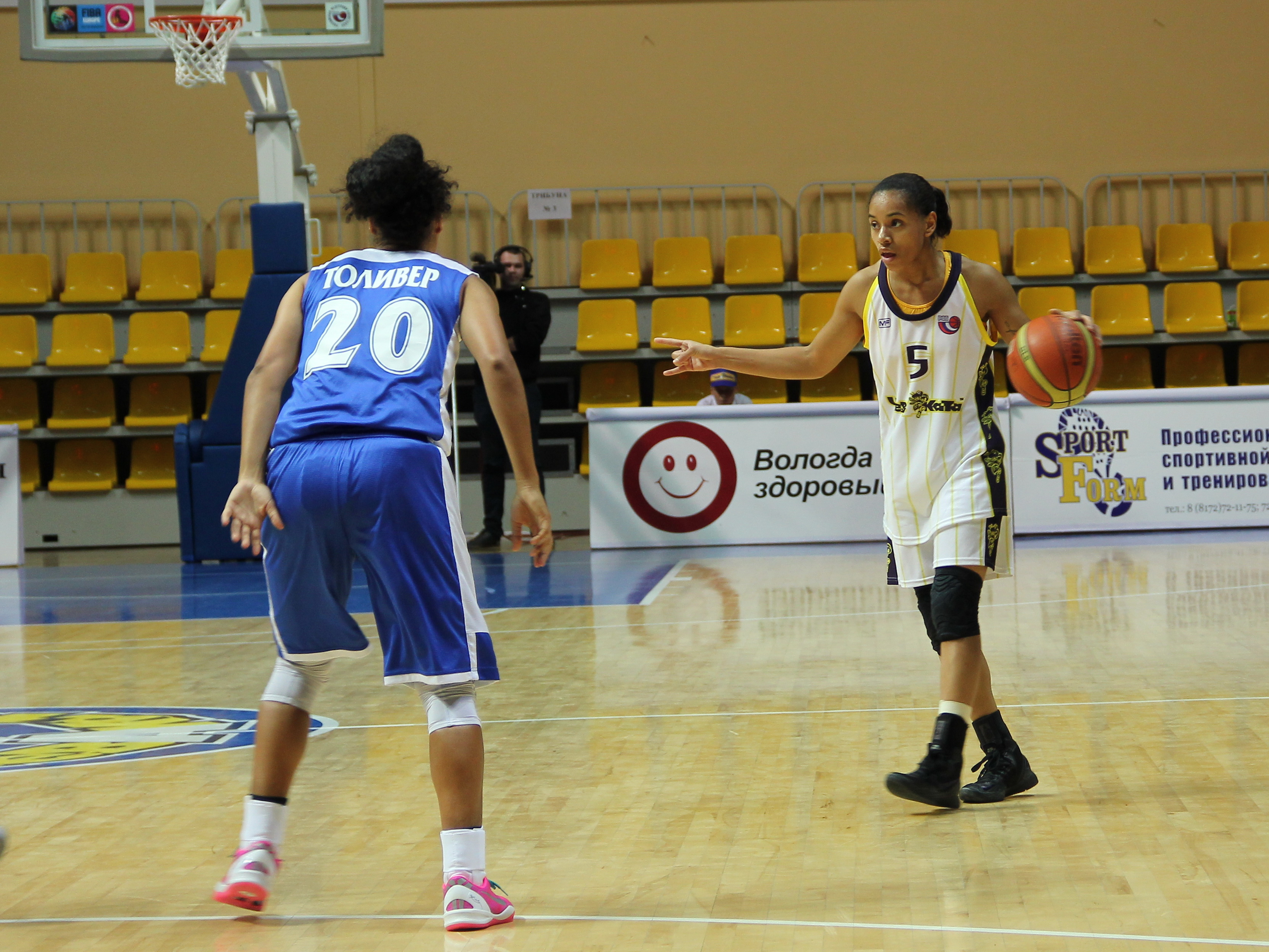
Goodrich vs Kristi Toliver

== WNBA career statistics ==
Legend
GP	Games played	GS	Games started	MPG	Minutes per game	RPG	Rebounds per game
APG	Assists per game	SPG	Steals per game	BPG	Blocks per game	PPG	Points per game
TO	Turnovers per game	FG%	Field-goal percentage	3P%	3-point field-goal percentage	FT%	Free-throw percentage
**Bold**	Career best	°	League leader

Year	Team	GP	GS	MPG	FG%	3P%	FT%	RPG	APG	SPG	BPG	TO	PPG
2013	Tulsa	**31**	**16**	**21.9**	.423	.250	.545	**1.8**	2.9	**1.2**	**0.1**	1.7	**4.4**
2014	Tulsa	28	0	6.5	**.500**	**.500**	**.571**	0.4	0.8	0.3	0.0	**0.7**	1.0
2015	Seattle	23	5	15.8	.408	.300	.500	1.7	**3.0**	0.6	0.0	1.2	3.0
Career	3 years, 2 teams	82	21	14.9	.426	.273	.538	1.3	2.2	0.7	0.0	1.2	2.9

== See also ==
- Tahnee Robinson
