= WNBA All-Rookie Team =

WNBA award

The WNBA All-Rookie Team is an annual Women's National Basketball Association (WNBA) honor given since the 2005 WNBA season to the top rookies during the regular season. Voting is conducted by the WNBA head coaches, who are not allowed to vote for players on their own team. Each coach selects five players. A player is given a point for every vote they receive. The top vote getters comprise the team, regardless of the positions they play. Through the 2021 season, this differed from the WNBA's voting procedure for the All-WNBA and All-Defensive Teams, in which all first and second teams consisted of a center, two forwards, and two guards. The WNBA has since adopted the positionless format for its All-WNBA and All-Defensive Teams, respectively adopting the format in 2022 and 2023.

The All-Rookie Team is generally composed of a five-woman lineup, but in the case of a tie at the fifth position, the roster is expanded.

Candace Parker of the Los Angeles Sparks was named to the All-Rookie Team and won the WNBA Most Valuable Player Award in the same season. This feat had never before been accomplished. In the NBA, only Wes Unseld and Wilt Chamberlain has held this distinction.

== Winners ==
Legend

^	Denotes player who is still active in the WNBA
*	Elected to Naismith Memorial Basketball Hall of Fame as player
†	Not yet eligible for Hall of Fame consideration (Note: A player is not eligible for induction into the Naismith Memorial Basketball Hall of Fame until she has been fully retired for two calendar years.)
§	1st time eligible for Hall of Fame in 2027
**Player** (in bold text)	Indicates player who won Rookie of the Year award
Team (#)	Denotes number of times a player from team has won
Player (in italic text)	Indicates player who was drafted first overall

Seimone Augustus was named to the All-Rookie Team in the 2006 WNBA season.

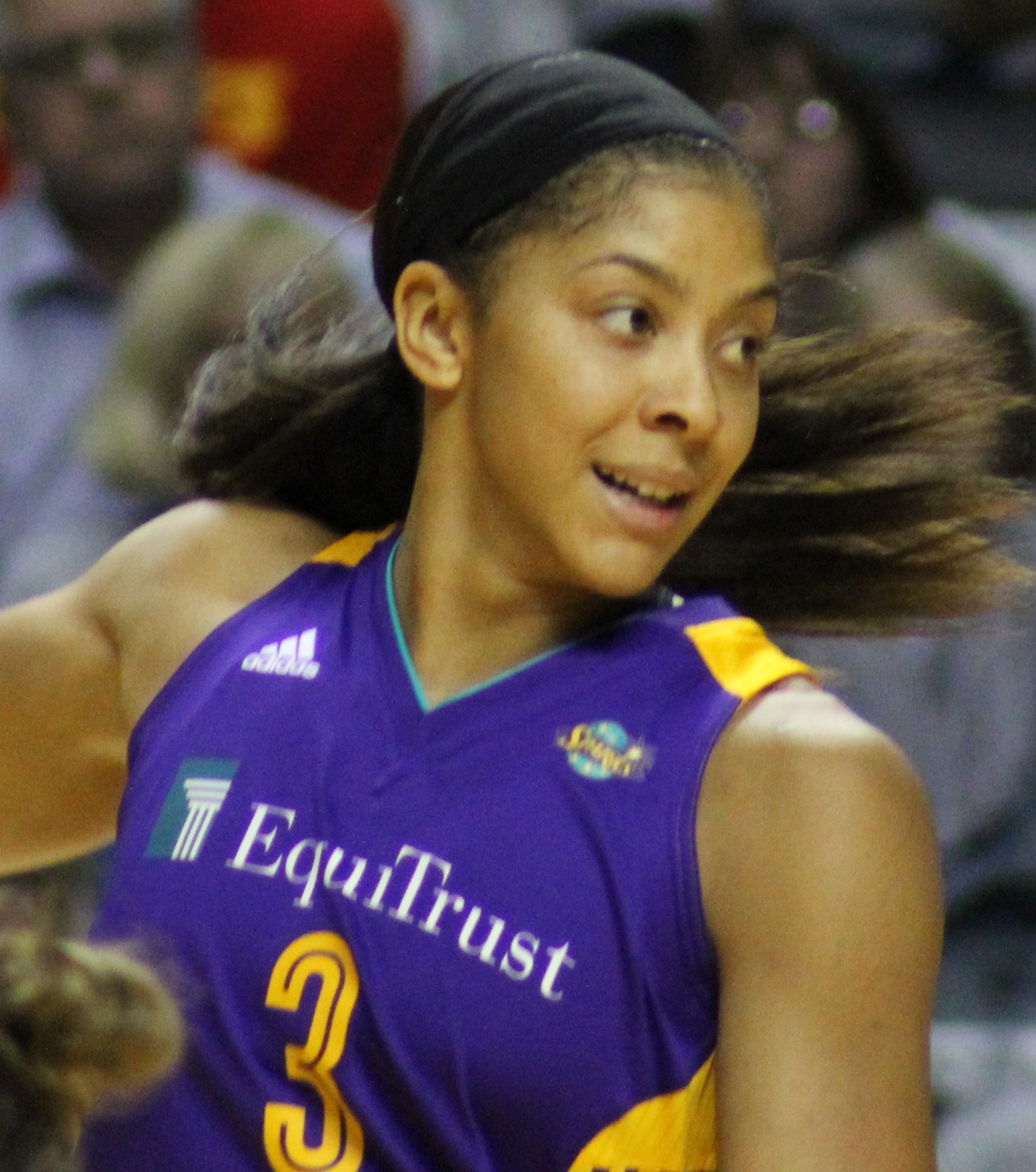
Candace Parker was named to the All-Rookie Team in the 2008 WNBA season.

Maya Moore was named to the All-Rookie Team in the 2011 WNBA season.

Elena Delle Donne was named to the All-Rookie Team in the 2013 WNBA season.

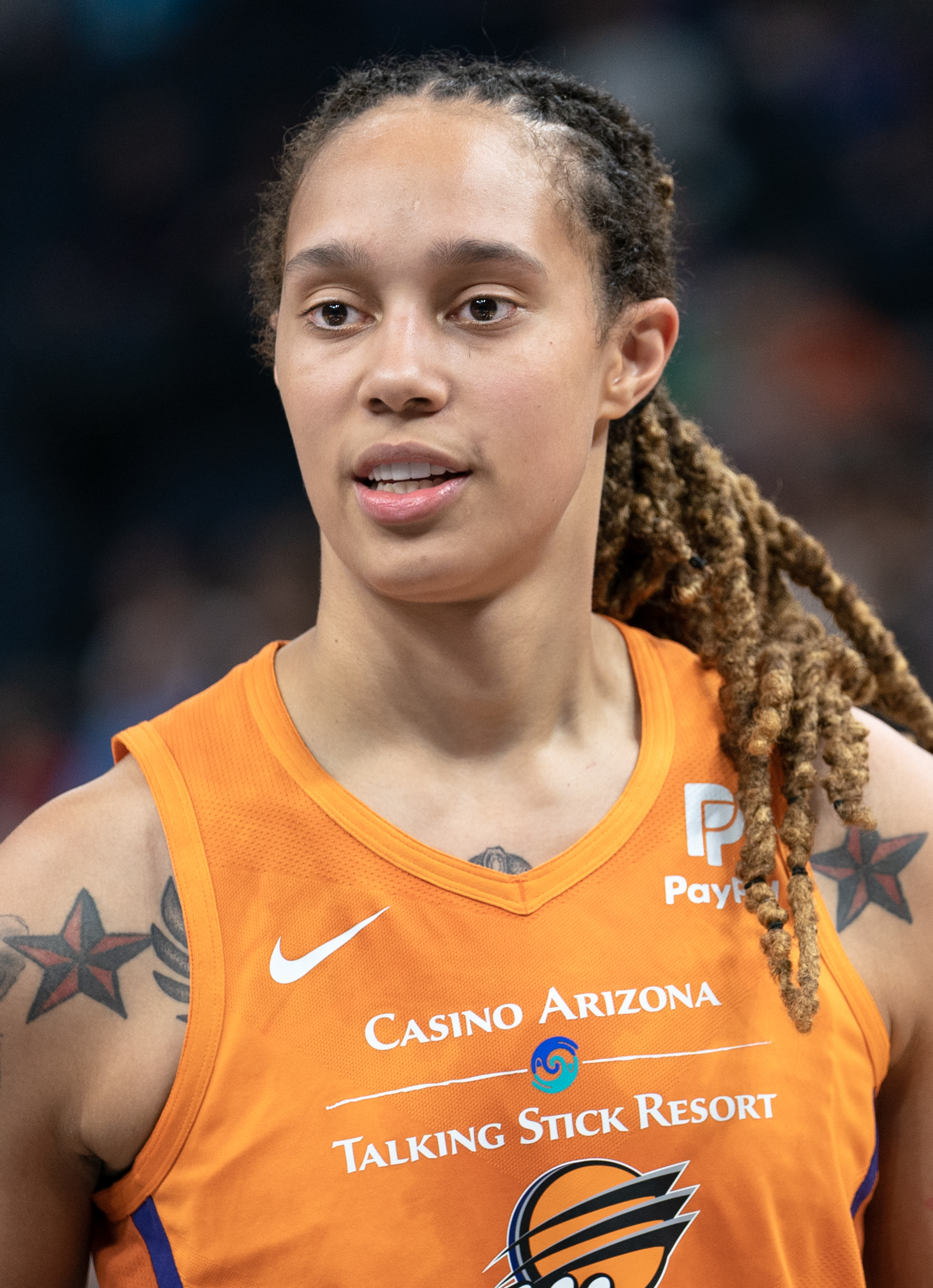
Brittney Griner was named to the All-Rookie Team in the 2013 WNBA season.

Breanna Stewart was named to the All-Rookie Team in the 2016 WNBA season.

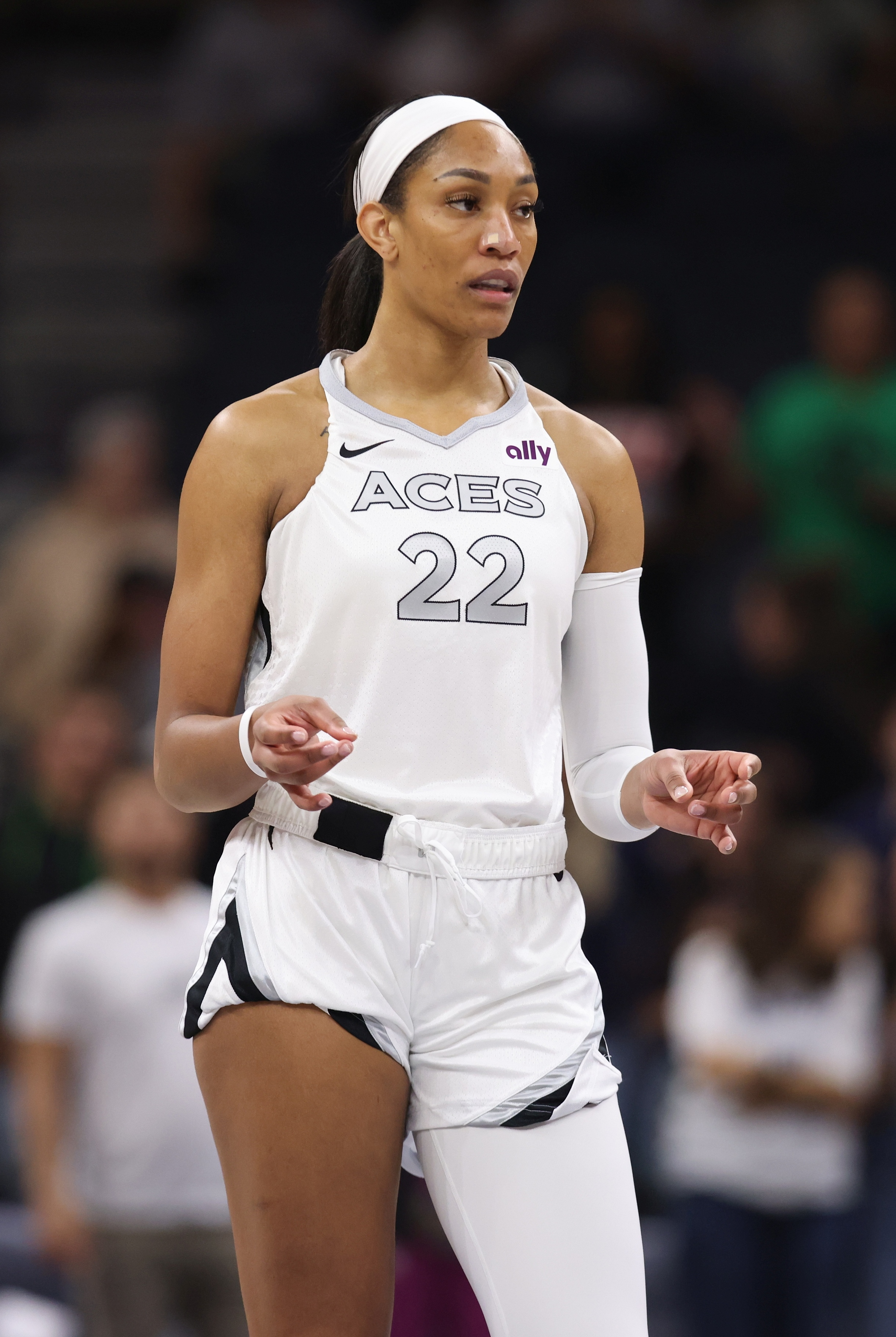
A'ja Wilson was named to the All-Rookie Team in the 2018 WNBA season.

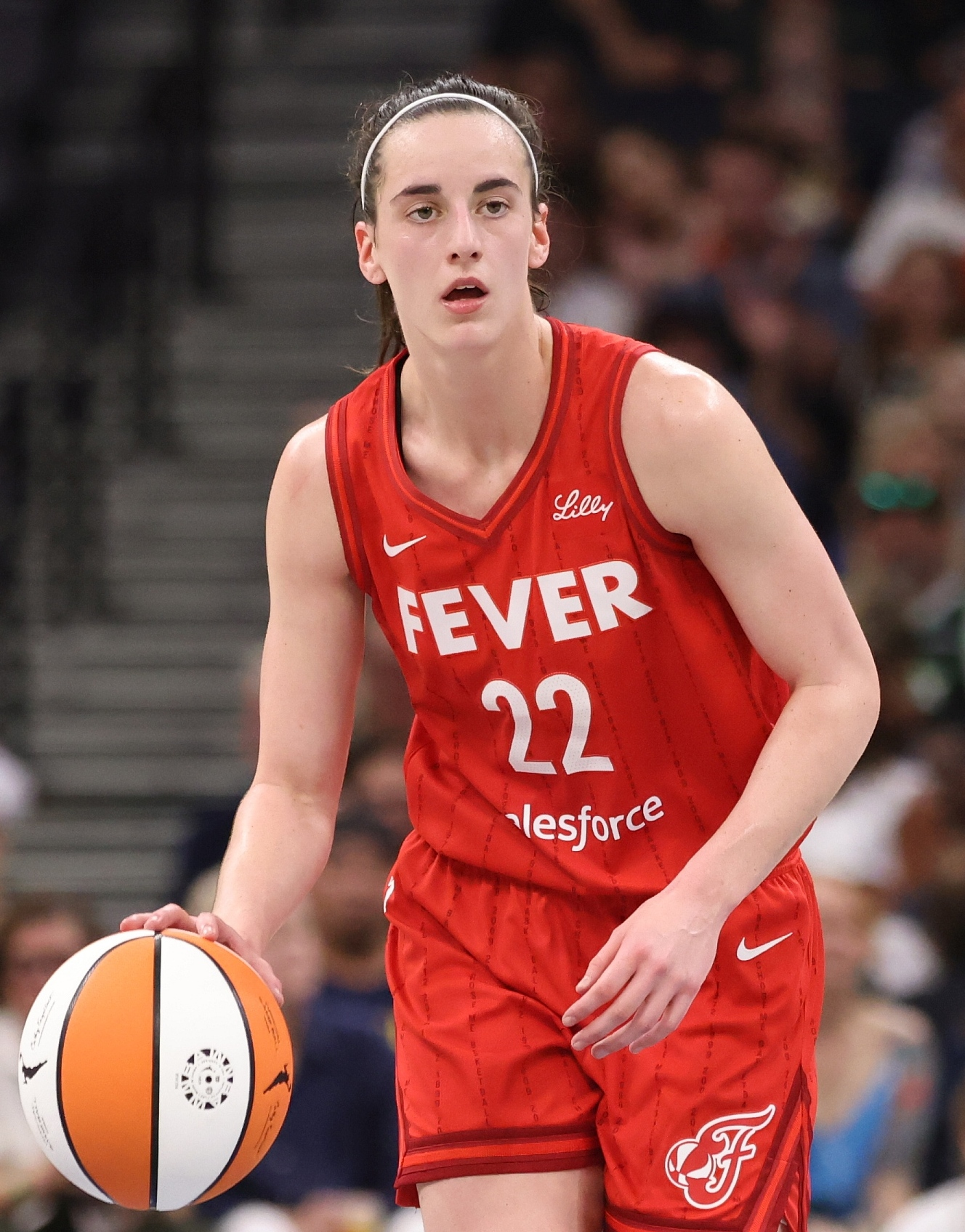
Caitlin Clark was named to the All-Rookie Team in the 2024 WNBA season.

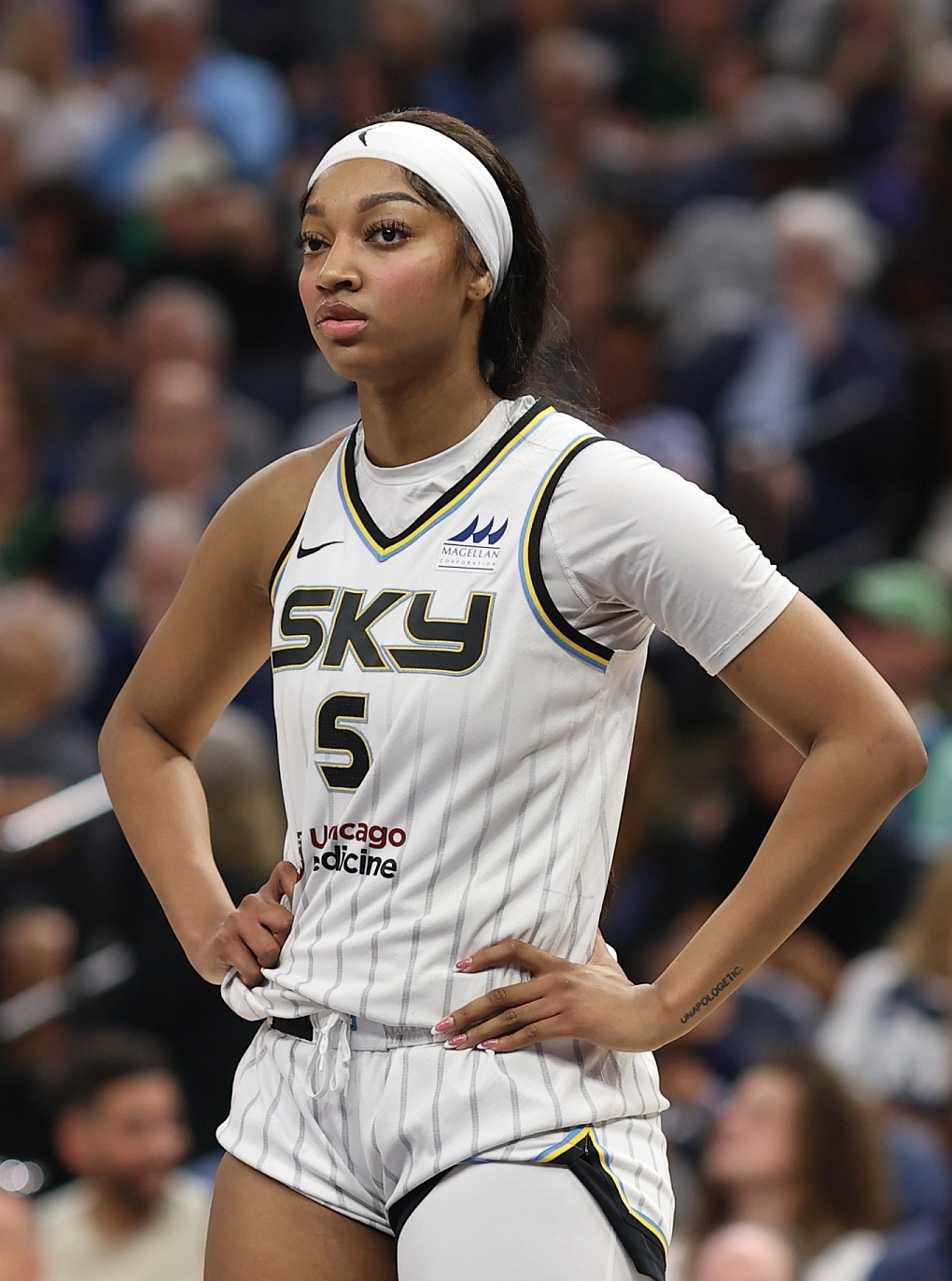
Angel Reese was named to the All-Rookie Team in the 2024 WNBA season.

Season	Rookie team	
Season	Players	Teams
2005	(United States) Chelsea Newton	Sacramento Monarchs
2005	(United States) Kara Braxton	Detroit Shock
2005	(United States) Katie Feenstra	San Antonio Silver Stars
2005	(United States) Tan White	Indiana Fever
2005	(United States) **Temeka Johnson**	Washington Mystics
2006	(United States) **Seimone Augustus***	Minnesota Lynx
2006	(United States) Cappie Pondexter	Phoenix Mercury
2006	(United States) Candice Dupree	Chicago Sky
2006	(Saint Vincent and the Grenadines) Sophia Young	San Antonio Silver Stars (2)
2006	(United States) Monique Currie	Charlotte Sting
2007	(United States) **Armintie Price**	Chicago Sky (2)
2007	(United States) Sidney Spencer	Los Angeles Sparks
2007	(United States) Lindsey Harding	Minnesota Lynx (2)
2007	(United States) Camille Little	San Antonio Silver Stars (3)
2007	(Spain) Marta Fernández	Los Angeles Sparks (2)
2008	(United States) **Candace Parker***	Los Angeles Sparks (3)
2008	(United States) Candice Wiggins	Minnesota Lynx (3)
2008	(United States) Sylvia Fowles*	Chicago Sky (2)
2008	(United States) Nicky Anosike	Minnesota Lynx (4)
2008	(United States) Matee Ajavon (tie)	Houston Comets
2008	(United States) Amber Holt (tie)	Connecticut Sun
2009	(United States) **Angel McCoughtry**	Atlanta Dream
2009	(United States) DeWanna Bonner^	Phoenix Mercury (2)
2009	(United States) Shavonte Zellous	Detroit Shock (2)
2009	(United States) Renee Montgomery	Minnesota Lynx (5)
2009	(United States) Marissa Coleman	Washington Mystics (2)
2010	(United States) **Tina Charles**^{†}	Connecticut Sun (2)
2010	(United States) Monica Wright	Minnesota Lynx (6)
2010	(United States) Epiphanny Prince	Chicago Sky (3)
2010	(United States) Kelsey Griffin	Connecticut Sun (3)
2010	(United States) Kalana Greene	New York Liberty
2011	(United States) **Maya Moore***	Minnesota Lynx (7)
2011	(United States) Danielle Robinson	San Antonio Silver Stars (4)
2011	(United States) Courtney Vandersloot^	Chicago Sky (4)
2011	(United States) Danielle Adams	San Antonio Silver Stars (5)
2011	(Australia) Liz Cambage	Tulsa Shock (2)
2012	(United States) **Nneka Ogwumike**^	Los Angeles Sparks (4)
2012	(United States) Glory Johnson	Tulsa Shock (3)
2012	(United States) Tiffany Hayes^	Atlanta Dream (2)
2012	(United States) Samantha Prahalis	Phoenix Mercury (3)
2012	(United States) Riquna Williams	Tulsa Shock (4)
2013	(United States) **Elena Delle Donne***	Chicago Sky (5)
2013	(United States) Brittney Griner^	Phoenix Mercury (4)
2013	(United States) Alex Bentley	Atlanta Dream (3)
2013	(United States) Kelsey Bone	New York Liberty (2)
2013	(United States) Skylar Diggins-Smith^	Tulsa Shock (5)
2014	(United States) **Chiney Ogwumike**	Connecticut Sun (4)
2014	(United States) Odyssey Sims^	Tulsa Shock (6)
2014	(United States) Kayla McBride^	San Antonio Stars (6)
2014	(United States) Bria Hartley	Washington Mystics (3)
2014	(United States) Alyssa Thomas^	Connecticut Sun (5)
2015	(United States) **Jewell Loyd**^	Seattle Storm
2015	(United States) Kiah Stokes^	New York Liberty (3)
2015	(United States) Brittany Boyd	New York Liberty (4)
2015	(Japan) Ramu Tokashiki	Seattle Storm (2)
2015	(Canada) Natalie Achonwa (tie)	Indiana Fever (2)
2015	(Serbia) Ana Dabović (tie)	Los Angeles Sparks (5)
2016	(United States) **Breanna Stewart**^	Seattle Storm (3)
2016	(United States) Moriah Jefferson	San Antonio Stars (7)
2016	(United States) Aerial Powers	Dallas Wings (7)
2016	(United States) Imani McGee-Stafford	Chicago Sky (6)
2016	(United States) Tiffany Mitchell	Indiana Fever (3)
2017	(United States) **Allisha Gray**^	Dallas Wings (8)
2017	(United States) Brittney Sykes^	Atlanta Dream (4)
2017	(United States) Kelsey Plum^	San Antonio Stars (8)
2017	(United States) Kaela Davis	Dallas Wings (9)
2017	(United States) Shatori Walker-Kimbrough^	Washington Mystics (4)
2018	(United States) **A'ja Wilson**^	Las Vegas Aces (9)
2018	(United States) Ariel Atkins^	Washington Mystics (5)
2018	(United States) Azurá Stevens^	Dallas Wings (10)
2018	(United States) Diamond DeShields^{§}	Chicago Sky (7)
2018	(United States) Kelsey Mitchell^	Indiana Fever (4)
2019	(United States) **Napheesa Collier**^	Minnesota Lynx (8)
2019	(United States) Teaira McCowan^	Indiana Fever (5)
2019	(United States) Arike Ogunbowale^	Dallas Wings (11)
2019	(United States) Brianna Turner^	Phoenix Mercury (5)
2019	(United States) Jackie Young^	Las Vegas Aces (10)
2020	(United States) **Crystal Dangerfield**	Minnesota Lynx (9)
2020	(Belgium) Julie Allemand^	Indiana Fever (6)
2020	(United States) Chennedy Carter^	Atlanta Dream (5)
2020	(United States) Jazmine Jones	New York Liberty (5)
2020	(Germany) Satou Sabally^	Dallas Wings (12)
2021	(United States) **Michaela Onyenwere**^	New York Liberty (6)
2021	(United States) Dana Evans^	Chicago Sky (8)
2021	(United States) Aari McDonald^	Atlanta Dream (6)
2021	(United States) DiDi Richards	New York Liberty (7)
2021	(United States) Charli Collier	Dallas Wings (13)
2022	(United States) **Rhyne Howard**^	Atlanta Dream (7)
2022	(United States) NaLyssa Smith^	Indiana Fever (7)
2022	(United States) Shakira Austin^	Washington Mystics (6)
2022	(United States) Queen Egbo	Indiana Fever (8)
2022	(United States) Rebekah Gardner^	Chicago Sky (9)
2023	(United States) **Aliyah Boston**^	Indiana Fever (9)
2023	(United States) Jordan Horston^	Seattle Storm (4)
2023	(Hungary) Dorka Juhász^	Minnesota Lynx (10)
2023	(United States) Diamond Miller^	Minnesota Lynx (11)
2023	(China) Li Meng	Washington Mystics (7)
2024	(United States) **Caitlin Clark**^	Indiana Fever (10)
2024	(United States) Rickea Jackson^	Los Angeles Sparks (6)
2024	(United States) Angel Reese^	Chicago Sky (10)
2024	(Brazil) Kamilla Cardoso^	Chicago sky (8)
2024	(Germany) Leonie Fiebich^	Washington Mystics (7)
2025	(United States) **Paige Bueckers**^	Dallas Wings (14)
2025	(United States) Kiki Iriafen^	Washington Mystics (8)
2025	(United States) Sonia Citron^	Washington Mystics (9)
2025	(France) Dominique Malonga^	Seattle Storm (5)
2025	(France) Janelle Salaün^	Golden State Valkyries
2026	(United States) **Olivia Miles**^	Minnesota Lynx (12)
2026	(United States) Azzi Fudd^	Dallas Wings (15)
2026	(United States) Flau'jae Johnson^	Seattle Storm (6)
2026	(United States) Kiki Rice (tie)^	Toronto Tempo
2026	(France) Pauline Astier (tie)^	New York Liberty (9)
2026	(United States) Sydney Taylor^	Chicago Sky (11)
