= 2014 Tulsa Shock season =

- Coach: Fred Williams
- Arena: BOK Center
- Attendance: per game

Results
- Record: 12–22 (.353)
- Place: 5th (Western)
- Playoff finish: DNQ

The 2014 WNBA season was the 17th season for the Tulsa Shock of the Women's National Basketball Association. It is their fifth in Tulsa. Tulsa still hasn't made the playoffs after moving from Detroit.

== Transactions ==
=== WNBA draft ===
The following are the Shock's selections in the 2014 WNBA draft.

Round	Pick	Player	Nationality	School/Team/Country

== Roster ==
2014 Tulsa Shock roster
Players
Coaches

Pos.	No.	Nat.	Name	Height	Weight	DOB	From	Yrs
F	22	(United States)	Baugh, Vicki	6' 4" (1.93m)	190 lb (86kg)	1989-05-21	Tennessee	R
C	8	(Australia)	Cambage, Liz	6' 8" (2.03m)	215 lb (98kg)	1991-08-18	Australia	3
G	4	(United States)	Diggins, Skylar	5' 9" (1.75m)	145 lb (66kg)	1990-08-02	Notre Dame	1
G	10	(United States)	Goodrich, Angel	5' 4" (1.63m)	127 lb (58kg)	1990-02-24	Kansas	R
G	15	(United States)	Hodges, Roneeka	5' 11" (1.8m)	165 lb (75kg)	1982-07-19	Florida State	8
F	35	(United States)	Hooper, Jordan	6' 2" (1.88m)	185 lb (84kg)	1992-02-20	Nebraska	R
F	33	(United States)	Jackson-Jones, Tiffany	6' 3" (1.91m)	185 lb (84kg)	1985-04-26	Texas	5
F	25	(United States)	Johnson, Glory	6' 3" (1.91m)	170 lb (77kg)	1990-07-27	Tennessee	2
F	21	(United States)	Lacy, Jennifer	6' 3" (1.91m)	175 lb (79kg)	1983-03-21	Pepperdine	7
C	3	(United States)	Paris, Courtney	6' 4" (1.93m)	250 lb (113kg)	1987-09-21	Oklahoma	3
F	55	(United States)	Plaisance, Theresa	6' 5" (1.96m)	200 lb (91kg)	1992-05-18	LSU	R
G	0	(United States)	Sims, Odyssey	5' 8" (1.73m)	160 lb (73kg)	1992-07-13	Baylor	R
G	2	(United States)	Williams, Riquna	5' 7" (1.7m)	165 lb (75kg)	1990-05-28	Miami (FL)	2

Head coach
(United States) Fred Williams (Boise State)
Assistant coaches
(United States) Bridget Pettis (Florida)
(United States) Ed Baldwin (North Carolina Central)
Athletic trainer
(United States) Allison Russell (Tulsa)

Legend

- (C) Team captain
- (DP) Unsigned draft pick
- (FA) Free agent
- (S) Suspended
- Injured

== Season standings ==
#	Western Conference					
#	Team	W	L	PCT	GB	GP
1	y-Phoenix Mercury	29	5	.853	-	34
2	x-Minnesota Lynx	25	9	.735	4.0	34
3	x-San Antonio Stars	16	18	.471	13.0	34
4	x-Los Angeles Sparks	16	18	.471	13.0	34
5	e-Tulsa Shock	12	22	.353	17.0	34
6	e-Seattle Storm	12	22	.353	17.0	34
