= Fred Williams (basketball, born 1957) =

American basketball coach (born 1957)

Florida Gators
- Position: Assistant coach
- League: SEC

Personal information
- Born: February 8, 1957 (age 69) Inglewood, California, U.S.

Career information
- College: Boise State (1976–1979)

Career history

Coaching
- 1995–1997: USC (women's)
- 1998: Utah Starzz (assistant)
- 1999–2001: Utah Starzz
- 2003–2004: Charlotte Sting (assistant)
- 2009–2012: Atlanta Dream (assistant)
- 2012–2013: Atlanta Dream
- 2014–2018: Tulsa Shock / Dallas Wings
- 2019–2022: Los Angeles Sparks (assistant)
- 2022: Los Angeles Sparks (interim head coach)
- 2022–2025: Auburn (women's) (associate head coach)
- 2025–present: Florida (women's) (assistant)
- Stats at WNBA.com

Fred Williams (born February 8, 1957) is an American basketball coach who is currently the assistant coach for the Florida Gators women's basketball team.

== Career ==
Williams served as an assistant coach at the University of Southern California from 1983 to 1990 and as head coach from 1995 to 1997. Williams coached the Utah Starzz (now the San Antonio Stars) of the WNBA from 1999 to 2001 and later served as an assistant coach with the Charlotte Sting. Williams coached the San Diego Siege of the NWBL, before joining the Atlanta Dream as an assistant coach in 2009.

Williams took over as head coach and general manager of the Atlanta Dream of the WNBA on August 27, 2012, when the team fired Marynell Meadors. The Dream lost their first game under Williams, falling to the Tulsa Shock 84–80. However, the team rebounded, winning six of their next seven, and qualified for the playoffs.

In his first full season as head coach, the Dream got out to a 10–1 record, which at the time was the best in the league. However, forward Sancho Lyttle went out with a fractured foot, and the Dream struggled to finish the season, ending with a 17–17 record. Nevertheless, the Dream got hot in the playoffs and earned their third trip to the WNBA Finals in four seasons, losing in three games to the Minnesota Lynx.

Despite guiding his team to an Eastern Conference championship, it was announced at the end of the season that Williams' contract would not be renewed. On January 23, 2014, the Shock announced his hiring as their third head coach since the franchise moved to Tulsa, replacing Gary Kloppenburg.

== Coaching record ==
Legend
Regular season	G	Games coached	W	Games won	L	Games lost	W–L %	Win–loss %
Playoffs	PG	Playoff games	PW	Playoff wins	PL	Playoff losses	PW–L %	Playoff win–loss %

Team	Year	G	W	L	W–L%	Finish	PG	PW	PL	PW–L%	Result
UTA	1999	28	13	15	.463	6th in West	—	—	—	—	Missed Playoffs
UTA	2000	32	18	14	.563	5th in West	—	—	—	—	Missed Playoffs
UTA	2001	13	5	8	.384	3rd in West	—	—	—	—	Left Before Playoffs
ATL	2012	10	7	3	.700	3rd in East	3	1	2	.333	Lost in Eastern Conference Semi-Finals
ATL	2013	34	17	17	.500	2nd in East	8	4	4	.500	Lost in WNBA Finals
TUL	2014	34	12	22	.353	5th in West	—	—	—	—	Missed Playoffs
TUL	2015	34	18	16	.529	3rd in West	2	0	2	.000	Lost in Western Conference Semi-Finals
DAL	2016	34	11	23	.324	5th in West	-	-	-	-	Missed Playoffs
DAL	2017	34	16	18	.471	4th in West	1	0	1	.000	Lost in 1st Round
DAL	2018	31	14	17	.452	5th in West	–	–	–	–	Missed Playoffs
LAS	2022	24	8	16	.333	12th in West	–	–	–	–	Missed Playoffs
Career		308	139	169	.451		14	5	9	.357	
