= 2013 Tulsa Shock season =

- Coach: Gary Kloppenburg
- Arena: BOK Center
- Attendance: per game

Results
- Record: 11–23 (.324)
- Place: 6th (Western)
- Playoff finish: DNQ

Media
- Television: COX; ESPN2, NBATV

The 2013 WNBA season was the 16th season for the Tulsa Shock of the Women's National Basketball Association. It is their fourth in Tulsa.

== Transactions ==
=== WNBA draft ===
The following are the Shock's selections in the 2013 WNBA draft.

Round	Pick	Player	Nationality	School/team/country	Source
1	3	Skylar Diggins	American	Notre Dame	
3	27	Angel Goodrich	American	Kansas	

== Roster ==
2013 Tulsa Shock roster
Players
Coaches

Pos.	No.	Nat.	Name	Height	Weight	DOB	From	Yrs
C	8	(Australia)	Cambage, Liz	6' 8" (2.03m)	215 lb (98kg)	1991-08-18	Australia	1
G	4	(United States)	Diggins, Skylar	5' 9" (1.75m)	145 lb (66kg)	1990-08-02	Notre Dame	R
G	10	(United States)	Goodrich, Angel	5' 4" (1.63m)	127 lb (58kg)	1990-02-24	Kansas	R
G	15	(United States)	Hodges, Roneeka	5' 11" (1.8m)	165 lb (75kg)	1982-07-19	Florida State	8
F	33	(United States)	Jackson-Jones, Tiffany	6' 3" (1.91m)	185 lb (84kg)	1985-04-26	Texas	5
F	25	(United States)	Johnson, Glory	6' 3" (1.91m)	170 lb (77kg)	1990-07-27	Tennessee	1
F	21	(United States)	Lacy, Jennifer	6' 3" (1.91m)	175 lb (79kg)	1983-03-21	Pepperdine	7
C	3	(United States)	Paris, Courtney	6' 4" (1.93m)	250 lb (113kg)	1987-09-21	Oklahoma	3
F	28	(United States)	Powell, Nicole	6' 2" (1.88m)	170 lb (77kg)	1982-06-22	Stanford	9
G	2	(United States)	Wiggins, Candice	5' 11" (1.8m)	147 lb (67kg)	1987-02-14	Stanford	5
G	1	(United States)	Williams, Riquna	5' 7" (1.7m)	165 lb (75kg)	1990-05-28	Miami (FL)	1

Head coach
(United States) Gary Kloppenburg (UC San Diego)
Assistant coaches
(United States) Jason Glover (Grand Canyon)
(United States) Stacey Lovelace (Purdue)
Athletic trainer
(United States) Allison Russell (Tulsa)

Legend

- (C) Team captain
- (DP) Unsigned draft pick
- (FA) Free agent
- (S) Suspended
- Injured

=== Depth ===
Pos.	Starter	Bench
C	Liz Cambage	Tiffany Jackson-Jones; Courtney Paris
PF	Glory Johnson	Jennifer Lacy
SF	Nicole Powell	Roneeka Hodges
SG	Candice Wiggins	Riquna Williams
PG	Skylar Diggins	Angel Goodrich

== Season standings ==
#	Western Conference					
#	Team	W	L	PCT	GB	GP
1	z-Minnesota Lynx	26	8	.765	-	34
2	x-Los Angeles Sparks	24	10	.706	2	34
3	x-Phoenix Mercury	19	15	.559	7	34
4	x-Seattle Storm	17	17	.500	9	34
5	e-San Antonio Silver Stars	12	22	.353	14	34
6	e-Tulsa Shock	11	23	.324	15	34

== Schedule ==
=== Preseason ===
2013 pre-season game log
Total: 1–2 (Home: 0–1; Road: 1–1)
Pre-season: 1–2 (Home: 0–1; Road: 1–1)

Game	Date	Team	Score	High points	High rebounds	High assists	Location Attendance	Record
1	May 9	Atlanta	L 58–72	Kayla Pedersen (11)	Courtney Paris (9)	Diggins & Williams (3)	BOK Center; 5280	0–1
2	May 17	@ Seattle	L 59–63	Riquna Williams (19)	Glory Johnson (18)	Paris, Pedersen, & Williams (2)	Key Arena; 4347	0–2
3	May 19	@ Los Angeles	W 82–67	Glory Johnson (22)	Glory Johnson (7)	Angel Goodrich (8)	SRC Arena; 1917	1–2

2013 season schedule

=== Regular season ===
2013 game log
Total: 11–23 (Home: 7–10; Road: 4–13)
May: 0–3 (Home: 0–1; Road: 0–2)

Game	Date	Team	Score	High points	High rebounds	High assists	Location Attendance	Record
1	May 25	@ Atlanta	L 81–98	Riquna Williams (22)	Liz Cambage (8)	Candice Wiggins (4)	Philips Arena; 7519	0–1
2	May 27	Washington	L 90–95 (OT)	Roneeka Hodges (22)	Glory Johnson (14)	Skylar Diggins (11)	BOK Center; 7381	0–2
3	May 31	@ NY Liberty	L 76–78 (OT)	Liz Cambage (22)	Glory Johnson (11)	Candice Wiggins (4)	Prudential Center; 7532	0–3

June : 3–7 (Home: 2–2; Road: 1–5)

Game	Date	Team	Score	High points	High rebounds	High assists	Location Attendance	Record
4	June 2	@ Chicago	L 71–92	Glory Johnson (15)	Glory Johnson (13)	Hodges, Diggins, & Williams (3)	Allstate Arena; 6811	0–4
5	June 7	@ Seattle	W 67–58	Glory Johnson (17)	Glory Johnson (9)	Johnson, Hodges, & Diggins (3)	Key Arena; 6879	1–4
6	June 8	@ Los Angeles	L 69–76 (OT)	Glory Johnson (17)	Glory Johnson (8)	Candice Wiggins (5)	Staples Center; 6110	1–5
7	June 14	Minnesota	L 74–83	Glory Johnson (22)	Glory Johnson (9)	Angel Goodrich (5)	BOK Center; 5273	1–6
8	June 16	Phoenix	L 103–108 (OT)	Glory Johnson (32)	Glory Johnson (15)	Skylar Diggins (8)	BOK Center; 4206	1–7
9	June 20	Chicago	W 83–74	Riquna Williams (21)	Glory Johnson (10)	Lacy & Diggins (4)	BOK Center; 4161	2–7
10	June 22	Seattle	W 92–70	Roneeka Hodges (19)	Glory Johnson (12)	Skylar Diggins (6)	BOK Center; 4327	3–7
11	June 23	@ Minnesota	L 79–88	Glory Johnson (24)	Glory Johnson (8)	Skylar Diggins (11)	Target Center; 8423	3–8
12	June 28	@ Indiana	L 69–80	Nicole Powell (21)	Glory Johnson (11)	Skylar Diggins (5)	Bankers Life Fieldhouse; 6957	3–9
13	June 30	@ Washington	L 61–84	Roneeka Hodges (16)	Johnson & Paris (7)	Diggins & Williams (3)	Verizon Center; 6511	3–10

July : 3–4 (Home: 2–3; Road: 1–1)

Game	Date	Team	Score	High points	High rebounds	High assists	Location Attendance	Record
14	July 2	@ Connecticut	L 69–88	Riquna Williams (23)	Glory Johnson (15)	Skylar Diggins (3)	Mohegan Sun Arena; 5701	3–11
15	July 11	Los Angeles	L 78–94	Skylar Diggins (19)	Tiffany Jackson-Jones (7)	Angel Goodrich (5)	BOK Center; 6278	3–12
16	July 13	Minnesota	L 75–86	Riquna Williams (22)	Liz Cambage (8)	Skylar Diggins (4)	BOK Center; 6171	3–13
17	July 17	@ Seattle	W 86–59	Riquna Williams (26)	Powell & Cambage (8)	Powell & Wiggins (4)	Key Arena; 9686	4–13
18	July 19	Connecticut	W 64–58	Glory Johnson (14)	Johnson & Cambage (17)	Candice Wiggins (2)	BOK Center; 5294	5–13
19	July 21	Atlanta	W 90–63	Glory Johnson (24)	Liz Cambage (15)	Nicole Powell (6)	BOK Center; 4107	6–13
20	July 25	Indiana	L 60–71	Liz Cambage (13)	Glory Johnson (5)	Johnson, Goodrich, & Williams (2)	BOK Center; 5018	6–14

August : 3–6 (Home: 2–2; Road: 1–4)

Game	Date	Team	Score	High points	High rebounds	High assists	Location Attendance	Record
All-Star Break
21	August 2	Los Angeles	W 96–89	Liz Cambage (28)	Liz Cambage (8)	Angel Goodrich (9)	BOK Center; 6168	7–14
22	August 4	@ San Antonio	L 65–69	Glory Johnson (19)	Glory Johnson (11)	Skylar Diggins (5)	AT&T Center; 7950	7–15
23	August 9	@ Phoenix	L 67–70	Liz Cambage (19)	Candice Wiggins (6)	Angel Goodrich (4)	US Airways Center; 8547	7–16
24	August 11	@ Phoenix	L 56–77	Cambage & Diggins (19)	Cambage & Paris (6)	Skylar Diggins (3)	US Airways Center; 5972	7–17
25	August 16	@ Minnesota	W 83–77	Liz Cambage (27)	Liz Cambage (8)	Angel Goodrich (8)	Target Center; 9422	8–17
26	August 20	Phoenix	L 86–89	Riquna Williams (23)	Liz Cambage (13)	Candice Wiggins (5)	BOK Center; 4261	8–18
27	August 23	San Antonio	W 73–67	Liz Cambage (20)	Liz Cambage (8)	Angel Goodrich (4)	BOK Center; 5923	9–18
28	August 25	@ Los Angeles	L 88–90 (2OT)	Candice Wiggins (20)	Liz Cambage (14)	Wiggins, Goodrich, & Williams (3)	Staples Center; 9973	9–19
29	August 30	San Antonio	L 65–74	Riquna Williams (18)	Glory Johnson (12)	Skylar Diggins (7)	BOK Center; 5452	9–20

September: 2–3 (Home: 1–2; Road: 1–1)

Game	Date	Team	Score	High points	High rebounds	High assists	Location Attendance	Record
30	September 1	NY Liberty	W 93–88	Candice Wiggins (25)	Courtney Paris (13)	Riquna Williams (6)	BOK Center; 5818	10–20
31	September 6	Los Angeles	L 70–74	Glory Johnson (19)	Courtney Paris (9)	Skylar Diggins (3)	BOK Center; 6704	10–21
32	September 8	@ San Antonio	W 98–65	Riquna Williams (51)	Courtney Paris (8)	Angel Goodrich (11)	AT&T Center; 6560	11–21
33	September 12	Seattle	L 67–76	Riquna Williams (17)	Tiffany Jackson-Jones (10)	Riquna Williams (4)	BOK Center; 6513	11–22
34	September 14	@ Seattle	L 73–85	Jennifer Lacy (21)	Riquna Williams (5)	Riquna Williams (4)	Key Arena; 8978	11–23

2013 season schedule

== Statistics ==
Legend
GP	Games played	GS	Games started	MPG	Minutes per game	RPG	Rebounds per game
APG	Assists per game	SPG	Steals per game	BPG	Blocks per game	PPG	Points per game
FG%	Field-goal percentage	3P%	3-point field-goal percentage	FT%	Free-throw percentage	TO	Turnovers per game
PF	Fouls per game		Team leader		League leader

=== Regular season ===
Player	GP	GS	MPG	FG%	3P%	FT%	RPG	APG	SPG	BPG	PPG
