= Skylar Diggins =

American basketball player (born 1990)

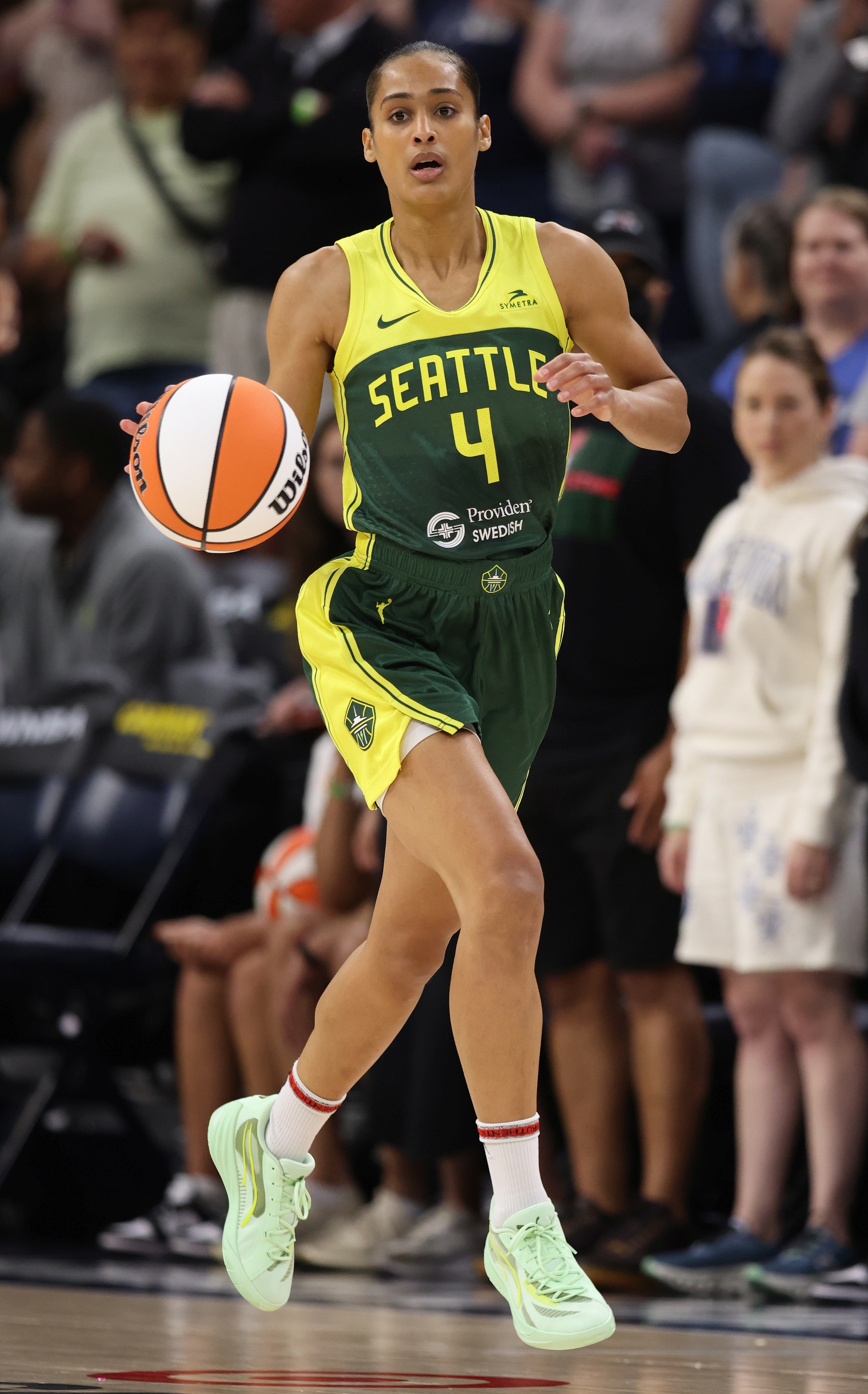
- Diggins with the Seattle Storm in 2024

No. 4 – Chicago Sky
- Position: Point guard
- League: WNBA

Personal information
- Born: August 2, 1990 (age 36) South Bend, Indiana, U.S.
- Listed height: 5 ft 9 in (1.75 m)
- Listed weight: 140 lb (64 kg)

Career information
- High school: Washington (South Bend, Indiana)
- College: Notre Dame (2009–2013)
- WNBA draft: 2013: 1st round, 3rd overall pick
- Drafted by: Tulsa Shock
- Playing career: 2013–Present

Career history
- 2013–2018: Tulsa Shock / Dallas Wings
- 2020–2022: Phoenix Mercury
- 2024–2025: Seattle Storm
- 2025–present: Lunar Owls BC
- 2026–present: Chicago Sky

Career highlights
- 7× WNBA All-Star (2014, 2015, 2017, 2018, 2021, 2022, 2025); 4× All-WNBA First Team (2014, 2017, 2021, 2022); 2× All-WNBA Second Team (2018, 2020); Dawn Staley Community Leadership Award (2018); WNBA Most Improved Player (2014); WNBA All-Rookie Team (2013); Unrivaled Second-team all-Unrivaled (2025); 2× Nancy Lieberman Award (2012, 2013); Dawn Staley Award (2013); 3× State Farm/WBCA Coaches' All-American (2011–2013); 2× All-American – USBWA (2012, 2013); 2× First-team All-American – AP (2012, 2013); Third-team All-American – AP (2011); 2× Big East Player of the Year (2012, 2013); 3× First-team All-Big East (2011–2013); Big East All-Freshman Team (2010); Naismith Prep Player of the Year (2009); MaxPreps National Player of the Year (2009); McDonald's All-American Game Co-MVP (2009); Indiana Miss Basketball (2009); Gatorade Female Athlete of the Year (2009); Gatorade National Player of the Year (2009)
- Stats at WNBA.com
- Stats at Basketball Reference
Medals
Women's basketball
Representing the United States
Olympic Games
Gold medal – first place	2020 Tokyo	Team
FIBA Under-19 World Cup
Gold medal – first place	2009 Thailand	Team
FIBA Under-18 Americas Championship
Gold medal – first place	2008 Argentina	Team
World University Games
Gold medal – first place	2011 Shenzhen	Team
Basketball 3x3
FIBA 3x3 World Cup
Gold medal – first place	2012 Greece	Team

Skylar Kierra Diggins (born August 2, 1990) is an American professional basketball player for the Chicago Sky of the Women's National Basketball Association (WNBA) and for the Lunar Owls of Unrivaled. Diggins was drafted third overall by the Tulsa Shock in the 2013 WNBA draft. In high school, she was the National Gatorade Player of the Year and the Gatorade Female Athlete of the Year. She played college basketball for the Notre Dame Fighting Irish and led the team to three consecutive Final Fours and two consecutive NCAA championship appearances. She finished her Notre Dame career ranked first in points and steals, second in assists, and as a two-time winner of the Nancy Lieberman Award as the top point guard in the nation.

== Early life ==
Diggins was born in South Bend, Indiana. She is the daughter of Tige Diggins and Renee Scott. Diggins has three younger brothers Tige, Destyn, and Maurice and one younger sister, Hanneaf. She also grew up playing softball.

Diggins was a four-year varsity basketball letter winner at Washington High School in South Bend, where the Panthers had a combined record of 102–7. Diggins led the Panthers to state championship games, including Washington's title-winning season of 2007, and finished her career with 2,790 points, the third-highest girls' scoring total in Indiana history for an average of 25.9 points per game. She received national honors, including the Naismith Prep Player of the Year, Gatorade National Player of the Year, Gatorade Female Athlete of the Year, and Miss Indiana Basketball. Diggins was named a WBCA All-American, and was a McDonald's All-American selection. She participated in the 2009 WBCA High School All-America Game, where she scored 24 points. In addition to basketball, she participated in volleyball and did well academically, earning High Academic Honors as a senior, and was a member of National Honor Society. In the March 30, 2009, issue of Sports Illustrated, she was part of its Faces in the Crowd segment. Diggins chose Notre Dame over Stanford, but was able to make friends with Stanford alum Candice Wiggins after visiting the university.

== College career ==
=== Freshman season ===
As a freshman, Diggins became the fourth Indiana native to join the Irish roster in 2009–10, and she was one of three Miss Basketball honorees on the 2009–10 Notre Dame roster. On November 15, 2009, Diggins made her collegiate debut for Notre Dame, recording 14 points, eight rebounds, five assists and four steals in a 102–57 win over Arkansas-Pine Bluff. During her freshman year, she set four Notre Dame freshman records. Her total points scored (484) were the fourth best ever by a freshman, and her 112 assists were the third most by a freshman. On March 23, Diggins recorded 31 points, six assists, and seven steals in an 84–66 win over 10th-seeded Vermont in the second round of the 2010 NCAA tournament. Her 31 points were the most by a Notre Dame player in their tournament debut.

=== Sophomore season ===
Diggins rose to national prominence in her sophomore year, leading the Irish to the second championship game appearance in school history, ten years after Notre Dame captured the national title in 2001. Diggins became the second Notre Dame women's basketball player to reach the 1,000-point milestone before the end of her sophomore season. She scored then season-high 24 points in a 73–59 win over fourth-ranked Tennessee in the Elite Eight to help Notre Dame reach its 3rd Final Four ever. She was recognized as MOP of the NCAA Dayton Regional. In the Final Four, Diggins recorded season-high 28 points, six assists, four rebounds, and 2 steals in a 72–63 victory against top-seeded UConn, the defending champions. In a 76–70 loss to Texas A&M Aggies at the national championship game, Diggins posted 23 points, 3 rebounds, 3 assists, 4 steals, and was named to the Final Four All-Tournament Team. However, she committed 6 turnovers, the last one ending Notre Dame's chances for good as the game clock wound down. As the Associated Press reported, "Diggins, fighting back tears, said the Irish couldn't handle A&M's pressure. 'We turned it over too much. I don't know if it was nerves or what,' she said. 'We just didn't handle the pressure.'" Diggins was a third-team All-American: she earned third-team All-American honors from the AP and the USBWA, and made the State Farm Coaches All-America Team.

=== Junior season ===
In her junior season, Diggins became the fourth NCAA Division I player in the past decade (since 2001–02) to register 600 points, 200 assists and 100 steals in a single season. She set a school record with 102 steals, while her 222 assists were third-most on the Notre Dame single-season list, and her 657 points ranked fourth on the school's single-season chart. After leading Notre Dame to the Big East regular-season title, she was named Big East Player of the Year. She was also a unanimous first-team All-Big East. On March 27, at the Elite Eight of the NCAA Tournament, Diggins recorded the first triple-double in Notre Dame postseason history with 22 points, 10 rebounds and 11 assists against Maryland. In their next game against UConn, she scored 19 points en route to earning their second straight championship appearance. In the national championship game, Diggins scored 20 as the Irish lost to Baylor 80–61. Diggins was a unanimous first-team All-American: she earned first-team All-American honors from the AP and the USBWA, and made the Women's Basketball Coaches Association (WBCA) Coaches' All-America Team. She was the first Notre Dame to win the Nancy Lieberman Award as the top point guard in the nation.

=== Senior season ===
In her final season at Notre Dame, Diggins posted career-high 33 points and five assists in a 77–67 victory over Tennessee. On February 24, Diggins recorded her second career triple-double with 17 points, 10 rebounds and 10 assists against DePaul. Diggins recorded 225 assists, the third most assists in school history. Her 114 steals was the most in a single season history. At the end of the regular season, she was named Big East Player of the Year for the second straight year and unanimous First Team All-Big East. In the Big East Tournament, Diggins was named to the All-Tournament team after leading the Irish to their first Big East championship game victory. She recorded 12 points, 6 assists, 5 steals and 3 rebounds defeating the UConn Huskies, came up with decisive steal with eight seconds left in a tie game, then weaved through three Connecticut defenders before passing off to Natalie Achonwa for a game-winning layup with 1.8 seconds remaining. Diggins scored a game-high 27 points in an 87–76 win over second-seeded Duke in the Elite Eight to help Notre Dame reach its 3rd straight Final Four. She was recognized as MOP of the Norfolk Regional. At the Final Four, Notre Dame was defeated by Big East rival UConn, 83–65, and finished the season with a 35–2 record. Diggins was named the Nancy Lieberman Award becoming the third player to win the award twice; was named a first-team All-American by the Associated Press and the USBWA, with the AP vote being unanimous. Diggins is the only Notre Dame basketball player (either gender) and one of only six NCAA Division I players since 1999–2000 to compile 2,000 points/500 rebounds/500 assists/300 steals in her career. She finished her career ranking first in points, steals, free throws made, free throws attempted, games started, minutes played, double-figure scoring games and triple-doubles, and second in school history for career assists, field goals made, field goals attempted and games played

== Professional career ==
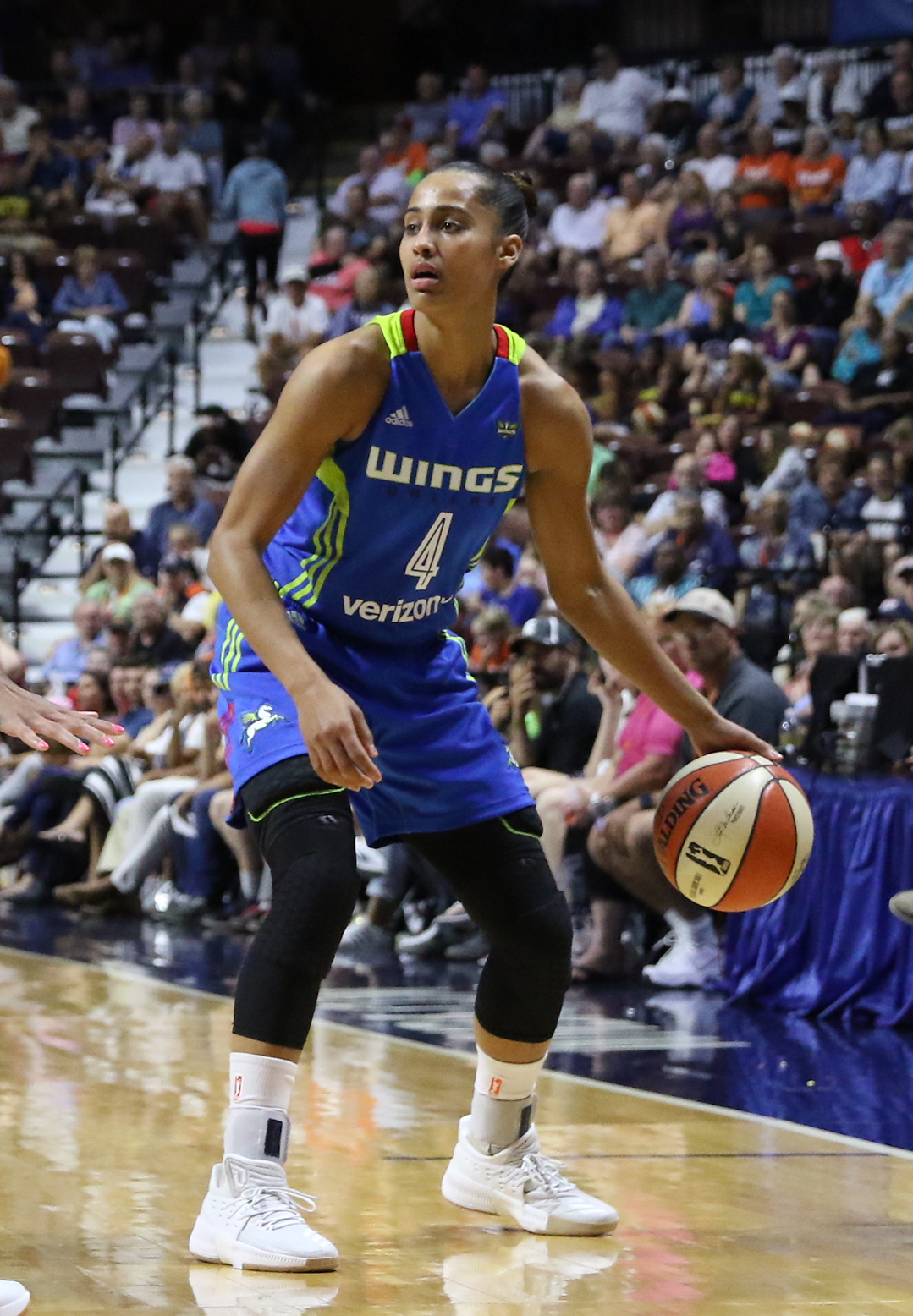
Diggins with the Dallas Wings in 2017

=== WNBA ===
==== Tulsa Shock / Dallas Wings (2013–2018) ====
In the 2013 WNBA draft, Diggins was drafted 3rd overall by the Tulsa Shock. Diggins averaged 8.5 points per game, 1.9 rebounds per game, 26.4 minutes per game and led the Shock in assists per game (3.8). She was named to the All-Rookie Team. Diggins had a breakout year in the 2014 WNBA season and was named a WNBA All-Star for the first time and was also voted as a starter. In a regular season game loss to the San Antonio Stars, Diggins scored a career-high 34 points. During the All-Star game, she had a team high 27 points including a lay-up that sent the game into overtime. She ranked second in league in scoring with 20.1 points per game, fourth in assists with 5.0 and tenth in steals with 1.5. Diggins passed former guard Deanna Nolan for the most points in a Shock season with 683 points. Diggins won the 2014 WNBA Most Improved Player Award.

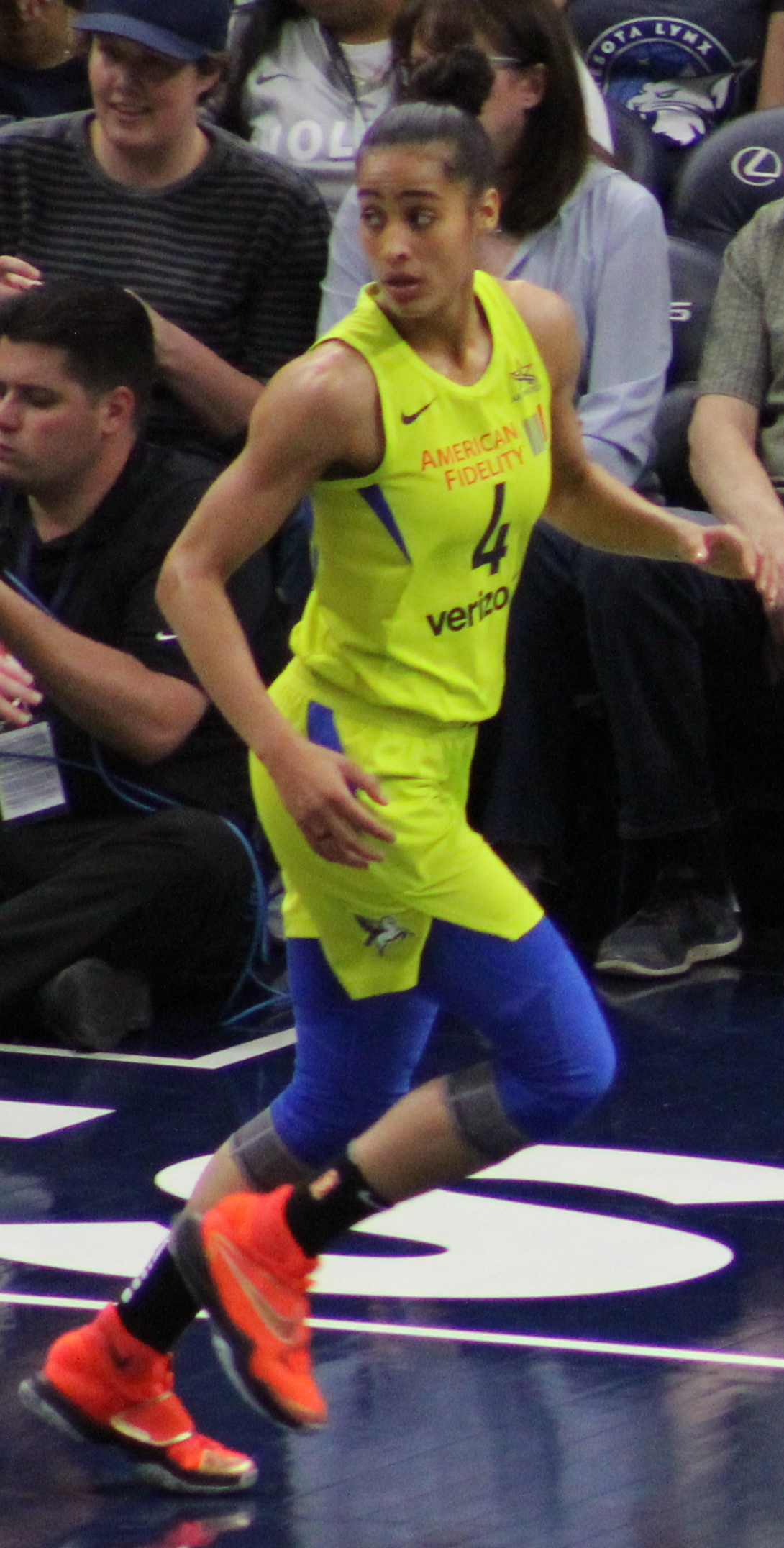
Diggins in 2018

On June 28, 2015, Diggins suffered a torn ACL with 44 seconds left in a regular season game victory against the Seattle Storm, she would miss the rest of the season, including the playoffs since the Shock had a playoff berth finishing 3rd in the western conference. They would get swept in the first round by the Phoenix Mercury. Diggins only played 9 games and averaged 17.8 points per game, she was named a WNBA all-star starter for the second year in a row despite missing the all-star game due to the torn ACL injury.

After recovering from a torn ACL injury, Diggins returned in time for the 2016 season, her first game back from injury was on May 21, 2016. By this time the Tulsa Shock had relocated to Dallas, Texas with the franchise being renamed the Dallas Wings. Diggins had also signed a multi-year contract extension with the Wings. She played 27 games and averaged 13.1 points per game throughout the season.

In the 2017 season, Diggins would play all 34 games of the season and return to peak form. She scored a season-high 30 points along with a franchise record 7 three-pointers in an 81–69 win over the San Antonio Stars. Diggins would then be voted into the 2017 WNBA All-Star Game. Diggins finished off the season averaging 18.5 ppg as well as a career-high in assists and rebounds, helping the Wings reach the playoffs as the number 7 seed in the league. In her first career playoff game, Diggins scored 15 points in a losing effort to the Washington Mystics of the first round elimination game.

On June 8, 2018, Diggins scored a new career-high of 35 points along with 12 rebounds in an 89–83 victory over the Indiana Fever. Diggins would be voted into the 2018 WNBA All-Star Game for her fourth all-star game appearance. Diggins would averaged a new career-high in assists. The Wings finished 15–19 with the number 8 seed in the league. They would lose in the first round elimination game yet again by a score of 101–83 to the Phoenix Mercury.

In 2019, Diggins opted to sit out the entire season after giving birth to her first child in April. Without Diggins, the Wings missed out on the playoffs with a disappointing 10–24 record. Days after the end of the 2019 season, Diggins confirmed on her twitter account that she had played the entire 2018 season while pregnant without telling anybody in response to the negative criticism she received for not playing. She had also mentioned that she had taken time away from basketball due to postpartum depression and expressed her displeasure with the Dallas Wings organization for their lack of support during her absence.

==== Phoenix Mercury (2020–2022) ====
In January 2020, Diggins announced that she wouldn't return and play for the Dallas Wings. In February 2020, Diggins was acquired by the Phoenix Mercury in a sign-and-trade deal for 2020 draft picks and a future first-round pick. The 2020 season was delayed and shortened to 22 games in a bubble at IMG Academy due to the COVID-19 pandemic. Diggins made her return on July 25, 2020, scoring 14 points along with 6 assists in a 99–76 loss to the Las Vegas Aces. On September 9, 2020, Diggins scored a season-high 33 points in a 100–95 overtime win against the Connecticut Sun. The Mercury finished 13–9 as the number 5 seed. In the first round elimination game, the Mercury won 85–84 against the defending champion Washington Mystics. In the second round elimination game, the Mercury were defeated by the Minnesota Lynx by a final score of 80–79.

==== Seattle Storm (2024–2025) ====
On February 1, 2024, Diggins signed a two-year deal with the Seattle Storm.

==== Chicago Sky (2026–present) ====
On April 11, 2026, Diggins signed a two-year contract with the Chicago Sky.

=== Unrivaled ===
On August 29, 2024, it was announced that Diggins would appear and play in the inaugural season of Unrivaled, a new women's 3-on-3 basketball league founded by Napheesa Collier and Breanna Stewart. On January 17, 2025, Diggins scored the game winning 3-point shot in the Lunar Owls' win over the Mist in the league opening game.

== National team career ==
Diggins was a member of the USA Women's U18 National Team, starting all five games at the 2008 FIBA U18 Americas Championship in Buenos Aires, Argentina. She was part of the United States team that went undefeated and won the gold medal. She averaged 10.8 points on 50-percent shooting from the field, 3.2 rebounds, 3.6 assists and 2.0 steals in 23.2 minutes per game. In the tournament, she ranked among the top 5 in scoring (1st), field goal percentage (7th), assists (1st), steals (1st) and assist-to-turnover ratio (1st).

Diggins played on the 2009 USA U19 World Championship Team that posted an 8–1 record in Bangkok, Thailand, and brought home the gold medal. She played in eight games and averaged 11.6 ppg., 3.0 rpg. and 1.9 apg. in 23.1 minutes a game.

Diggins again played for USA Basketball at the 2011 World University Games held in Shenzhen, China. They won all six games to earn the gold medal. She led the team in points, assists and steals in the game against Great Britain. Diggins was the third leading scorer on the team, with 74 points, and led the team in assists and steals with 29 and 20, respectively.

In September 2014, Diggins got the news that she didn't make the World Championship team after meeting with U.S. women's national team director Carol Callan and coach Geno Auriemma. She averaged 5.0 ppg. and 1.3 apg. in three USA National Team exhibition games and was one of the final three cuts.

On June 21, 2021, Diggins was named to the 12-player roster for Team USA for the 2020 summer Olympics. She and Team USA went on to win the gold medal in the tournament, defeating Japan 90–75 in the final.

== Career statistics ==
Legend
GP	Games played	GS	Games started	MPG	Minutes per game	RPG	Rebounds per game
APG	Assists per game	SPG	Steals per game	BPG	Blocks per game	PPG	Points per game
TO	Turnovers per game	FG%	Field-goal percentage	3P%	3-point field-goal percentage	FT%	Free-throw percentage
**Bold**	Career best	°	League leader

=== WNBA ===
==== Regular season ====
Stats current through end of 2026 season

WNBA regular season statistics
Year	Team	GP	GS	MPG	FG%	3P%	FT%	RPG	APG	SPG	BPG	TO	PPG
2013	Tulsa	32	21	28.7	.328	.244	.833	1.9	3.8	1.3	0.3	2.9	8.5
2014	Tulsa	34°	34°	**35.1**°	.424	.284	.842	2.5	5.0	1.5	0.6	2.9	**20.1**
2015	Tulsa	9	9	32.1	.405	.**448**	.**918**	2.7	5.0	1.6	0.3	2.0	17.8
2016	Dallas	27	25	28.3	.390	.299	.788	1.9	3.4	1.1	0.3	2.3	13.1
2017	Dallas	34	34	34.2°	.422	.350	.894	3.5	5.8	1.3	0.8	2.8	18.5
2018	Dallas	32	32	34.1°	.403	.297	.839	3.3	6.2	1.4	0.5	2.5	17.9
2019	Did not play (maternity leave)												
2020	Phoenix	22°	22°	30.7	**.474**	.397	.900	3.3	4.2	0.9	0.5	3.2	17.7
2021	Phoenix	32°	32°	32.5	.450	.370	.818	3.2	5.3	1.1	0.8	2.6	17.7
2022	Phoenix	30	30	34.0	.429	.296	.844	**4.0**	5.5	1.6	**1.0**	2.7	19.7
2023	Did not play (maternity leave)												
2024	Seattle	40°	40°	31.6	.427	.291	.867	2.6	**6.4**	**1.7**	0.9	2.8	15.1
2025	Seattle	**43**	**43**	31.2	.423	.365	.788	2.5	6.0	1.2	0.8	2.1	15.5
2026	Chicago	19	19	31.8	.392	.382	.775	2.5	4.9	0.9	0.6	**1.7**	14.2
**Career**	12 years, 5 teams	354	341	31.7	.418	.329	.840	2.9	5.3	1.3	0.7	2.6	16.3
**Career**	All-Star	6	1	19.1	.443	.364	.833	4.5	7.2	0.8	0.3	1.7	11.8

==== Playoffs ====
WNBA playoff statistics
Year	Team	GP	GS	MPG	FG%	3P%	FT%	RPG	APG	SPG	BPG	TO	PPG
2017	Dallas	1	1	34.6	.333	.200	**1.000**	2.0	3.0	0.0	0.0	**2.0**	5.4
2018	Dallas	1	1	**37.6**	**.421**	.167	**1.000**	2.0	7.0	0.0	0.0	5.0°	**23.0**
2020	Phoenix	2	2	36.5	.303	.231	.900	**5.0**	5.5	0.5	0.0	3.5°	16.0
2021	Phoenix	**11**	**11**	34.9	.368	.311	.741	3.6	6.1	1.0	0.5	2.3	13.9
2024	Seattle	2	2	36.0	.313	.300	**1.000**	2.0	**9.0**	**2.0**	**1.5**	**2.0**	14.5
2025	Seattle	3	3	32.3	.409	**.643**	.750	2.3	5.0	1.7	0.7	2.3	17.0
**Career**	5 years, 3 teams	20	20	35.0	.362	.330	.831	3.4	6.1	1.1	0.5	2.5	15.2

=== College ===
NCAA statistics
Year	Team	GP	Points	FG%	3P%	FT%	RPG	APG	SPG	BPG	PPG
2009–10	Notre Dame	35	484	43.9	35.0	78.2	**4.1**	3.2	2.6	0.7	13.8
2010–11	Notre Dame	**39**	585	43.2	33.3	73.2	4.0	4.8	1.9	0.4	15.0
2011–12	Notre Dame	**39**	**657**	**50.0**	35.5	78.6	3.3	5.7	2.6	0.5	16.8
2012–13	Notre Dame	37	631	42.3	**36.2**	**81.4**	3.5	**6.1**	**3.0**	0.7	**17.1**
**Career**		150	2357	44.8	35.0	77.8	3.7	5.0	2.5	0.6	15.7

== Off the court ==
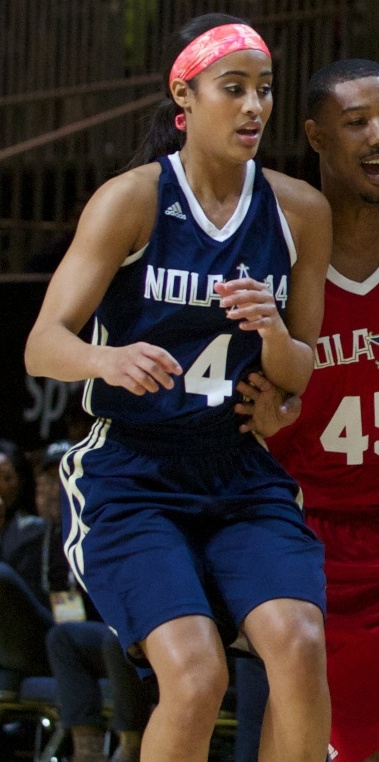
Diggins playing in the 2014 NBA All-Star Celebrity game (Michael B. Jordan also pictured)

Diggins has become an advocate against childhood obesity, a guest interviewer for ESPN, and a model for Nike. She has appeared in Vogue and in a swimsuit shoot for Sports Illustrated.

Starting with the 2020-21 NBA season, Diggins has also been a guest broadcast team member for the Phoenix Suns.

Diggins also hosts "Shoot 4 The Sky" camps around the world for boys and girls grades 2–12.

=== Personal life ===
Diggins has a degree from Notre Dame's Mendoza College of Business. In June 2016, Diggins got engaged to her longtime boyfriend Daniel Smith who is a former Clay High School and Notre Dame wide receiver. The couple got married in May 2017, and she changed her last name to Diggins-Smith. The couple have two children together. As of April 25, 2025, Skylar was not using Smith in her last name for Seattle Storm's training camp roster. Skylar is now going by Skylar Diggins in the WNBA. On May 1, 2025, it was reported that Diggins filed for divorce from Smith on March 26, 2025, after the couple separated back in November 2024, stating that their marriage was "irretrievably broken".

=== Endorsement deals ===
In 2013, Diggins signed with Roc Nation Sports, becoming the first female athlete to do so. That same year, she also signed an endorsement deal with Nike. In 2014, Diggins signed an endorsement deal with Bodyarmor SuperDrink.

== Awards and honors ==
=== WNBA ===
- 7× WNBA All-Star (2014, 2015, 2017, 2018, 2021, 2022, 2025)
- 4× All-WNBA First Team (2014, 2017, 2021, 2022)
- 2× All-WNBA Second Team (2018, 2020)
- Dawn Staley Community Leadership Award (2018)
- WNBA Most Improved Player (2014)
- WNBA All-Rookie Team (2013)
- WNBA turnovers leader (2020)

=== College ===
- Dawn Staley Award (2013)
- 2× Nancy Lieberman Award (2012, 2013)
- 2× Big East Conference Women's Basketball Player of the Year (2012, 2013)

=== High school ===
- 2009 consensus Naismith Prep Player of the Year, earning top honors from Gatorade, Atlanta Tipoff Club (Naismith Trophy), ESPN Hoopgurlz and MaxPreps
- Three-time high school All-American by Parade magazine (first team 2008 and 2009; third team 2007)
- Three-time high school All-American by EA Sports (first team 2008 and 2009; second team 2007)
- USA Today All-USA Team (first team 2009; third team 2008)
- USA Today All-Underclass Team (2006)
- Two-time Gatorade Indiana Player of the Year (2008 and 2009)
- Two-time MaxPreps Indiana Player of the Year/first-team All-American (2008 and 2009)
- 2009 Indiana Miss Basketball
- 2009 South Bend Tribune Girls' Athlete of the Year (covers all female high school athletes in all sports throughout newspaper's coverage area)

== Filmography ==
=== TV ===
Year	Title	Role	Notes
2014	Wild 'n Out	Herself	Team Captain
2017	Little Ballers Indiana	Herself	Co-executive producer

== See also ==
- List of WNBA career assists leaders
- List of WNBA career free throw scoring leaders
- List of WNBA career scoring leaders
- List of WNBA career turnovers leaders
