= 2014 WNBA season =

- League: Women's National Basketball Association
- Sport: Basketball
- Duration: May 16 – September 12, 2014
- Games: 34
- Teams: 12
- Total attendance: 1,545,890
- Average attendance: 7,578
- TV partner(s): ABC, ESPN, ESPN2, NBA TV

Draft
- Top draft pick: (United States) Chiney Ogwumike
- Picked by: Connecticut Sun

Regular season
- Top seed: Phoenix Mercury
- Season MVP: (United States) Maya Moore (Minnesota)
- Top scorer: (United States) Maya Moore (Minnesota)

Playoffs
- Finals champions: Phoenix Mercury
- Runners-up: Chicago Sky
- Finals MVP: (United States) Diana Taurasi (Phoenix)

WNBA seasons
- ← 2013 2015 →

The 2014 WNBA season was the 18th season of the Women's National Basketball Association. The season started in May and concluded in September to accommodate the 2014 Women's World Championship.

== Notable occurrences ==
- The New York Liberty returned to the renovated Madison Square Garden after three years of playing at the Prudential Center in Newark, New Jersey.
- Indiana Fever head coach Lin Dunn announced her retirement on May 8; effective at the end of the season.

== Draft ==
On December 12, 2013, the 2014 WNBA Draft Lottery took place. The Connecticut Sun, who had a league-worst record of 10-24 last season, won the draft lottery and had the right to pick first in the 2014 draft. In the draft, held on April 14, the Sun made Chiney Ogwumike of Stanford University the top pick.

== Media coverage ==
Games aired on ESPN, ESPN2, ABC and NBA TV. The Washington Mystics made history in May 2014 when they debuted Kiswe Mobile's Mystics Live and became the first U.S. professional sports team to stream live games within the venue via a mobile application.

== Regular season ==
The timing of the 2014 WNBA schedule and the draft were not finalized at its normal timeframe, as the league and players were negotiating a new collective bargaining agreement during the 2013 season. The previous agreement expired during the 2013 WNBA Finals and a new CBA was reached on February 17, 2014.

On February 6, 2014, the 2014 regular season schedule was announced. The regular season schedule began on May 16 and concluded on August 17.

It was announced on January 22 that the 2014 WNBA All-Star Game would take place on July 19 at 3:00 PM EDT in Phoenix, Arizona.

=== Standings ===
Eastern Conference

#	Eastern Conference					
#	Team	W	L	PCT	GB	GP
1	y- Atlanta Dream	19	15	.559	-	34
2	x- Indiana Fever	16	18	.471	3.0	34
3	x-Washington Mystics	16	18	.471	3.0	34
4	x-Chicago Sky	15	19	.441	4.0	34
5	e-New York Liberty	15	19	.441	4.0	34
6	e-Connecticut Sun	13	21	.382	6.0	34

Western Conference

#	Western Conference					
#	Team	W	L	PCT	GB	GP
1	y-Phoenix Mercury	29	5	.853	-	34
2	x-Minnesota Lynx	25	9	.735	4.0	34
3	x-San Antonio Stars	16	18	.471	13.0	34
4	x-Los Angeles Sparks	16	18	.471	13.0	34
5	e-Tulsa Shock	12	22	.353	17.0	34
6	e-Seattle Storm	12	22	.353	17.0	34

== Playoffs ==
**Conference semifinals** Best-of-3
E1	Atlanta	1
E4	**Chicago**	**2**
**Eastern Conference**
E2	**Indiana**	**2**
E3	Washington	0
W1	**Phoenix**	**2**
W4	Los Angeles	0
**Western Conference**
W2	**Minnesota**	**2**
W3	San Antonio	0

**Conference finals** Best-of-3
E4	**Chicago**	**2**
E2	Indiana	1
W1	**Phoenix**	**2**
W2	Minnesota	1

**WNBA Finals**; Best-of-5
E4	Chicago	0
W1	**Phoenix**	**3**

- **Bold** – Series winner
- Italics – Team with home-court advantage

== Awards ==
=== Individual ===
Award		Winner	Team	Position	Votes/Statistic
Most Valuable Player (MVP)		Maya Moore	Minnesota Lynx	Forward	35 out of 38
Finals MVP		Diana Taurasi	Phoenix Mercury	Guard	
Rookie of the Year		Chiney Ogwumike	Connecticut Sun	Forward	23 out of 38
Most Improved Player		Skylar Diggins	Tulsa Shock	Guard	29 out of 38
Defensive Player of the Year		Brittney Griner	Phoenix Mercury	Center	31 out of 38
Sixth Woman of the Year		Allie Quigley	Chicago Sky	Guard	26 out of 38
Kim Perrot Sportsmanship Award		Becky Hammon	San Antonio Stars	Guard	24 out of 37
Peak Performers	**Scoring**	Maya Moore	Minnesota Lynx	Forward	23.9 PPG
Peak Performers	**Rebounding**	Courtney Paris	Tulsa Shock	Center	10.2 RPG
Peak Performers	**Assists**	Diana Taurasi	Phoenix Mercury	Guard	5.6 APG
Coach of the Year		Sandy Brondello	Phoenix Mercury	Coach	33 out of 38

=== Team ===
Award		Guard	Guard	Forward	Forward	Center
All-WNBA	**First Team**	Skylar Diggins	Diana Taurasi	Maya Moore	Candace Parker	Brittney Griner
All-WNBA	**Second Team**	Danielle Robinson	Seimone Augustus	Angel McCoughtry	Nneka Ogwumike	Tina Charles
All-WNBA	**Second Team**	Lindsay Whalen	Seimone Augustus	Angel McCoughtry	Nneka Ogwumike	Tina Charles
All-Defensive	**First Team**	Briann January	Tanisha Wright	Angel McCoughtry	Sancho Lyttle	Brittney Griner
All-Defensive	**Second Team**	Danielle Robinson	Alana Beard	Maya Moore	Tamika Catchings	Sylvia Fowles
All-Rookie Team		Odyssey Sims	Bria Hartley	Kayla McBride	Alyssa Thomas	Chiney Ogwumike

=== Players of the Week ===
Week ending	Eastern Conference		Western Conference		Ref.
Week ending	Player	Team	Player	Team	Ref.
May 25	Elena Delle Donne	Chicago Sky	Maya Moore	Minnesota Lynx	
June 1	Briann January	Indiana Fever	Lindsay Whalen	Minnesota Lynx	
June 8	Erika de Souza	Atlanta Dream	Diana Taurasi	Phoenix Mercury	
June 15	Alex Bentley	Connecticut Sun	Skylar Diggins	Tulsa Shock	
June 22	Angel McCoughtry	Atlanta Dream	Brittney Griner	Phoenix Mercury	
June 29	Sancho Lyttle	Atlanta Dream	Nneka Ogwumike	Los Angeles Sparks	
July 6	Tina Charles	New York Liberty	Diana Taurasi (2)	Phoenix Mercury	
July 13	Angel McCoughtry (2)	Atlanta Dream	Maya Moore (5)	Minnesota Lynx	
July 18	Tamika Catchings	Indiana Fever	Maya Moore (5)	Minnesota Lynx	
July 27	Ivory Latta	Washington Mystics	Maya Moore (5)	Minnesota Lynx	
August 3	Tina Charles (2)	New York Liberty	Maya Moore (5)	Minnesota Lynx	
August 10	Allie Quigley	Chicago Sky	Brittney Griner (2)	Phoenix Mercury	
August 17	Shoni Schimmel	Atlanta Dream	Kristi Toliver	Los Angeles Sparks	

=== Players of the Month ===
Month	Eastern Conference		Western Conference		Ref.
Month	Player	Team	Player	Team	Ref.
May	Elena Delle Donne	Chicago Sky	Maya Moore	Minnesota Lynx	
June	Angel McCoughtry	Atlanta Dream	Diana Taurasi	Phoenix Mercury	
July	Tina Charles	New York Liberty	Maya Moore (3)	Minnesota Lynx	
August	Tamika Catchings	Indiana Fever	Maya Moore (3)	Minnesota Lynx	

=== Rookies of the Month ===
Month	Player	Team	Ref.
May	Chiney Ogwumike (2)	Connecticut Sun	
June	Chiney Ogwumike (2)	Connecticut Sun	
July	Odyssey Sims (2)	Tulsa Shock	
August	Odyssey Sims (2)	Tulsa Shock	

== Coaches ==
=== Eastern Conference ===
- Atlanta Dream: Michael Cooper
- Chicago Sky: Pokey Chatman
- Connecticut Sun: Anne Donovan
- Indiana Fever: Lin Dunn
- New York Liberty: Bill Laimbeer
- Washington Mystics: Mike Thibault

=== Western Conference ===
- Los Angeles Sparks: Carol Ross and Penny Toler
- Minnesota Lynx: Cheryl Reeve
- Phoenix Mercury: Sandy Brondello
- San Antonio Stars: Dan Hughes
- Seattle Storm: Jenny Boucek
- Tulsa Shock: Fred Williams

== See also ==
- WNBA
- WNBA draft
- WNBA All-Star Game
- WNBA Playoffs
- WNBA Finals
