= 2013 WNBA season =

- League: Women's National Basketball Association
- Sport: Basketball
- Duration: May 24 – October 10, 2013
- Games: 34
- Teams: 12
- Total attendance: 1,536,259
- Average attendance: 7,531
- TV partner(s): ABC, ESPN, ESPN2, NBA TV

Draft
- Top draft pick: (United States) Brittney Griner
- Picked by: Phoenix Mercury

Regular season
- Top seed: Minnesota Lynx
- Season MVP: (United States) Candace Parker (Los Angeles)
- Top scorer: (United States) Angel McCoughtry (Atlanta)

Playoffs
- Finals champions: Minnesota Lynx
- Runners-up: Atlanta Dream
- Finals MVP: (United States) Maya Moore (Minnesota)

WNBA seasons
- ← 2012 2014 →

The 2013 WNBA season was the 17th season of the Women's National Basketball Association. The regular season began on May 24 and concluded on September 15, and playoffs started on September 19 and concluded on October 10. The Minnesota Lynx won their second league championship, defeating the Atlanta Dream three games to none in the 2013 WNBA Finals. The year represented a positive turning point for the long-struggling league. Both attendance and television viewership were up, driven by an influx of talented rookies, multiple teams reported that they were near a break-even point, and at least one franchise announced that it was profitable.

== Draft ==
The WNBA Draft lottery was held on September 26, 2012. The lottery teams were the Washington Mystics, Phoenix Mercury, Tulsa Shock and Chicago Sky. The top pick was awarded to Phoenix Mercury. Center Brittney Griner was drafted first overall by the Phoenix Mercury.

== Media coverage ==
About 70+ games were aired on ESPN2, ABC and NBA TV. WNBA LiveAccess will offer complement - approximately 190 live games.

== Regular season ==
The WNBA had three promising rookies: Brittney Griner of the Phoenix Mercury, Elena Delle Donne of the Chicago Sky, and Skylar Diggins of the Tulsa Shock as "three to see" going into the 2013 season. Griner, a 6’8” center who had been dominant in college, was seen as such a potential game-changer that many picked the Mercury to win the WNBA championship.

It was Delle Donne, however, who turned out to have the breakout season, leading the Sky to the best record in the Eastern Conference, and their first trip to the playoffs. Griner was slowed by injuries, but her Phoenix team finished third in the West, and made it to the conference finals.

The Minnesota Lynx finished with the best record in the WNBA for the third consecutive season, behind the play of Seimone Augustus, Lindsay Whalen, and Maya Moore.

Joining the Sky in the playoffs were the defending WNBA champion Indiana Fever, who finished fourth after surviving a rash of injuries during the season; the Atlanta Dream, led by league scoring champion Angel McCoughtry; and the Washington Mystics, who were hoping to win their first playoff game since 2004.

The Los Angeles Sparks finished second in the West, behind the play of league MVP Candace Parker. They lost to Phoenix in the conference semifinals. Finally, the Seattle Storm surprised many by earning the final entry into the playoffs, allowing veteran and future hall-of-famer Tina Thompson to retire from a playoff team.

=== Standings ===
#	Eastern Conference					
#	Team	W	L	PCT	GB	GP
1	z-Chicago Sky	24	10	.706	-	34
2	x-Atlanta Dream	17	17	.500	7	34
3	x-Washington Mystics	17	17	.500	7	34
4	x-Indiana Fever	16	18	.471	8	34
5	e-New York Liberty	11	23	.324	13	34
6	e-Connecticut Sun	10	24	.294	14	34

#	Western Conference					
#	Team	W	L	PCT	GB	GP
1	z-Minnesota Lynx	26	8	.765	-	34
2	x-Los Angeles Sparks	24	10	.706	2	34
3	x-Phoenix Mercury	19	15	.559	7	34
4	x-Seattle Storm	17	17	.500	9	34
5	e-San Antonio Silver Stars	12	22	.353	14	34
6	e-Tulsa Shock	11	23	.324	15	34

== Playoffs ==
The opening round of the WNBA playoffs saw a rash of road team victories. Only the Minnesota Lynx and Indiana Fever went unbeaten on their home floors. The Chicago Sky, the top overall seed in the East, were swept by the Fever, while the Seattle Storm lost to the top-seeded Lynx in two games. In the Atlanta–Washington series, the road team won the first two games of the series, before Atlanta finally prevailed at home. Finally, in the matchup between the Phoenix Mercury and Los Angeles Sparks, the road teams went 3–0, with Phoenix advancing.

The conference finals were over quickly. Both the Atlanta Dream and Minnesota Lynx swept their opponents, setting up a rematch of the 2011 WNBA Finals. In the Finals, the Lynx once again swept the Dream, becoming the second WNBA team to sweep through the playoffs since the best-of-five finals format was adopted.

**Conference semifinals** Best-of-3
E1	Chicago	0
E4	**Indiana**	**2**
Eastern Conference
E2	**Atlanta**	**2**
E3	Washington	1
W1	**Minnesota**	**2**
W4	Seattle	0
Western Conference
W2	Los Angeles	1
W3	**Phoenix**	**2**

**Conference finals** Best-of-3
E4	Indiana	0
E2	**Atlanta**	**2**
W1	**Minnesota**	**2**
W3	Phoenix	0

**WNBA Finals**; Best-of-5
E2	Atlanta	0
W1	**Minnesota**	**3**

- **Bold** – Series winner
- Italics – Team with home-court advantage

== Awards ==
=== Individual ===
Award		Winner	Team	Position	Votes/Statistic
Most Valuable Player (MVP)		Candace Parker	Los Angeles Sparks	Forward	10 out of 39
Finals MVP		Maya Moore	Minnesota Lynx	Forward	
Rookie of the Year		Elena Delle Donne	Chicago Sky	Forward	Unanimous
Most Improved Player		Shavonte Zellous	Indiana Fever	Guard	30 out of 39
Defensive Player of the Year		Sylvia Fowles	Chicago Sky	Center	21 out of 29
Sixth Woman of the Year		Riquna Williams	Tulsa Shock	Guard	17 out of 39
Kim Perrot Sportsmanship Award (co-winners)		Swin Cash	Chicago Sky	Forward	7 out of 39
Kim Perrot Sportsmanship Award (co-winners)		Tamika Catchings	Indiana Fever	Forward	7 out of 39
Peak Performers	Scoring	Angel McCoughtry	Atlanta Dream	Guard/Forward	21.5 PPG
Peak Performers	Rebounding	Sylvia Fowles	Chicago Sky	Center	11.5 RPG
Peak Performers	Assists	Danielle Robinson	San Antonio Silver Stars	Guard	6.7 APG
Coach of the Year		Mike Thibault	Washington Mystics	Coach	11 of 39

=== Team ===
Award		Forward	Forward	Forward/center	Guard	Guard
All-WNBA	First Team	Maya Moore	Candace Parker	Sylvia Fowles	Diana Taurasi	Lindsay Whalen
All-WNBA	Second Team	Tamika Catchings	Elena Delle Donne	Tina Charles	Seimone Augustus	Angel McCoughtry
All-Defensive	First Team	Tamika Catchings	Angel McCoughtry	Sylvia Fowles	Armintie Herrington	Tanisha Wright
All-Defensive	Second Team	Rebekkah Brunson	Glory Johnson	Erika de Souza	Briann January	Jia Perkins; Danielle Robinson
All-Rookie Team		Elena Delle Donne	Kelsey Bone	Brittney Griner	Alex Bentley	Skylar Diggins

=== Players of the Week ===
The following players were named the Eastern and Western Conference Players of the Week.

Week ending	Eastern Conference		Western Conference	
Week ending	Player	Team	Player	Team
June 2	Angel McCoughtry	Atlanta Dream	Candace Parker	Los Angeles Sparks
June 9	Ivory Latta	Washington Mystics	Rebekkah Brunson	Minnesota Lynx
June 16	Angel McCoughtry (3)	Atlanta Dream	Diana Taurasi	Phoenix Mercury
June 23	Angel McCoughtry (3)	Atlanta Dream	Glory Johnson	Tulsa Shock
June 30	Elena Delle Donne (2)	Chicago Sky	Diana Taurasi (2)	Phoenix Mercury
July 7	Elena Delle Donne (2)	Chicago Sky	Candace Parker (3)	Los Angeles Sparks
July 14	Sylvia Fowles	Chicago Sky	Candace Parker (3)	Los Angeles Sparks
July 21	Tamika Catchings	Indiana Fever	Liz Cambage	Tulsa Shock
July 28	Ivory Latta (2)	Washington Mystics	Tina Thompson	Seattle Storm
August 4	Tina Charles	Connecticut Sun	Liz Cambage (2)	Tulsa Shock
August 11	Elena Delle Donne (3)	Chicago Sky	Maya Moore	Minnesota Lynx
August 18	Sylvia Fowles (2)	Chicago Sky	Kristi Toliver	Los Angeles Sparks
August 25	Elena Delle Donne (4)	Chicago Sky	Maya Moore (2)	Minnesota Lynx
September 1	Tamika Catchings (2)	Indiana Fever	Tina Thompson (2)	Seattle Storm
September 8	Angel McCoughtry (4)	Atlanta Dream	Riquna Williams	Tulsa Shock
September 15	Ivory Latta (3)	Washington Mystics	Tina Thompson (3)	Seattle Storm

=== Players of the Month ===
The following players were named the Eastern and Western Conference Players of the Month.

Month	Eastern Conference		Western Conference	
Month	Player	Team	Player	Team
June	Angel McCoughtry	Atlanta Dream	Diana Taurasi	Phoenix Mercury
July	Sylvia Fowles (3)	Chicago Sky	Candace Parker	Los Angeles Sparks
August	Sylvia Fowles (3)	Chicago Sky	Maya Moore (2)	Minnesota Lynx
September	Sylvia Fowles (3)	Chicago Sky	Maya Moore (2)	Minnesota Lynx

=== Rookies of the Month ===
The following player was named the Rookie of the Month for each month.

Month	Player	Team
June	Elena Delle Donne (4)	Chicago Sky
July	Elena Delle Donne (4)	Chicago Sky
August	Elena Delle Donne (4)	Chicago Sky
September	Elena Delle Donne (4)	Chicago Sky

== Coaches ==
=== Eastern Conference ===
- Atlanta Dream: Fred Williams
- Chicago Sky: Pokey Chatman
- Connecticut Sun: Anne Donovan
- Indiana Fever: Lin Dunn
- New York Liberty: Bill Laimbeer
- Washington Mystics: Mike Thibault

=== Western Conference ===
- Los Angeles Sparks: Carol Ross
- Minnesota Lynx: Cheryl Reeve
- Phoenix Mercury: Corey Gaines and Russ Pennell
- San Antonio Silver Stars: Dan Hughes
- Seattle Storm: Brian Agler
- Tulsa Shock: Gary Kloppenburg

== See also ==
- WNBA
- WNBA draft
- WNBA All-Star Game
- WNBA playoffs
- WNBA Finals
