= Tulsa Shock =

Basketball team in Oklahoma, United States

- Conference: Western
- Leagues: WNBA
- Founded: 1998
- History: Detroit Shock (1998–2009); Tulsa Shock (2010–2015); Dallas Wings (2016–present)
- Arena: BOK Center
- Capacity: 17,839
- Location: Tulsa, Oklahoma
- Team colors: Gold, black, white, blood red
- Main sponsor: Osage Casino
- General manager: Steve Swetoha
- Head coach: Fred Williams
- Assistant: Ed Baldwin; Bridget Pettis
- Ownership: Tulsa Pro Hoops LLC
- Championships: 3 (2003, 2006, 2008)
- Conference titles: 4 (2003, 2006, 2007, 2008)
- Website: shock.wnba.com
Home	Away

The Tulsa Shock were a professional basketball team based in Tulsa, Oklahoma, playing in the Western Conference in the Women's National Basketball Association (WNBA). The team was founded in Detroit, Michigan before the 1998 WNBA season began; the team moved to Tulsa before the 2010 season. The team was owned by Tulsa Pro Hoops LLC, which is led by Bill Cameron and David Box. On July 20, 2015, Cameron announced that the franchise would move to Arlington, Texas for the 2016 WNBA season, rebranding as the Dallas Wings.

The Shock qualified for the WNBA Playoffs in their final year in Tulsa in 2015. The franchise has been home to players such as shooting guard Deanna Nolan, women's professional basketball all-time leading scorer Katie Smith, NBA Hall of Fame forward Karl Malone's daughter Cheryl Ford, and Australian center Liz Cambage. In 2003, 2006, 2007, and 2008 (as Detroit in the Eastern Conference), the Shock went to the WNBA Finals; they won in 2003, 2006 and 2008, beating Los Angeles, Sacramento, and San Antonio, respectively. They lost in 2007 to Phoenix.

== Franchise history ==
=== 1998–2009: The Detroit Shock ===
==== 1998–2002: The early years ====
The Shock were one of the first WNBA expansion teams and began play in 1998. The Shock quickly brought in a blend of rookies and veterans. The team only qualified for the postseason once in its first five years of existence. The Shock went through two coaches (hall of famer Nancy Lieberman and Greg Williams) before hiring former Detroit Pistons legend Bill Laimbeer. There were rumors the Shock would fold after the team's awful 2002 season. Laimbeer convinced the owners to keep the team for another year, certain that he could turn things around.

==== 2003–2008: The Bill Laimbeer era ====
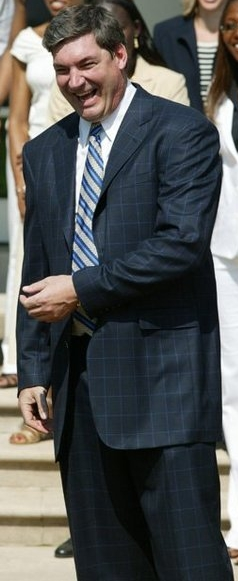
Bill Laimbeer

After massive changes to the roster, Laimbeer predicted before the 2003 season that the Shock would be league champions, and his prediction would unbelievably come true. The Shock finished with a 25–9 record and winning the number one seed by seven games. In the playoffs, the Shock defeated the Cleveland Rockers and the Connecticut Sun to reach the WNBA Finals. Despite the achievements, the Shock were viewed as huge underdogs to the two-time defending champion Los Angeles Sparks. The Shock emerged victorious in the series, winning a thrilling game three (in 2003, the Finals were a best-of-three series), which drew the largest crowd in WNBA history (22,076). Detroit became the first team in league history to go from last place one season to WNBA champions the very next season.

After coming up short in 2004 and 2005, the 2006 Shock finished 23–11 record and finished number two in the Eastern Conference. The Shock defeated the Indiana Fever and the Connecticut Sun to advance to the Finals again, where they faced the defending champion Sacramento Monarchs. The Shock won the series 3–2, and claimed their second WNBA title.

In 2007, the Shock again advanced to the Finals but were defeated by the Phoenix Mercury in five games. The 2008 Shock posted a 22–12 regular season record, the best record in the East yet again. In the Finals, the Shock faced the San Antonio Silver Stars, who had not lost to an Eastern Conference team all season. Surprisingly, Detroit swept San Antonio, capturing their third championship in franchise history.

==== 2009: The final Detroit Shock season ====
The Shock were named favorites for 2009, but they had a rough road getting there. Bill Laimbeer resigned as head coach early in the season, and they even found themselves in the bottom of the standings. However, interim coach Rick Mahorn and the Shock bounced back in the second half of 2009 and eventually placed themselves in the playoffs for the seventh straight year at 18–16. The Shock lost in the second round to the Indiana Fever, failing to reach the Finals for the first time since 2005.

=== 2010–2015: The Tulsa Shock ===
==== 2010: Relocation ====
Tulsa had been mentioned as a possible future city for WNBA expansion, but efforts did not come together until the middle of 2009. An organizing committee with Tulsa businesspeople and politicians began the effort to attract an expansion team. The group was originally given a September 1 deadline. WNBA President Donna Orender extended that deadline to sometime in October. The investment group hired former University of Arkansas head coach Nolan Richardson as the potential franchise general manager and head coach. Richardson was a local favorite; before his successful 18-year stint at Arkansas, he had spent five years as head coach at the University of Tulsa, leading them to the NIT title in his first year. This move was viewed as strange by some, considering that Tulsa had not even secured a franchise before hiring a coach. The investors claimed it was to show the league they were serious about wanting a team. On October 15, 2009, the group made its official request to join the league.

On October 20, 2009, WNBA President Donna Orender, lead investors Bill Cameron and David Box, Tulsa mayor Kathy Taylor, Oklahoma governor Brad Henry, and head coach Nolan Richardson were present for a press conference announcing that the Detroit Shock would relocate to Tulsa. On January 23, 2010, the franchise announced that the team will remain as the Shock. The colors are now black, red, and gold.

==== 2010–2014: Tough times ====
The Shock team that moved to Tulsa was much different than what investors thought they were purchasing. Detroit's four best players did not make the move to Tulsa. Cheryl Ford decided to sit out due to lingering injuries and eventually left the WNBA to play overseas. Taj McWilliams-Franklin signed a free agent contract with New York. Deanna Nolan, like Ford, left the WNBA to play in Russia. Katie Smith, who was believed to be contracted with the Shock (which only turned out to be a verbal agreement), signed with Washington. Along with all the absences, new head coach and general manager Nolan Richardson had his own ideas about what he wanted the roster to look like and by the middle of the 2010 season, there were no Detroit players left on the team.

Richardson's first draft pick, Amanda Thompson, was a bust; she only played seven games (no starts) and was waived only a month into the season. Another key signing, fallen Olympic track star Marion Jones, turned out to be less than hoped for as well; she hadn't played a meaningful basketball game since her days at North Carolina 13 years earlier.

A lack of continuity plagued the team; at times it seemed Richardson made roster moves on a game-to-game basis. The players also found it difficult to adjust to Richardson's frenetic "40 minutes of hell" style. The Shock finished with an awful 6–28 record, dead last in the league. They missed the playoffs for the first time since 2002 in Detroit. Losing valuable players and getting off to a bad start meant the Shock qualified for the draft lottery, and they were awarded the number two pick in the 2011 Draft.

The Shock selected 19-year-old Australian center Liz Cambage with hopes to build a successful team around her. The team also signed veteran and one of the original WNBA players, Sheryl Swoopes. The roster changes were not enough, however, and after the team started the season with a dreadful 1-10 record, head coach Richardson stepped down. Assistant coach Teresa Edwards took his place on an interim basis. Jones was waived a few days later. Things did not improve for the Shock, who entered the All-Star break with a 1–14 record. Later in the season, the Shock set a new mark for futility when they embarked on a 20-game losing streak, the longest losing streak in the history of the WNBA.

In 2012, the misery continued as the team began the season 1–11, going on to finish 9–25. The team would finish with slightly better records of 11-23 in 2013 and 12-22 in 2014.

==== 2015: Success, Tulsa's final season and relocation to Arlington, Texas ====
The 2015 Shock started off well, with the team starting 10–7, including a 6–1 record at the BOK Center. However, in June, point guard Skylar Diggins suffered a knee injury and missed the rest of the season. On July 20, 2015, majority owner Bill Cameron shocked not just fans in Tulsa, but the WNBA itself as he announced he will move the team to Dallas. The following day, minority owner Stuart Price filed suit against Cameron in a failed attempt to keep the team in Tulsa.

On July 23, 2015, WNBA League owners unanimously approved Tulsa Shock's relocation to Dallas-Fort Worth. The last regular season home game for the Shock in Tulsa was September 13 against Phoenix. While the Shock did make the playoffs, they were still young and were swept in 2 straight by the same Phoenix squad. The new home arena for the Shock in DFW is the College Park Center at UT Arlington, also home to the UT Arlington Mavericks.

On November 2, 2015 the team name was officially changed to the Dallas Wings. The name stems from the famous Mobil Oil Co. "Flying Horse" atop of a historic downtown Dallas building. Also it is a similar mascot to its local NBA team the Dallas Mavericks.

=== Uniforms ===
- Detroit: White with the team's logo of the stylized Detroit Shock name, in black and blue, over a WNBA basketball at home. Blue with the word "Detroit" across the front for the road jersey.
- Tulsa: Gold with team logo of stylized Tulsa Shock, in black and gold at home. Black with the word "Tulsa", in gold, diagonally in the front for the road jersey.

In 2013, The Tulsa Shock and Osage Casino entered into a multi-year marquee partnership. The Osage Casino logo appeared on the Shock home and away jerseys.

== Season-by-season records ==
Season	Team	Conference		Regular season			Playoff Results	Head coach
Season	Team	Conference		W	L	PCT	Playoff Results	Head coach
Detroit Shock
1998	1998	East	4th	17	13	.567	Did not qualify	Nancy Lieberman
1999	1999	East	2nd	15	17	.469	Lost Conference Semifinals (Charlotte, 0–1)	Nancy Lieberman
2000	2000	East	5th	14	18	.438	Did not qualify	Nancy Lieberman
2001	2001	East	7th	10	22	.313	Did not qualify	Greg Williams
2002	2002	East	8th	9	23	.281	Did not qualify	G. Williams (0–10); B. Laimbeer (9–13)
2003	2003	East	1st	25	9	.735	Won Conference Semifinals (Cleveland, 2–1); Won Conference Finals (Connecticut, 2–0); Won WNBA Finals (Los Angeles, 2–1)	Bill Laimbeer
2004	2004	East	3rd	17	17	.500	Lost Conference Semifinals (New York, 1–2)	Bill Laimbeer
2005	2005	East	4th	16	18	.471	Lost Conference Semifinals (Connecticut, 0–2)	Bill Laimbeer
2006	2006	East	2nd	23	11	.676	Won Conference Semifinals (Indiana, 2–0); Won Conference Finals (Connecticut, 2–1); Won WNBA Finals (Sacramento, 3–2)	Bill Laimbeer
2007	2007	East	1st	24	10	.706	Won Conference Semifinals (New York, 2–1); Won Conference Finals (Indiana, 2–1); Lost WNBA Finals (Phoenix, 2–3)	Bill Laimbeer
2008	2008	East	1st	22	12	.647	Won Conference Semifinals (Indiana, 2–1); Won Conference Finals (New York, 2–1); Won WNBA Finals (San Antonio, 3–0)	Bill Laimbeer
2009	2009	East	3rd	18	16	.529	Won Conference Semifinals (Atlanta, 2–0); Lost Conference Finals (Indiana, 1–2)	B. Laimbeer (1–3); R. Mahorn (17–13)
Tulsa Shock
2010	2010	West	6th	6	28	.176	Did not qualify	Nolan Richardson
2011	2011	West	6th	3	31	.088	Did not qualify	N. Richardson (1–10); T. Edwards (2–21)
2012	2012	West	5th	9	25	.265	Did not qualify	Gary Kloppenburg
2013	2013	West	6th	11	23	.324	Did not qualify	Gary Kloppenburg
2014	2014	West	5th	12	22	.353	Did not qualify	Fred Williams
2015	2015	West	3rd	18	16	.529	Lost Conference Semifinals (Phoenix, 0–2)	Fred Williams
Regular season				269	331	.448	4 Conference Championships	
Playoffs				30	21	.588	3 WNBA Championships	

== Players ==
=== Final roster ===
2015 Tulsa Shock roster
Players
Coaches

Pos.	No.	Nat.	Name	Height	Weight	DOB	From	Yrs
F	24	(United States)	Baugh, Vicki	6' 4" (1.93m)	190 lb (86kg)	1989-05-21	Tennessee	1
G/F	13	(United States)	Christmas, Karima	6' 0" (1.83m)	180 lb (82kg)	1989-09-11	Duke	4
G	4	(United States)	Diggins, Skylar (injured)	5' 9" (1.75m)	145 lb (66kg)	1990-08-02	Notre Dame	2
F	35	(United States)	Hooper, Jordan	6' 2" (1.88m)	185 lb (84kg)	1992-02-20	Nebraska	1
G	12	(United States)	Hrynko, Brittany	5' 8" (1.73m)	152 lb (69kg)	1993-04-24	DePaul	R
F	33	(United States)	Jackson-Jones, Tiffany	6' 3" (1.91m)	185 lb (84kg)	1985-04-26	Texas	7
F	25	(United States)	Johnson, Glory	6' 3" (1.91m)	170 lb (77kg)	1990-07-27	Tennessee	3
G	1	(United States)	Kiesel, Brianna	5' 7" (1.7m)	125 lb (57kg)	1993-07-08	Pittsburgh	R
C	3	(United States)	Paris, Courtney	6' 4" (1.93m)	250 lb (113kg)	1987-09-21	Oklahoma	5
F/C	22	(United States)	Pierson, Plenette	6' 2" (1.88m)	178 lb (81kg)	1981-08-31	Texas Tech	12
F	55	(United States)	Plaisance, Theresa	6' 5" (1.96m)	200 lb (91kg)	1992-05-18	LSU	1
G	0	(United States)	Sims, Odyssey	5' 8" (1.73m)	160 lb (73kg)	1992-07-13	Baylor	1
G	2	(United States)	Williams, Riquna	5' 7" (1.7m)	165 lb (75kg)	1990-05-28	Miami (FL)	3
C	32	(Sweden)	Zahui B., Amanda	6' 5" (1.96m)	250 lb (113kg)	1993-09-08	Minnesota	R

Head coach
(United States) Fred Williams (Boise State)
Assistant coaches
(United States) Bridget Pettis (Florida)
(United States) Ed Baldwin (North Carolina Central)
Athletic trainer
(United States) Allison Russell (Tulsa)

Legend

- (C) Team captain
- (DP) Unsigned draft pick
- (FA) Free agent
- (S) Suspended
- Injured

WNBA roster page

=== Former players ===
- Jennifer Azzi (1999)
- Carla Boyd (1998–1999, 2001)
- Kara Braxton (2005–2010)
- Sandy Brondello (1998–1999), now the head coach of the Toronto Tempo
- Liz Cambage
- Dominique Canty (1999–2002)
- Swin Cash (2002–2007), now Vice President of Basketball Operations and Team Development of the New Orleans Pelicans.
- Barbara Farris (2000–2005, 2009)
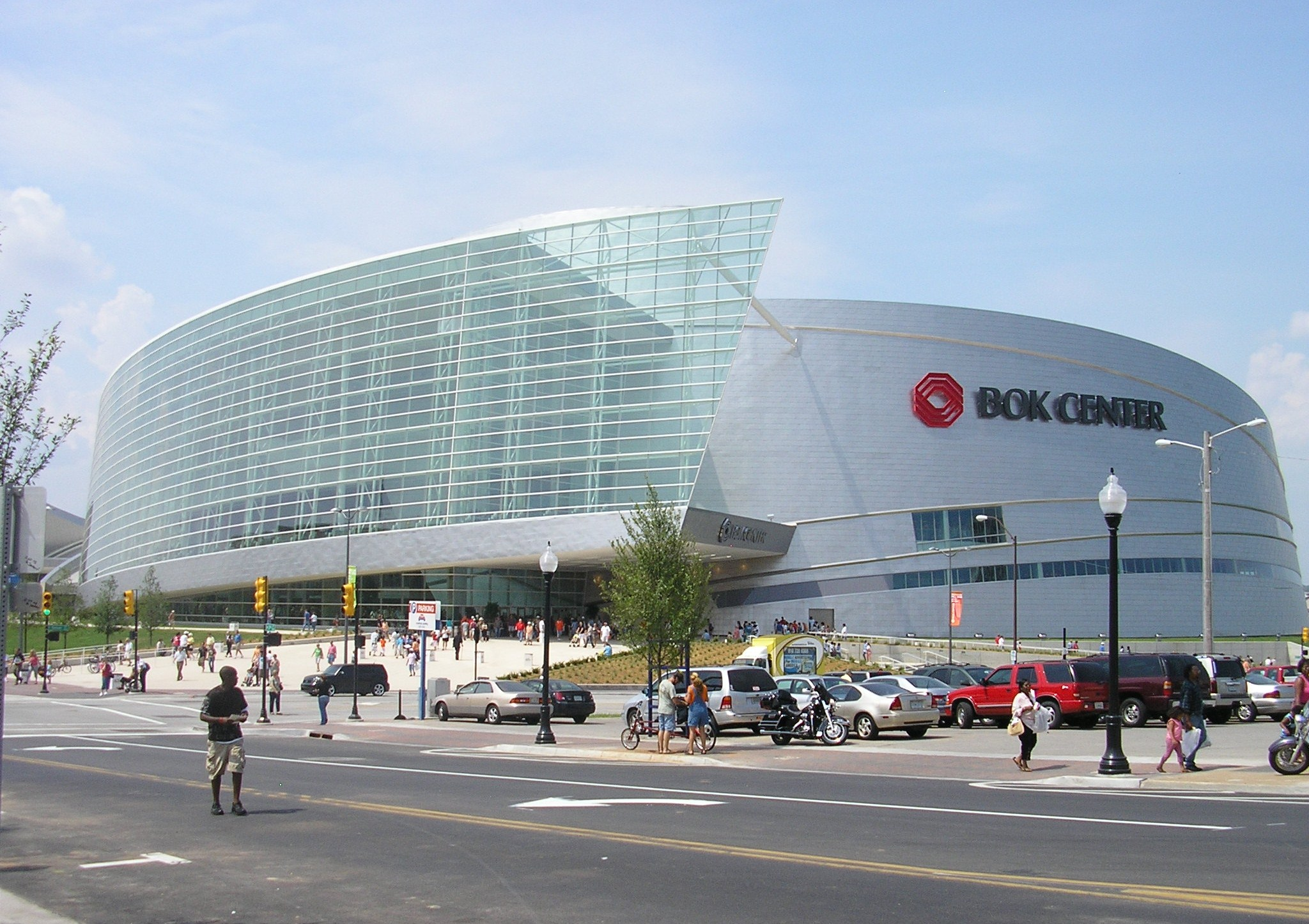
  The BOK Center, home of the Shock
- Cheryl Ford (2003–2008)
- Alexis Hornbuckle (2008–2010)
- Tasha Humphrey (2008)
- Shannon Johnson (2007)
- Temeka Johnson (2012)
- Marion Jones (2010–2011)
- Ivory Latta (2007, 2010-2012)
- Taj McWilliams-Franklin (2008–2009)
- Astou Ndiaye-Diatta (1999–2003)
- Deanna Nolan (2001–2009)
- Wendy Palmer (1999–2002)
- Kayla Pedersen (2011-2013)
- Elaine Powell (2002–2008)
- Nicole Powell (2013)
- Ruth Riley (2003–2006)
- Katie Smith (2005–2009), now the assistant coach of the Minnesota Lynx
- Sheryl Swoopes (2011)
- Shavonte Zellous (2009–2010), now a member of the Washington Mystics

== Coaches and staff ==
=== Owners ===
- William Davidson, owner of the Detroit Pistons (1998–2009)
- Tulsa Pro Hoops LLC, composed of Bill Cameron and David Box (majority owners), and Chris Christian, Pat Chernicky, Sam and Rita Combs, Pat and Don Hardin, Paula Marshall, Stuart and Linda Price, and Katie and Scott Schofield (2010–present)

=== Head coaches ===
Detroit Shock Coaches
Name	Start	End	Seasons	Regular season				Playoffs			
Name	Start	End	Seasons	W	L	PCT	G	W	L	PCT	G
Nancy Lieberman	January 12, 1998	August 28, 2000	3	46	48	.489	94	0	1	.000	1
Greg Williams	September 20, 2000	June 19, 2002	2	10	32	.238	42	0	0	.000	0
Bill Laimbeer	June 19, 2002	July 15, 2009	8	137	93	.596	230	27	16	.628	43
Rick Mahorn	July 15, 2009	end of 2009	1	17	13	.567	30	3	2	.600	5
Tulsa Shock Coaches
Nolan Richardson	September 29, 2009	July 8, 2011	2	7	38	.156	45	0	0	.000	0
Teresa Edwards	July 8, 2011	January 3, 2012	1	2	21	.087	23	0	0	.000	0
Gary Kloppenburg	January 3, 2012	October 15, 2013	2	20	48	.294	68	0	0	.000	0
Fred Williams	January 23, 2014	Current	2	30	38	.441	68	0	2	.000	2

=== General managers ===
- Nancy Lieberman (1998–2000)
- Greg Williams (2000–2002)
- Bill Laimbeer (2002–2009)
- Cheryl Reeve (2009)
- Nolan Richardson (2010–2011)
- Teresa Edwards (2011)
- Steve Swetoha & Gary Kloppenburg (2012–2013)
- Steve Swetoha (2013–2016)

=== Assistant coaches ===
- Steve Smith (1998–2001)
- Greg Williams (1998–2000)
- Tom Cross (2001–2002)
- Frank Schneider (2002)
- Laurie Byrd (2003–2005)
- Pam McGee (2003)
- Korie Hlede (2004)
- Rick Mahorn (2005–2009)
- Cheryl Reeve (2006–2009)
- Tammy Bagby (2010)
- Wayne Stehlik (2010–2011)
- Teresa Edwards (2011)
- Tracy Murray (2011)
- Kathy McConnell-Miller (2011–2012)
- Jason Glover (2012–2013)
- Stacey Lovelace-Tolbert (2013)
- Bridget Pettis (2014–present)
- Ed Baldwin (2014–present)

=== Hall of Famers ===
- Nancy Lieberman, enshrined 1996
- Lynette Woodard, enshrined 2004

== Statistics ==
Tulsa Shock statistics
1990s

Season	Individual			Team vs Opponents		
Season	PPG	RPG	APG	PPG	RPG	FG%
1998	S. Brondello (14.2)	C. Brown (10.0)	S. Brondello (3.3)	69.6 vs 69.3	35.9 vs 31.6	.411 vs .411
1999	S. Brondello (13.3)	V. Whiting-Raymond (6.7)	J. Azzi (3.8)	70.0 vs 72.0	31.1 vs 32.2	.401 vs .437

2000s

Season	Individual			Team vs Opponents		
Season	PPG	RPG	APG	PPG	RPG	FG%
2000	W. Palmer (13.8)	W. Palmer (6.8)	D. Canty (2.9)	72.8 vs 75.8	30.8 vs 30.3	.438 vs .460
2001	A. Ndiaye-Diatta (11.8)	W. Palmer (7.0)	E. Brown (2.7)	65.7 vs 70.9	29.5 vs 30.7	.404 vs .462
2002	S. Cash (14.8)	S. Cash (6.9)	D. Canty (3.0)	66.1 vs 70.8	33.7 vs 30.7	.399 vs .417
2003	S. Cash (16.6)	C. Ford (10.4)	E. Powell (3.9)	75.1 vs 70.4	36.2 vs 31.3	.450 vs .399
2004	S. Cash (16.4)	C. Ford (9.6)	E. Powell (4.5)	69.6 vs 70.0	34.4 vs 31.0	.417 vs .410
2005	D. Nolan (15.9)	C. Ford (9.8)	D. Nolan (3.7)	66.1 vs 67.3	35.7 vs 29.9	.403 vs .403
2006	C. Ford (13.8)	C. Ford (11.3)	D. Nolan (3.6)	74.3 vs 70.1	37.8 vs 31.9	.414 vs .388
2007	D. Nolan (16.3)	S. Cash (6.1)	D. Nolan (3.9)	79.3 vs 74.7	38.6 vs 32.0	.430 vs .396
2008	D. Nolan (15.8)	C. Ford (8.7)	D. Nolan (4.4)	78.6 vs 74.2	36.7 vs 31.9	.424 vs .405
2009	D. Nolan (16.9)	C. Ford (7.4)	D. Nolan (3.5)	78.0 vs 77.8	36.1 vs 32.4	.430 vs .410

2010s

Season	Individual			Team vs Opponents		
Season	PPG	RPG	APG	PPG	RPG	FG%
2010	I. Latta (12.4)	C. Black (6.5)	I. Latta (3.9)	78.0 vs 89.8	31.6 vs 37.5	.424 vs .470
2011	T. Jackson (12.4)	T. Jackson (8.4)	I. Latta (3.2)	69.2 vs 82.1	30.7 vs 32.6	.396 vs .484
2012	I. Latta (14.3)	G. Johnson (6.8)	T. Johnson (4.7)	77.2 vs 84.2	29.5 vs 37.1	.405 vs .477
2013	L. Cambage (16.3)	G. Johnson (8.9)	S. Diggins (3.8)	77.0 vs 79.2	32.8 vs 35.7	.405 vs .451
2014	S. Diggins (20.1)	C. Paris (10.2)	S. Diggins (5.0)	81.3 vs 83.3	34.6 vs 33.8	.428 vs .468
2015	S. Diggins (17.8)	C. Paris (9.3)	S. Diggins (5.0)	77.7 vs 77.1	35.6 vs 33.6	.395 vs .445

== Media coverage ==
Some Shock games were broadcast on The Cox Channel (COX), which is a local television station for certain areas of the state of Oklahoma. More often than not, NBA TV picked up the feed from the local broadcast, which was shown nationally. The broadcasters for the Shock games were Mike Wolfe and Shanna Crossley.

== All-time notes ==
=== Regular season attendance ===
- A sellout for a basketball game at The Palace of Auburn Hills (Detroit) is 22,076.
- A sellout for a basketball game at BOK Center (Tulsa) is 17,839.

Regular season all-time attendance
Detroit Shock
Year	Average	High	Low	Sellouts	Total for year	WNBA game average
1998	10,229 (6th)	16,246	7,102	0	153,434	10,869
1999	8,485 (9th)	12,378	6,771	0	135,753	10,207
2000	6,716 (13th)	10,147	4,480	0	107,449	9,074
2001	6,834 (14th)	13,378	4,013	0	109,348	9,105
2002	5,886 (16th)	10,893	3,315	0	94,171	9,228
2003	7,862 (9th)	12,414	3,532	0	133,647	8,826
2004	9,462 (4th)	14,435	6,542	0	160,860	8,589
2005	9,374 (3rd)	14,932	5,635	0	159,356	8,172
2006	9,643 (1st)	12,985	6,932	0	163,924	7,476
2007	9,749 (1st)	14,109	7,421	0	165,738	7,819
2008	9,569 (1st)	15,210	6,842	0	162,669	7,948
2009	8,011 (5th)	14,439	5,239	0	136,184	8,029
Tulsa Shock
Year	Average	High	Low	Sellouts	Total for year	WNBA game average
2010	4,812 (11th)	7,806	3,333	0	81,811	7,834
2011	4,828 (12th)	7,509	3,435	0	82,069	7,954
2012	5,203 (12th)	7,509	4,102	0	88,453	7,452
2013	5,474 (12th)	7,381	4,107	0	93,055	7,531
2014	5,566 (12th)	7,256	4,107	0	94,626	7,578
2015	5,168 (11th)	7,256	4,145	0	87,854	7,184

=== Draft picks ===
- 1998 Expansion Draft: Rhonda Blades (1), Tajama Abraham (3), Tara Williams (5), Lynette Woodard (7)
- 1998: Korie Hlede (4), Rachael Sporn (14), Gergana Branzova (24), Sandy Brondello (34)
- 1999: Jennifer Azzi (5), Val Whiting (17), Dominique Canty (29), Astou Ndiaye-Diatta (41)
- 2000: Edwina Brown (3), Tamicha Jackson (8), Chevonne Hammond (44), Cal Bouchard (60)
- 2001: Deanna Nolan (6), Jae Kingi (22), Svetlana Volnaya (38), Kelly Santos (54)
- 2002: Swin Cash (2), Lanae Williams (18), Ayana Walker (20), Jill Chapman (21), Kathy Wambe (22), Ericka Haney (47)
- 2003 Miami/Portland Dispersal Draft: Ruth Riley (1)
- 2003: Cheryl Ford (3), Kara Lawson (5), Syreeta Bromfield (28)
- 2004 Cleveland Dispersal Draft: Jennifer Rizzotti (13)
- 2004: Iciss Tillis (11), Shereka Wright (13), Erika Valek (23), Jennifer Smith (32)
- 2005: Kara Braxton (7), Dionnah Jackson (13), Nikita Bell (20), Jenni Lingor (33)
- 2006: Ambrosia Anderson (17), Zane Teillane (35)
- 2007 Charlotte Dispersal Draft: selection waived
- 2007: Ivory Latta (11)
- 2008: Alexis Hornbuckle (4), Tasha Humphrey (11), Olayinka Sanni (18), Natasha Lacy (28), Valeriya Berezhynska (42)
- 2009 Houston Dispersal Draft: selection waived
- 2009: Shavonte Zellous (11), Brittany Miller (18), Tanae Davis-Cain (37)
- 2010 Sacramento Dispersal Draft: Scholanda Robinson (7)
- 2010: Amanda Thompson (19), Vivian Frieson (31)
- 2011: Liz Cambage (2), Kayla Pedersen (7), Italee Lucas (21), Chastity Reed (25)
- 2012: Glory Johnson (4), Riquna Williams (17), Vicki Baugh (25), Lynetta Kizer (29)
- 2013: Skylar Diggins (3), Angel Goodrich (29)
- 2014: Odyssey Sims (2), Jordan Hooper (13), Theresa Plaisance (27)
- 2015: Amanda Zahui B. (2), Brianna Kiesel (13), Mimi Mungedi (25)

=== Trades ===
- July 29, 1999: The Shock traded Korie Hlede and Cindy Brown to the Utah Starzz in exchange for Wendy Palmer and Olympia Scott-Richardson.
- April 24, 2000: The Shock traded Jennifer Azzi and the 12th pick in the 2000 Draft to the Utah Starzz in exchange for the third and eighth picks in the 2000 Draft.
- April 20, 2001: The Shock traded Val Whiting to the Minnesota Lynx in exchange for a second-round pick in the 2002 Draft.
- April 24, 2001: The Shock traded Anna DeForge to the Houston Comets in exchange for Jennifer Rizzotti.
- May 13, 2001: The Shock traded Tamicha Jackson to the Portland Fire in exchange for a second-round pick in the 2002 Draft.
- May 27, 2001: The Shock traded Jennifer Rizzotti to the Cleveland Rockers in exchange for a third-round pick in the 2002 Draft.
- May 27, 2001: The Shock traded Olympia Scott-Richardson and a third-round pick in the 2002 Draft to the Indiana Fever in exchange for a second-round pick in the 2002 Draft.
- May 3, 2002: The Shock traded Claudia das Neves to the Phoenix Mercury in exchange for a fourth-round pick in the 2003 Draft.
- May 11, 2002: The Shock traded a fourth-round pick in the 2003 Draft to the Sacramento Monarchs in exchange for Stacy Clinesmith.
- July 7, 2002: The Shock traded Wendy Palmer and a second-round pick in the 2003 Draft to the Orland Miracle in exchange for Elaine Powell and a first-round pick in the 2003 Draft.
- April 27, 2003: The Shock traded Dominique Canty to the Houston Comets in exchange for Allison Curtin.
- April 28, 2003: The Shock traded Edwina Brown and Lanae Williams to the Phoenix Mercury in exchange for Telisha Quarles and Petra Ujhelyi.
- April 29, 2003: The Shock traded Kara Lawson to the Sacramento Monarchs in exchange for Kendra Holland-Corn.
- May 19, 2003: The Shock traded a third-round pick in the 2004 Draft to the Minnesota Lynx in exchange for Tamara Moore.
- July 31, 2003: The Shock traded Tamara Moore to the Phoenix Mercury in exchange for Stacey Thomas.
- February 11, 2004: The Shock traded Kendra-Holland Corn and the 26th pick in the 2004 Draft to the Houston Comets in exchange for the 11th and the 32nd picks in the 2004 Draft.
- April 17, 2004: The Shock traded Shereka Wright, Sheila Lambert and Erika Valek to the Phoenix Mercury in exchange for Chandi Jones.
- April 14, 2005: The Shock traded Iciss Tillis to the Washington Mystics in exchange for the 13th pick in the 2005 Draft.
- June 29, 2005: The Shock traded Andrea Stinson and a second-round pick in the 2006 Draft to the Phoenix Mercury in exchange for Plenette Pierson.
- July 30, 2005: The Shock traded Chandi Jones, Stacey Thomas, and a first-round pick in the 2006 Draft to the Minnesota Lynx in exchange for Katie Smith and a second-round pick in the 2006 Draft.
- April 5, 2006: The Shock traded Ambrosia Anderson and a second-round pick in the 2007 Draft to the Minnesota Lynx in exchange for Jacqueline Batteast and a third-round pick in the 2007 Draft.
- May 18, 2006: The Shock traded two third-round picks in the 2007 Draft to the Phoenix Mercury in exchange for Angelina Williams.
- February 22, 2007: The Shock traded Ruth Riley to the San Antonio Silver Stars in exchange for Katie Feenstra and the right to swap first-round picks in the 2008 Draft.
- February 6, 2008: The Shock traded Ivory Latta to the Atlanta Dream in exchange for LaToya Thomas and the 18th pick in the 2008 Draft.
- February 19, 2008: The Shock traded Swin Cash to the Seattle Storm in exchange for the fourth pick in the 2008 Draft.
- June 22, 2008: The Shock traded LaToya Thomas to the Minnesota Lynx in exchange for Eshaya Murphy.
- August 12, 2008: The Shock traded Eshaya Murphy, Tasha Humphrey, and a second-round pick in the 2009 Draft to the Washington Mystics in exchange for Taj McWilliams-Franklin.
- April 9, 2009: The Shock traded Ashley Shields to the Atlanta Dream in exchange for the 18th pick in the 2009 Draft.
- April 7, 2010: The Shock traded the seventh pick in the 2010 Draft and a second-round pick in the 2011 Draft to the Connecticut Sun in exchange for Chante Black and Amber Holt.
- April 14, 2010: The Shock traded Crystal Kelly to the San Antonio Silver Stars in exchange for Shanna Crossley.
- May 27, 2010: The Shock traded Shavonte Zellous to the Indiana Fever in exchange for a second-round pick in the 2011 Draft.
- June 14, 2010: The Shock traded Plenette Pierson to the New York Liberty in exchange for Tiffany Jackson.
- July 22, 2010: The Shock traded Kara Braxton to the Phoenix Mercury in exchange for Nicole Ohlde and a first-round pick in the 2011 Draft.
- July 26, 2010: The Shock traded Alexis Hornbuckle to the Minnesota Lynx in exchange for Rashanda McCants.
- February 1, 2011: The Shock traded a second-round pick in the 2012 Draft to the Los Angeles Sparks in exchange for Andrea Riley.
- May 2, 2011: The Shock traded Scholanda Robinson to the San Antonio Silver Stars in exchange for second- and third-round picks in the 2012 Draft.
- January 12, 2012: The Shock traded Andrea Riley to the Phoenix Mercury in exchange for Temeka Johnson.
- July 2, 2012: The Shock traded Karima Christmas to the Indiana Fever in exchange for Roneeka Hodges.
- March 1, 2013: The Shock traded Deanna Nolan, a second-round pick, and a third-round pick in the 2013 Draft to the New York Liberty in exchange for Nicole Powell. As part of the three-team trade, the Shock also traded their second-round pick in the 2014 Draft to the Minnesota Lynx in exchange for Candice Wiggins.
- June 20, 2013: The Shock traded Kayla Pedersen to the Connecticut Sun in exchange for a second-round pick in the 2014 Draft.

=== All-Stars ===
- 1999: Sandy Brondello
- 2000: Wendy Palmer
- 2001: None
- 2002: None
- 2003: Swin Cash, Cheryl Ford, Deanna Nolan
- 2004: Cheryl Ford, Deanna Nolan
- 2005: Swin Cash, Cheryl Ford, Deanna Nolan, Ruth Riley
- 2006: Cheryl Ford, Deanna Nolan, Katie Smith
- 2007: Kara Braxton, Cheryl Ford, Deanna Nolan
- 2008: No All-Star Game
- 2009: Katie Smith
- 2010: None
- 2011: Liz Cambage
- 2012: No All-Star Game
- 2013: Glory Johnson
- 2014: Skylar Diggins, Glory Johnson
- 2015: Skylar Diggins, Plenette Pierson, Riquna Williams
- 2016: No All-Star Game

=== Olympians ===
- 2004: Swin Cash, Ruth Riley
- 2008: Katie Smith
- 2012: Liz Cambage (AUS)

=== Honors and awards ===
- 1998 All-WNBA Second Team: Cindy Brown
- 2003 Finals MVP: Ruth Riley
- 2003 Rookie of the Year: Cheryl Ford
- 2003 Coach of the Year: Bill Laimbeer
- 2003 All-WNBA Second Team: Swin Cash
- 2003 All-WNBA Second Team: Cheryl Ford
- 2003 All-WNBA Second Team: Deanna Nolan
- 2004 All-WNBA Second Team: Swin Cash
- 2005 All-Defensive Second Team: Deanna Nolan
- 2006 Finals MVP: Deanna Nolan
- 2006 All-WNBA Second Team: Deanna Nolan
- 2006 All-Defensive Second Team: Cheryl Ford
- 2006 All-Defensive Second Team: Deanna Nolan
- 2007 All-Star Game MVP: Cheryl Ford
- 2007 Sixth Woman of the Year: Plenette Pierson
- 2007 All-Defensive First Team: Deanna Nolan
- 2008 Finals MVP: Katie Smith
- 2008 All-WNBA Second Team: Deanna Nolan
- 2008 All-Defensive Second Team: Deanna Nolan
- 2008 All-Defensive Second Team: Katie Smith
- 2009 All-WNBA Second Team: Deanna Nolan
- 2009 All-Defensive Second Team: Deanna Nolan
- 2009 All-Rookie Team: Shavonte Zellous
- 2011 All-Rookie Team: Liz Cambage
- 2012 All-Rookie Team: Glory Johnson
- 2012 All-Rookie Team: Riquna Williams
- 2013 Sixth Woman of the Year: Riquna Williams
- 2013 All-Defensive Second Team: Glory Johnson
- 2013 All-Rookie Team: Skylar Diggins
- 2014 Most Improved Player: Skylar Diggins
- 2014 Peak Performer (Rebounds): Courtney Paris
- 2014 All-WNBA First Team: Skylar Diggins
- 2014 All-Rookie Team: Odyssey Sims
- 2015 Peak Performer (Rebounds): Courtney Paris

Sporting positions
Preceded by Los Angeles Sparks	WNBA Champions; 2003 (First title)	Succeeded by Seattle Storm
Preceded by New York Liberty	WNBA Eastern Conference Champions; 2003 (First title)	Succeeded by Connecticut Sun
Preceded by Sacramento Monarchs	WNBA Champions; 2006 (Second title)	Succeeded by Phoenix Mercury
Preceded by Phoenix Mercury	WNBA Champions; 2008 (Third title)	Succeeded by Phoenix Mercury
Preceded by Connecticut Sun	WNBA Eastern Conference Champions; 2006 (Second title); 2007 (Third title); 2008 (Fourth title)	Succeeded by Indiana Fever
