= Maddy Siegrist =

American basketball player (born 2000)

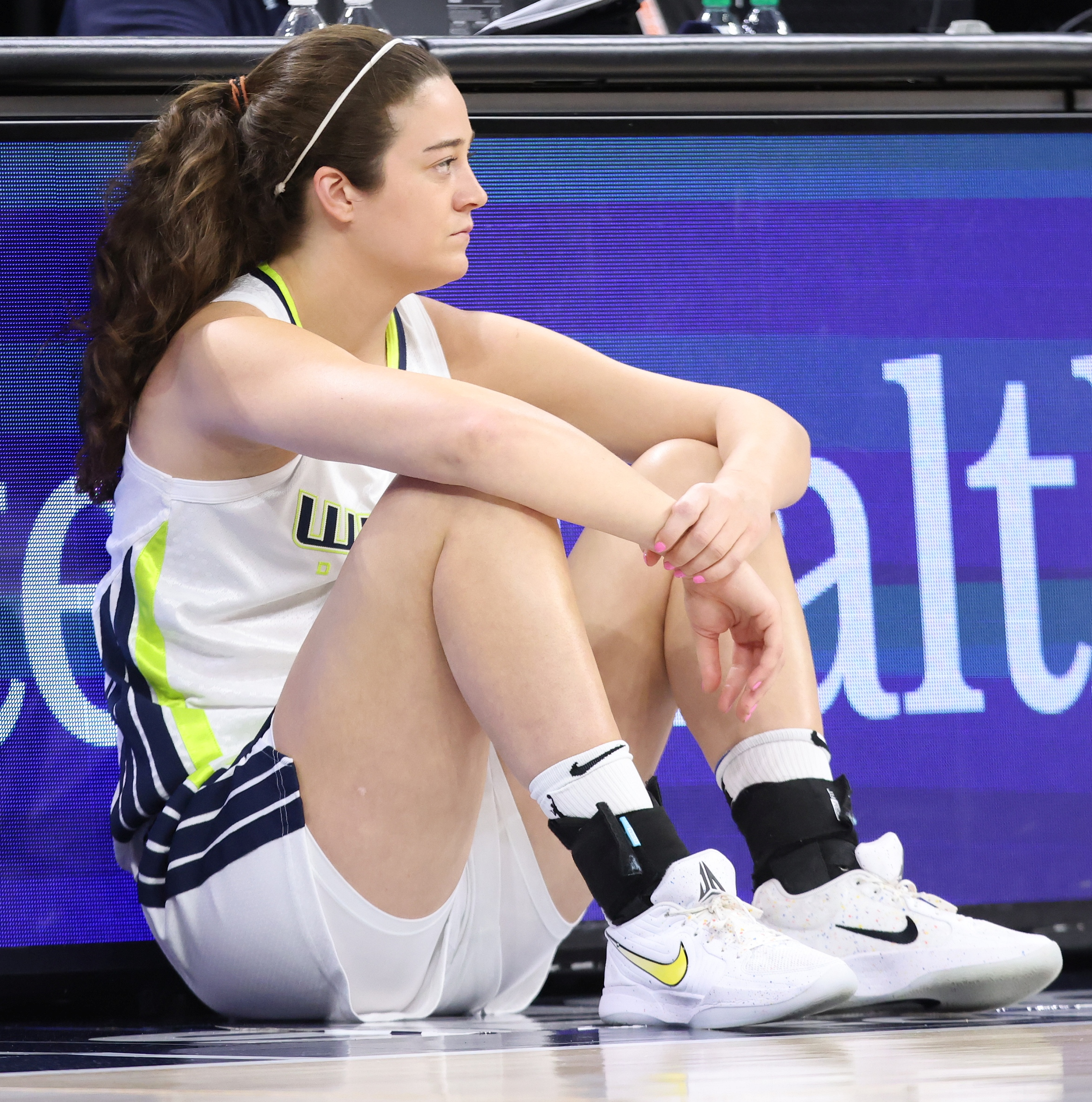
- Siegrist with the Dallas Wings in 2025

No. 20 – Dallas Wings
- Position: Forward
- League: WNBA

Personal information
- Born: May 22, 2000 (age 26) Poughkeepsie, New York, U.S.
- Listed height: 6 ft 2 in (1.88 m)
- Listed weight: 175 lb (79 kg)

Career information
- High school: Our Lady of Lourdes (Poughkeepsie, New York)
- College: Villanova (2018–2023)
- WNBA draft: 2023: 1st round, 3rd overall pick
- Drafted by: Dallas Wings
- Playing career: 2023–present

Career history
- 2023–present: Dallas Wings
- 2026–present: Laces BC

Career highlights
- Katrina McClain Award (2023); WBCA Coaches' All-American (2023); Athletes Unlimited Champion (2025); First-team All-American – AP, USBWA (2023); Third-team All-American – AP, USBWA (2022); 2× Big East Player of the Year (2022, 2023); 4× First-team All-Big East (2020–2023); Big East Freshman of the Year (2020); Big East All-Freshman Team (2020); NCAA season scoring leader (2023)
- Stats at Basketball Reference
Medals
Women's 3x3 basketball
Representing the United States
FIBA 3x3 AmeriCup
Silver medal – second place	2024 San Juan	Team

Madison Siegrist (born May 22, 2000) is an American professional basketball player for the Dallas Wings of the Women's National Basketball Association (WNBA) and for the Laces of Unrivaled. She played college basketball for the Villanova Wildcats of the Big East Conference and is the Big East's all-time leading scorer in women's basketball. She was selected 3rd overall in the 2023 WNBA draft by the Wings.

== Early life ==
Siegrist played basketball for Our Lady of Lourdes High School in Poughkeepsie, New York. As a junior, she was named Poughkeepsie Journal Player of the Year after averaging 21 points, 12 rebounds and four assists per game and leading her team to the Section 1 Class AA semifinals. In her senior season, Siegrist averaged 32.7 points and 13.1 rebounds per game and repeated as Poughkeepsie Journal Player of the Year. She committed to playing college basketball for Villanova.

== College career ==
Siegrist redshirted her first season at Villanova after suffering a broken ankle. On December 21, 2019, she posted 41 points and 10 rebounds in a 77–69 win over La Salle, breaking the program freshman single-game scoring record. As a freshman, she averaged 18.8 points and 8.9 rebounds per game, earning first-team All-Big East and Freshman of the Year honors. Siegrist scored 583 points in the season, the most ever by a Villanova freshman. On December 19, 2020, she had a sophomore season-high 34 points and 19 rebounds in a 73–68 victory over Creighton. Siegrist averaged 22.8 points and 9.8 rebounds per game as a sophomore, and was a unanimous first-team All-Big East selection.

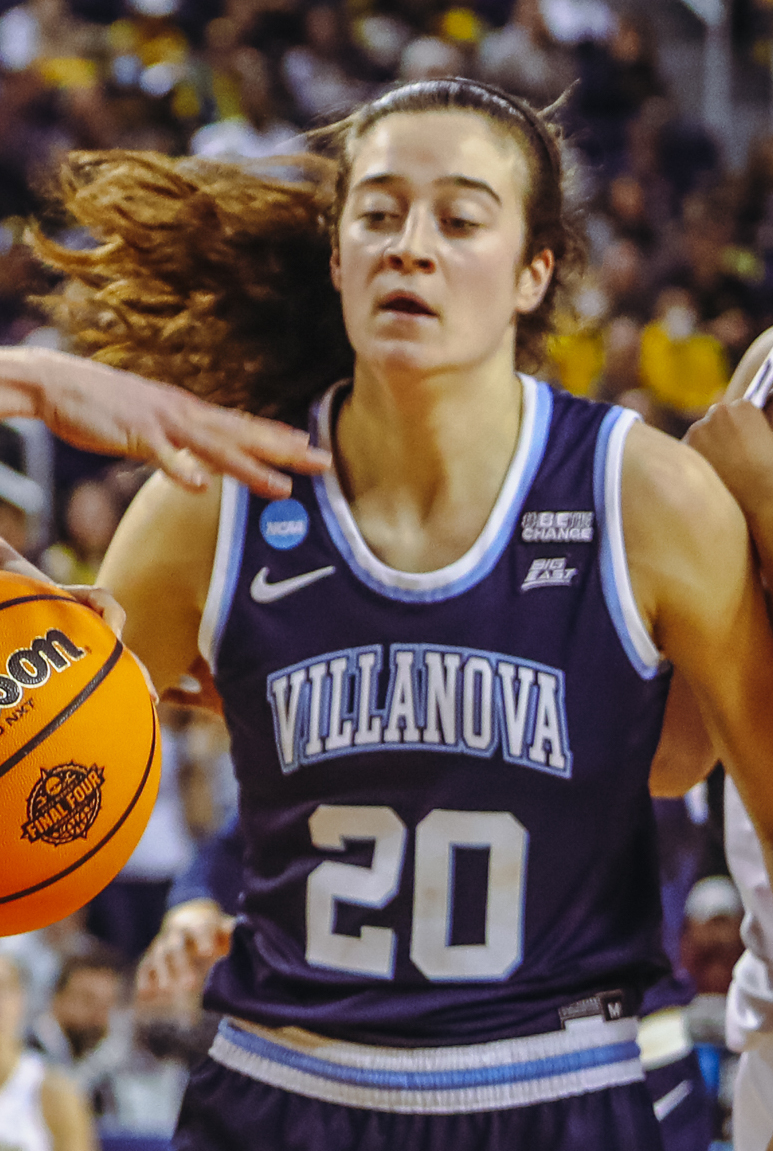
Siegrist with Villanova in 2022

On February 11, 2022, she scored a junior season-high 42 points, one short of the Big East record, and grabbed 13 rebounds in a 74–63 overtime win against Marquette. As a junior, Siegrist averaged 25.3 points and 9.2 rebounds per game, leading the Big East and ranking second in the NCAA Division I in scoring. She was named Big East Player of the Year and earned unanimous first-team All-Big East honors. Siegrist was a third-team All-American selection by the Associated Press and the United States Basketball Writers Association.

On January 20, 2023, she surpassed Shelly Pennefather for Villanova's career scoring record while scoring 23 points in a 73–57 win over Creighton. On February 11, Siegrist posted a career-high 50 points and 10 rebounds in a 99–65 win over Seton Hall. She broke the Big East and Villanova single-game scoring records and became the Big East's all-time leading scorer. As a senior, she was the nation's leading scorer, averaging 29.0 points and 9.1 rebounds per game. She recorded 13 games of at least 30 points, and scored no less than 21 points in a game this year. She became the Big East's all-time leading scorer, men's or women's, with 1,693 points. Following an outstanding season, she was named Big East Player of the Year and earned unanimous first-team All-Big East honors.

== Professional career ==
=== WNBA ===
==== Dallas Wings (2023–present) ====
Siegrist was selected 3rd overall in the 2023 WNBA draft by the Dallas Wings. In her rookie season, Siegrist had a limited role, appearing in 39 games off the bench and averaging 3.7 points in 8.2 minutes per game.

In her second season, Siegrist's role increased significantly. She made her debut as a starter in the second game of the season on May 18, in a 74–83 loss to the Chicago Sky, after Natasha Howard was sidelined by an injury. Siegrist started 11 of the 13 first games, averaging 14.6 points and 4.2 rebounds per game. However, she suffered a broken finger on June 17, in a 78–90 loss to the Minnesota Lynx, which sidelined her until the end of the Olympic break in August. With the Wings back at full strength and Siegrist not fully recovered, her playing time decreased, and she only started two games after Dallas had been eliminated from playoff contention. Overall, she played in 27 games, starting 13, and averaged 9.4 points and 3.3 rebounds in 23.9 minutes per game.

On May 6, 2025, the Wings exercised the fourth-year rookie contract option on Siegrist. However, her season was briefly derailed when the team announced on June 16 that she had been diagnosed with a tibial plateau fracture in her right knee, an injury suffered during a 93–90 loss to the Phoenix Mercury on June 11. Before the injury, Siegrist had averaged 9.4 points and 5.2 rebounds over 11 games, recording her only double-double of the season with 15 points and 11 rebound in an 81–65 loss to the Minnesota Lynx on June 8. Although surgery was not required, Siegrist missed more than a month and 18 games before returning on August 5 against the New York Liberty, where she scored 13 points on 6-of-9 shooting in an 85–76 loss. Following her return, Siegrist tied her career-high with 22 points in an 81–80 win over the Indiana Fever on August 12, then set a new career-high with 23 points in an 106–87 loss to the Las Vegas Aces on August 17. She matched that mark again on August 29 in a 100–78 loss to the Atlanta Dream. Siegrist finished the season averaging career-bests of 12.7 points and 4.3 rebounds per game in 26 appearances, 15 of them as a starter. Her performance throughout the season helped establish her, alongside Paige Bueckers, as one of the Wings' cornerstone players for the future.

=== Athletes Unlimited ===
Siegrist played in the 2024 season of Athletes Unlimited Pro Basketball and finished 12th with 4,061 leaderboard points, averaging 19.6 points and 8.5 rebounds in 33.5 minutes per game.

Siegrist joined Athletes Unlimited for the 2025 season and won the championship by setting a new record with 7,052 leaderboard points, averaging 24 points per game on 54% shooting along with 8.8 rebounds per game.

=== Unrivaled ===
On November 5th, 2025, it was announced that Siegrist had been drafted by Laces BC for the 2026 Unrivaled season.

== Career statistics ==
Legend
GP	Games played	GS	Games started	MPG	Minutes per game	FG%	Field goal percentage
3P%	3-point field goal percentage	FT%	Free throw percentage	RPG	Rebounds per game	APG	Assists per game
SPG	Steals per game	BPG	Blocks per game	TO	Turnovers per game	PPG	Points per game
**Bold**	Career high	*	Led Division I	°	Led the league	‡	WNBA record

=== WNBA ===
==== Regular season ====
Stats current through end of 2025 season

WNBA regular season statistics
Year	Team	GP	GS	MPG	FG%	3P%	FT%	RPG	APG	SPG	BPG	TO	PPG
2023	Dallas	**39**	0	8.2	**.509**	**.333**	**.931**	1.6	0.2	0.2	0.2	**0.2**	3.7
2024	Dallas	27	13	23.9	.505	.270	.767	3.3	**1.0**	0.4	0.4	0.6	9.4
2025	Dallas	26	**15**	**27.0**	.491	.321	.690	**4.3**	0.8	**0.7**	**0.6**	0.5	**12.7**
**Career**	3 years, 1 team	92	28	18.1	.499	.308	.769	2.8	0.6	0.4	0.3	0.4	7.9

==== Playoffs ====
WNBA playoff statistics
Year	Team	GP	GS	MPG	FG%	3P%	FT%	RPG	APG	SPG	BPG	TO	PPG
2023	Dallas	4	0	4.8	.667	1.000	1.000	1.0	0.0	0.3	0.0	0.0	3.5
**Career**	1 year, 1 team	4	0	4.8	.667	1.000	1.000	1.0	0.0	0.3	0.0	0.0	3.5

=== College ===
NCAA statistics
Year	Team	GP	GS	MPG	FG%	3P%	FT%	RPG	APG	SPG	BPG	TO	PPG
2019–20	Villanova	31	28	35.1	44.7	32.5	76.1	8.9	1.3	0.9	1.1	1.8	18.8
2020–21	Villanova	24	24	34.5	48.3	**36.4**	77.4	**9.8**	**2.0**	**1.5**	1.1	2.6	22.8
2021–22	Villanova	27	27	**36.1**	49.3	34.6	82.1	9.2	1.9	1.4	1.0	1.8	25.3
2022–23	Villanova	**37**	**37**	35.4	**51.0**	36.1	**85.8**	9.2	1.5	1.2	**1.2**	**1.4**	**29.2***
**Career**		119	116	35.3	48.7	34.7	81.9	9.3	1.6	1.2	1.1	1.8	24.3

== Coaching career ==
Siegrist signed with Athletes Untapped as a private basketball coach on Jun 6, 2022.

== Personal life ==
Siegrist's father, George, played college basketball for Marist before joining the team as an assistant coach. At Villanova University, she received a bachelor's degree in communications and is pursuing a master's degree in education.

In October 2024, Siegrist got engaged to Stephen Perretta, a college basketball coach and the son of her former Villanova coach, Harry Perretta. The two married on October 31, 2025.

== See also ==
- List of NCAA Division I women's basketball season scoring leaders
