= Big East Conference Women's Basketball Player of the Year =

- Awarded for: the most outstanding female basketball player in the Big East Conference
- Country: United States
- First award: 1983
- Currently held by: Sarah Strong, UConn

The Big East Conference Women's Basketball Player of the Year award is given to the women's basketball player in the Big East Conference voted as the top performer by the conference coaches. It was first awarded at the end of the 1982–83 season, the first in which the Big East sponsored women's basketball. The current Big East claims the history of the original Big East Conference, which split along football lines in 2013, with three members leaving to join the Atlantic Coast Conference, the seven members that did not field teams in NCAA Division I FBS leaving to form a new Big East Conference, and the remaining FBS schools continuing to operate under the original Big East charter with the new name of American Athletic Conference (The American).

The head coaches of the league's teams submit their votes following the end of the regular season and before the conference's tournament in early March. The coaches cannot vote for their own players.

The first award went to Debbie Beckford of St. John's in 1983. There have been eight multiple winners so far. Rebecca Lobo and Diana Taurasi, both of UConn; Notre Dame's Skylar Diggins; and Villanova's Maddy Siegrist each won the award twice in their careers. Shelly Pennefather of Villanova and Kerry Bascom, Maya Moore, and Paige Bueckers of UConn were all three-time winners. Pennefather and Bascom won all of their awards consecutively, while Moore and Bueckers did not.

So far, voting has resulted in a tie once, in 1984 when both Jennifer Bruce and Kathy Finn won the award.

Eight players have also won National Player of the Year awards. Rebecca Lobo, Ruth Riley, Sue Bird, Diana Taurasi, Maya Moore, and Paige Bueckers are all recipients of the Naismith College Player of the Year award. Shelly Pennefather, Lobo, Jennifer Rizzotti, Bird, Taurasi, Moore, and Bueckers are all recipients of the Wade Trophy. Moore and Bueckers are also recipients of the John R. Wooden Award.

UConn, a founding member of the original Big East that moved to The American with the conference split and joined the current Big East in 2020, has the most all-time awards, with 21, and the most individual winners, with 13. Apart from UConn, the only current Big East members with more than one winner are Villanova, with three players who combined to win six awards; DePaul, with three players who each won one award; and Creighton and Marquette, each with two players who claimed one award. Three current Big East members have yet to have a winner—Seton Hall, which was a charter member of the Big East in 1979, and Butler and Xavier, both of which joined the Big East at its 2013 relaunch.

== Key ==
†	Co-Players of the Year
*	Awarded a national player of the year award that same season: the Naismith College Player of the Year, Wade Trophy or the John R. Wooden Award
Player (X)	Denotes the number of times the player has been awarded the Big East Player of the Year award at that point

== Winners ==
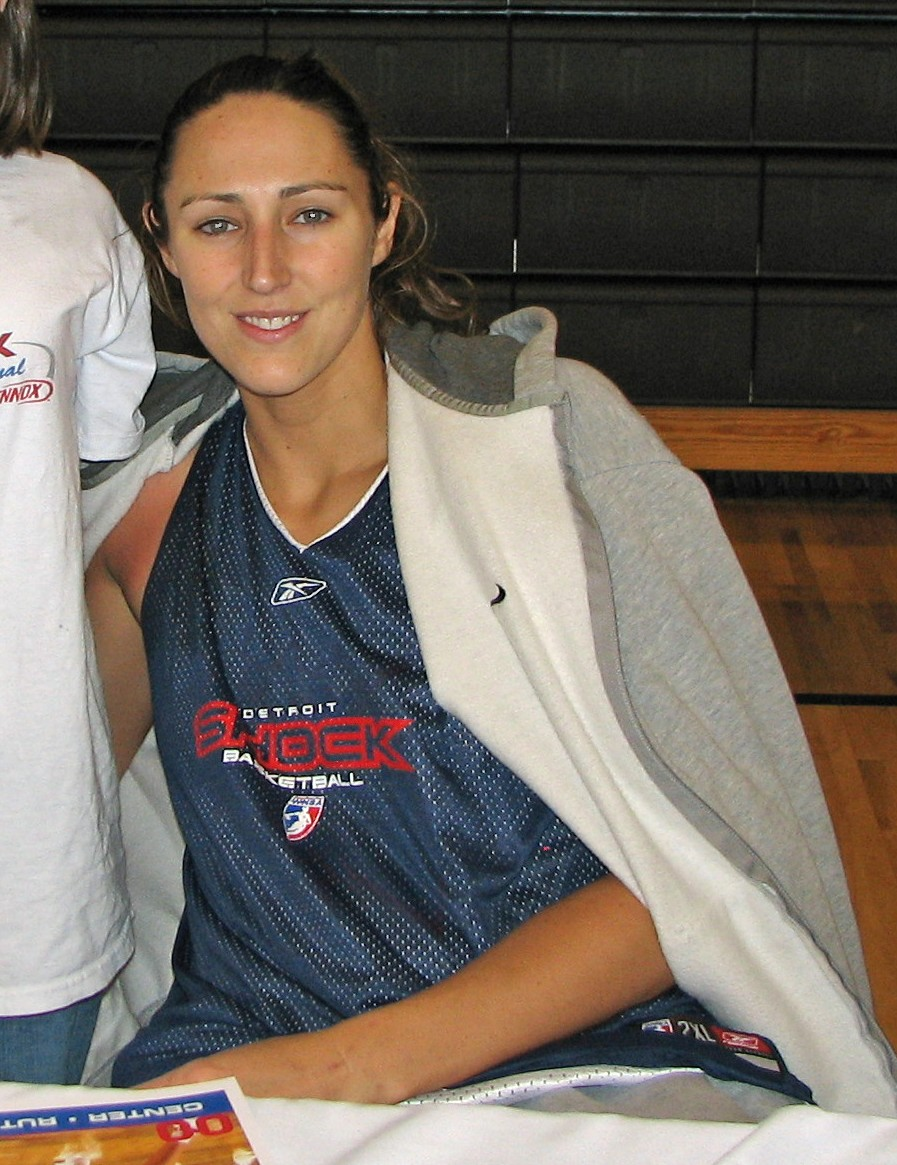
Ruth Riley is the first POY winner from Notre Dame.

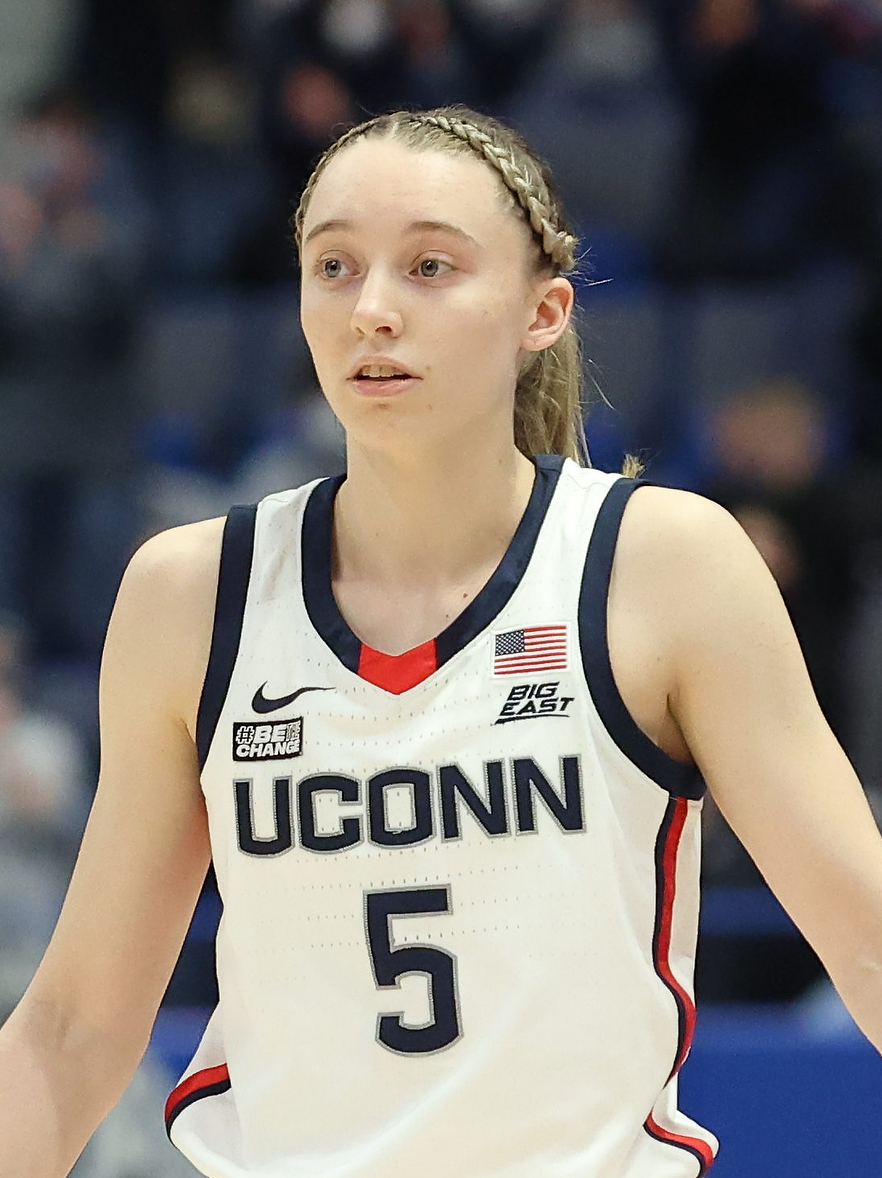
Paige Bueckers is the most recent freshman to be named POY, and is also the most recent three-time POY.

Season	Player	School	Class	Reference
1982–83	Debbie Beckford	St. John's	Senior	
1983–84^{†}	Jennifer Bruce	Pittsburgh	Sophomore	
1983–84^{†}	Kathy Finn	Providence	Sophomore	
1984–85	Shelly Pennefather	Villanova	Sophomore	
1985–86	Shelly Pennefather (2)	Villanova	Junior	
1986–87	Shelly Pennefather* (3)	Villanova	Senior	
1987–88	Lisa Angelotti	Villanova	Senior	
1988–89	Kerry Bascom	UConn	Sophomore	
1989–90	Kerry Bascom (2)	UConn	Junior	
1990–91	Kerry Bascom (3)	UConn	Senior	
1991–92	Frances Savage	Miami	Senior	
1992–93	Kris Witfill	Georgetown	Senior	
1993–94	Rebecca Lobo	UConn	Junior	
1994–95	Rebecca Lobo* (2)	UConn	Senior	
1995–96	Jennifer Rizzotti*	UConn	Senior	
1996–97	Kara Wolters	UConn	Senior	
1997–98	Nykesha Sales	UConn	Senior	
1998–99	Svetlana Abrosimova	UConn	Sophomore	
1999–00	Shea Ralph	UConn	Junior	
2000–01	Ruth Riley*	Notre Dame	Senior	
2001–02	Sue Bird*	UConn	Senior	
2002–03	Diana Taurasi*	UConn	Junior	
2003–04	Diana Taurasi* (2)	UConn	Senior	
2004–05	Jacqueline Batteast	Notre Dame	Senior	
2005–06	Cappie Pondexter	Rutgers	Senior	
2006–07	Angel McCoughtry	Louisville	Sophomore	
2007–08	Maya Moore	UConn	Freshman	
2008–09	Maya Moore* (2)	UConn	Sophomore	
2009–10	Tina Charles*	UConn	Senior	
2010–11	Maya Moore* (3)	UConn	Senior	
2011–12	Skylar Diggins	Notre Dame	Junior	
2012–13	Skylar Diggins (2)	Notre Dame	Senior	
2013–14	Marissa Janning	Creighton	Sophomore	
2014–15	Brittany Hrynko	DePaul	Senior	
2015–16	Chanise Jenkins	DePaul	Senior	
2016–17	Brooke Schulte	DePaul	Senior	
2017–18	Allazia Blockton	Marquette	Junior	
2018–19	Natisha Hiedeman	Marquette	Senior	
2019–20	Jaylyn Agnew	Creighton	Senior	
2020–21	Paige Bueckers*	UConn	Freshman	
2021–22	Maddy Siegrist	Villanova	Junior	
2022–23	Maddy Siegrist (2)	Villanova	Senior	
2023–24	Paige Bueckers (2)	UConn	RS Junior	
2024–25	Paige Bueckers (3)	UConn	RS Senior	
2025–26	Sarah Strong*	UConn	Sophomore	

== Winners by school ==
School (years in conference)	Winners	Years
UConn (1979–2013, 2020–present) (Note: Following the split of the original Big East, Cincinnati, Louisville, Rutgers, South Florida, and UConn all remained in the football-sponsoring portion that became the American Athletic Conference.) (Note: UConn joined the current Big East in 2020.)	21	1989, 1990, 1991, 1994, 1995, 1996, 1997, 1998, 1999, 2000, 2002, 2003, 2004, 2008, 2009, 2010, 2011, 2021, 2024, 2025, 2026
Villanova (1980–present)	6	1985, 1986, 1987, 1988, 2022, 2023
Notre Dame (1995–2013) (Note: Notre Dame, Pitt, and Syracuse all left for the Atlantic Coast Conference after the 2012–13 season.)	4	2001, 2005, 2012, 2013
DePaul (2005–present)	3	2015, 2016, 2017
Creighton (2013–present)	2	2014, 2020
Marquette (2005–present)	2	2018, 2019
Georgetown (1979–present)	1	1993
Louisville (2005–2013)	1	2007
Miami (1991–2004) (Note: Miami and Virginia Tech left for the ACC in 2004.)	1	1992
Pittsburgh (1982–2013)	1	1984†
Providence (1979–present)	1	1984†
Rutgers (1995–2013)	1	2006
St. John's (1979–present)	1	1983
Boston College (1979–2005) (Note: Boston College left for the ACC in 2005.)	0	—
Butler (2013–present)	0	—
Cincinnati (2005–2013)	0	—
Seton Hall (1979–present)	0	—
Syracuse (1979–2013)	0	—
USF (2005–2013)	0	—
Virginia Tech (2000–2004)	0	—
West Virginia (1995–2012) (Note: West Virginia left for the Big 12 Conference in 2012.)	0	—
Xavier (2013–present)	0	—

== See also ==
- Big East Conference Men's Basketball Player of the Year
- Big East Conference Men's Basketball Rookie of the Year
