= Marissa Janning =

American basketball player

Personal information
- Listed height: 5 ft 8 in (1.73 m)

Career information
- High school: Watertown-Mayer (Watertown, Minnesota)
- College: Creighton (2012– 2016)
- Position: Guard
- Number: 23

Career highlights
- Big East Player of the Year (2014); 2× First-team All-Big East (2014, 2015); First-team All-MVC (2013); MVC Freshman of the Year (2013); MVC All-Freshman Team (2013); Minnesota Miss Basketball (2012)

Marissa Janning is a college basketball player who played for Creighton University.

== College ==
Janning was named Big East Conference Women's Basketball Player of the Year as a sophomore during the 2013–14 season.

=== Creighton statistics ===
Legend
GP	Games played	GS	Games started	MPG	Minutes per game
FG%	Field goal percentage	3P%	3-point field goal percentage	FT%	Free throw percentage
RPG	Rebounds per game	APG	Assists per game	SPG	Steals per game
BPG	Blocks per game	PPG	Points per game	**Bold**	Career high

Year	Team	GP	Points	FG%	3P%	FT%	RPG	APG	SPG	BPG	PPG
2012-13	Creighton	33	419	**37.8%**	**38.9%**	81.4%	3.5	2.4	**1.2**	0.1	12.7
2013-14	Creighton	**34**	**599**	36.7%	35.1%	**85.5%**	5.2	3.9	0.8	0.2	**17.6**
2014-15	Creighton	31	485	35.5%	36.6%	80.4%	4.5	3.7	1.2	0.2	15.6
2015-16	Creighton	6	64	31.9%	30.0%	75.0%	4.8	**5.2**	0.5	**0.7**	10.7
2016-17	Creighton	32	371	37.2%	27.0%	67.3%	**4.9**	4.6	1.0	0.3	11.6
Career		136	1938	36.5%	34.8%	79.3%	4.5	3.7	1.0	0.2	14.3

== Personal life ==
Janning's brother Matt has played in Europe and in the NBA Development League.
