= Kerry Bascom =

American basketball player

Personal information
- Born: March 3, 1969 (age 57) Exeter, New Hampshire, U.S.
- Listed height: 6 ft 1 in (1.85 m)

Career information
- High school: Epping (Epping, New Hampshire)
- College: UConn (1987–1991)
- Position: Forward
- Number: 24

Career highlights
- Kodak All American (1991); 3× Big East Player of the Year (1989–1991); 3× First-team All-Big East (1989–1991); Big East Tournament MVP (1989); Big East All-Freshman Team (1988)
Medals
Women's basketball
World University Games
Gold medal – first place	1991 Sheffield	Team competition

Kerry Bascom (born March 3, 1969) is an American former women's basketball player. She played forward and center for the Connecticut Huskies (UConn) from 1987 to 1991, scoring 2,177 points, a school record until broken in 1998 by Nykesha Sales. She helped lead the Connecticut team to its first ever Big East Conference regular season championship (1989), first Big East Tournament championship (1989), first NCAA tournament appearance (1989), first NCAA Tournament win (1990), and the first ever NCAA Final Four appearance (1991). Bascom is the first UConn player to be named to a national All America team. She went on to play for the gold medal-winning World University Games team in 1991.

== High school ==
Kerry Bascom attended Epping High School in Epping, New Hampshire, where her graduating class included only 44 students. Schools in New Hampshire in the small school division are allowed to add middle school students to their rosters thus Kerry was able to join the junior varsity team as an eighth grader. She scored 25 points in her first game and averaged 30 points a game on the junior varsity team, so she was added to the varsity team (after an exemption was granted). She scored 12 points in four minutes in her first game. During her sophomore year her team won the Class S (small) basketball championship, and during her junior and senior year her team was runner up in the Class M (medium) championship. Kerry finished high school as Epping's all-time leading scorer with 2,408 points. (ref: Epping High School Sports Annual Record Book). In 1987 Kerry was selected as a Parade High School All-American.

== AAU ==
Bascom had a friend from a rival school call her and invite her to try out for an Amateur Athletic Union (AAU) team in Massachusetts since they didn't have any in the New Hampshire area. Bascom and her friend were two of the 12-member team who all hailed from New Hampshire.

They traveled to Massachusetts every weekend that year, and the following year they started an AAU team in New Hampshire. This team ended up playing together for about five years. Of the 12 players, 11 of them went on to play for Division I colleges.

== College ==
Bascom's mom had been very sick with multiple sclerosis so Bascom wanted to stay close to home. She narrowed her college selection down to UConn, Boston College, Syracuse University, Rutgers University and Boston University. She chose UConn, which was 2½ hours away. Bascom was coach Geno Auriemma's first blue-chip recruit. Her freshman year was challenging as many of the upperclassmen had been recruited by the prior coach. Her freshman roommate was a senior, who would occasionally lock her out of her room.

When Bascom used to tell people she was going to UConn, some thought she meant Yukon—as in the frigid Canadian territory—instead of the University of Connecticut, because at that time the school was not well known. That would all change. In her time at UConn the team had a lot of firsts for the university. The Huskies won the first regular-season Big East title (sophomore year). They also won their first Big East Tournament championship. In her senior year the team went to their first NCAA Final Four trip. As at Epping, Bascom finished her career as the leading scorer in points, with 2,177. In 1998, Nykesha Sales broke the record via a controversial staged layup at the start of a game after suffering a season-ending injury. Bascom graduated with a bachelor's degree in sociology from UConn.

The 6 foot 1 inch (1.85 m) Bascom wore 24 as her uniform number. When Nykesha Sales was considering attending UConn, she asked for number 42; Sales had worn number 24 in high school, but out of respect for Bascom asked to have the digits reversed. Charde Houston later went on to wear number 24.

As of 2009, Bascom's career scoring average of 18.1 per game is the highest among all UConn players. Her scoring average of 22.6 in 1988–89 is the highest single-season scoring average among all Uconn players. In addition, she ranks among the top ten in UConn history. for:

- Career three-pointers (161)
- Career three-point field goal average (39.9%)
- Career free throw percentage (.798)
- Career rebounds (915)
- Career rebound average (7.6)
- Single season points (680, in 90–91; 656 in 88–89; 615 in 89–90)
- Single season scoring average (22.6 in 88–89; 20.5 in 89–90; 20.0 in 90–91)
- Single season goals (246 in 90–91; 244 in 88–89)
- Single season three-point field goal average (.476 in 88–89)
- Single season free throws made (139 in 90–91)
- Single season free throws made (125 in 89–90)
- Single season free throws percentage (.837 in 90–91)

Bascom occupies five of the top ten positions in the most points in a single game list, as well as top ten positions in numerous other single-game categories. Bascom was a member of the inaugural class (2006) of inductees to the University of Connecticut women's basketball "Huskies of Honor" recognition program.

Bascom received a special award on February 5, 2011, as part of the National Girls and Women In Sport Day. Bascom was the recipient of the award recognizing "an individual who has made significant contributions to the advancement of women's sports on the UConn campus".

=== University of Connecticut statistics ===
Kerry Bascom Statistics at University of Connecticut
Year	G	FG	FGA	PCT	3FG	3FGA	PCT	FT	FTA	PCT	REB	AVG	A	TO	B	S	MIN	PTS	AVG
1987–88	27	94	202	0.465	0	3	0.000	38	56	0.679	147	5.4	23	51	4	7	542	226	8.4
1988–89	29	244	440	0.555	60	126	0.476	108	139	0.777	237	8.2	46	79	11	36	874	656	22.6
1989–90	30	219	452	0.485	52	137	0.380	125	154	0.812	271	9.0	65	93	7	45	992	615	20.5
1990–91	34	246	470	0.523	49	142	0.345	139	166	0.837	260	7.6	87	74	5	39	1048	680	20.0
Totals	120	803	1564	0.513	161	408	0.395	410	515	0.796	915	7.6	221	297	27	127	3456	2177	18.1

=== World University Games (1991) ===
Bascom played for the USA team, one of sixteen teams at the fifteenth World University Games (1991) held in Sheffield, England. The team was coached by Tara VanDerveer, and teammates included Lisa Leslie and Dawn Staley. The USA team won all eight games it played, earning the gold medal. Kerry scored 40 points, played in six of the eight games, and hit ten of seventeen three-point attempts, for a team-best 58.8% three-point shooting percentage.

== After college ==
Kerry was Coach Auriemma's first player to go overseas to play basketball (there was no WNBA at that time). She played in Spain for one season. She came home after the season, and married her high school sweetheart. Kerry missed basketball so she went to France to play. After being married a year and realizing that she and her husband had actually only been together for about four weeks that year between her basketball schedule in Europe, and his long hours as a rookie attorney, Kerry decided it was time to come home to be with her husband.

Kerry was hired as a women's assistant basketball coach at the University of New Hampshire which she held for five years starting in 1996. Bascom was a full-time case manager for Community Partners, overseeing services for individuals 21 and over with developmental disabilities in Strafford County, New Hampshire, where she helped train athletes for the Special Olympics.

Kerry and her husband were married for about 15 years but have since divorced, although they still remain friends.

== Awards ==
- 1987 Parade High School All-American
- 1991 NCAA Tournament East Regional Most Outstanding Performer
- Big East Player-of-the-Year 1989
- Big East Player-of-the-Year 1990
- Big East Player-of-the-Year 1991
- Kodak Division I All-American team
- Connecticut Women's Basketball Hall Of Fame
- New England Basketball Hall of Fame
- 2011 – Inducted into the New Hampshire Interscholastic Athletic Association (NHIAA) Hall of Fame

== See also ==
- List of Connecticut women's basketball players with 1000 points
