= Maya Moore =

American basketball player (born 1989)

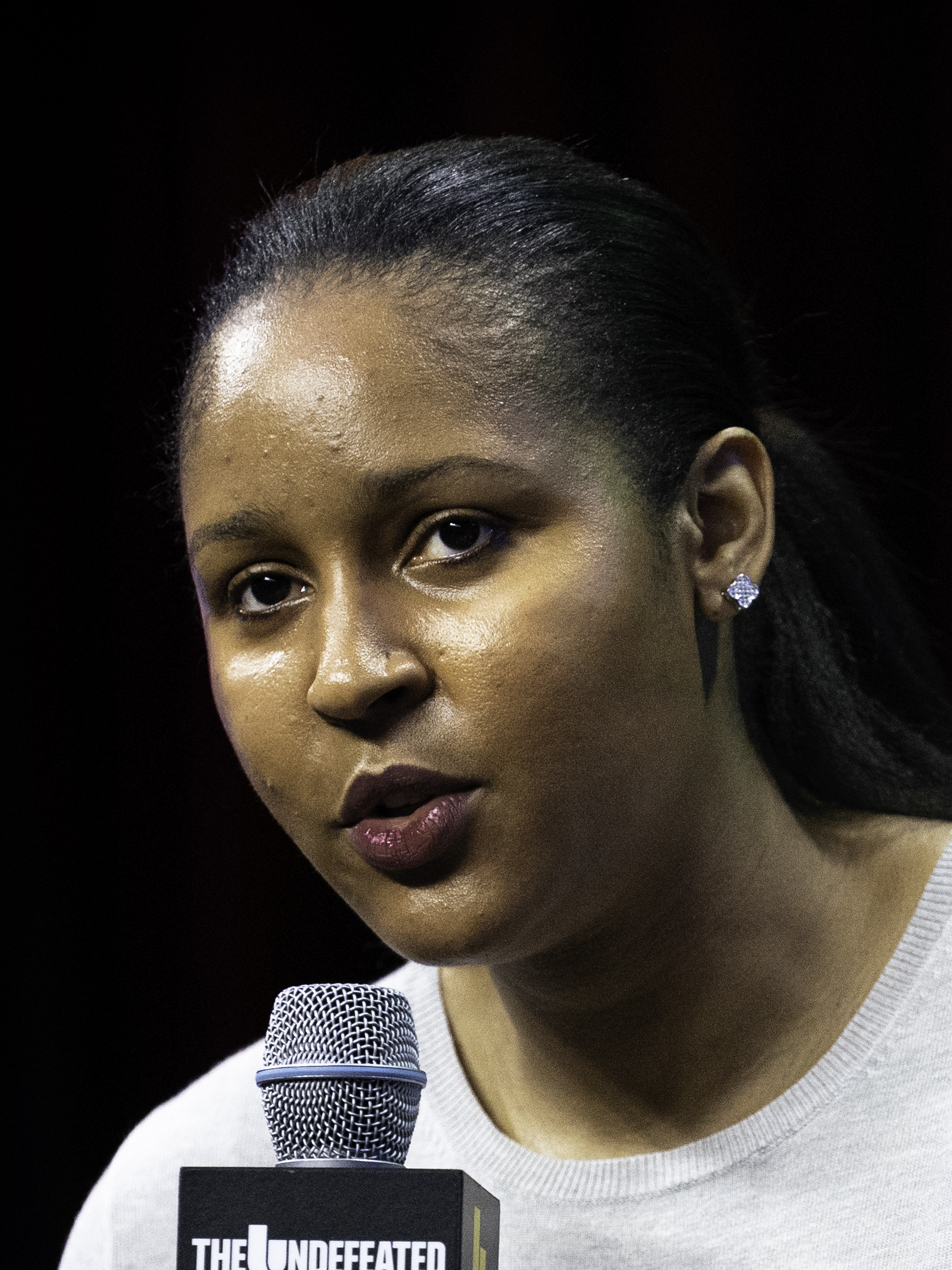
- Moore in 2019

Personal information
- Born: June 11, 1989 (age 37) Jefferson City, Missouri, U.S.
- Listed height: 6 ft 0 in (1.83 m)
- Listed weight: 175 lb (79 kg)

Career information
- High school: Collins Hill (Suwanee, Georgia)
- College: UConn (2007–2011)
- WNBA draft: 2011: 1st round, 1st overall pick
- Drafted by: Minnesota Lynx
- Playing career: 2011–2018
- Position: Power forward
- Number: 23

Career history
- 2011–2018: Minnesota Lynx
- 2011–2012: Ros Casares Valencia
- 2012–2016: Shanxi Flame
- 2018: UMMC Ekaterinburg

Career highlights
- 4× WNBA champion (2011, 2013, 2015, 2017); WNBA Finals MVP (2013); WNBA MVP (2014); 6× WNBA All-Star (2011, 2013–2015, 2017–2018); 3× WNBA All-Star Game MVP (2015, 2017, 2018); 5× All-WNBA First Team (2013–2017); 2× All-WNBA Second Team (2012, 2018); 2× WNBA All-Defensive Second Team (2014, 2017); WNBA steals leader (2018); WNBA scoring leader (2014); USA Basketball Female Athlete of the Year (2014); WNBA Rookie of the Year (2011); WNBA All-Rookie Team (2011); WNBA anniversary teams (20th, 25th); No. 23 retired by Minnesota Lynx; FIBA World Championship MVP (2014); 2× EuroLeague Women champion (2012, 2018); Liga Femenina champion (2012); 3× WCBA champion (2013–2015); 2× NCAA champion (2009–2010); NCAA Tournament MOP (2010); Senior CLASS Award (2011); 4× First-team All-American – AP (2008–2011); 3× CoSIDA Academic All-America First Team (2009–2011); 4× All-American – State Farm Coaches', USBWA (2008–2011); 3× Wade Trophy (2009–2011); 2× Naismith College Player of the Year (2009, 2011); 2× John R. Wooden Award (2009, 2011); 2× AP College Player of the Year (2009, 2011); 2× USBWA Women's National Player of the Year (2009, 2011); 2× Honda Sports Award for basketball (2010, 2011); 2× Honda-Broderick Cup (2010, 2011); 3× Big East Player of the Year (2008, 2009, 2011); 2× Big East Tournament MOP (2009, 2011); 2× Academic All-America of the Year (2010–2011); All-sports Academic All-America of the Year (2011); 4× First-team All-Big East (2008–2011); Big East Freshman of the Year (2008); Big East All-Freshman Team (2008); USBWA National Freshman of the Year (2008); Gatorade Female Athlete of the Year (2007); Gatorade National Player of the Year (2007); MaxPreps National Player of the Year (2007); 2× Naismith Prep Player of the Year (2006, 2007); McDonald's All-American (2007); Morgan Wootten Player of the Year (2007); 2× Miss Georgia Basketball (2006, 2007)
- Stats at WNBA.com
- Stats at Basketball Reference
- Basketball Hall of Fame
- Women's Basketball Hall of Fame
Medals
Representing United States
Olympic Games
Gold medal – first place	2012 London	Team
Gold medal – first place	2016 Rio de Janeiro	Team
World Championship
Gold medal – first place	2010 Czech Republic
Gold medal – first place	2014 Turkey
World University Games
Gold medal – first place	2009 Belgrade	Team
FIBA Under-19 World Cup
Gold medal – first place	2007 Slovakia	Team
FIBA Under-18 Americas Championship
Gold medal – first place	2006 United States	Team

Maya April Moore (born June 11, 1989) is an American social justice advocate and former professional basketball player. Naming her their inaugural Performer of the Year in 2017, Sports Illustrated called Moore the "greatest winner in the history of women's basketball". Moore was selected for the Women's Basketball Hall of Fame in 2024. In 2025, Moore was selected to be inducted into the Naismith Memorial Basketball Hall of Fame.

In high school, Moore was the National Gatorade Player of the Year, the Gatorade Female Athlete of the Year, and a McDonald's All-American. She played forward for the UConn women's basketball team and won back to back national championships in 2009 and 2010. She was selected as the John Wooden Award winner in 2009 after leading Connecticut to an undefeated national championship. The following season, Moore led Connecticut to its second straight national championship and continued its overall undefeated streak at 78; in the 2010–11 season, she led the Huskies in extending that streak to an NCAA both-gender record (all divisions) of 90. That season, Moore became the first female basketball player to sign with Air Jordan. After the 2017 season, her win–loss record in the U.S. since high school was 497–78.

Moore was the first overall pick in the 2011 WNBA draft and joined a Minnesota Lynx team that already featured all-star caliber players in Seimone Augustus, Rebekkah Brunson, and Lindsay Whalen. Moore has won four WNBA championships (2011, 2013, 2015, and 2017), a WNBA Most Valuable Player Award (2014), a WNBA Finals MVP Award (2013), three WNBA All-Star Game MVPs (2015, 2017, and 2018), two Olympic gold medals (2012 and 2016), a WNBA Scoring Title (2014), and the WNBA Rookie of the Year Award (2011). She has also been selected to six WNBA All-Star teams and seven All-WNBA teams. The relative timing of the seasons of the WNBA and the top leagues in other countries has allowed Moore to compete throughout the year. In 2012, she won both the Spanish league title and EuroLeague title playing for Ros Casares Valencia. From 2013 to 2015, Moore also won the Chinese league title every year. Moore won a second Euroleague title playing for UMMC Ekaterinburg in 2018.

Moore is one of 11 women to earn an Olympic gold medal, an NCAA Championship, a FIBA World Cup gold and a WNBA Championship. Moore was included in Time's 100 Most Influential People of 2020.

== Early life ==
Moore was born on June 11, 1989, in Jefferson City, Missouri. She is the daughter of Kathryn Moore. Moore had her first exposure to basketball at the age of three when her mother mounted a hoop on the back door of their apartment. She attended Moreau Heights Elementary School as a child, then later on went to Creekland Middle School.

=== High school ===
Moore was a four-year starter at Collins Hill High School in Gwinnett County, near Suwanee, Georgia, where she had a 125–3 record with the Eagles. Moore was named to the USA Today Freshman and Sophomore All-America Teams. During her junior year in 2005–06, averaged 23.2 points, 11.3 rebounds, 4.6 assists and 5.4 steals as a junior at Collins Hill. Moore was named the Naismith Prep Player of the Year. She was only the second junior to win the Naismith award Her first dunk was one-handed off an alley-oop pass in warm-ups at a dunk contest in Charlotte, NC in December 2005. She was 16 at the time.

As a senior, she averaged 25.5 points, 12.1 rebounds, 4.0 assists and 4.3 steals. In December 2006, she led the Collins Hill Eagles over Poly (Long Beach, California) by a score of 75–61, resulting in her being selected unanimously as the Most Valuable Player of the Tournament of Champions in Chandler, Arizona. In the title game of the "T-Mobile Invitational" in Seattle, she scored 48 points in a win over St. Elizabeth. Moore helped lead her high school to four consecutive state championships appearances, including three Georgia state titles and the 2007 National Championship. Moore is a three-time Georgia 5A Player of the Year and 2007 Miss Georgia Basketball. Moore finished as Collins High School's all-time leader in points (2,664) rebounds (1,212), assists (407) and steals (467).

In addition to basketball, she also participated in track and field. Moore finished as the runner-up in the high jump at the 2005 Georgia State 5A Championships. She was also an excellent student, as she graduated from high school with a 4.0 grade point average. Moore was the recipient of the Atlanta Journal Cup. Moore announced that she would play college basketball at the University of Connecticut. Moore is only the second player to win the Naismith Prep Player of the Year Award following both junior and senior prep seasons, joining Candace Parker. Moore is also a two-time Parade Magazine First Team All-America, three-time Georgia 5A Player of the Year, three-time Street & Smith All-America Team selection, four-time Georgia Class 5A All-State First Team selection, and a member of the 2006 Sports Illustrated All-America Team. Moore received several awards for her performance her senior year, including the 2007 WBCA National Player of the Year, 2007 Parade Magazine All-America of the Year, and 2007 Morgan Wootten Award Winner which is presented to the McDonald's All-America Player of the Year.

=== Georgia Metros ===
Maya Moore played for the Georgia Metros 16U Nike Travel Team in both 2005 and 2006. The Georgia Metros went 73–6 in those two travel seasons, and Maya led them to four National Championships: The AAU 16U National Championship in Orlando (where she was the MVP, as a 15-year-old) in 2005; the US Junior Nationals Championship in DC, twice, in both 2005 and 2006; and the Nike Nationals Championship in 2006. Notable teammates while with the Georgia Metros included Kelly Cain (Tennessee), Ashley Houts (Georgia), Alicia Manning (Tennessee), Morgan Toles (Auburn/FSU), Charenee Stephens (South Carolina), Taylor Turnbow (LSU), Jordan Greenleaf (Auburn), and D'Andra Moss (VCU).

== College career ==
=== Freshman year ===
Moore was unanimously selected as the Big East Preseason Freshman of the Year by the league's coaches. On November 11, 2007, Moore made her collegiate debut for UConn, recording 21 points, 10 rebounds, four assists and four steals in a 98–35 win over Stony Brook. Moore scored 678 points, the most by a freshman in program history. She also set six UConn freshman records. After leading UConn to the Big East regular-season title, she was named a unanimous Big East Freshman of the Year and became the first freshman, male or female, to be named the Big East Player of the Year. She was also a unanimous first-team All-Big East and Big East All-Freshman Team selection. Moore was a 10-time Big East Freshman of the Week, setting a conference record. In the Final Four, Moore recorded 20 points, nine rebounds and three blocks in an 82–73 loss to Stanford and finished the season with a 36–2 record. Moore was a unanimous first-team All-American: she earned first-team All-American honors from the AP and the USBWA, and made the Women's Basketball Coaches Association (WBCA) Coaches' All-America Team. Additionally, she was awarded the USBWA National Freshman of the Year presented by the United States Basketball Writers Association.

=== Sophomore year ===
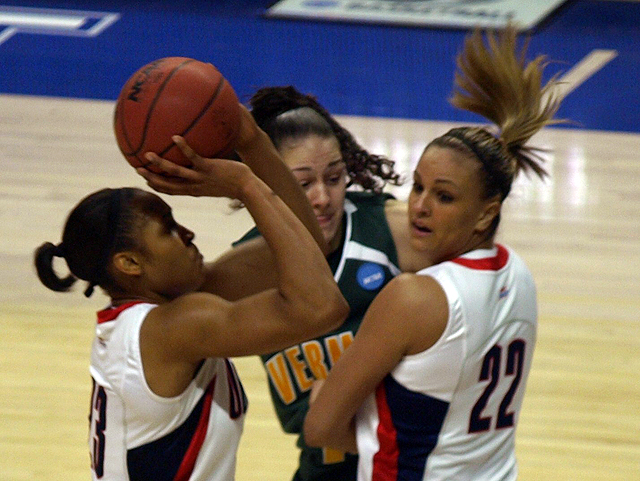
Moore playing in 2009 for UConn

On November 16, 2008, Moore made her sophomore season debut, recording 20 points, 14 rebounds and six assists in an 82–71 win over Georgia Tech. On January 17, 2009, she posted 40 points and 13 rebounds in a 107–53 win over Syracuse. Moore became fastest UConn player to reach 1,000 career points and set the mark for number of 3-point field goals made in the Big East history at 10. At the end of the regular season, she was unanimously named Big East Player of the Year and first-team All-Big East by the league's coaches and media. In the Big East Tournament, Moore averaged 21.0 points, 8.7 rebounds, 2.0 steals and 2.3 blocks. She was named most outstanding player (MOP) of the tournament. Moore helped lead her team to an undefeated 39–0 season and the 2009 National Championship, and was named to the 2009 NCAA Final Four All-Tournament team. Moore won the AP Player of the Year (first sophomore to win the award), Naismith College Player of the Year, USBWA National Player of the Year and the John R. Wooden Award and the Wade Trophy. She was a unanimous first-team All-American for a second straight season, earning first-team recognition from the AP and USBWA and making the WBCA Coaches' All-America Team. In July 2009, she won the Best Female College Athlete ESPY Award.

=== Junior year ===
Moore led her team to a second straight undefeated 39–0 season and the 2010 National Championship. She was named the Most Outstanding Player of the tournament. On March 7, Moore recorded 16 points, 14 rebounds, seven assists, and five steals in a 77–41 win over Syracuse in the quarterfinals of the 2010 Big East tournament. She became the fifth player in school history to score 2,000 points. Moore was awarded the Wade Trophy as the best women's college basketball player in NCAA Division I. After the regular season, she was named the BIG EAST Scholar Athlete of the Year; was named a first-team All-American by the Associated Press and the USBWA, with the AP vote being unanimous. Moore was also named a first-team Academic All-American by the College Sports Information Directors of America. Moore won Best Women's College Basketball Player at the 2010 ESPYs.

=== Senior year ===
In her final year at UConn, Moore posted career highs in scoring (22.3 ppg), assists (4.1 apg) and steals (2.2 spg). On March 29, Moore became the first player in school history to reach 3,000 points. She won her second Naismith College Player of the Year award, her third straight Wade Trophy (only player in history – freshmen are not eligible for this award), her second Associated Press Women's College Basketball Player of the Year award and her second USBWA Women's National Player of the Year award; she was also voted Big East Player of The Year (third time) and a fourth straight unanimous First-Team All-American in WBCA, USBWA and AP polls (second player ever after Oklahoma's Courtney Paris). At the Final Four, UConn was upset by Big East rival Notre Dame, 72–63, and finished the season with a 36–2 record. Moore was named to the Final Four All-Tournament Team.

During her college career Moore won 150 games and only lost four, amassing a total 3036 points (first Husky ever and fourth all-time in NCAA division I women's basketball), 1276 rebounds (second Husky ever), 310 steals (third Husky ever), 544 assists (sixth Husky ever) and 204 blocks (fourth Husky ever); she is the only women's basketball player in Division I history to record 2500 points, 1000 rebounds, 500 assists, 250 steals and 150 blocked shots. On February 28, she was enshrined in the Huskies of Honor (3rd time ever for an active player).

Moore was also an impressive college student: she graduated with a 3.7 GPA, earning the Elite 88 Award, and was named Cosida Academic All-America First-Team in 2009, 2010 and 2011, Cosida Academic All-America of the Year in 2010 and 2011 (1st player to ever repeat) and All-sports Academic All-America of the Year in 2011.

After graduation, Moore was selected by the Minnesota Lynx as the first overall pick in the 2011 WNBA draft (fourth time for a Husky), also becoming the first female basketball player signed to the Jordan Brand.

== Professional career ==
Maya Moore's professional career, like her high school and college career, has been filled with championships. In her first three years, she made three WNBA finals, one Eurobasket final, and two WCBA finals, and won five of the six possible championships she could have. Along the way, she has established herself as one of the best professional women's players in the game. In 2015, she won the WNBA All-Star MVP award. This makes her one of only three players, the others being Lisa Leslie, and Candace Parker who have won the MVP award for the WNBA regular-season, the WNBA finals, and the All-Star game.

=== WNBA ===
==== 2011: Rookie season and first championship ====
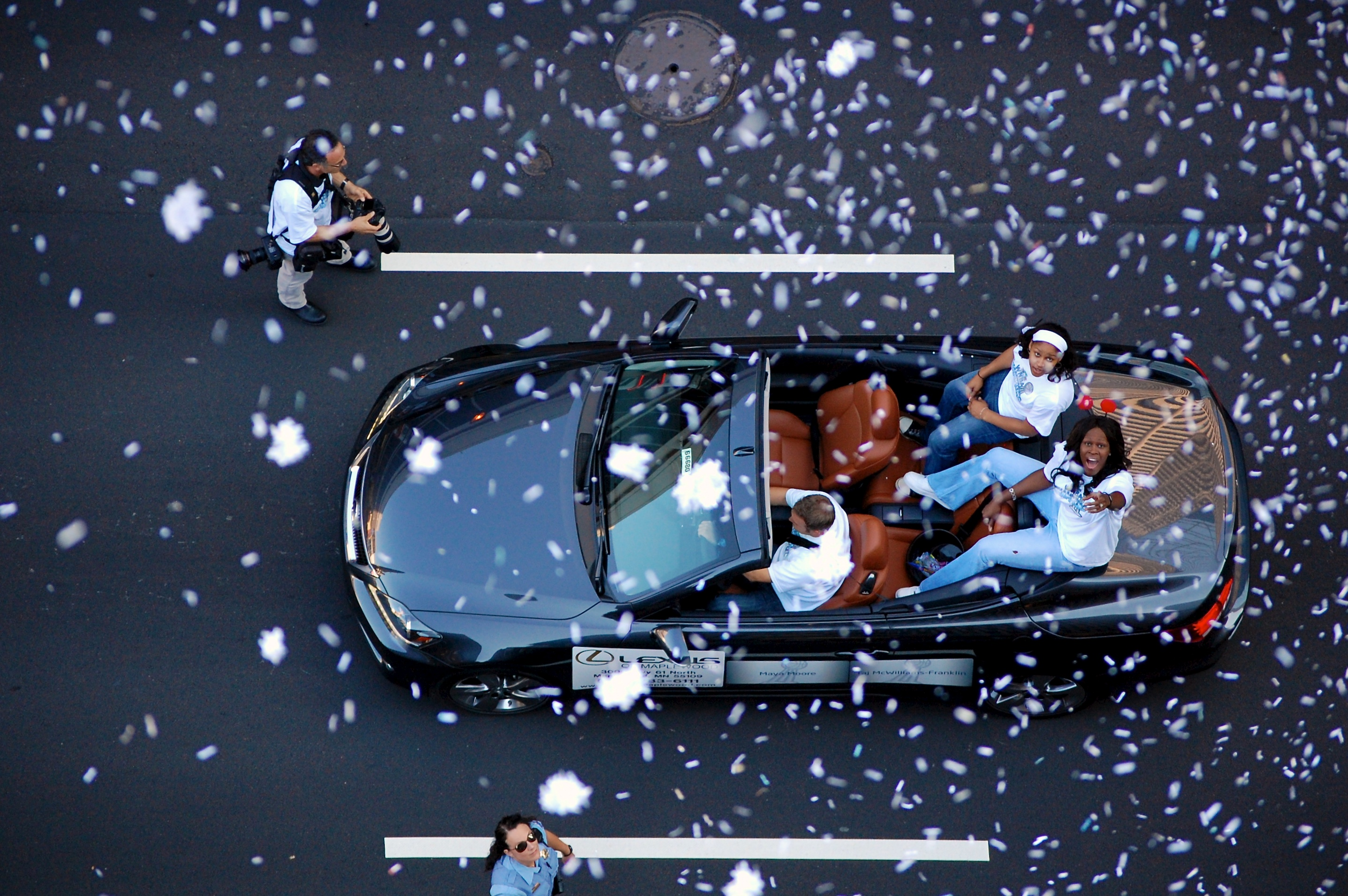
Moore (top) and forward Taj McWilliams-Franklin in 2011 victory parade

Moore was selected 1st overall in the 2011 WNBA draft by the Minnesota Lynx. She joined a team that already featured talented players like Lindsay Whalen, Rebekkah Brunson, and Seimone Augustus, and helped the Lynx to their best record in franchise history, as well as the best record in the WNBA. Moore was named WNBA Rookie of the Month for July and August, and played in the WNBA All-Star Game. Though Moore admitted that she struggled at times to adapt to the extraordinary level of talent in the WNBA, her play still earned her Rookie of the Year honors.

During the playoffs, Moore was her team's second-leading scorer. She led her team in scoring once, in the final game of the Western Conference finals, when she poured in 21 points, including six three-pointers. In October 2011, Maya became only the second player in league history to win Rookie of the Year honors and a WNBA championship in the same year.

==== 2012–2013: More championship contention and Finals MVP season ====
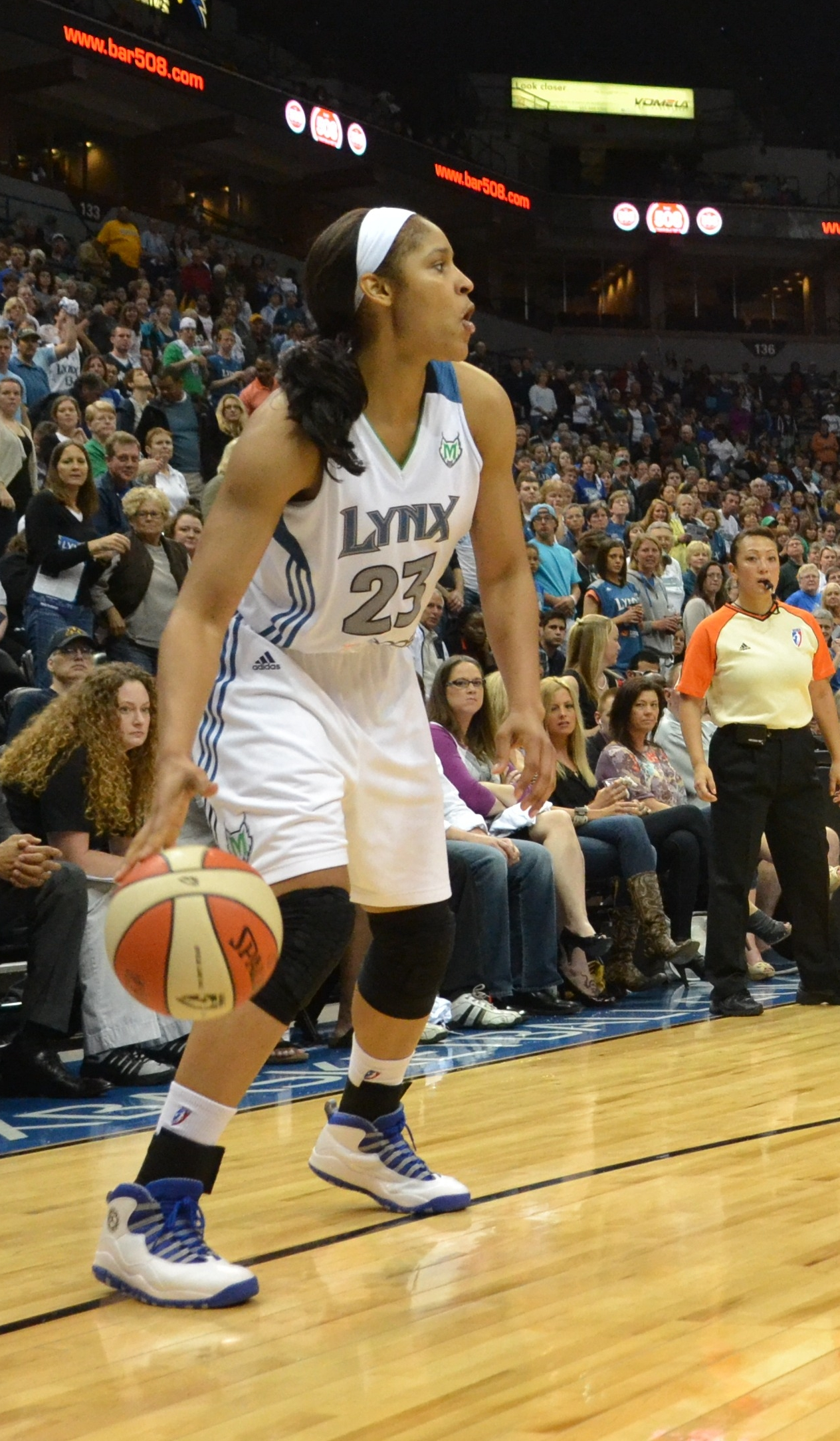
Moore handling the ball in a 2012 home game.

In 2012, Moore helped the Lynx begin the season with a 10–0 run, the best start in WNBA history. The Lynx went on to equal 2011's 27–7 mark, finishing as the top seed in the WNBA Playoffs for a second straight year. The Lynx advanced to the 2012 WNBA Finals, for the second straight season, but fell to the Indiana Fever. In 2013, Moore elevated her game, she led the Lynx in points, and became the first player in WNBA history to lead the league in both three-point field goals and three-point shooting percentage. Moore was twice selected WNBA Western Conference Player of the Month, and three times selected WNBA Western Conference Player of the Week. Meanwhile, the Lynx once again had the best record in the WNBA, finishing 26–8. The Lynx swept through the playoffs, winning their second WNBA championship. Moore was named WNBA Finals MVP, leading her team in scoring two of the three games in the Finals.

==== 2014: MVP season ====
In the fourth game of the 2014 season, Moore set a new WNBA record by scoring 30 or more points in four consecutive games. On July 22, 2014, Maya scored a career-high 48 points, the second highest single-game total in WNBA history. She also had another 40-point game just a week later. She then set a WNBA record by scoring 30+ points in twelve games in one season. She would end up averaging a career-high 23.9 points per game and for the first time in her career, Moore won the WNBA Most Valuable Player Award. Minnesota entered the playoffs as the number 2 seed in the Western Conference. They had a record of 25–9, the 2nd best record in the Western Conference and also the entire WNBA. They played the number 3 seed of the Western Conference, the San Antonio Stars, in the Western Conference Semifinals. The Lynx swept the Stars 2–0. Then they faced the number 1 overall seeded Phoenix Mercury in the Western Conference Finals. They lost Game 1 85–71, as Maya scored fewer than 10 points for the first and only time the entire season. But in Game 2, she rebounded with 32 points and led her team to an 82–77 victory. They played in Phoenix for the 3rd and final game, and lost 96–78, failing to make the WNBA Finals for the 1st time in 4 seasons.

==== 2015: All-Star MVP season and third championship ====
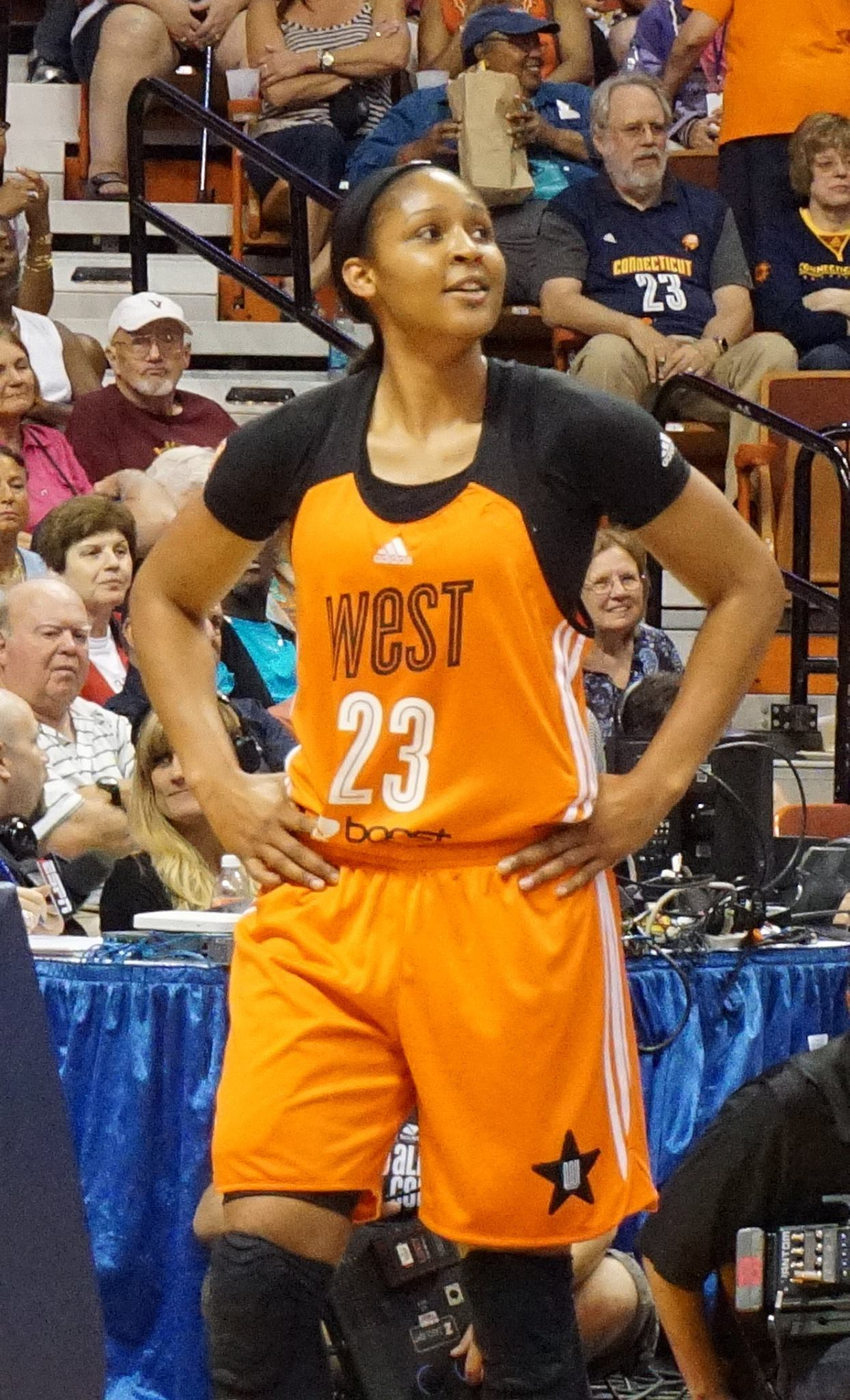
Maya Moore at the 2015 All-Star game, where she won the MVP award

Prior to the 2015 season, Moore re-signed with the Lynx to a multi-year deal once her rookie contract expired. In the 2015 season, Moore was named to the 2015 WNBA All-Star Game and was awarded MVP after scoring a WNBA All-Star Game record, 30 points. Midway through the season, the Lynx had traded for Sylvia Fowles to bolster the Lynx's roster at the center position. The Lynx were first place in the Western Conference, advanced all the way to the finals and won its third WNBA championship in five years by beating the Indiana Fever, three games to two. One of the memorable highlights of the finals was in Game 3 where Moore hit a game-winning three-pointer at the buzzer. She was also named to the All-WNBA First Team in 2015.

==== 2016–2017: Finals loss and fourth championship ====
In 2016, Moore was chosen to the WNBA Top 20@20, a list of the league's best 20 players ever in celebration of the WNBA's twentieth anniversary. She was the youngest of the 20 winners. During the 2016 season, Moore averaged 19.3 points per game and the Lynx remained a potent, championship contending team, finishing with a new franchise best 28–6 record. With the WNBA's new playoff format in effect, the Lynx were the number 1 seed in the league with a double-bye to the semi-finals (the last round before the WNBA Finals) facing the Phoenix Mercury. The Lynx defeated the Mercury in a 3-game sweep, advancing to the WNBA Finals for the fifth time in six years. The Lynx were up against the Los Angeles Sparks, making it the second time in league history where two teams from the same conference faced each other in the Finals due to the new playoff format. During a loss in Game 1, Moore passed Diana Taurasi for most points scored in WNBA Finals history (262). Facing a 2–1 deficit, Moore took over in Game 4, scoring a game-high 31 points to lead the Lynx to an 85–79 win, forcing a Game 5. The Lynx would end up losing Game 5 77–76 off a game-winning shot by Nneka Ogwumike as the Sparks became 2016 WNBA Champions.

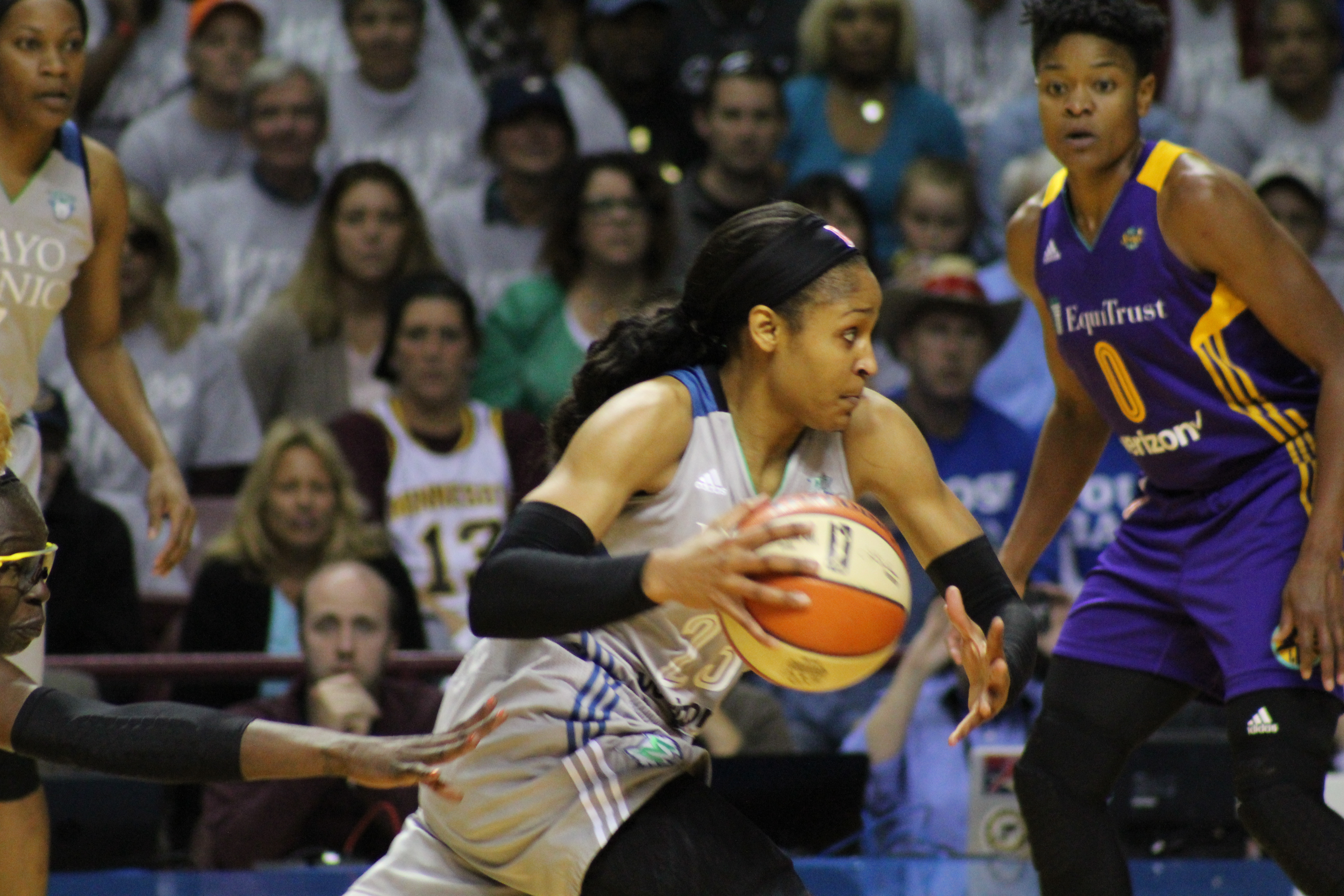
Moore during the Lynx's championship-clinching game 5 of the 2017 WNBA Finals

In the 2017 season, Moore was voted into the 2017 WNBA All-Star Game, making it her fifth all-star game appearance. Moore won her second All-Star MVP award after scoring a team-high 23 points for the Western Conference All-Stars team in a 130–121 victory. With Fowles being the more focal point of the Lynx's offense, Moore would be the second highest scoring player on the team with 17.3 ppg. On August 12, 2017, the Lynx made history as they defeated the Indiana Fever 111–52, marking it the largest margin of victory in WNBA history, they also exploded on a league record 40–0 scoring run during the game. The Lynx once again finished as the number 1 seed in the league with a 27–7 record, receiving a double-bye to the semi-finals. In the semi-finals, the Lynx defeated the Washington Mystics in a 3-game sweep, advancing to the WNBA Finals for the sixth time in seven years, setting up a rematch with the Sparks. The Lynx would avenge the previous season's Finals loss, defeating the Sparks in five games to win their fourth WNBA championship in seven years, tying the now-defunct Houston Comets for most championship titles.

==== 2018–2022: New challenges and retirement ====
On July 22, 2018, Moore scored a season-high 38 points in an 80–75 victory over the Mercury. In the 2018 season, Moore was voted into the 2018 WNBA All-Star Game and would win her third All-Star MVP award, after leading Team Parker to a 119–112 victory with 18 points. Moore led the team in scoring with 18 ppg as the Lynx finished with number 7 seed with an 18–16 record. This was first time in 8 years where the Lynx did not finish as a top 2 seed in the league. They would face off against the Los Angeles Sparks in the first round elimination game, they lost 75–68, ending their run of three consecutive finals appearances.

In February 2019, Moore wrote for The Players' Tribune that she would miss the upcoming season to focus on family and ministry dreams. In January 2020, she announced that she would once again miss the upcoming WNBA season as well as the 2020 Olympic games in order to focus on her advocacy for criminal justice reform.

From 2019 to 2023, Moore took a hiatus from her WNBA career to focus on reform in the American justice system. On January 16, 2023, Moore announced on Good Morning America that she was officially retiring from basketball.

=== EuroLeague and China ===
==== 2011–2012: EuroLeague and Spanish champions ====
Moore signed with the Spanish club Ros Casares Valencia for the 2011–2012 season. She joined the team late due to her title run with the Lynx.

In 10 EuroLeague Women games, Moore averaged 12.7 points, 6.2 rebounds and 2.6 assists, helping Ros Casares win its first ever EuroLeague championship on April 1, 2012.

Three weeks later, Ros Casares also won the Spanish domestic league (Liga Femenina de Baloncesto) title, with Moore scoring a team-high 20 points in the April 24 final. The win over Perfumerías Avenida also revenged the March loss in the Copa de la Reina (Queen's Cup) final, when Moore scored a game-high 24.

Moore defending an inbound pass during a January 2014 WCBA game in Shanghai.

==== 2012–2015: 3-peats in China ====
In 2012, Moore signed with the Chinese club Shanxi Flame, playing under Spanish coach Lucas Mondelo. It was the club's first year in the Women's Chinese Basketball Association, and they started the season 0–2 with American import Ebony Hoffman. As soon as Moore arrived and replaced Hoffman (since the league only allows 1 non-Asian player per team), the team won 10 in a row. In her third game, she had 60 points, 13 rebounds, 6 blocks and 5 steals against Yunnan. Moore finished her first season in Shanxi averaging 37.3 points, 12.1 rebounds, 4.3 assists and 3.5 steals per game, leading the Flame to the championship in a 3–1 series over Zhejiang.

In Moore's second year with Shanxi, she again took her team to the finals, averaging 43.3 points per game in a 3–1 series win over Beijing. It was Moore's fifth professional championship in three years. For the season she averaged 39.3 points, 11.8 rebounds, 4.8 assists and 4.3 steals per game.

In the 2014–2015 season, Shanxi won its third straight title, beating the Brittney Griner-led Beijing 3–1 in the finals after dropping the first game. She averaged 30.0 points, 9.2 rebounds, 3.7 assists and 3.6 steals per game for the season while fighting a knee injury.

Despite the language barrier Moore is well-liked in Shanxi, not solely for her on-court dominance but also for her humility and friendly interactions with fans, who called her the "Invincible Queen" (不败女王). For her contributions to the city, she was awarded "Honorary Citizen of Taiyuan" by Taiyuan's municipal government.

==== 2018: Return to the EuroLeague and Second Championship ====
On January 2, 2018, Russian basketball club UMMC Ekaterinburg announced that Maya Moore had joined their team for the remainder of the 2017/2018 EuroLeague season. Moore would go on to average 20.6 points, 6.6 rebounds, and 5.2 assists with UMMC. UMMC would win each of their final six games of the regular season. On April 22, UMMC won the EuroLeague Championship, with Moore scoring 17 points, dishing out 7 assists, and recording 4 steals in the final game.

=== United States national team ===
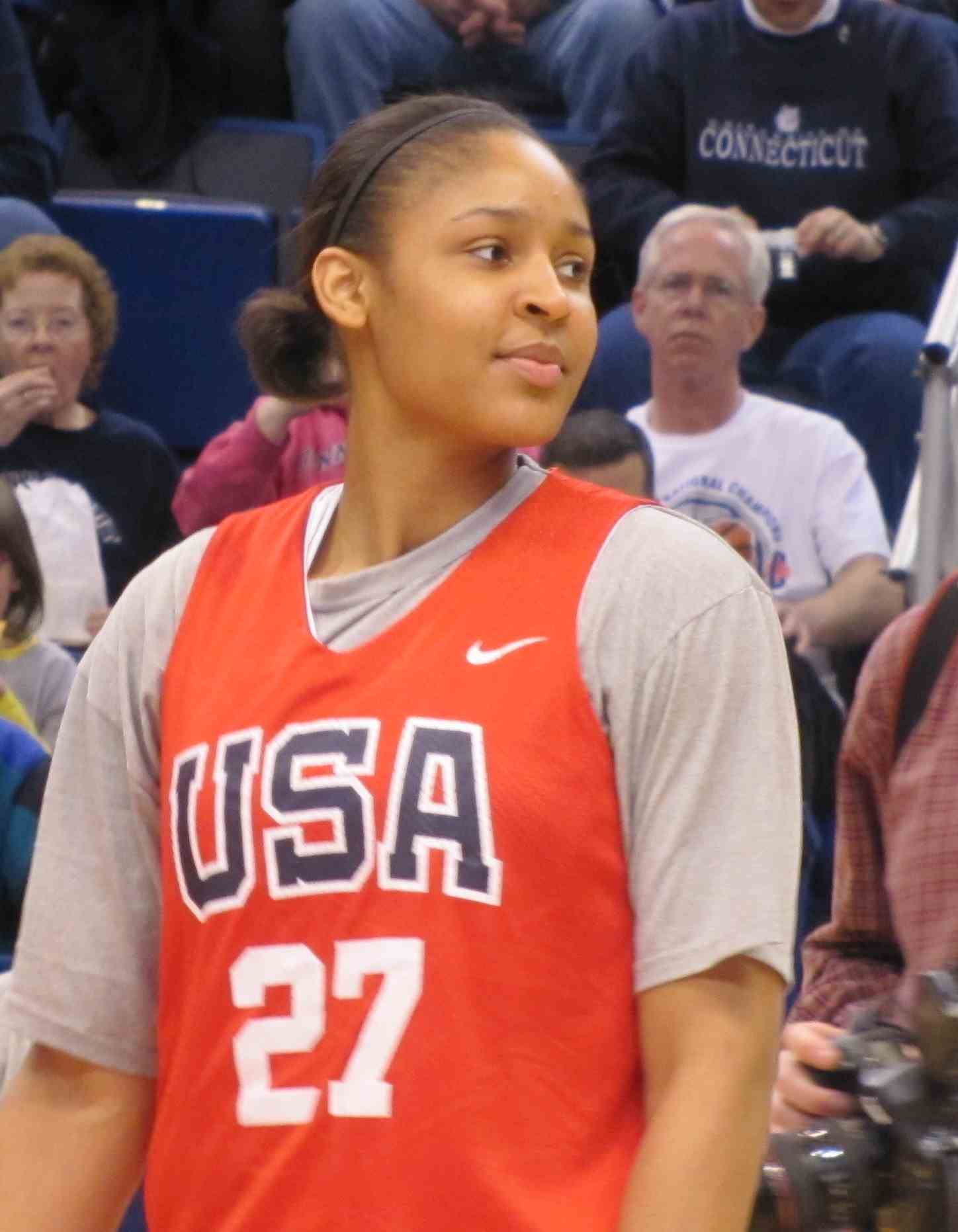
Moore playing for the USA national team against the Select team.

Moore was invited to the USA Basketball Women's National Team training camp in the fall of 2009, one of only three college players and the only junior to be invited to the training camp. The team selected to participate at the 2010 FIBA World Championship and the 2012 Olympics was chosen from these players. At the conclusion of the training camp, the team traveled to Ekaterinburg, Russia, where they competed in the 2009 UMMC Ekaterinburg International Invitational.

Moore was one of twenty players named to the national team pool. Twelve of this group were chosen to represent the US at the 2010 World Championships and the 2012 Olympics.

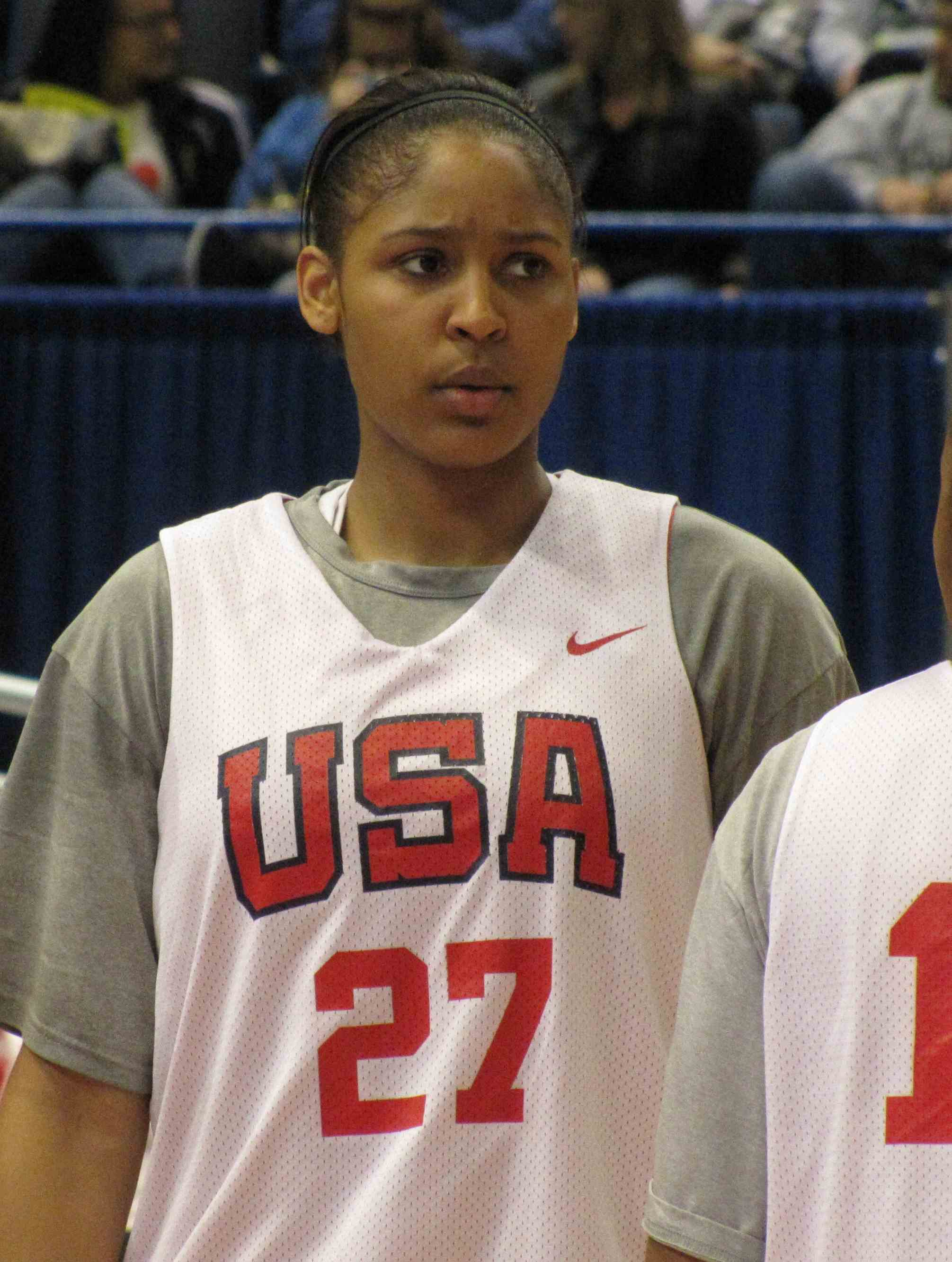
Moore playing for the USA Select team against the USA national team.

The USA National team began training in April 2010 to prepare for the FIBA World Championship starting in September 2010. Moore was one of the players selected for the training sessions, run by the national team coach Geno Auriemma. The teams played informal scrimmages, with one team made up of the players expected to be on the national team, and the other team made up of invited all-star college players, referred to as the select team. Although Moore was still in college, she was invited to be part of the national team. In the first two ten-minute games, Moore played with the national team and helped them to two wins. Then Moore switched jerseys, and played for the select team. In both games, the select team won, with Moore making the assist to put the team ahead, then stealing the ball and making the game winning shot in the final seconds. Moore ended up being on the winning side in all four games.

Moore was named as one of the national team members to represent the USA Basketball team in the WNBA versus USA Basketball. This game replaced the WNBA All-Star game with WNBA All-Stars versus USA Basketball, as part of the preparation for the FIBA World Championship for Women to be held in the Czech Republic during September and October 2010. Moore was selected to be a member of the National team representing the US at the World Championship. The team was coached by Geno Auriemma. Because many team members were still playing in the WNBA until just prior to the event, the team had only one day of practice with the entire team before leaving for Ostrava and Karlovy Vary. Even with limited practice, the team managed to win its first game against Greece by 26 points. The team continued to dominate with victory margins exceeding 20 points in the first five games. Several players shared scoring honors, with Swin Cash, Angel McCoughtry, Moore, Diana Taurasi, Lindsay Whalen, and Sylvia Fowles all ending as high scorer in the first few games. The sixth game was against undefeated Australia — the US jumped out to a 24-point lead and ultimately prevailed 83–75. Team USA won its next two games by over 30 points, then faced the host team, the Czech Republic, in the championship game. The US team had only a five-point lead at halftime, which was then cut to three points, but the Czechs never got closer. Team USA went on to win the championship and gold medal. Moore averaged 8.7 points per game.

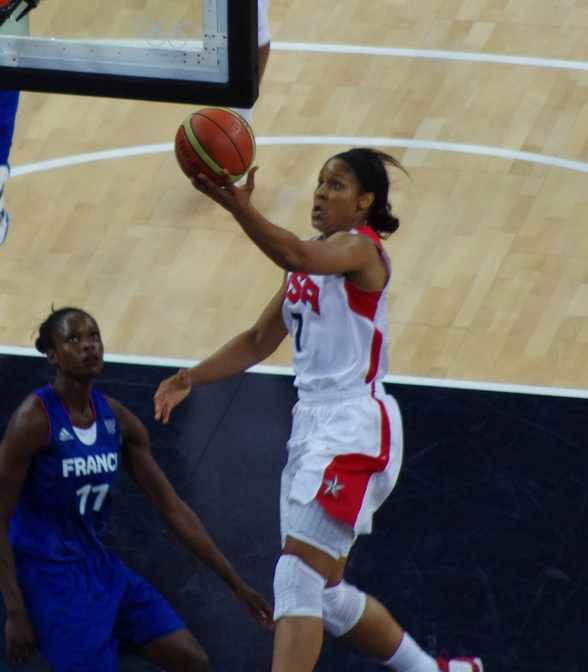
Moore in the 2012 Olympics

Moore was one of 21 finalists for the 2012 U.S. Women's Olympic Basketball Team Roster. The 20 WNBA players, plus one collegiate player (Brittney Griner), were selected by the USA Basketball Women's National Team Player Selection Committee to compete for the final roster to represent the US at the 2012 Summer Olympics in London. Moore won a gold medal with Team USA in 2012, in doing so joining Sheryl Swoopes, Cynthia Cooper-Dyke, Ruth Riley, Tamika Catchings and fellow UConn alums Kara Wolters, Swin Cash, Sue Bird, and Diana Taurasi on the elite list of female basketball players to have won NCAA titles, WNBA Championships and Olympic gold medals.

Moore was one of 33 finalists for the U.S. Women's FIBA World Championship roster. The 32 WNBA players, plus one collegiate player (Breanna Stewart), were selected by the USA Basketball Women's National Team Player Selection Committee to compete for the final roster to represent the US at the FIBA World Championship for Women in Turkey during September and October 2014. Moore made the final roster of 12 players, announced on September 23, 2014. Moore won the gold medal with the team in 2014, having now won 3 gold medals with the U.S. team. She was named to the all-tournament team and won the tournament MVP award.

USA Basketball named Moore to the squad that would play at the 2016 Summer Olympics in Rio de Janeiro, which would be her second Olympic tournament. Moore earned her second gold medal, helping the US overcome Spain 101–72 in the final.

== Basketball statistics ==
=== High school ===
Season	Team	GP	PPG	RPG	APG	SPG
2004–2005	Collins Hill High School	32	19.4	8.6	3.1	2.8
2005–2006	Collins Hill High School	32	23.2	11.3	4.6	5.4
2006-2007	Collins Hill High School	34	25.5	12.1	4.0	4.3

Over four seasons, Moore played in 128 games and averaged 19.3 points, 8.6 rebounds, and 3.5 steals per game.

=== College ===
Legend
GP	Games played	GS	Games started	MPG	Minutes per game
FG%	Field goal percentage	3P%	3-point field goal percentage	FT%	Free throw percentage
RPG	Rebounds per game	APG	Assists per game	SPG	Steals per game
BPG	Blocks per game	PPG	Points per game	**Bold**	Career high

*	Denotes seasons in which Moore won an NCAA Championship

Year	Team	GP	Points	FG%	3P%	FT%	RPG	APG	SPG	BPG	PPG
2007–08	Connecticut	38	678	.543	.420	.743	7.6	3.1	1.7	1.6	17.8
2008–09*	Connecticut	39	754	.521	.398	.780	8.9	3.3	1.9	1.5	19.3
2009–10*	Connecticut	39	736	.515	.417	.790	8.3	3.8	2.1	1.0	18.9
2010–11	Connecticut	38	868	.524	.384	.843	8.2	4.0	2.3	1.2	22.8
Career		154	3,036	.525	.404	.798	8.3	3.5	2.0	1.3	19.7

=== WNBA ===
Legend
GP	Games played	GS	Games started	MPG	Minutes per game	RPG	Rebounds per game
APG	Assists per game	SPG	Steals per game	BPG	Blocks per game	PPG	Points per game
TO	Turnovers per game	FG%	Field-goal percentage	3P%	3-point field-goal percentage	FT%	Free-throw percentage
**Bold**	Career best	°	League leader

†	Denotes seasons in which Moore won a WNBA championship

==== Regular season ====
Year	Team	GP	GS	MPG	FG%	3P%	FT%	RPG	APG	SPG	BPG	TO	PPG
2011^{†}	Minnesota	**34**	**34**	29.0	.439	.369	.787	4.6	2.6	1.4	0.5	**1.4**	13.2
2012	Minnesota	**34**	**34**	29.7	.465	.388	.879	6.0	3.6	1.5	0.6	1.8	16.4
2013^{†}	Minnesota	**34**	**34**	31.4	**.509**	**.453**°	.882	6.2	3.0	1.7	**1.0**	1.7	18.5
2014	Minnesota	**34**	**34**	**34.7**	.481	.335	**.884**	**8.1**	3.4	**1.9**	0.8	2.4	**23.9**°
2015^{†}	Minnesota	33	33	33.4	.420	.359	.855	6.7	3.5	1.6	0.7	2.3	20.6
2016	Minnesota	**34**	**34**	29.7	.448	.404	.868	5.1	**4.2**	1.5	0.7	2.3	19.3
2017^{†}	Minnesota	**34**	**34**	31.3	.442	.411	.858	5.0	3.5	1.8	0.4	1.7	17.3
2018	Minnesota	**34**	**34**	31.8	.423	.365	.833	5.1	2.6	1.7°	0.3	1.7	18.0
Career	8 years, 1 team	271	271	31.2	.453	.384	.860	5.9	3.3	1.7	0.6	1.9	18.4

==== Postseason ====
Year	Team	GP	GS	MPG	FG%	3P%	FT%	RPG	APG	SPG	BPG	TO	PPG
2011^{†}	Minnesota	8	8	27.9	.458	.400	.690	5.9	2.3	1.0	0.6	1.8	13.8
2012	Minnesota	9	9	33.0	.429	.433	.913	5.2	2.8	1.0	0.6	1.7	16.6
2013^{†}	Minnesota	7	7	32.7	**.531**	.400	.882	5.3	2.7	1.6	0.4	**1.4**	20.9
2014	Minnesota	5	5	36.0	.440	.333	**1.000**	6.0	**5.4**	**2.8**	**1.6**	2.4	19.8
2015^{†}	Minnesota	**10**	**10**	**36.1**	.419	.349	.868	**7.3**	2.6	2.3	1.1	2.8	**23.4**
2016	Minnesota	8	8	32.9	.517	.387	.935	**7.3**	4.6	1.8	0.5	2.7	22.4
2017^{†}	Minnesota	8	8	33.4	.515	**.542**	.730	5.3	3.0	1.8	0.4	1.9	18.3
2018	Minnesota	1	1	35.2	.400	.250	.200	4.0	3.0	2.0	0.0	2.0	14.0
Career	8 years, 1 team	56	56	33.2	.467	.399	.845	6.0	3.2	1.7	0.7	2.1	19.2

== Social justice activism ==
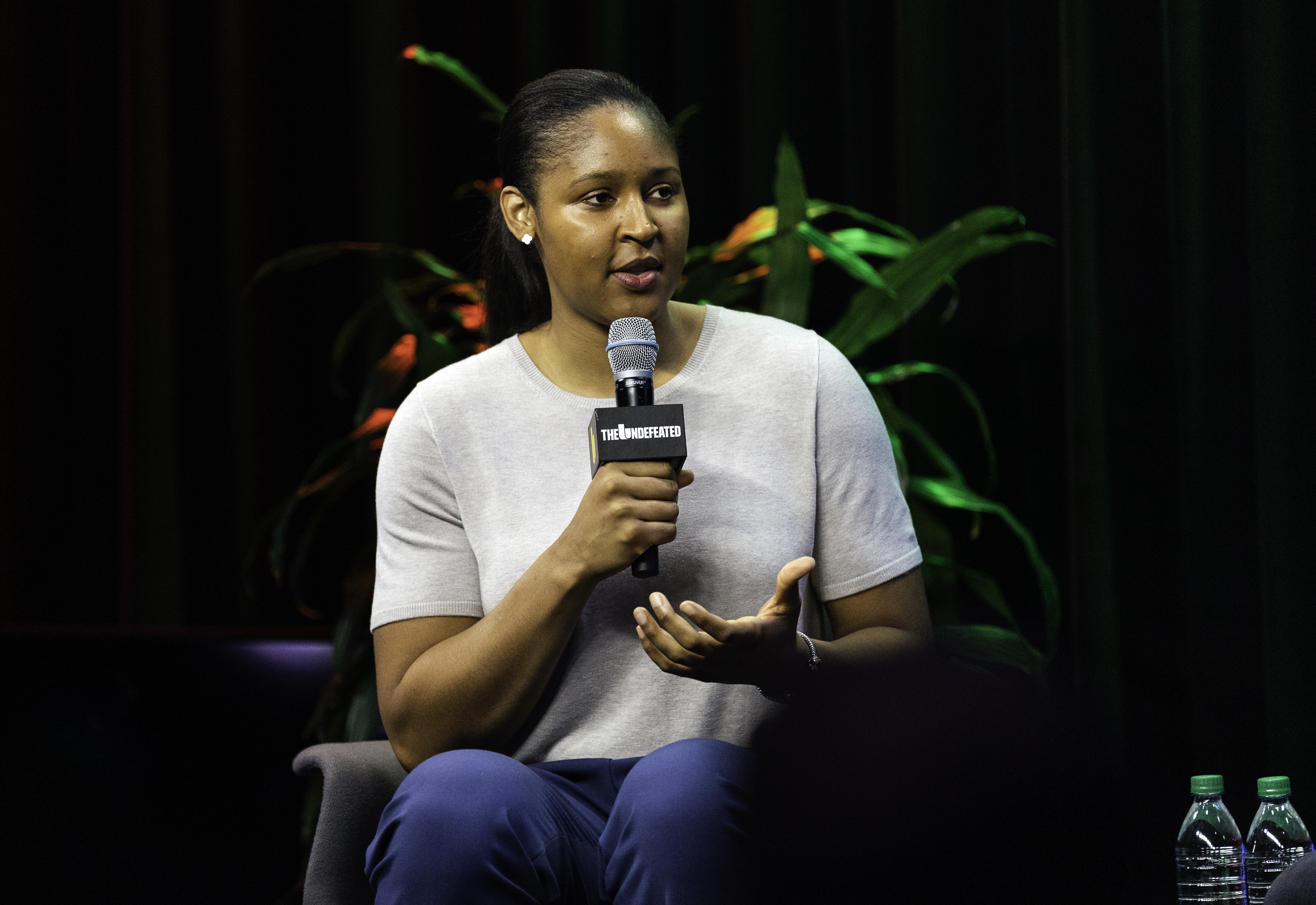
Moore speaking before at The Marshall Project in Washington, D.C. in 2019.

On July 9, 2016, Moore spoke along with co-captain Rebekkah Brunson at a news conference about the warm up shirts the Minnesota Lynx wore that day to highlight Black Lives Matter and call for change. The black shirts said "Change starts with us - Justice and Accountability" on the front; the back of the shirts had the names of Philando Castile and Alton Sterling, who had been killed in confrontations with police that week. The shirts also included the Dallas police shield to recognize the recent mass shooting in that Texas city where five police officers were killed following a Black Lives Matter demonstration. The Lynx shirts and news conference were an early Black Lives Matter protest among athletes.

In 2017, Moore started Win with Justice to advocate for prosecutorial reform. Writers Chris Herring and Neil Paine recounted her amazing basketball record through her departure from basketball in 2019 and noted that "Moore is special because she could have gone about her business as one of the best players in WNBA history, but instead she chose to lend her voice and platform to victims of injustice." They noted her place as one of the top civil rights voices among athletes. In July 2021, ESPN Films released Breakaway about Moore and her social justice advocacy as part of their 30 for 30 series. Robin Roberts was the executive producer of the film. Moore won the Arthur Ashe Award for Courage in 2021 for her work on criminal justice reform.

Moore is also an advocate for the End It movement, which seeks to end modern slavery.

Moore was also involved in freeing her now-husband, Jonathan Irons, from prison. Wrongfully convicted, Irons served 22 years of a 50-year conviction before being freed at age 40.

== Personal life ==
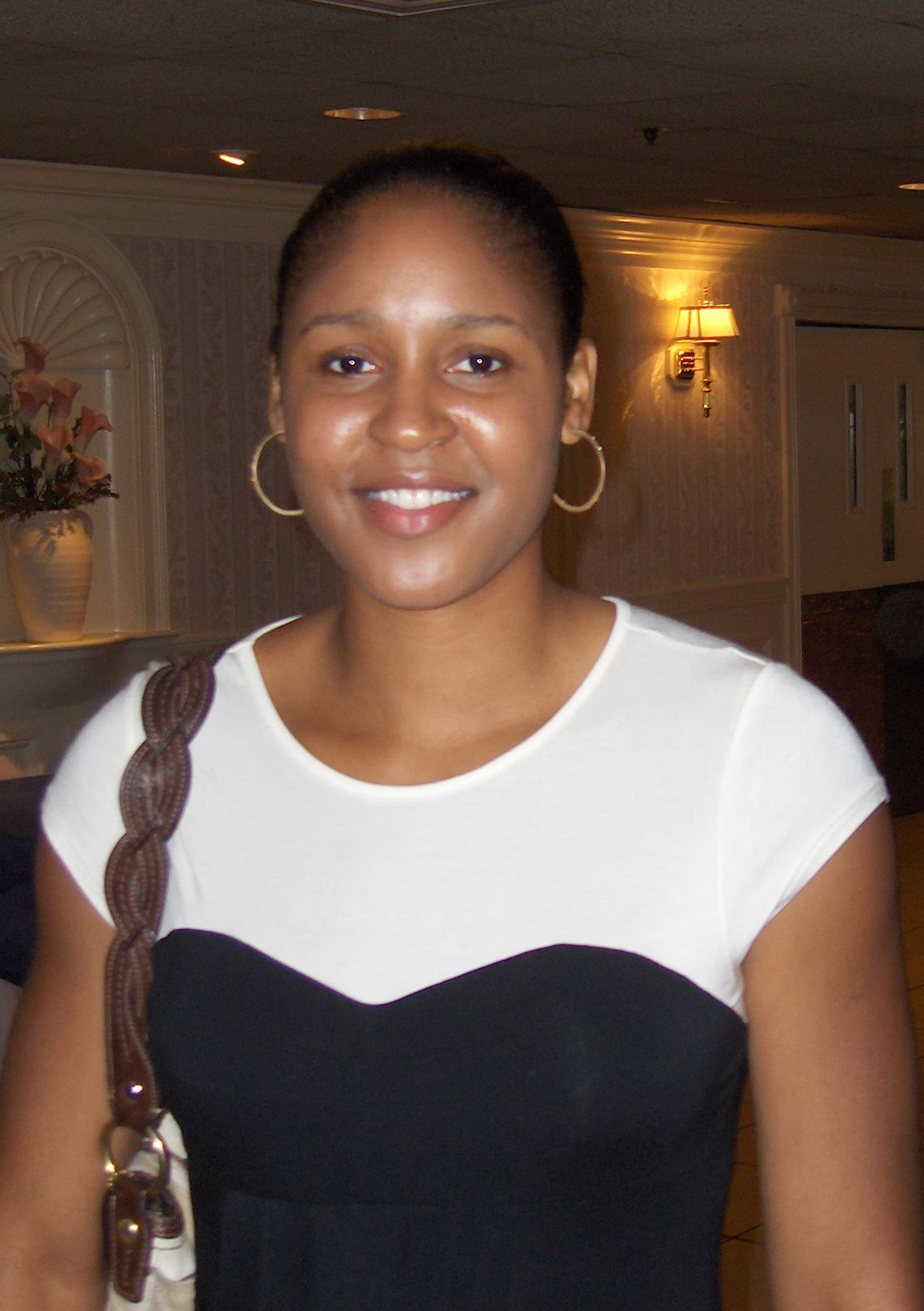
Moore in 2009.

Moore is a Christian. Moore has spoken about her faith, saying "Even though I've got a lot of awards and honors, it's nothing compared to what The Lord has done to my heart and what He's done for the world" and "I'm grateful to have the platform of an elite student-athlete and professional basketball player, and I want to do His will with my life."

Influenced by her godparents, Moore advocates for prosecutorial reform in the American justice system. Specifically, she pressed for the release of Jonathan Irons from the Jefferson City Correctional Center. Irons was serving a 50-year sentence begun when he was 16 years old. Moore took a sabbatical from basketball in 2019 and 2020, hoping to secure his release. Irons was released July 1, 2020. In September 2020, Moore told Good Morning America that she and Irons had gotten married "a couple of months ago". On July 5, 2022, Moore announced the birth of their first child, a son named Jonathan Irons Jr. In 2023, the two published a book, Love and Justice: A Story of Triumph on Two Different Courts.

Moore was the subject of an ESPN Sports Science video clip, discussing her vertical leap, court vision, and muscle memory. They discussed her ability to steal, noting that she can move her hands faster than the striking speed of a rattlesnake.

On October 28, 2013, Moore was featured as Betty Lou in the Pepsi Max series of advertisements written and directed by Kyrie Irving, becoming the first WNBA player to be a part of the series. In the "Uncle Drew: Chapter 3" spot, Betty Lou, 'Lights' (Nate Robinson), and 'Uncle Drew' (Irving) hustle a courtyard of young players at Seward Park in Chicago, Illinois.

Moore was named to Forbes' 30 Under 30: The Sports World's Brightest Young Stars for 2015.

In November 2016, Moore joined the UNICEF Kid Power philanthropic initiative, participating as one of the UNICEF Kid Power Champions; Moore joined a mission to Haiti that year.

Moore's father, Mike Dabney, who was not part of her life growing up, played collegiate basketball for the Rutgers Scarlet Knights men's basketball team that reached the Final Four at the 1976 NCAA Division I basketball tournament. He was chosen 36th overall by the Los Angeles Lakers in the third round of the 1976 NBA draft, though he did not play in the NBA. Through her father, Moore has a half-sister, Ashley Dabney, who was a college senior and track and field athlete at Maryland's Towson University in 2012. Also through her father, Moore has a ten-years younger half-sister, Olivia Dabney, who was a high school basketball player and All-Sophomore/Freshman First Team selection at New Jersey's Rutgers Preparatory School, and went on to play four years with the Division I Sacred Heart Pioneers.

== Awards and honors ==
- She was named to the U.S. U-18 National Team in 2006, and helped that team qualify for the 2007 U19 World Championships in Bratislava, Slovakia.
- In 2008, she became the first freshman in Big East Basketball history (men or women) to be named as the Big East Player of the Year.
- Through Moore's two seasons at UConn, Moore had only three games where she did not reach double digits. Those games are a 7-point performance vs. Pittsburgh on March 10, 2008, 7 points vs. Rutgers on April 1, 2008, and 8 points vs. Villanova on February 24, 2009.
- Moore also broke the UConn single-season record for most points as a freshman (678) breaking the mark set by Svetlana Abrosimova, who had 538 in 1997–98.
- Scored her 1,000th career point on January 20, 2009 (in just her 55th game at UConn) at the XL Center in Hartford, Connecticut while scoring 40 points over the Syracuse Orange. The previous UConn record for the fewest games needed to reach 1,000 points was 63 by Svetlana Abrosimova.
- Maya Moore becomes UConn's all-time single-season scoring leader with 712 points, ends season with 754 points
- Moore finished the 2009–10 season with 736 points, the second most points scored in a season by a UConn player only to herself (754 pts in 2008–09). In addition, this brings her career total to 2,168 points, 178 short of the UConn record of 2,346 points held by her teammate Tina Charles.
- Moore was named the co-winner of the Honda-Broderick Cup (along with Megan Hodge from Penn State), awarded to the Collegiate Woman Athlete of the Year. The criteria include "outstanding athletic achievement but also team contributions, scholastics and community involvement".
- Moore won the 2010 ESPY Award for Best Female College Athlete.
- Moore was selected to play in a basketball game organized by President Barack Obama to entertain wounded troops. The players invited included some current and former stars: LeBron James, Dwyane Wade, Carmelo Anthony, Bill Russell and Magic Johnson.
- Moore scored a career-high 41 points while adding 10 rebounds, 3 assists, 1 steal, and 3 blocks in UConn's historic 89th consecutive victory on December 21, 2010, against 22/22 Florida State.
- In March 2011, Moore earned All-American honors, becoming the second four-time All-American women's basketball player.
- In April 2011, Moore was named Associated Press Player of the Year for the second time.

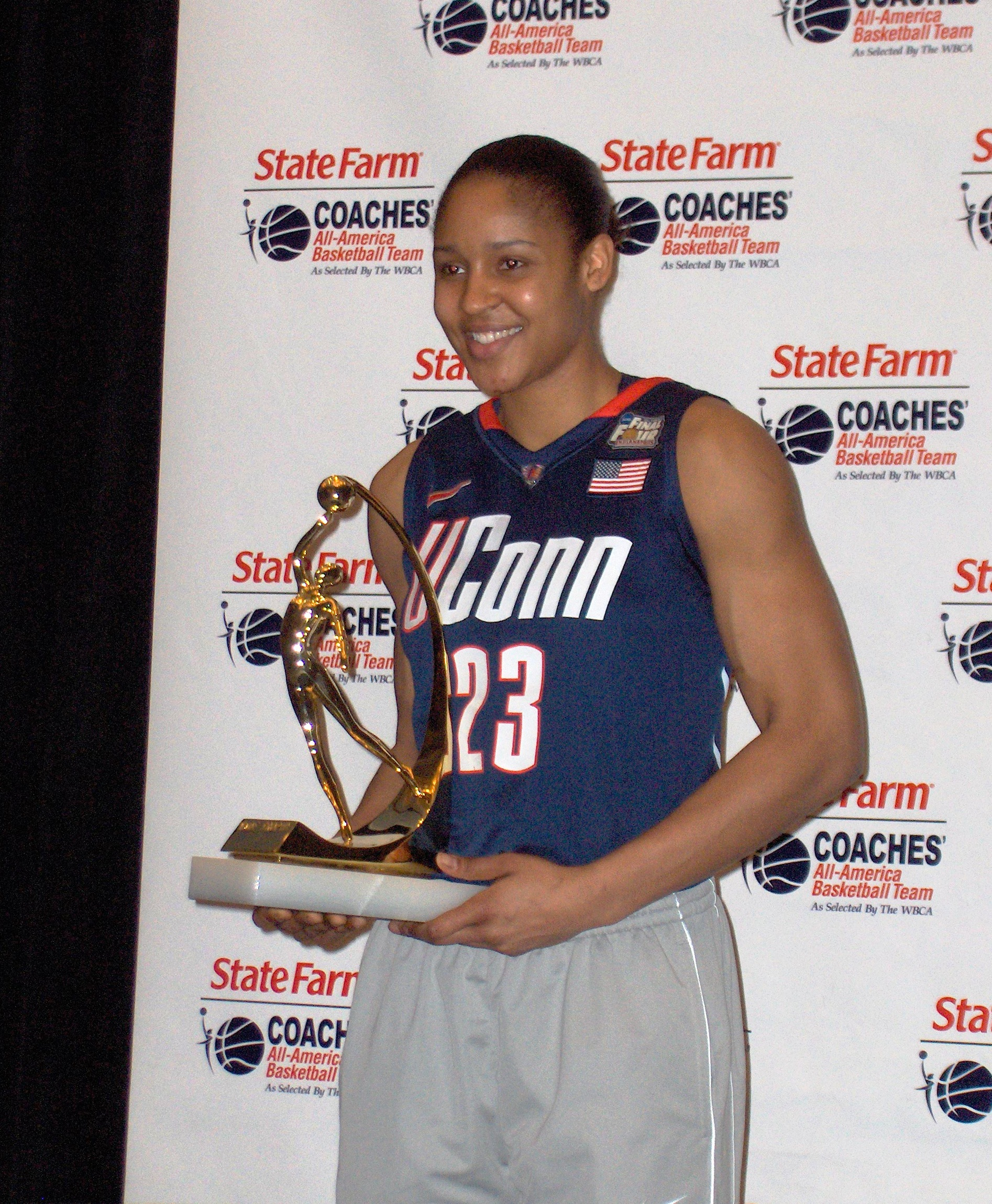
Maya Moore accepting the Wade trophy for the best NCAA Division I player in 2011

- Moore was selected Best Female Amateur Athlete by Connecticut Magazine for 2010
- Won a gold medal with Team USA in the London Olympics
- Over the course of her career, Moore has been invited to receive honors at the White House five times, prompting President Obama to joke that "basically, there's like a Maya Moore wing in the White House."

=== 2007 ===
- Naismith National Girls' High School Player of the Year
- WBCA High School Coaches' All-America Team
- WBCA High School Game MVP (Red team)

=== 2008 ===
- Big East Freshman of the Year
- Big East Player of the Year (first freshman – man or woman – to receive this award)
- USBWA National Freshman of the Year
- Unanimous (USBWA, WBCA, AP) All-America First Team

=== 2009 ===
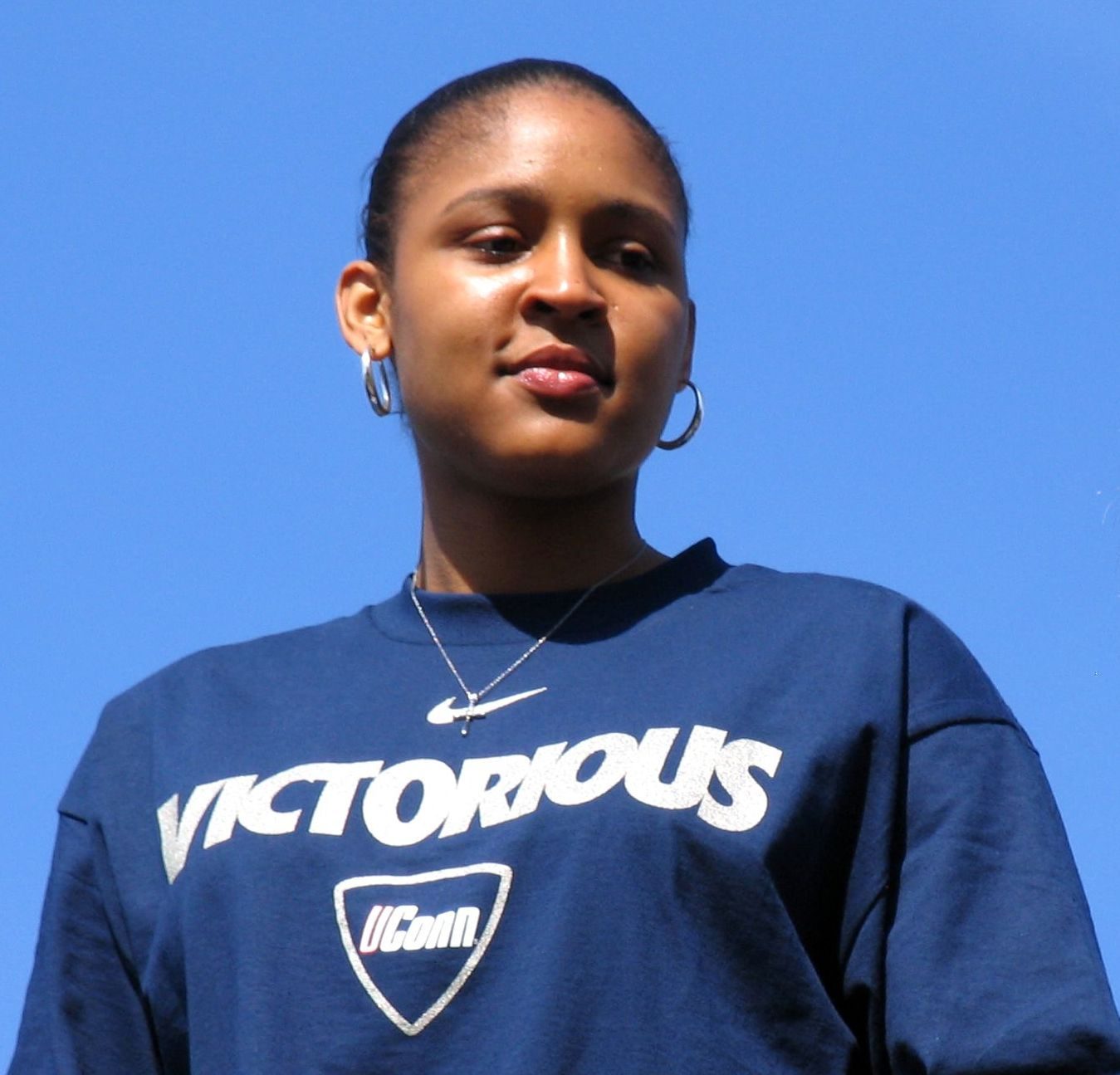
Maya Moore in Parade celebrating UConn undefeated National Championship

- Big East Player of the Year
- USBWA Women's National Player of the Year
- Associated Press Women's College Basketball Player of the Year
- Wade Trophy
- Naismith College Player of the Year
- John R. Wooden Award
- Unanimous (USBWA, WBCA, AP) All-America First Team
- CoSIDA Academic All-America First Team
- Women's NCAA Final Four All-Tournament Team
- ESPY for Best Female College Athlete

=== 2010 ===
- Wade Trophy
- Unanimous (USBWA, WBCA, AP) All-America First Team
- CoSIDA Academic All-America First Team
- Academic All-America of the Year award
- NCAA Final Four Most Outstanding Player
- Honda Sports Award, basketball
- Honda-Broderick Cup, co-winner
- ESPY for Best Female College Athlete
- Best Female Amateur Athlete by Connecticut Magazine

=== 2011 ===
- Wade Trophy
- Associated Press Women's College Basketball Player of the Year
- Naismith College Player of the Year
- John R. Wooden Award
- USBWA Women's National Player of the Year
- Lowe's Senior CLASS Award
- Honda Sports Award, basketball
- Elite 88 Award Division I women's basketball
- Big East Player of the Year
- Unanimous (USBWA, WBCA, AP) All-America First Team
- CoSIDA Academic All-America First Team
- Academic All-America of the Year award
- All-sports Academic All-America of the Year award
- Honda-Broderick Cup
- ESPY for Best Female College Athlete
- 2011 WNBA All-Star
- WNBA All-Rookie Team
- WNBA Rookie of the Year
- WNBA Champion

=== 2012 ===
- EuroLeague Women Champion
- Olympic Gold Medalist, Women's Basketball

=== 2013 ===
- WNBA Champion
- WCBA Champion
- 2013 WNBA All-Star
- 2013 WNBA Western Conference Player of the Month (2x)
- First Team All-WNBA
- WNBA Finals MVP

=== 2014 ===
- WNBA Western Conference Player of the Month for May 2014
- WCBA Champion
- ESPY for Best WNBA Player
- 2014 WNBA All-Star
- All-WNBA First Team
- WNBA Western Conference Player of the Month for July 2014
- WNBA MVP
- FIBA Gold Medalist, Women's Basketball
- MVP of FIBA World Championships for Women
- Named one of ESPNW's Impact 25.

=== 2015 ===
- WNBA Champion
- 2015 WNBA All-Star
- WNBA All-Star Game MVP
- All-WNBA First Team

=== 2016 ===
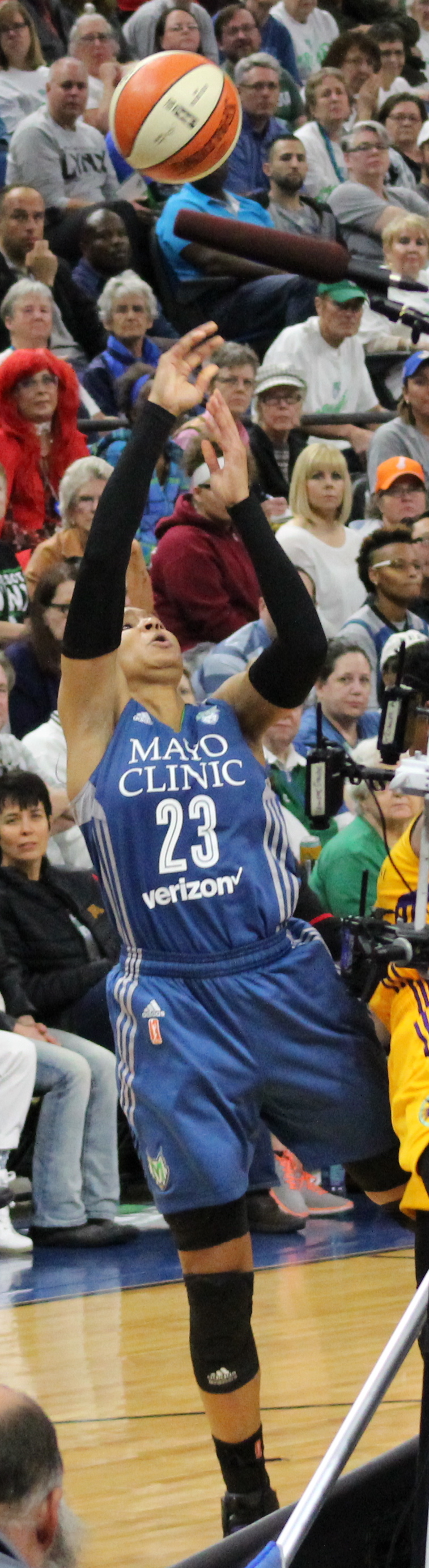
Moore at the 2016 WNBA Finals

- ESPY for Best WNBA Player
- All-WNBA First Team
- Olympic Gold Medalist
- All-WNBA First Team

=== 2017 ===
- WNBA Champion
- All-WNBA First Team
- WNBA All-Defensive Second Team
- Western Conference All-Star
- WNBA All-Star Game MVP

=== 2021 ===
- Arthur Ashe Courage Award

=== 2023 ===
- All-25 Team, Minnesota Lynx

=== 2024 ===
- Inducted into the Women's Basketball Hall of Fame
- Number 23 jersey retired by the Minnesota Lynx.

=== 2025 ===
- To be inducted into the Naismith Memorial Basketball Hall of Fame

== See also ==
- List of NCAA Division I women's basketball career scoring leaders
- List of NCAA Division I women's basketball players with 2,500 points and 1,000 rebounds
- List of Connecticut Huskies women's basketball players with 1000 points
- List of Connecticut Huskies women's basketball players with 1000 rebounds
- Connecticut Huskies women's basketball
- 2008–09 Connecticut Huskies women's basketball team
- 2009–10 Connecticut Huskies women's basketball team
