= Notre Dame Junior Senior High School (Utica, New York) =

Private, coeducational school in Utica, New York, United States

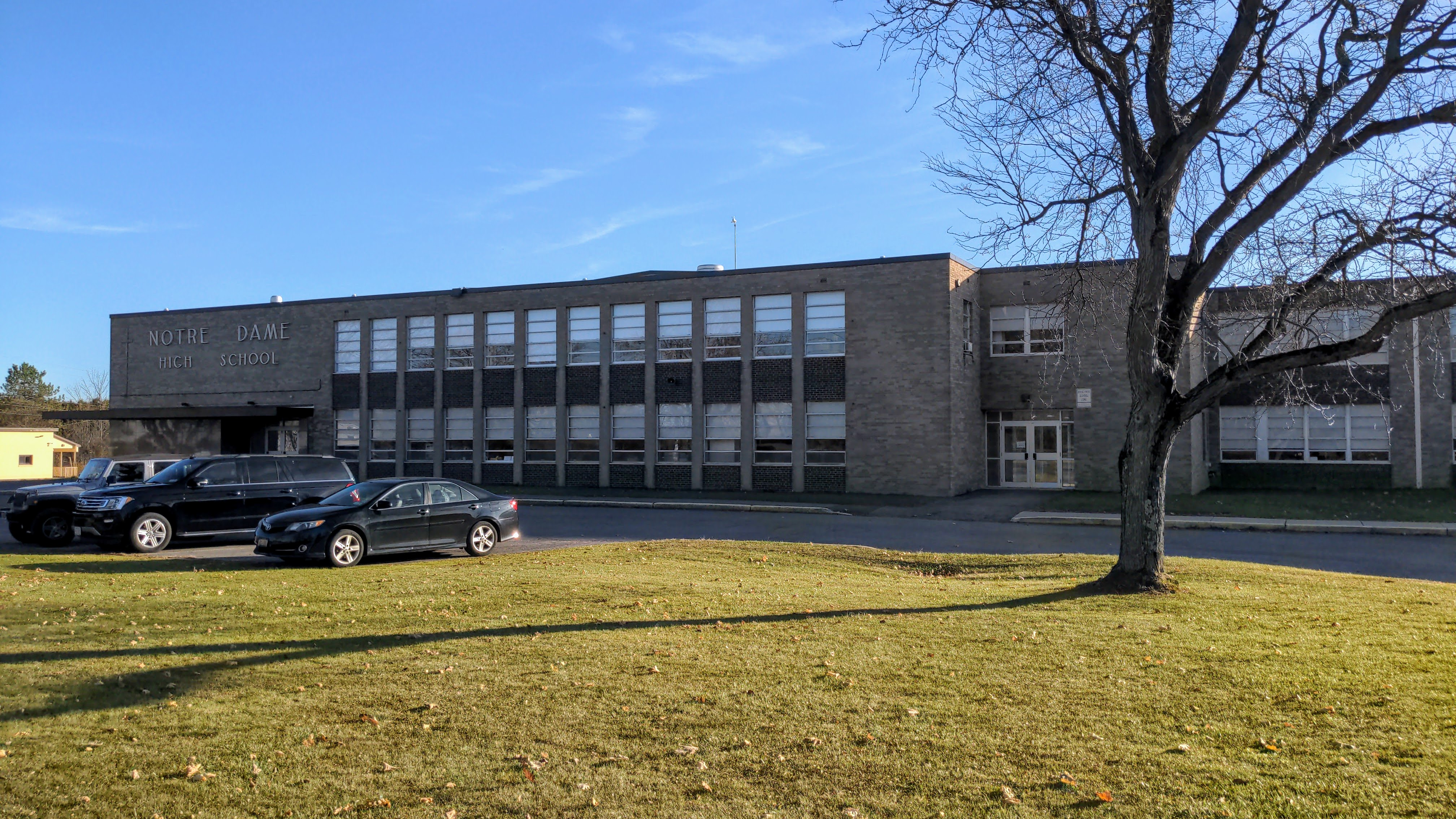
- Eastern end of school complex

Location
- 2 Notre Dame Lane; Utica, (Oneida County), New York 13502; United States
- Coordinates: 43°5′37″N 75°16′55″W

Information
- Type: Private, Coeducational
- Religious affiliation: Roman Catholic
- Established: 1959
- Superintendent: William Crist
- Chairperson: Elizabeth Kearns
- Principal: Richard Hensel
- Grades: 6-12
- Colors: Navy blue and old gold
- Athletics conference: Tri-Valley League
- Mascot: Juggler
- Website: Official website

Notre Dame Junior Senior High School (NDJSHS) is a co-ed Catholic high school in Utica, New York. It is part of the Roman Catholic Diocese of Syracuse.

Notre Dame was established in 1959 by the Xaverian Brothers. The land that the school was built on was the former location of a military hospital. Initially, the school owned the land currently occupied by the Utica Business Park, but sold most of it to the city, creating its current boundaries. Originally just a high school, in 1994 both local Catholic junior high schools merged with Notre Dame and moved to the high school building.

The school hosts a Navy Junior Reserve Officers Training Corps Unit.

== Notable alumni ==
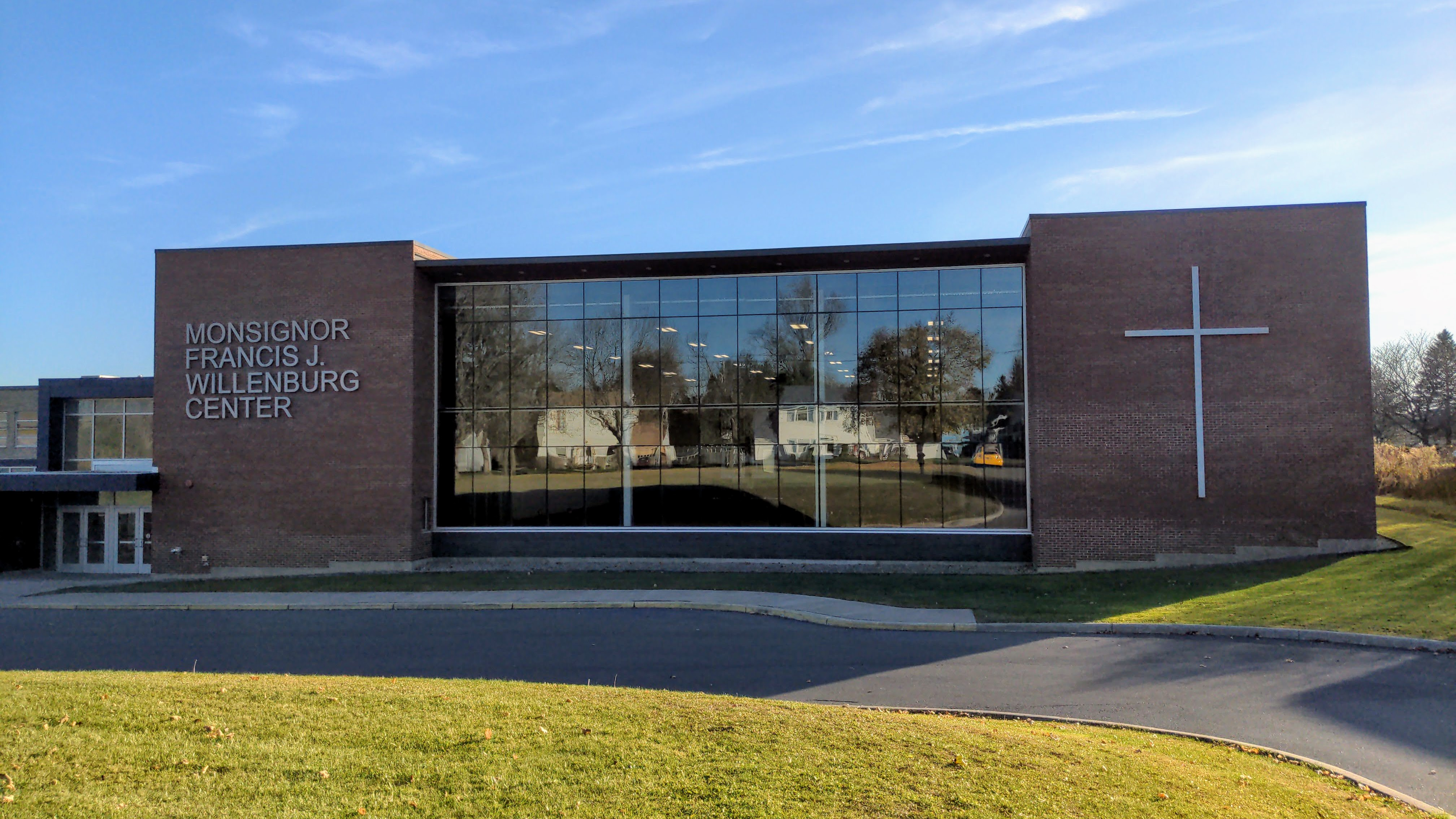
Gymnasium completed in 2017

- Kim Bass, film and television writer, director, and producer; co-creator of Sister, Sister
- Anthony Brindisi, lawyer and politician; U.S. representative from New York from 2019 to 2021
- Mark Lemke, former MLB player for the Atlanta Braves and 1995 World Series champion
- Shelly Pennefather, former professional basketball player for the Nippon Express in Japan
- Jim Wessinger, former MLB player for the Atlanta Braves
- John Zogby, opinion pollster, author, and public speaker; founder of Zogby International poll
