= Villanova Wildcats women's basketball =

Villanova Wildcats
2026–27 Villanova Wildcats women's basketball team
- University: Villanova University
- Head coach: Denise Dillon (7th season)
- Location: Villanova, Pennsylvania
- Arena: Finneran Pavilion (capacity: 6,500)
- Conference: Big East
- Nickname: Wildcats
- Colors: Navy blue and white
- Student section: Nova Nation

NCAA Division I tournament Elite Eight
- 2003
Other NCAA Division I tournament results
Sweet Sixteen	2003, 2023
Appearances	1982, 1986, 1987, 1988, 1989, 2001, 2002, 2003, 2004, 2009, 2013, 2018, 2022, 2023, 2026

AIAW tournament Final Four
- 1982
Other AIAW tournament results
Quarterfinals	1982
Second round	1982
Appearances	1982

Conference tournament champions
- 1986, 1987, 2003

Conference regular-season champions
- 1984, 1985, 1987

Uniforms
Home	Away

The Villanova Wildcats women's basketball team represents Villanova University in Villanova, Pennsylvania, United States.

== History ==
The school's team currently competes in the Big East, where it has competed since the 1982–83 season. The women's basketball team began competing in 1969–70 under coach Liz Cawley, obtaining a 4–6 record in its inaugural season, and an 8–5 record and its first winning season the following year.

Harry Perretta coached the team starting in 1978. In the fall of 2019 it was announced that Perretta's 2019–2020 season would be his last season coaching the Wildcats after a 42-year tenure with the program. He was honored at the team's last home game of the 2019–2020 season at Finneran Pavilion.

The Wildcats are currently coached by Denise Dillon.

On January 20, 2023, Maddy Siegrist became the Wildcats' all-time leading scorer, breaking Shelly Pennefather's record. She also led the nation in scoring in 2022–23 and earned Big East Player of the Year in two consecutive seasons.

== Year by year results ==
Record table
Season	Coach	Overall	Conference	Standing	Postseason
Liz Cawley (1969–1970)
1969–70	Liz Cawley	4–6			
Liz Cawley:		4–6 (.400)			
Jane Sefranek (1970–1975)
1970–71	Jane Sefranek	8–5			
1971–72	Jane Sefranek	9–3			
1972–73	Jane Sefranek	10–5			
1973–74	Jane Sefranek	10–4			
1974–75	Jane Sefranek	14–6			
Jane Sefranek:		51–23 (.689)			
Joan King (1975–1978)
1975–76	Joan King	7–7			
1976–77	Joan King	6–11			
1977–78	Joan King	15–7			
Joan King:		28–25 (.528)			
Harry Perretta (1978–1980)
1978–79	Harry Perretta	17–8			
1979–80	Harry Perretta	20–5			
1980–81	Harry Perretta	22–6			
1981–82	Harry Perretta	29–4			AIAW Final Four
Big East Conference (1982–2020)
1982–83	Harry Perretta	14–15	4–4	T-4th	
1983–84	Harry Perretta	22–7	6–2	T-1st	
1984–85	Harry Perretta	21–9	12–4	T-1st	
1985–86	Harry Perretta	23–8	12–4	T-2nd	NCAA second round
1986–87	Harry Perretta	27–4	15–1	1st	NCAA First round
1987–88	Harry Perretta	20–9	11–5	2nd	NCAA First round
1988–89	Harry Perretta	18–12	11–5	2nd	NCAA First round
1989–90	Harry Perretta	9–19	1–15	9th	
1990–91	Harry Perretta	12–17	4–12	8th	
1991–92	Harry Perretta	11–17	7–11	T-3rd	
1992–93	Harry Perretta	15–13	10–8	T-4th	
1993–94	Harry Perretta	13–14	7–11	T-6th	
1994–95	Harry Perretta	19–9	13–5	2nd	
1995–96	Harry Perretta	21–7	13–5	3rd (3rd BE6)	
1996–97	Harry Perretta	14–14	8–10	T-6th (5th BE6)	
1997–98	Harry Perretta	19–10	12–6	T-4th (T-2nd BE6)	WNIT 1st Round
1998–99	Harry Perretta	14–14	9–9	T-6th	
1999–00	Harry Perretta	15–15	7–9	T-6th	WNIT 1st Round
2000–01	Harry Perretta	22–9	11–5	T-4th	NCAA second round
2001–02	Harry Perretta	20–11	12–4	T-3rd	NCAA second round
2002–03	Harry Perretta	28–6	12–4	T-3rd	NCAA Elite Eight
2003–04	Harry Perretta	23–7	12–4	T-2nd	NCAA second round
2004–05	Harry Perretta	19–12	10–6	T-4th	WNIT 1st Round
2005–06	Harry Perretta	21–11	9–7	T-6th	WNIT Quarterfinals
2006–07	Harry Perretta	8–21	2–14	16th	
2007–08	Harry Perretta	17–16	5–11	T-11th	WNIT Round of 16
2008–09	Harry Perretta	19–14	12–4	T-4th	NCAA First round
2009–10	Harry Perretta	14–16	3–13	15th	
2010–11	Harry Perretta	12–19	3–13	T-13th	
2011–12	Harry Perretta	19–15	6–10	T-10th	WNIT Round of 16
2012–13	Harry Perretta	21–11	9–7	T-6th	NCAA First round
2013–14	Harry Perretta	23–9	12–6	T-3rd	WNIT 2nd Round
2014–15	Harry Perretta	22–14	12–6	3rd	WNIT Round of 16
2015–16	Harry Perretta	20–12	12–6	T-2nd	WNIT 2nd Round
2016–17	Harry Perretta	20–15	11–7	4th	WNIT semifinals
2017–18	Harry Perretta	23–9	12–6	3rd	NCAA round of 32
2018–19	Harry Perretta	19–13	9–9	4th	WNIT 2nd Round
2019-20	Harry Perretta	18-13	11-7	T-3rd	N/A
Harry Perretta:		742–467 (.614)	322–264 (.549)		
Denise Dillon (Big East) (2020–Present)
2020-21	Denise Dillon	17-7	9–5	5th	WNIT Quarterfinals
2021-22	Denise Dillon	24-9	15-4	2nd	NCAA Second Round
2022-23	Denise Dillon	30-7	17-3	2nd	NCAA Sweet Sixteen
2023-24	Denise Dillon	22-13	11-7	T-3rd	WBIT Runner-Up
2024-25	Denise Dillon	21-15	11-7	5th	WBIT Semifinals
Denise Dillon:		114-51	63-26		
Total:		898–556 (.618)			
National champion Postseason invitational champion Conference regular season champion Conference regular season and conference tournament champion Division regular season champion Division regular season and conference tournament champion Conference tournament champion

== Postseason results ==
=== NCAA Division I ===
Villanova has appeared in the NCAA Division I women's basketball tournament fifteen times. They have a record of 11–15.

Year	Seed	Round	Opponent	Result
1986	#7	First Round; Second Round	#10 La Salle #2 Rutgers	W 60–55; L 58–85
1987	#6	Second Round	#3 NC State	L 67–68
1988	#8	First Round	#9 Wake Forest	L 51–53
1989	#11	First Round	#6 Old Dominion	L 41–66
2001	#5	First Round; Second Round	#12 Drake #4 NC State	W 66–58; L 64–68
2002	#9	First Round; Second Round	#8 Pepperdine #1 Oklahoma	W 67–46; L 53–66
2003	#2	First Round; Second Round; Sweet Sixteen; Elite Eight	#15 St. Francis (PA) #7 George Washington #6 Colorado #1 Tennessee	W 51–36; W 70–57; W 53–51; L 49–73
2004	#7	First Round; Second Round	#10 Ole Miss #2 Purdue	W 66–63; L 42–60
2009	#8	First Round	#9 Utah	L 30–60
2013	#9	First Round	#8 Michigan	L 52–60
2018	#9	First Round; Second Round	#8 South Dakota State #1 Notre Dame	W 81–74 (OT); L 72–98
2022	#11	First Round; Second Round	#6 Brigham Young #3 Michigan	W 61–57; L 49-64
2023	#4	First Round; Second Round; Sweet Sixteen	#13 Cleveland State #12 Florida Gulf Coast #9 Miami (FL)	W 76–59; W 76-57; L 65-70
2026	#10	First Round	#7 Texas Tech	L 52–57

=== AIAW Division I ===
The Wildcats made one appearance in the AIAW National Division I basketball tournament, with a combined record of 2–1.

Year	Round	Opponent	Result
1982	First Round; Quarterfinals; Semifinals	Miami (OH); Delta State; Rutgers	W, 69–61; W, 87–72; L, 75–83

== Roster ==
2026–27 Villanova Wildcats women's basketball team
Players
Coaches

Pos.	#	Name	Height	Year	Previous school	Hometown
G	2	Simone Pelish	6 ft 0 in (1.83 m)	So	Miami (FL)	Poughkeepsie, NY
G	11	Jasmine Bascoe	5 ft 7 in (1.7 m)	Jr	King's Christian Collegiate	Milton, Ontario
F	12	Elise Bender	6 ft 1 in (1.85 m)	RS Fr	Anthony Wayne	Whitehouse, OH
F	13	Brynn McCurry	6 ft 1 in (1.85 m)	Sr	Sparta	Sparta, NJ
F	14	Brooke Bender	6 ft 1 in (1.85 m)	So	Anthony Wayne	Whitehouse, OH
F	21	Janet Oriakhi	6 ft 0 in (1.83 m)	Fr	BORG Monsberger	Graz, Austria
G	22	Kennedy Henry	6 ft 0 in (1.83 m)	So	Westtown School	Hockessin, DE
G	23	Kelsey Joens	5 ft 10 in (1.78 m)	Sr	Iowa State	Iowa City, IA
G	24	Dani Ceseretti	6 ft 0 in (1.83 m)	Jr	Northfield Mount Hermon	Barrington, RI
F	33	Anna Foley	6 ft 3 in (1.91 m)	Sr	Quinnipiac	Andover, MA
G	34	Alexis Eberz	5 ft 10 in (1.78 m)	Fr	Archbishop John Carroll	Havertown, PA
F	45	Rachel Wirts	6 ft 3 in (1.91 m)	Jr	Center Grove	Greenwood, IN
G	52	Miky Panait	5 ft 7 in (1.7 m)	So	Spiru Haret	Bucharest, Romania

Head coach

- Denise Dillon (Villanova)

Assistant coach(es)

- Joe Mullaney (Providence)
- Michelle Sword (Saint Joseph's)
- Tiara Malcom (Delaware)
- Jess Genco (Northeastern)
- Latifah Coleman (North Carolina)

Legend

- (C) Team captain
- (S) Suspended
- (I) Ineligible
- (W) Walk-on
- Injured
- Current redshirt

Roster
Last update: September 16, 2026
