= Shelly Pennefather =

American basketball player

Personal information
- Born: c. 1966
- Listed height: 6 ft 1 in (1.85 m)

Career information
- High school: Bishop Machebeuf (Denver, Colorado); Notre Dame (Utica, New York)
- College: Villanova (1983–1987)
- Position: Forward

Career history
- 1987–1990: Nippon Express

Career highlights
- Wade Trophy (1987); Kodak All-American (1987); 3× Big East Player of the Year (1985–1987); 2× Big East Tournament MVP (1986, 1987); Big East Freshman of the Year (1984)
Medals
Representing United States
Women's basketball
Jones Cup
Silver medal – second place	1982 Taipei, Taiwan	Team competition

Mary Michelle Pennefather (born c. 1966), now known as Sister Rose Marie of the Queen of Angels, is a former professional basketball player. Winner of the Wade Trophy in 1987, she went on to play premier league basketball in Japan before retiring to a monastic life.

== Personal life ==
Shelly Pennefather is the daughter of Mike and Mary Jane Pennefather. Mike Pennefather was an Air Force Colonel so the family moved to many locations, like Germany, Hawaii, and New York. Shelly was one of six children.

== High school ==
Pennefather spent three years at Bishop Machebeuf Catholic High School in Denver, Colorado and one at Notre Dame High School in Utica, New York. She led Machebeuf to three consecutive state championships and a 70–0 record. She led Notre Dame to a 26–0 record, also winning the state championship making for a no loss record for her entire high school career.

Pennefather was named to the Parade All-American High School Basketball Team. She was a U.S. Olympic Festival selection in 1981 and 1983. She turned out for the USA Women's R. William Jones Cup Team in 1982 where she earned a silver medal.

== College ==
Pennefather played college basketball for the Villanova Wildcats at Villanova University in Radnor Township, Pennsylvania. She was convinced to attend by Coach Harry Perretta, who connected with her through their devotion.

She was the school's all-time leading scorer for both women and men with a career total of 2,408 points. She was the Big East Player of The Year three times. She was a First Team All-American selection in 1987, and the winner of the coveted Wade Trophy.

=== Villanova statistics ===
Legend
GP	Games played	GS	Games started	MPG	Minutes per game
FG%	Field goal percentage	3P%	3-point field goal percentage	FT%	Free throw percentage
RPG	Rebounds per game	APG	Assists per game	SPG	Steals per game
BPG	Blocks per game	PPG	Points per game	**Bold**	Career high

Year	Team	GP	Points	FG%	FT%	RPG	APG	SPG	BPG	PPG
1984	Villanova	26	504	53.5%	78.0%	9.7	NA	NA	NA	19.4
1985	Villanova	29	544	53.4%	74.0%	**10.9**	4.3	2.2	**1.5**	18.8
1986	Villanova	**31**	**685**	57.3%	**81.8%**	9.5	**5.1**	2.3	0.9	**22.1**
1987	Villanova	**31**	675	**58.5%**	76.8%	9.9	4.3	**2.4**	1.1	21.8
Career		117	2408	55.9%	78.0%	10.0	3.6	1.8	0.9	20.6

== Professional career ==
After graduating from Villanova, Pennefather played three seasons of professional basketball for the Nippon Express in Japan. During this time, she would fly back to the United States every offseason and work for a month with the Missionaries of Charity, Mother Theresa's order of nuns.

== Religious life ==
On June 8, 1991, Pennefather retired to a monastic life with the Poor Clares order at their monastery in Alexandria, Virginia. On June 6, 1997, six years after entering the monastery as a novice, Pennefather, now known as Sister Rose Marie, took her final vows as a nun.

Pennefather will never leave the monastery except for a medical emergency. She gets two family visits a year, but they are only able to talk through a screen. On June 9, 2019, she celebrated the 25-year anniversary of her profession with a renewal of her vows. At this celebration she was able to hug her family. Her next opportunity to do so will not happen for another 25 years, per the rule of her religious order.
