= 2011 Tulsa Shock season =

14th season for Tulsa Shock franchise

- Head coach: Nolan Richardson (1–10); Teresa Edwards (2–21)
- Arena: BOK Center

Results
- Record: 3–31 (.088)
- Place: 6th (Western)
- Playoff finish: Did not qualify

Media
- Television: COX; ESPN2, NBATV

The 2011 WNBA season was the 14th season for the Tulsa Shock franchise of the Women's National Basketball Association. It is their 2nd in Tulsa. The Shock finished the season with a league record for lowest winning percentage (.088).

== Transactions ==
=== WNBA draft ===
The following are the Shock's selections in the 2011 WNBA draft.

Round	Pick	Player	Nationality	School/team/country
1	2	Elizabeth Cambage	Australia	Australia
1	7 (from Pho.)	Kayla Pedersen	United States	Stanford
2	21 (from Ind.)	Italee Lucas	United States	North Carolina
3	25	Chastity Reed	United States	Arkansas-Little Rock

=== Transaction log ===
- February 1: The Shock traded a second-round pick in the 2012 draft to the Los Angeles Sparks in exchange for Andrea Riley.
- February 16: The Shock re-signed Marion Jones.
- February 25: The Shock signed Juanita Ward.
- March 28: The Shock signed Sheryl Swoopes.
- April 8: The Shock signed Miranda Ayim to a training camp contract.
- April 30: The Shock signed Darxia Morris to a training camp contract.
- May 2: The Shock traded Scholanda Robinson to the San Antonio Silver Stars in exchange for second- and third-round picks in the 2012 draft.
- May 3: The Shock signed Betty Lennox.
- May 12: The Shock announced Nicole Ohlde's retirement.
- May 25: The Shock waived Italee Lucas and Juanita Ward.
- June 1: The Shock waived Betty Lennox, Darxia Morris and Rashanda McCants.
- June 15: The Shock waived Miranda Ayim.
- June 16: The Shock signed Jacinta Monroe.
- June 28: The Shock waived Jacinta Monroe.
- July 4: The Shock signed Doneeka Lewis.
- July 9: The Shock announced that Nolan Richardson resigned from head coach and general manager duties. Assistant coach Teresa Edwards was named interim head coach.
- July 15: The Shock signed Betty Lennox and waived Chastity Reed.
- July 21: The Shock signed Abi Olajuwon and waived Marion Jones.
- July 22: The Shock signed Karima Christmas and waived Doneeka Lewis.

=== Trades ===
Date	Trade	
February 1, 2011	To Tulsa Shock	To Los Angeles Sparks
February 1, 2011	Andrea Riley	second-round pick in 2012 draft
May 2, 2011	To Tulsa Shock	To San Antonio Silver Stars
May 2, 2011	second- and third-round picks in 2012 draft	Scholanda Robinson

=== Personnel changes ===
==== Additions ====
Player	Signed	Former team
Andrea Riley	February 1, 2011	Los Angeles Sparks
Sheryl Swoopes	March 28, 2011	free agent
Miranda Ayim	April 8, 2011	free agent
Liz Cambage	April 11, 2011	draft pick
Kayla Pedersen	April 11, 2011	draft pick
Chastity Reed	April 11, 2011	draft pick
Betty Lennox	July 15, 2011	free agent
Abi Olajuwon	July 21, 2011	free agent
Karima Christmas	July 22, 2011	free agent

==== Subtractions ====
Player	Left	New team
Kiesha Brown	2011	free agent
Shanna Crossley	2011	knee injury
Scholanda Robinson	May 2, 2011	San Antonio Silver Stars
Nicole Ohlde	May 12, 2011	retired
Chante Black	May 16, 2011	back problems
Rashanda McCants	June 1, 2011	free agent
Miranda Ayim	June 15, 2011	free agent
Chastity Reed	July 15, 2011	free agent
Marion Jones	July 21, 2011	free agent

== Roster ==
2011 Tulsa Shock roster
Players
Coaches

Pos.	No.	Nat.	Name	Height	Weight	DOB	From	Yrs
C	8	(Australia)	Cambage, Liz	6' 8" (2.03m)	215 lb (98kg)	1991-02-18	Australia	R
G/F	13	(United States)	Christmas, Karima	6' 0" (1.83m)		1989-09-11	Duke	R
G/F	4	(United States)	Holt, Amber	6' 0" (1.83m)	170 lb (77kg)	1985-06-07	Middle Tennessee	3
PF	33	(United States)	Jackson, Tiffany	6' 3" (1.91m)	185 lb (84kg)	1985-04-26	Texas	4
F	21	(United States)	Lacy, Jennifer	6' 3" (1.91m)	175 lb (79kg)	1983-03-21	Pepperdine	5
G	12	(United States)	Latta, Ivory	5' 6" (1.68m)	143 lb (65kg)	1984-09-25	North Carolina	4
G	7	(United States)	Lennox, Betty	5' 8" (1.73m)	143 lb (65kg)	1976-12-04	Louisiana Tech	11
C	34	(United States)	Olajuwon, Abi	6' 4" (1.93m)	236 lb (107kg)	1988-07-06	Oklahoma	1
F	14	(United States)	Pedersen, Kayla	6' 4" (1.93m)	190 lb (86kg)	1989-04-14	Stanford	R
G	10	(United States)	Riley, Andrea	5' 5" (1.65m)	136 lb (62kg)	1988-07-22	Oklahoma State	1
G/F	22	(United States)	Swoopes, Sheryl	6' 0" (1.83m)	145 lb (66kg)	1971-03-25	Texas Tech	11

Head coach
(United States) Teresa Edwards (Georgia)
Assistant coaches
(United States) Kathy McConnell-Miller (Virginia)
(United States) Tracy Murray (UCLA)
Athletic trainer
(United States) Allison Russell

Legend

- (C) Team captain
- (DP) Unsigned draft pick
- (FA) Free agent
- (S) Suspended
- Injured

=== Depth ===
Pos.	Starter	Bench
C	Tiffany Jackson	Liz Cambage; Abi Olajuwon
PF	Kayla Pedersen	Jennifer Lacy
SF	Sheryl Swoopes	Karima Christmas
SG	Amber Holt	Betty Lennox
PG	Ivory Latta	Andrea Riley

== Season standings ==
Western Conference	W	L	PCT	GB	Home	Road	Conf.
Minnesota Lynx ^{x}	27	7	.794	–	14–3	13–4	18–4
Seattle Storm ^{x}	21	13	.618	6.0	15–2	6–11	15–7
Phoenix Mercury ^{x}	19	15	.559	8.0	11–6	8–9	11–11
San Antonio Silver Stars ^{x}	18	16	.529	9.0	9–8	9–8	11–11
Los Angeles Sparks ^{o}	15	19	.441	12.0	10–7	5–12	10–12
Tulsa Shock ^{o}	3	31	.088	24.0	2–15	1–16	1–21

== Schedule ==
=== Preseason ===
2011 Game Log: Preseason

Game	Date	Time (ET)	Opponent	Score	High points	High rebounds	High assists	Location/Attendance	Record
1	May 29	5:00pm	@ Seattle	70-76	Holt (25)	Cambage, Jackson (8)	4 players (2)	KeyArena; 4,979	0-1

=== Regular season ===
2011 Game Log: Regular Season
June

Game	Date	Time (ET)	Opponent	TV	Score	High points	High rebounds	High assists	Location/Attendance	Record
1	June 4	8:00pm	@ San Antonio	COX	73-93	Cambage (18)	Cambage (10)	Jackson (4)	AT&T Center; 12,406	0-1
2	June 7	8:00pm	@ Minnesota		65-75	Cambage (16)	Cambage (15)	Jackson (3)	Target Center; 7,713	0-2
3	June 10	8:00pm	San Antonio		62-93	Cambage; Pedersen (12)	Pedersen (7)	Swoopes (4)	BOK Center; 7,509	0-3
4	June 12	3:00pm	@ Connecticut		79-90	Latta (26)	Pedersen (8)	Pedersen (5)	Mohegan Sun Arena; 6,520	0-4
5	June 14	7:00pm	@ Indiana	ESPN2	74-82	Latta (19)	Jackson (11)	Latta (5)	Conseco Fieldhouse; 6,024	0-5
6	June 18	8:00pm	Washington		77-59	Latta (22)	Jackson (9)	Pedersen (7)	BOK Center; 4,423	1-5
7	June 21	8:00pm	Seattle		77-82	Jackson (20)	Jackson (10)	Pedersen (4)	BOK Center; 4,612	1-6
8	June 23	12:30pm	New York		82-94	Cambage (22)	Jackson (6)	Latta (7)	BOK Center; 4,682	1-7
9	June 26	4:00pm	@ Washington	CSN-MA	63-83	Cambage (15)	Cambage (7)	Latta (5)	Verizon Center; 10,675	1-8
10	June 30	8:00pm	Minnesota		71-101	Latta (13)	Lacy (7)	Pedersen (5)	BOK Center; 3,970	1-9

July

Game	Date	Time (ET)	Opponent	TV	Score	High points	High rebounds	High assists	Location/Attendance	Record
11	July 8	8:00pm	Phoenix		78-86	Cambage (19)	Pedersen (9)	Lewis (9)	BOK Center; 4,081	1-10
12	July 10	6:00pm	@ Phoenix	NBATV; COX	63-102	Jackson (9)	Pedersen (7)	Riley (5)	US Airways Center; 7,696	1-11
13	July 13	12:30pm	@ Chicago		54-72	Lacy (13)	Jackson (11)	Jackson (5)	Allstate Arena; 13,838	1-12
14	July 15	8:00pm	Los Angeles		74-79	Riley (15)	Jackson (10)	Holt (5)	BOK Center; 5,034	1-13
15	July 17	4:00pm	@ New York	NBATV; MSG+	57-88	Jackson (17)	Jackson (11)	Holt (4)	Prudential Center; 6,735	1-14
All-Star break
16	July 26	8:00pm	Atlanta		68-76	Cambage (16)	Jackson (17)	Jackson; Latta; Swoopes (3)	BOK Center; 3,435	1-15
17	July 28	8:00pm	Chicago		55-64	Latta (20)	Jackson (15)	Holt (5)	BOK Center; 4,012	1-16
18	July 30	8:00pm	Seattle		72-89	Jackson (16)	Swoopes (8)	Lacy (5)	BOK Center; 5,067	1-17

August

Game	Date	Time (ET)	Opponent	TV	Score	High points	High rebounds	High assists	Location/Attendance	Record
19	August 5	8:00pm	Indiana		65-85	Jackson; Lacy (12)	Jackson (8)	Jackson (3)	BOK Center; 5,013	1-18
20	August 6	8:00pm	@ San Antonio		64-72	Jackson (27)	Jackson (10)	Cambage; Riley (3)	AT&T Center; 8,273	1-19
21	August 9	10:30pm	@ Los Angeles	PRIME	66-71	Jackson (18)	Holt (6)	Swoopes (4)	Staples Center; 8,255	1-20
22	August 11	10:00pm	@ Seattle		63-77	Cambage (24)	Cambage (10)	Swoopes (3)	KeyArena; 6,503	1-21
23	August 14	7:00pm	@ Minnesota	NBATV; COX; FS-N	54-82	Swoopes (9)	Cambage (5)	Swoopes (3)	Target Center; 8,388	1-22
24	August 21	7:00pm	Los Angeles		67-73	Swoopes (17)	Jackson (11)	Latta (6)	BOK Center; 6,012	1-23
25	August 23	8:00pm	Minnesota		72-78	Holt (18)	Jackson (10)	Latta (7)	BOK Center; 3,750	1-24
26	August 25	10:00pm	@ Seattle		57-74	Jackson; Swoopes (12)	Jackson (9)	Latta; Riley (3)	KeyArena; 6,887	1-25
27	August 26	10:30pm	@ Los Angeles	NBATV	77-75	Jackson (20)	Jackson (11)	Holt (7)	Staples Center; 8,997	2-25
28	August 28	4:00pm	Connecticut		83-72	Swoopes (22)	Jackson (12)	Latta (6)	BOK Center; 4,813	3-25
29	August 30	8:00pm	Phoenix		74-96	Cambage (16)	Pedersen (7)	Latta (6)	BOK Center; 3,590	3-26

September

Game	Date	Time (ET)	Opponent	TV	Score	High points	High rebounds	High assists	Location/Attendance	Record
30	September 2	8:00pm	Seattle		72-78	Lacy (18)	Jackson (10)	Swoopes (6)	BOK Center; 6,117	3-27
31	September 4	3:00pm	@ Atlanta	SSO	52-73	Jackson (15)	Jackson (11)	Swoopes (4)	Allstate Arena; 7,661	3-28
32	September 8	10:00pm	@ Phoenix	NBATV; COX	76-91	Cambage (22)	Jackson (10)	Riley (5)	US Airways Center; 8,189	3-29
33	September 9	10:30pm	@ Los Angeles	NBATV	73-84	Cambage; Riley (18)	Jackson (9)	Holt (5)	Staples Center; 10,299	3-30
34	September 11	7:00pm	San Antonio	NBATV; FS-SW	94-102 (OT)	Riley; Swoopes (20)	Jackson (9)	Holt (7)	BOK Center; 5,949	3-31

All games are viewable on WNBA LiveAccess or ESPN3.com

== Statistics ==
Legend
GP	Games played	GS	Games started	MPG	Minutes per game	RPG	Rebounds per game
APG	Assists per game	SPG	Steals per game	BPG	Blocks per game	PPG	Points per game
FG%	Field-goal percentage	3P%	3-point field-goal percentage	FT%	Free-throw percentage	TO	Turnovers per game
PF	Fouls per game		Team leader		League leader

=== Regular season ===
Player	GP	GS	MPG	FG%	3P%	FT%	RPG	APG	SPG	BPG	PPG
Miranda Ayim	3	0	14.0	.444	.000	.000	2.3	0.7	0.67	0.33	2.7
Liz Cambage	33	11	20.0	.511	.000	.794	4.7	0.5	0.85	0.88	11.5
Karima Christmas	17	0	9.8	.370	.235	.800	1.2	0.4	0.35	0.18	3.2
Amber Holt	26	24	25.6	.302	.214	.905	3.1	2.4	0.69	0.12	6.7
Tiffany Jackson	34	32	33.9	.456	.000	.776	8.4	2.0	1.18	0.62	12.4
Marion Jones	14	0	6.5	.190	.000	.500	0.4	0.2	0.50	0.14	0.7
Jennifer Lacy	34	18	19.2	.402	.350	.700	2.6	1.0	0.59	0.50	6.3
Ivory Latta	24	24	28.5	.414	.351	.830	2.0	3.2	1.21	0.08	12.2
Betty Lennox	9	0	6.1	.174	.235	.833	0.9	0.6	0.22	0.00	1.9
Doneeka Lewis	5	2	20.2	.279	.269	.000	2.2	2.8	0.80	0.20	6.2
Jacinta Monroe	4	0	5.3	.000	.000	.000	1.0	0.3	0.00	0.00	0.0
Abi Olajuwon	16	0	6.2	.269	.000	1.000	0.8	0.1	0.00	0.13	1.0
Kayla Pedersen	33	20	23.8	.402	.324	.796	3.6	1.8	1.06	0.36	6.8
Chastity Reed	11	1	13.2	.370	.000	.667	1.9	0.7	0.27	0.09	3.5
Andrea Riley	33	10	19.0	.314	.214	.855	1.2	1.8	0.97	0.09	6.0
Sheryl Swoopes	33	28	26.6	.398	.319	.870	4.1	2.3	0.76	0.27	8.2

== Awards and honors ==
- Liz Cambage was named to the 2011 WNBA All-Star Team as a reserve.
- Liz Cambage was named to the All-Rookie Team.
