= 2011 San Antonio Silver Stars season =

- Head coach: Dan Hughes
- Arena: AT&T Center

Results
- Record: 18–16 (.529)
- Place: 4th (Western)
- Playoff finish: Lost in Conference Semifinals

Media
- Television: FS-SW; ESPN2, NBATV

The 2011 WNBA season was the 15th season for the San Antonio Silver Stars franchise of the Women's National Basketball Association. It was their 9th in San Antonio.

== Transactions ==
=== WNBA draft ===
The following are the Silver Stars' selections in the 2011 WNBA draft.

Round	Pick	Player	Nationality	School/team/country
1	6	Danielle Robinson	United States	Oklahoma
2	20 (from Atl.)	Danielle Adams	United States	Texas A&M
3	30	Porsha Phillips	United States	Georgia

=== Transaction log ===
- February 2: The Silver Stars signed Shanavia Dowdell and Ashley Walker.
- March 7: The Silver Stars signed Tully Bevilaqua.
- March 17: The Silver Stars signed Kelly Mazzante.
- April 20: The Silver Stars traded Michelle Snow to the Chicago Sky in exchange for Jia Perkins.
- May 2: The Silver Stars traded second- and third-round picks in the 2012 draft to the Tulsa Shock in exchange for Scholanda Robinson.
- May 16: The Silver Stars signed Alysha Clark.
- May 31: The Silver Stars waived Shanavia Dowdell.
- June 2: The Silver Stars waived Alysha Clark, Kelly Mazzante, and Ashley Walker.

=== Trades ===
Date	Trade	
April 20, 2011	To San Antonio Silver Stars	To Chicago Sky
April 20, 2011	Jia Perkins	Michelle Snow
May 2, 2011	To San Antonio Silver Stars	To Tulsa Shock
May 2, 2011	Scholanda Robinson	second- and third-round picks in 2012 draft

=== Personnel changes ===
==== Additions ====
Player	Signed	Former team
Tully Bevilaqua	March 7, 2011	Indiana Fever
Danielle Robinson	April 11, 2011	draft pick
Danielle Adams	April 11, 2011	draft pick
Porsha Phillips	April 11, 2011	draft pick
Jia Perkins	April 20, 2011	Chicago Sky
Scholanda Robinson	May 2, 2011	Tulsa Shock

==== Subtractions ====
Player	Left	New team
Michelle Snow	April 20, 2011	Chicago Sky
Ashley Battle	May 15, 2011	free agent
Helen Darling	May 15, 2011	free agent
Chamique Holdsclaw	May 15, 2011	free agent
Crystal Kelly	May 15, 2011	free agent
Edwige Lawson-Wade	May 15, 2011	free agent

== Roster ==
2011 San Antonio Silver Stars roster
Players
Coaches

Pos.	No.	Nat.	Name	Height	Weight	DOB	From	Yrs
F/C	23	(United States)	Adams, Danielle	6' 1" (1.85m)	239 lb (108kg)	1989-02-09	Texas A&M	R
C	32	(United States)	Appel, Jayne	6' 4" (1.93m)	210 lb (95kg)	1988-05-14	Stanford	1
G	41	(Australia)	Bevilaqua, Tully	5' 7" (1.7m)	145 lb (66kg)	1972-07-19	Australia	12
G	25	(United States)	Hammon, Becky	5' 6" (1.68m)	136 lb (62kg)	1977-03-11	Colorado State	12
G	5	(United States)	Hodges, Roneeka	5' 11" (1.8m)	165 lb (75kg)	1982-07-19	Florida State	6
G	7	(United States)	Perkins, Jia	5' 8" (1.73m)	155 lb (70kg)	1982-02-23	Texas Tech	7
F	21	(United States)	Phillips, Porsha	6' 2" (1.88m)	173 lb (78kg)	1988-01-13	Georgia	R
F/C	00	(United States)	Riley, Ruth	6' 5" (1.96m)	198 lb (90kg)	1979-08-28	Notre Dame	10
G	13	(United States)	Robinson, Danielle	5' 9" (1.75m)	125 lb (57kg)	1989-05-10	Oklahoma	R
G	3	(United States)	Robinson, Scholanda	5' 11" (1.8m)	162 lb (73kg)	1983-01-09	LSU	5
F	33	(Saint Vincent and the Grenadines)	Young, Sophia	6' 1" (1.85m)	165 lb (75kg)	1983-12-15	Baylor	5

Head coach
(United States) Dan Hughes (Muskingum)
Assistant coaches
(United States) Vickie Johnson (Louisiana Tech)
(United States) Steve Shuman (Sacramento State)
Athletic trainer
(United States) Tonya Holley (St. Andrews Presbyterian)
Strength and conditioning coach
(United States) Mike Ekanem (Texas Lutheran)

Legend

- (C) Team captain
- (DP) Unsigned draft pick
- (FA) Free agent
- (S) Suspended
- Injured

=== Depth ===
Pos.	Starter	Bench
C	Ruth Riley	Danielle Adams
PF	Sophia Young	Jayne Appel
SF	Scholanda Robinson	Porsha Phillips; Roneeka Hodges
SG	Tully Bevilaqua	Jia Perkins
PG	Becky Hammon	Danielle Robinson

== Season standings ==
Western Conference	W	L	PCT	GB	Home	Road	Conf.
Minnesota Lynx ^{x}	27	7	.794	–	14–3	13–4	18–4
Seattle Storm ^{x}	21	13	.618	6.0	15–2	6–11	15–7
Phoenix Mercury ^{x}	19	15	.559	8.0	11–6	8–9	11–11
San Antonio Silver Stars ^{x}	18	16	.529	9.0	9–8	9–8	11–11
Los Angeles Sparks ^{o}	15	19	.441	12.0	10–7	5–12	10–12
Tulsa Shock ^{o}	3	31	.088	24.0	2–15	1–16	1–21

== Schedule ==
=== Preseason ===
2011 Game Log: Preseason

Game	Date	Time (ET)	Opponent	Score	High points	High rebounds	High assists	Location/Attendance	Record
1	May 25	7:00pm	@ Connecticut	80–56	Young (14)	Riley (7)	Hammon (6)	Mohegan Sun Arena; 4,801	1–0
2	May 27	7:00pm	@ Connecticut	73–75	Perkins (13)	Phillips (10)	Robinson (6)	Mohegan Sun Arena at Casey Plaza; 2,139	1–1

=== Regular season ===
2011 Game Log: Regular Season
June

Game	Date	Time (ET)	Opponent	TV	Score	High points	High rebounds	High assists	Location/Attendance	Record
1	June 4	8:00pm	Tulsa	COX	93–73	Young (20)	Hodges; Riley; Young (4)	Hammon; Hodges; D. Robinson (5)	AT&T Center; 12,406	1–0
2	June 10	8:00pm	@ Tulsa		93–62	Hodges (19)	Phillips (8)	Hammon (5)	BOK Center; 7,509	2–0
3	June 11	8:00pm	Atlanta		86–74	Adams (32)	Adams (7)	Hammon (8)	AT&T Center; 9,140	3–0
4	June 17	10:00pm	@ Phoenix	FS-A	101–99	Young (26)	Young (8)	Hammon (9)	US Airways Center; 12,274	4–0
5	June 21	8:00pm	Phoenix	ESPN2	98–105	Hammon (28)	Appel (11)	Hammon; D. Robinson (7)	AT&T Center; 7,072	4–1
6	June 24	8:00pm	Los Angeles		90–80 (OT)	Perkins (31)	Riley (9)	Hammon (9)	AT&T Center; 8,617	5–1
7	June 26	3:00pm	@ Atlanta	NBATV; SSO	92–86	Perkins (25)	Perkins (8)	Hammon (6)	Philips Arena; 5,718	6–1
8	June 28	8:00pm	@ Chicago	CN100	84–74	Young (19)	Young (9)	Hammon (5)	Allstate Arena; 3,894	7–1

July

Game	Date	Time (ET)	Opponent	TV	Score	High points	High rebounds	High assists	Location/Attendance	Record
9	July 1	7:00pm	@ New York	NBATV	75–81	Adams (19)	Young (8)	Hammon (5)	Prudential Center; 6,714	7–2
10	July 8	8:00pm	New York	NBATV	73–76	Hammon (18)	Young (8)	Young (6)	AT&T Center; 8,100	7–3
11	July 12	8:00pm	Los Angeles	NBATV; FS-SW; PRIME	74–84	Young (22)	Young (11)	Hammon (7)	AT&T Center; 6,769	7–4
12	July 14	9:00pm	Seattle	ESPN2	69–66	Adams (23)	Adams; Young (6)	Hammon (9)	AT&T Center; 9,167	8–4
13	July 18	10:30pm	@ Los Angeles		79–69	Hammon (26)	Young (10)	D. Robinson (6)	Staples Center; 8,818	9–4
14	July 21	10:00pm	@ Seattle	NBATV; FS-SW	55–73	Young (12)	Appel (6)	Bevilaqua; Hammon (2)	KeyArena; 6,922	9–5
All-Star break
15	July 26	7:00pm	@ Washington	CSN-MA	73–67	Hammon (22)	Appel (12)	D. Robinson (3)	Verizon Center; 11,331	10–5
16	July 28	12:30pm	Phoenix	NBATV; FS-SW; FS-A	102–91	Hammon (33)	Appel (8)	D. Robinson (8)	AT&T Center; 14,797	11–5
17	July 31	3:00pm	Minnesota	NBATV	69–70	Perkins (18)	Appel (8)	Hammon (6)	AT&T Center; 7,260	11–6

August

Game	Date	Time (ET)	Opponent	TV	Score	High points	High rebounds	High assists	Location/Attendance	Record
18	August 2	10:00pm	@ Seattle		64–78	S. Robinson (12)	Young (5)	Bevilauqa; Hammon (4)	KeyArena; 6,179	11–7
19	August 4	8:00pm	@ Minnesota	NBATV; FS-SW	60–62	Young (18)	Young (13)	Hammon (4)	Target Center; 8,123	11–8
20	August 6	8:00pm	Tulsa		72–64	Young (20)	Appel (6)	Hammon (5)	AT&T Center; 8,273	12–8
21	August 9	7:00pm	@ Indiana		68–81	Hammon (19)	Young (9)	Hammon (5)	Conseco Fieldhouse; 7,520	12–9
22	August 11	7:30pm	@ Connecticut	FS-SW	72–59	Hammon (18)	Young (8)	Hammon (5)	Mohegan Sun Arena; 5,334	13–9
23	August 14	3:00pm	Chicago	NBATV; CN100	73–85	Perkins (18)	Young (6)	D. Robinson (7)	AT&T Center; 7,060	13–10
24	August 16	8:00pm	Indiana		63–65	Perkins; D. Robinson; S. Robinson (10)	Young (13)	Bevilaqua (4)	AT&T Center; 6,358	13–11
25	August 20	10:00pm	@ Phoenix	NBATV; FS-SW; FS-A	81–87	Hammon (22)	Hammon; Young (8)	Hammon (10)	US Airways Center; 10,134	13–12
26	August 23	10:00pm	@ Seattle		55–63	Young (14)	Young (8)	Hammon (5)	KeyArena; 6,559	13–13
27	August 26	8:00pm	@ Minnesota	NBATV	75–85	Adams (11)	Young (6)	Hammon (9)	Target Center; 9,212	13–14
28	August 28	3:00pm	Minnesota		61–72	Hodges (12)	Hammon (7)	Hammon (7)	AT&T Center; 7,924	13–15
29	August 30	8:00pm	Connecticut		78–66	Hammon (16)	Perkins (8)	Hammon (6)	AT&T Center; 6,934	14–15

September

Game	Date	Time (ET)	Opponent	TV	Score	High points	High rebounds	High assists	Location/Attendance	Record
30	September 1	8:00pm	Phoenix		86–68	Perkins (23)	Young (9)	D. Robinson (7)	AT&T Center; 6,502	15–15
31	September 3	8:00pm	Seattle	NBATV	60–70	Young (22)	Riley; Young (5)	D. Robinson (6)	AT&T Center; 9,575	15–16
32	September 6	10:30pm	@ Los Angeles	NBATV; FS-SW; PRIME	82–65	Hammon (37)	Appel (8)	Hammon (5)	Staples Center; 8,502	16–16
33	September 10	8:00pm	Washington	NBATV	82–74	Young (17)	Appel; Young (8)	Hammon (11)	AT&T Center; 12,813	17–16
34	September 11	7:00pm	@ Tulsa	NBATV; FS-SW	102–94 (OT)	D. Robinson (36)	Adams (8)	D. Robinson (6)	BOK Center; 5,949	18–16

All games are viewable on WNBA LiveAccess or ESPN3.com

=== Postseason ===
2011 Game Log: Postseason
Western Conference Semifinals

Game	Date	Time (ET)	Opponent	TV	Score	High points	High rebounds	High assists	Location/Attendance	Series
1	September 16	9:00pm	@ Minnesota	NBATV	65–66	Adams; Hammon (16)	Young (9)	Young (6)	Target Center; 11,891	0–1
2	September 18	5:00pm	Minnesota	ESPN2	84–75	Perkins (24)	Adams; Perkins (6)	Hammon (6)	AT&T Center; 7,023	1–1
3	September 20	8:00pm	@ Minnesota	ESPN2	67–85	Young (17)	Riley (6)	Hammon (5)	Target Center; 8,734	1–2

== Statistics ==
Legend
GP	Games played	GS	Games started	MPG	Minutes per game	RPG	Rebounds per game
APG	Assists per game	SPG	Steals per game	BPG	Blocks per game	PPG	Points per game
FG%	Field-goal percentage	3P%	3-point field-goal percentage	FT%	Free-throw percentage	TO	Turnovers per game
PF	Fouls per game		Team leader		League leader

=== Regular season ===
Player	GP	GS	MPG	FG%	3P%	FT%	RPG	APG	SPG	BPG	PPG
Danielle Adams	23	0	20.9	.430	.350	.746	4.3	0.6	0.52	0.65	12.4
Jayne Appel	31	0	14.6	.472	.333	.560	4.6	0.8	0.55	0.65	3.2
Tully Bevilaqua	34	25	14.5	.451	.286	.722	1.4	1.6	0.71	0.06	2.9
Becky Hammon	33	33	31.8	.440	.389	.892	2.9	5.8	1.48	0.21	15.9
Roneeka Hodges	28	5	9.8	.404	.400	1.000	1.3	0.5	0.18	0.07	3.9
Jia Perkins	34	8	25.1	.418	.313	.845	3.5	1.4	1.29	0.26	12.0
Porsha Phillips	31	1	8.3	.390	.000	.474	1.9	0.3	0.16	0.39	1.8
Ruth Riley	34	34	19.0	.485	.571	.769	3.8	1.2	0.35	0.88	5.6
Danielle Robinson	34	9	23.1	.460	.000	.903	2.3	3.9	0.82	0.12	8.2
Scholanda Robinson	32	22	16.2	.335	.340	.705	1.5	0.4	0.72	0.22	4.8
Sophia Young	33	33	31.6	.429	.000	.592	6.4	2.3	2.03	0.48	13.2

=== Postseason ===
Player	GP	GS	MPG	FG%	3P%	FT%	RPG	APG	SPG	BPG	PPG
Danielle Adams											
Jayne Appel											
Tully Bevilaqua											
Becky Hammon											
Roneeka Hodges											
Jia Perkins											
Porsha Phillips											
Ruth Riley											
Danielle Robinson											
Scholanda Robinson											
Sophia Young											

== Awards and honors ==
- Becky Hammon was named WNBA Western Conference Player of the Week for the week of July 25, 2011.
- Danielle Adams was named Rookie of the Month for the month of June.
- Danielle Adams was named to the 2011 WNBA All-Star Team as a reserve.
- Becky Hammon was named to the 2011 WNBA All-Star Team as a reserve.
- Danielle Adams was named to the All-Rookie Team.
- Danielle Robinson was named to the All-Rookie Team.
