= 2010 Tulsa Shock season =

- Head coach: Nolan Richardson
- Arena: BOK Center

Results
- Record: 6–28 (.176)
- Place: 6th (Western)
- Playoff finish: Did not qualify

Media
- Television: COX, FS-OK; NBATV, ESPN2

The 2010 WNBA season was the 13th season for the Tulsa Shock franchise of the Women's National Basketball Association. It is their first in Tulsa.

== Transactions ==
=== Dispersal draft ===
Based on the Detroit Shock's 2009 record, the Tulsa Shock would pick 7th in the Sacramento Monarchs dispersal draft. The Shock picked Scholanda Robinson.

=== WNBA draft ===
The following are the Shock's selections in the 2010 WNBA draft.

Round	Pick	Player	Position	Nationality	College
2	19	Amanda Thompson	F	United States	Oklahoma
3	31	Vivian Frieson	F	United States	Gonzaga

=== Transaction log ===
- March 10: The Shock signed Marion Jones, Natashy Lacy and Iciss Tillis to training camp contracts.
- April 1: The Shock signed Ivory Latta to a training camp contract.
- April 7: The Shock acquired Amber Holt and Chante Black from the Connecticut Sun in exchange for the seventh pick in the 2010 Draft and a second-round pick in the 2011 Draft.
- April 14: The Shock traded Crystal Kelly to the San Antonio Silver Stars in exchange for Shanna Crossley.
- April 26: The Shock signed Juanita Ward, Kim Sitzmann, Danielle Green, Brittany Gilliam and Monique Alexander to training camp contracts.
- April 28: The Shock signed Christi Thomas.
- April 29: The Shock waived Kim Sitzmann, Monique Alexander, Danielle Green and Brittany Gilliam.
- May 5: The Shock waived Vivian Frieson and Juanita Ward.
- May 11: The Shock released Cheryl Ford.
- May 13: The Shock waived Ivory Latta and Christi Thomas.
- May 14: The Shock waived Olayinka Sanni and Iciss Tillis.
- May 27: The Shock traded Shavonte Zellous to the Indiana Fever in exchange for a second-round pick in the 2011 Draft.
- June 2: The Shock signed Ashley Walker.
- June 8: The Shock waived Amanda Thompson and Ashley Walker and signed Kiesha Brown and Jennifer Lacy.
- June 14: The Shock traded Plenette Pierson to the New York Liberty in exchange for Tiffany Jackson.
- July 23: The Shock traded Kara Braxton to the Phoenix Mercury in exchange for Nicole Ohlde and a first-round pick in the 2011 Draft.
- July 26: The Shock traded Alexis Hornbuckle to the Minnesota Lynx in exchange for Rashanda McCants.

=== Trades ===
Date	Trade	
April 7, 2010	To Tulsa Shock	To Connecticut Sun
April 7, 2010	Amber Holt and Chante Black	Seventh pick in 2010 Draft and second-round pick in 2011 Draft
April 14, 2010	To Tulsa Shock	To San Antonio Silver Stars
April 14, 2010	Shanna Crossley	Crystal Kelly
May 27, 2010	To Tulsa Shock	To Indiana Fever
May 27, 2010	Second-round pick in 2011 Draft	Shavonte Zellous
June 14, 2010	To Tulsa Shock	To New York Liberty
June 14, 2010	Tiffany Jackson	Plenette Pierson
July 22, 2010	To Tulsa Shock	To Phoenix Mercury
July 22, 2010	Nicole Ohlde and a first-round pick in 2011 Draft	Kara Braxton
July 26, 2010	To Tulsa Shock	To Minnesota Lynx
July 26, 2010	Rashanda McCants	Alexis Hornbuckle

=== Free agents ===
==== Additions ====
Player	Signed	Former team
Scholanda Robinson	December 14, 2009	Sacramento Monarchs
Marion Jones	March 10, 2010	free agent
Amber Holt	April 7, 2010	Connecticut Sun
Chante Black	April 7, 2010	Connecticut Sun
Shanna Crossley	April 14, 2010	San Antonio Silver Stars
Ashley Walker	June 2, 2010	free agent
Kiesha Brown	June 8, 2010	free agent
Jennifer Lacy	June 8, 2010	free agent
Tiffany Jackson	June 14, 2010	New York Liberty
Ivory Latta	July 5, 2010	free agent
Nicole Ohlde	July 23, 2010	Phoenix Mercury
Rashanda McCants	July 26, 2010	Minnesota Lynx

==== Subtractions ====
Player	Left	New team
Deanna Nolan		hiatus
Nikki Teasley		hiatus
Katie Smith	March 16, 2010	Washington Mystics
Taj McWilliams-Franklin	April 22, 2010	New York Liberty
Crystal Kelly	April 14, 2010	San Antonio Silver Stars
Cheryl Ford	May 11, 2010	free agent
Olayinka Sanni	May 14, 2010	free agent
Shavonte Zellous	May 27, 2010	Indiana Fever
Ashley Walker	June 8, 2010	free agent
Amanda Thompson	June 8, 2010	free agent
Plenette Pierson	June 14, 2010	New York Liberty
Natasha Lacy	July 5, 2010	free agent
Kara Braxton	July 23, 2010	Phoenix Mercury
Alexis Hornbuckle	July 26, 2010	Minnesota Lynx

== Roster ==
2010 Tulsa Shock roster
Players
Coaches

Pos.	No.	Nat.	Name	Height	Weight	From
C	11	(United States)	Black, Chante	6' 5" (1.96m)	188 lb (85kg)	Duke
G	8	(United States)	Brown, Kiesha	5' 10" (1.78m)	134 lb (61kg)	Georgia
SG	0	(United States)	Crossley, Shanna	5' 10" (1.78m)	155 lb (70kg)	Tennessee
G/F	4	(United States)	Holt, Amber	6' 0" (1.83m)	170 lb (77kg)	Middle Tennessee
PF	33	(United States)	Jackson, Tiffany	6' 3" (1.91m)	185 lb (84kg)	Texas
G	20	(United States)	Jones, Marion	5' 10" (1.78m)	150 lb (68kg)	North Carolina
F	21	(United States)	Lacy, Jennifer	6' 3" (1.91m)	175 lb (79kg)	Pepperdine
G	12	(United States)	Latta, Ivory	5' 6" (1.68m)	143 lb (65kg)	North Carolina
F	32	(United States)	McCants, Rashanda	6' 1" (1.85m)	161 lb (73kg)	North Carolina
F/C	30	(United States)	Ohlde, Nicole	6' 5" (1.96m)	190 lb (86kg)	Kansas State
G	5	(United States)	Robinson, Scholanda	5' 11" (1.8m)	165 lb (75kg)	LSU

Head coach
(United States) Nolan Richardson (UTEP)
Assistant coaches
(United States) Wayne Stehlik (Nebraska Wesleyan)
(United States) Tammy Bagby (Langston)
Athletic trainer
(United States) Stuart Nichols (Northeastern State)

Legend

- (C) Team captain
- (DP) Unsigned draft pick
- (FA) Free agent
- (S) Suspended
- Injured

WNBA roster page

=== Depth ===
Pos.	Starter	Bench
C	Nicole Ohlde	Chante Black
PF	Tiffany Jackson	Jennifer Lacy
SF	Rashanda McCants	Amber Holt
SG	Scholanda Robinson	Shanna Crossley / Marion Jones
PG	Ivory Latta	Kiesha Brown

== Season standings ==
Western Conference	W	L	PCT	GB	Home	Road	Conf.
Seattle Storm ^{x}	28	6	.824	–	17–0	11–6	20–2
Phoenix Mercury ^{x}	15	19	.441	13.0	9–8	6–11	13–9
San Antonio Silver Stars ^{x}	14	20	.412	14.0	8–9	6–11	11–11
Los Angeles Sparks ^{x}	13	21	.382	15.0	8–9	5–12	10–12
Minnesota Lynx ^{o}	13	21	.382	15.0	7–10	6–11	8–14
Tulsa Shock ^{o}	6	28	.176	22.0	4–13	2–15	4–18

== Schedule ==
=== Preseason ===
2010 Game Log: Preseason

Game	Date	Time (ET)	Opponent	Score	High points	High rebounds	High assists	Location/Attendance	Record
1	May 9	2:00pm	Seattle	90–80	Braxton, Holt (14)	Black (8)	Lacy, Pierson (4)	BOK Center; N/A	1–0

=== Regular season ===
2010 Game Log: Regular Season
May

Game	Date	Time (ET)	Opponent	TV	Score	High points	High rebounds	High assists	Location/Attendance	Record
1	May 15	8:00pm	Minnesota	NBATV; COX	74–80	Holt (16)	Black (10)	Lacy (5)	BOK Center; 7,806	0-1
2	May 20	12:30pm	San Antonio	NBATV; FS-OK; FS-SW	74-83	Braxton (15)	Braxton, Holt (6)	Zellous (4)	BOK Center; 4,636	0-2
3	May 23	7:00pm	@ Minnesota		94-82	Pierson, Zellous (14)	Black (17)	Lacy (7)	Target Center; 6,822	1-2
4	May 25	7:00pm	Phoenix	ESPN2	96-110	Holt (20)	Black (12)	Lacy (7)	BOK Center; 4,100	1-3
5	May 29	8:00pm	Indiana	NBATV; FS-OK	79-74	Holt (16)	Black (11)	Lacy (5)	BOK Center; 4,005	2-3

June

Game	Date	Time	Opponent	TV (ET)	Score	High points	High rebounds	High assists	Location/Attendance	Record
6	June 4	8:00pm	Minnesota	FS-OK	92-79	Robinson (20)	Black (11)	Lacy (6)	BOK Center; 4,521	3-3
7	June 5	8:00pm	@ Chicago	CN100	70-95	Crossley (20)	Braxton (9)	Lacy (7)	Allstate Arena; 4,549	3-4
8	June 11	8:00pm	@ San Antonio		75-87	Braxton (14)	Black (9)	Lacy (5)	AT&T Center; 7,076	3-5
9	June 12	10:00pm	@ Phoenix		84-116	Crossley (17)	Hornbuckle (8)	Braxton, Crossley (4)	US Airways Center; 6,580	3-6
10	June 18	8:00pm	@ Minnesota		67-78	Brown (14)	Braxton (7)	Crossley, Lacy (3)	Target Center; 6,953	3-7
11	June 19	8:00pm	Minnesota	COX	78-92	Robinson (14)	Jackson (6)	Hornbuckle, Robinson (4)	BOK Center; 5,013	3-8
12	June 23	12:00pm	@ Atlanta	NBATV; FS-OK; SSO	90-96	Robinson (17)	Black (12)	Brown (7)	Philips Arena; 9,598	3-9
13	June 25	8:00pm	New York	COX	78-92	Lacy (16)	Black (9)	Hornbuckle, Robinson (3)	BOK Center; 4,554	3-10
14	June 27	4:00pm	Seattle	COX	72-83	Robinson (16)	Jackson (8)	Brown, Jackson, Lacy (3)	BOK Center; 4,865	3-11
15	June 29	8:00pm	Connecticut	COX	89-101	Robinson (19)	Black (6)	Brown (7)	BOK Center; 3,649	3-12

July

Game	Date	Time	Opponent	TV	Score	High points	High rebounds	High assists	Location/Attendance	Record
16	July 3	8:00pm	Washington	COX	54-69	Robinson (16)	Black, Jackson (5)	Brown (2)	BOK Center; 3,516	3-13
17	July 8	7:00pm	@ Indiana		72-100	Holt (18)	Black (12)	Black (5)	Conseco Fieldhouse; 7,077	3-14
18	July 13	7:00pm	Los Angeles	ESPN2	71-87	Brown (14)	Braxton (10)	Latta (6)	BOK Center; 7,073	3-15
19	July 16	8:00pm	@ San Antonio		75-70	Latta (15)	Braxton, Jackson, Lacy (5)	Latta (4)	AT&T Center; 9,298	4-15
20	July 17	10:00pm	@ Phoenix		88-97	Robinson (15)	Black (13)	Brown (7)	US Airways Center; 8,564	4-16
21	July 20	3:00pm	@ Los Angeles		83-86 (OT)	Robinson (19)	Jackson (9)	Latta (7)	STAPLES Center; 14,413	4-17
22	July 22	8:00pm	Phoenix	COX	91-123	Braxton (18)	Jackson (9)	Latta (6)	BOK Center; 3,333	4-18
23	July 25	9:00pm	@ Seattle	KONG	59-75	Crossley (19)	Robinson (6)	Brown, Jackson (2)	KeyArena; 9,686	4-19
24	July 27	1:30pm	Atlanta	NBATV; COX	89-105	Latta (23)	Ohlde (7)	Latta (6)	BOK Center; 3,800	4-20
25	July 30	8:00pm	San Antonio	NBATV; FS-OK	85-101	Latta (19)	Jackson (7)	Brown (5)	BOK Center; 5,203	4-21

August

Game	Date	Time	Opponent	TV	Score	High points	High rebounds	High assists	Location/Attendance	Record
26	August 1	4:00pm	@ Washington	NBATV; CSN-MA	62-87	Jackson (14)	Jackson (7)	Brown (3)	Verizon Center; 9,008	4-22
27	August 3	8:00pm	Seattle	COX	84-75	Robinson (21)	Jackson (5)	Latta (7)	BOK Center; 3,697	5-22
28	August 6	10:30pm	@ Los Angeles		70-77	Latta (16)	Jackson (9)	Ohlde (4)	STAPLES Center; 8,962	5-23
29	August 7	10:00pm	@ Seattle	KONG	65-111	Latta (14)	Jackson (6)	Jackson, Jones, Latta (4)	KeyArena; 9,686	5-24
30	August 13	8:00pm	@ San Antonio		74-94	Robinson (14)	Jackson (5)	Latta (5)	AT&T Center; 10,244	5-25
31	August 14	8:00pm	Los Angeles	COX	87-92	Latta (26)	Jackson (13)	Holt, Latta (4)	BOK Center; 5,719	5-26
32	August 17	7:30pm	@ Connecticut		62-90	Robinson (18)	Holt (7)	Holt (3)	Mohegan Sun Arena; 8,828	5-27
33	August 19	7:30pm	@ New York		85-95	Crossley (21)	Black (9)	Jackson, Robinson (4)	Madison Square Garden; 8,766	5-28
34	August 21	8:00pm	Chicago	NBATV; FS-OK	84-71	Crossley, Jackson (17)	Jackson (9)	Latta (5)	BOK Center; 6,321	6-28

== Statistics ==
Legend
GP	Games played	GS	Games started	MPG	Minutes per game	RPG	Rebounds per game
APG	Assists per game	SPG	Steals per game	BPG	Blocks per game	PPG	Points per game
FG%	Field-goal percentage	3P%	3-point field-goal percentage	FT%	Free-throw percentage	TO	Turnovers per game
PF	Fouls per game		Team leader		League leader

=== Regular season ===
Player	GP	GS	MPG	FG%	3P%	FT%	RPG	APG	SPG	BPG	PPG
Chante Black	34	23	20.9	.537	.000	.347	6.5	0.6	0.53	1.59	3.4
Kara Braxton	22	16	16.8	.500	.250	.639	4.6	1.3	1.10	0.80	9.3
Kiesha Brown	27	8	17.8	.389	.391	.821	2.0	2.4	0.56	0.00	5.7
Shanna Crossley	30	16	21.3	.404	.422	.800	1.4	1.6	0.87	0.07	9.7
Amber Holt	33	9	21.1	.408	.314	.802	3.1	1.8	0.91	0.21	8.7
Alexis Hornbuckle	15	10	21.1	.373	.400	.833	3.5	2.7	1.50	0.70	5.8
Tiffany Jackson	25	17	23.7	.399	1.000	.797	5.8	1.4	1.36	0.32	7.6
Marion Jones	33	1	9.4	.525	.250	.595	1.6	0.6	0.55	0.21	3.4
Jennifer Lacy	34	3	16.8	.383	.386	.750	3.0	0.8	0.79	0.29	7.0
Natasha Lacy	16	3	18.3	.475	.250	.595	2.3	3.5	1.44	0.19	6.3
Ivory Latta	18	16	28.7	.422	.370	.776	1.4	3.9	1.00	0.11	12.4
Rashanda McCants	6	4	17.7	.350	.278	.400	2.0	1.5	0.83	0.50	5.8
Nicole Ohlde	12	9	25.1	.443	.000	.773	3.8	1.4	0.67	0.75	7.9
Plenette Pierson	8	1	15.8	.535	.429	.857	2.5	1.3	1.20	0.40	12.1
Scholanda Robinson	34	33	24.6	.402	.303	.708	2.4	1.7	1.56	0.35	11.9
Amanda Thompson	7	0	7.0	.143	.000	.700	1.6	0.4	0.43	0.00	1.6
Ashley Walker	2	0	4.5	.000	.000	.000	0.0	0.0	1.00	0.00	0.0
Shavonte Zellous	4	1	16.8	.161	.100	.833	0.8	2.5	0.50	0.00	4.0
