= 2012 Tulsa Shock season =

- Head coach: Gary Kloppenburg
- Arena: BOK Center

Results
- Record: 9–25 (.265)
- Place: 6th (Western)
- Playoff finish: Did not qualify

Media
- Television: ESPN2, NBATV

The 2012 WNBA season was the 15th season for the Tulsa Shock of the Women's National Basketball Association. It is their third in Tulsa.

== Transactions ==
=== WNBA draft ===
The following are the Shock's selections in the 2012 WNBA draft.

Round	Pick	Player	Nationality	College
1	4	Glory Johnson	United States	Tennessee
2	17	Riquna Williams	United States	Miami (FL)
3	25	Vicki Baugh	United States	Tennessee
3	29	Lynetta Kizer	United States	Maryland

- Note: Picks 17 and 29 were traded to the Shock from the San Antonio Silver Stars

=== Transaction log ===
- February 1, 2011: The Shock traded a second-round pick in the 2012 Draft to the Los Angeles Sparks in exchange for Andrea Riley.
- April 11, 2011: The Shock acquired second- and third-round picks in the 2012 Draft from the San Antonio Silver Stars in exchange for Scholanda Robinson.
- January 12: The Shock traded Andrea Riley to the Phoenix Mercury in exchange for Temeka Johnson.
- February 10: The Shock re-signed Amber Holt, Abi Olajuwon, and Shanna Zolman.
- February 13: The Shock re-signed Jennifer Lacy.
- February 17: The Shock signed Scholanda Dorrell.
- February 27: The Shock signed Jené Morris.
- March 5: The Shock signed Chanel Mokango.
- April 17: The Shock signed Lorin Dixon.
- April 23: The Shock signed draft picks Vicki Baugh and Lynetta Kizer and waived Abi Olajuwon.
- April 26: The Shock signed draft picks Glory Johnson and Riquna Williams.
- April 27: The Shock signed Marshae Dotson and waived Chanel Mokango.
- May 6: The Shock waived Marshae Dotson.
- May 14: The Shock waived Lorin Dixon and Vicki Baugh.
- May 15: The Shock waived Amber Holt and Shanna Zolman.
- June 17: The Shock waived Jene Morris.
- June 18: The shock signed Amber Holt and Courtney Paris and waived Lynetta Kizer.
- July 2: The Shock traded Karima Christmas to the Indiana Fever in exchange for Roneeka Hodges.

=== Trades ===
Date	Trade	
January 12, 2012	To Tulsa Shock	To Phoenix Mercury
January 12, 2012	Temeka Johnson	Andrea Riley
July 2, 2012	To Tulsa Shock	To Indiana Fever
July 2, 2012	Roneeka Hodges	Karima Christmas

=== Personnel changes ===
==== Additions ====
Player	Signed	Former team
Chante Black	2012	injury
Temeka Johnson	January 12, 2012	Phoenix Mercury
Scholanda Dorrell	February 17, 2012	San Antonio Silver Stars
Glory Johnson	April 16, 2012	draft pick
Riquna Williams	April 16, 2012	draft pick
Courtney Paris	June 18, 2012	free agent
Roneeka Hodges	July 2, 2012	Indiana Fever

==== Subtractions ====
Player	Left	New team
Betty Lennox	2012	free agent
Sheryl Swoopes	2012	free agent
Tiffany Jackson	2012	maternity leave
Andrea Riley	January 12, 2012	Phoenix Mercury
Abi Olajuwon	April 21, 2012	free agent
Karima Christmas	July 2, 2012	Indiana Fever

== Roster ==
2012 Tulsa Shock roster
Players
Coaches

Pos.	No.	Nat.	Name	Height	Weight	DOB	From	Yrs
C	11	(United States)	Black, Chante	6' 5" (1.96m)	188 lb (85kg)	1985-11-12	Duke	2
C	8	(Australia)	Cambage, Liz (IN)	6' 8" (2.03m)	215 lb (98kg)	1991-02-18	Australia	1
G	5	(United States)	Dorrell, Scholanda	5' 11" (1.8m)	162 lb (73kg)	1983-01-09	LSU	6
G	15	(United States)	Hodges, Roneeka	5' 11" (1.8m)	165 lb (75kg)	1982-07-19	Florida State	7
G/F	4	(United States)	Holt, Amber	6' 0" (1.83m)	170 lb (77kg)	1985-06-07	Middle Tennessee	4
F	25	(United States)	Johnson, Glory	6' 3" (1.91m)	170 lb (77kg)	1990-07-27	Tennessee	R
G	2	(United States)	Johnson, Temeka	5' 3" (1.6m)	142 lb (64kg)	1982-09-06	LSU	7
F	21	(United States)	Lacy, Jennifer	6' 3" (1.91m)	175 lb (79kg)	1983-03-21	Pepperdine	6
G	12	(United States)	Latta, Ivory	5' 6" (1.68m)	143 lb (65kg)	1984-09-25	North Carolina	5
C	3	(United States)	Paris, Courtney	6' 4" (1.93m)	250 lb (113kg)	1987-09-21	Oklahoma	2
F	14	(United States)	Pedersen, Kayla	6' 4" (1.93m)	190 lb (86kg)	1989-04-14	Stanford	1
G	1	(United States)	Williams, Riquna	5' 7" (1.7m)	165 lb (75kg)	1990-05-28	Miami (FL)	R

Head coach
(United States) Gary Kloppenburg (UC San Diego)
Assistant coaches
(United States) Jason Glover (Grand Canyon)
(United States) Kathy McConnell-Miller (Colorado)
Athletic trainer
(United States) Allison Russell (Tulsa)

Legend

- (C) Team captain
- (DP) Unsigned draft pick
- (FA) Free agent
- (S) Suspended
- Injured

=== Depth ===
Pos.	Starter	Bench
C	Glory Johnson	Chante Black; Liz Cambage
PF	Kayla Pedersen	Courtney Paris; Jennifer Lacy
SF	Amber Holt	Roneeka Hodges
SG	Ivory Latta	Riquna Williams; Scholanda Dorrell
PG	Temeka Johnson

== Season standings ==
Western Conference	W	L	PCT	GB	Home	Road	Conf.
Minnesota Lynx ^{z}	27	7	.794	–	16–1	11–6	17–5
Los Angeles Sparks ^{x}	24	10	.706	3.0	16–1	8–9	15–7
San Antonio Silver Stars ^{x}	21	13	.618	6.0	12–5	9–8	14–8
Seattle Storm ^{x}	16	18	.471	11.0	10–7	6–11	11–11
Tulsa Shock ^{o}	9	25	.265	18.0	6–11	3–14	5–17
Phoenix Mercury ^{o}	7	27	.206	20.0	3–14	4–13	4–18

== Schedule ==
=== Preseason ===
2012 Game Log: Preseason (May)

Game	Date	Time (ET)	Opponent	TV	Score	High points	High rebounds	High assists	Location/Attendance	Record
1	Sat 5	2:00	@ Atlanta		89-91	Latta (18)	Morris (6)	Latta (4)	Philips Arena; 4,340	0-1
2	Fri 11	12:30	Seattle		86-60	G. Johnson; Williams (10)	Kizer (5)	T. Johnson (5)	BOK Center; 5,297	1-1

=== Regular season ===
2012 Game Log: Regular Season
May (0–4)

Game	Date	Time (ET)	Opponent	TV	Score	High points	High rebounds	High assists	Location/Attendance	Record
1	Sat 19	8:00	San Antonio	FS-SW	79-88	T. Johnson (21)	G. Johnson (10)	T. Johnson (9)	BOK Center; 7,509	0-1
2	Tue 22	8:00	Phoenix		87-89	T. Johnson; Latta (16)	Black (7)	T. Johnson (7)	BOK Center; 5,341	0-2
3	Sat 26	7:00	@ Washington		61-64	Latta (16)	T. Johnson (5)	T. Johnson (4)	Verizon Center; 11,866	0-3
4	Tue 29	10:30	@ Los Angeles		75-76	Williams (19)	G. Johnson; Pedersen; Williams (5)	T. Johnson (5)	Staples Center; 8,312	0-4

June (2-8)

Game	Date	Time (ET)	Opponent	TV	Score	High points	High rebounds	High assists	Location/Attendance	Record
5	Fri 1	10:00	@ Seattle		58-76	Lacy (12)	G. Johnson; Pedersen (6)	Williams (3)	KeyArena; 7,489	0-5
6	Sun 3	6:00	@ Phoenix		72-79	Lacy (19)	T. Johnson (9)	T. Johnson; Latta (3)	US Airways Center; 7,178	0-6
7	Fri 8	8:30	@ Chicago	CN100	91-98 (OT)	Latta (25)	Pedersen (9)	T. Johnson; Latta (6)	Allstate Arena; 5,019	0-7
8	Sat 9	8:00	Minnesota		73-93	Lacy (15)	Pedersen (10)	T. Johnson (6)	BOK Center; 5,113	0-8
9	Fri 15	8:00	Seattle		73-86	Lacy (16)	G. Johnson; Pedersen; T. Johnson; Latta (5)	T. Johnson (8)	BOK Center; 5,100	0-9
10	Sun 17	4:00	Phoenix		87-75	T. Johnson (22)	G. Johnson (9)	T. Johnson (5)	BOK Center; 4,200	1-9
11	Wed 20	10:30	@ Los Angeles		79-95	G. Johnson (19)	G. Johnson; Paris (8)	T. Johnson (4)	Staples Center; 8,388	1-10
12	Sat 23	8:00	Indiana		70-73	G. Johnson (22)	Paris (11)	Latta (5)	BOK Center; 4,209	1-11
13	Tue 26	8:00	Los Angeles		91-75	Williams (27)	G. Johnson; Pedersen (6)	Latta (8)	BOK Center; 4,102	2-11
14	Fri 29	8:00	Atlanta		92-102	G. Johnson; Latta (16)	Pedersen (8)	T. Johnson (8)	BOK Center; 4,235	2-12

July (1–3)

Game	Date	Time (ET)	Opponent	TV	Score	High points	High rebounds	High assists	Location/Attendance	Record
15	Fri 6	8:00	Connecticut		75-86	Latta (24)	G. Johnson (7)	Pedersen (5)	BOK Center; 4,318	2-13
16	Sun 8	4:00	Washington		78-62	Latta (18)	Latta (6)	T. Johnson; Latta (3)	BOK Center; 4,003	3-13
17	Tue 10	12:30	Minnesota		86-107	Latta (25)	5 players (3)	T. Johnson (7)	BOK Center; 6,012	3-14
18	Thu 12	1:00	@ Minnesota		74-89	G. Johnson (30)	G. Johnson (14)	Latta (4)	Target Center; 15,318	3-15
Summer Olympic break

August (1–3)

Game	Date	Time (ET)	Opponent	TV	Score	High points	High rebounds	High assists	Location/Attendance	Record
Summer Olympic break
19	Fri 17	8:00	San Antonio		79-89	Williams (17)	Pedersen (8)	T. Johnson (6)	BOK Center; 6,270	3-16
20	Sun 19	7:00	@ Minnesota	NBATV	59-83	G. Johnson (17)	G. Johnson (12)	T. Johnson	Target Center; 10,223	3-17
21	Tue 21	7:00	@ Connecticut		80-82 (OT)	T. Johnson; Lacy (14)	G. Johnson (15)	T. Johnson (7)	Mohegan Sun Arena; 6,745	3-18
22	Fri 24	8:00	Chicago		81-78 (OT)	Hodges; Williams (22)	G. Johnson (12)	G. Johnson (5)	BOK Center; 5,147	4-18
23	Sat 25	8:00	@ San Antonio	FS-SW	71-91	Williams (17)	G. Johnson (9)	Latta (5)	AT&T Center; 9,029	4-19
24	Tue 28	7:00	@ Atlanta	FS-S	84-80	Hodges (20)	G. Johnson (8)	T. Johnson (6)	Philips Arena; 2,813	5-19
25	Thu 30	8:00	Los Angeles		99-85	Latta (21)	Holt; G. Johnson (6)	Latta (14)	BOK Center; 5,275	6-19
26	Fri 31	8:00	@ Minnesota	NBATV	83-92	Williams (21)	G. Johnson (6)	G. Johnson; Latta (4)	Target Center; 9,213	6-20

September (0–0)

Game	Date	Time (ET)	Opponent	TV	Score	High points	High rebounds	High assists	Location/Attendance	Record
27	Thu 6	10:00	@ Seattle		74-101	Latta (18)	R. Hodges (7)	R. Williams (5)	KeyArena; 5,948	6-21
28	Sat 8	8:00	Seattle		66-89	Latta (14)	Pedersen (7)	R. Williams (6)	BOK Center; 7,415	6-22
29	Wed 12	8:00	San Antonio		67-78	G. Johnson (18)	Hodges (6)	T. Johnson (4)	BOK Center; 4,543	6-23
30	Fri 14	10:00	@ Phoenix		92-84	Latta (20)	R. Williams; G. Johnson (6)	R. Williams (4)	US Airways Center; 6,719	7-23
31	Sun 16	3:00	@ San Antonio		80-70	T. Johnson (18)	G. Johnson (11)	Latta (4)	AT&T Center; 5,246	8-23
32	Thu 20	8:00	New York		78-66	T. Johnson (26)	G. Johnson (7)	T. Johnson (6)	BOK Center; 5,661	9-23
33	Sat 22	2:00	@ New York	NBATV; MSG	74-91	Latta (16)	Paris; Pedersen; R. Williams; G. Johnson (4)	Latta (6)	Prudential Center; 8,508	9-24
34	Sun 23	5:00	@ Indiana	NBATV; FS-I	58-91	Latta (16)	G. Johnson (11)	Latta (4)	Bankers Life Fieldhouse; 9,225	9-25

All games are viewable on WNBA LiveAccess or ESPN3.com

== Statistics ==
Legend
GP	Games played	GS	Games started	MPG	Minutes per game	RPG	Rebounds per game
APG	Assists per game	SPG	Steals per game	BPG	Blocks per game	PPG	Points per game
FG%	Field-goal percentage	3P%	3-point field-goal percentage	FT%	Free-throw percentage	TO	Turnovers per game
PF	Fouls per game		Team leader		League leader

=== Regular season ===
Player	GP	GS	MPG	FG%	3P%	FT%	RPG	APG	SPG	BPG	PPG
