= Mekia Valentine =

American basketball player

Personal information
- Born: March 6, 1988 (age 38) Greensboro, North Carolina, U.S.
- Died: March 26, 2020 (aged 32) Santa Barbara, California, U.S.
- Listed height: 6 ft 4 in (1.93 m)

Career information
- High school: Greenoboro Day School; Greensboro, North Carolina; Dudley High School; Suva, Fiji
- College: Wake Forest (2006–2008); UC Santa Barbara (2009–2011)
- WNBA draft: 2011: 3rd round, 34th overall pick
- Drafted by: New York Liberty
- Position: Forward / Center

Career highlights
- Big West Defensive Player of the Year (2011); ACC All-Freshman Team (2007)
- Stats at Basketball Reference

Mekia Valentine (March 6, 1988 – March 26, 2020) was a professional international basketball player. She was recruited by the WNBA and played for the University of California at Santa Barbara Gaucho team.

== Sport career ==
Valentine was a 6-foot-4 forward. She began playing basketball in high school with Greensoboro Day School before transferring to Dudley High School for her senior year. She was named 3rd-best forward in the nation by Full Court Press. She was named Dudley's MVP and 3A Conference Player of the Year.

She was a top-25 national recruit and earned ACC All-Freshman Honors in 2007 at Wake Forest University.

When she began playing for UCSB's Gauchos team as a junior, she averaged 12.3 points, 9.7 rebounds and 4.0 blocks per game and helped the team make WNIT. The following year, Valentine averaged 11.1 points, 11.2 rebounds and 3.7 blocks. She had many of the school's records, including career rebound average (10.5), blocks in a game (11), blocks in a season (120) and season (.620) and career (.595) field-goal percentage. She was named the Big West's Defensive Player of the Year.

In 2011 she was drafted to the WNBA, by New York Liberty. She chose a four-year career in international basketball, playing in Israel, Poland, Germany, and Romania. In 2016 she retired from basketball and pursued nursing. She worked in patient care before transitioning to the private sector.

=== Wake Forest and UC Santa Barbara statistics ===
Legend
GP	Games played	GS	Games started	MPG	Minutes per game
FG%	Field goal percentage	3P%	3-point field goal percentage	FT%	Free throw percentage
RPG	Rebounds per game	APG	Assists per game	SPG	Steals per game
BPG	Blocks per game	PPG	Points per game	**Bold**	Career high

Year	Team	GP	Points	FG%	3P%	FT%	RPG	APG	SPG	BPG	PPG
2006-07	Wake Forest	29	170	46.8%	0.0%	37.3%	4.7	0.2	**0.4**	1.7	5.9
2007-08	Wake Forest	30	181	47.7%	0.0%	48.1%	4.8	0.2	0.3	1.5	6.0
2009-10	UC Santa Barbara	30	**370**	57.4%	0.0%	**55.6%**	9.7	**0.8**	0.4	**4.0**	**12.3**
2010-11	UC Santa Barbara	**31**	343	**62.0%**	0.0%	47.6%	**11.2**	0.5	0.3	3.7	11.1
Career		120	1064	54.8%	11.1%	48.9%	5.3	0.5	0.3	2.7	8.9

== Personal life ==
Valentine was originally from Greensboro, North Carolina. She was the daughter of Lisa Meadows Johnson and Jerome Early Valentine III. Her grandmother, Lillian Manns Valentine, adopted her in infancy and raised her.
