= Kayla Pedersen =

American basketball player (born 1989)

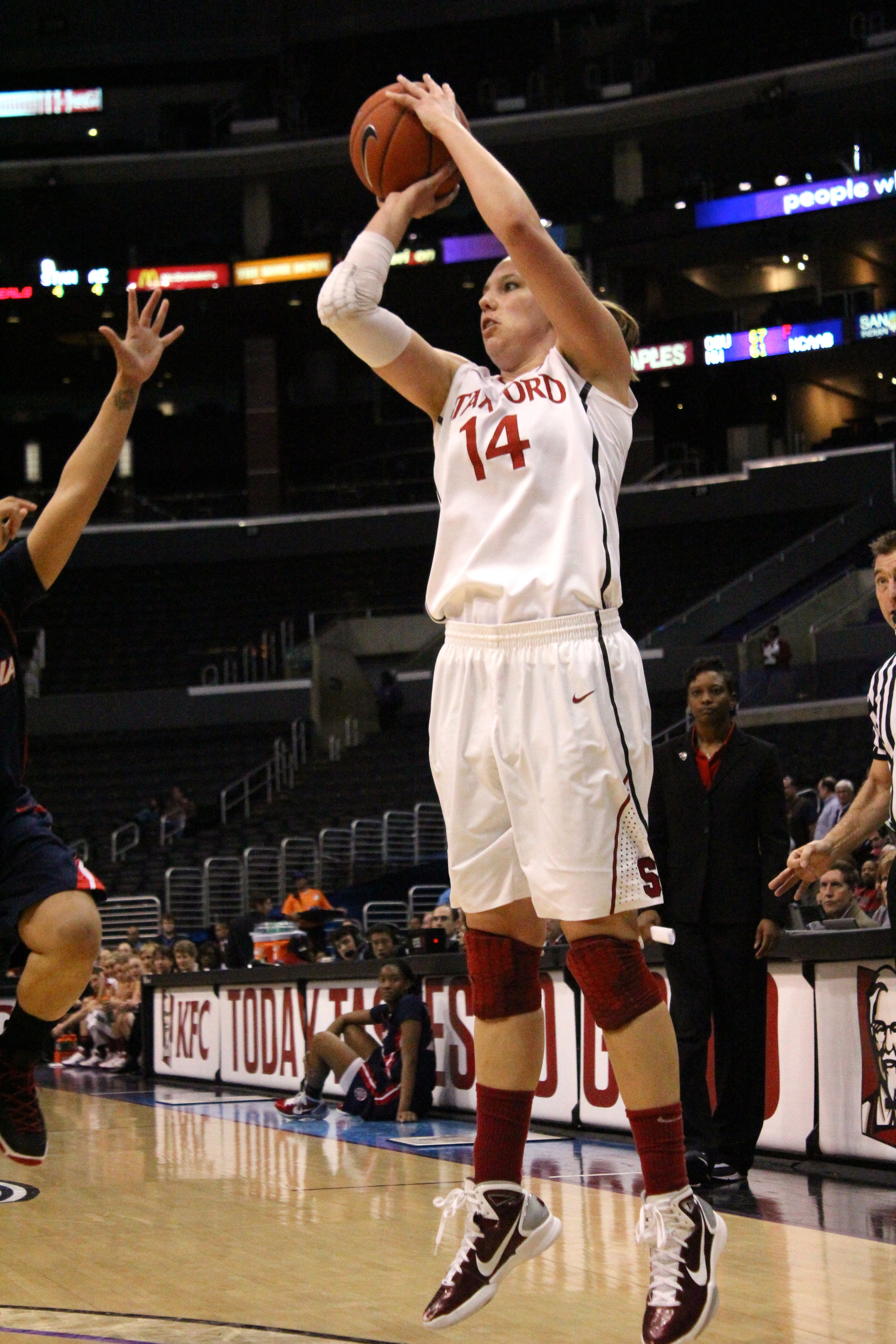

Free agent
- Position: Forward
- League: WNBA

Personal information
- Born: April 14, 1989 (age 37) Flint, Michigan, U.S.
- Listed height: 6 ft 4 in (1.93 m)
- Listed weight: 190 lb (86 kg)

Career information
- High school: Red Mountain (Mesa, Arizona)
- College: Stanford (2007–2011)
- WNBA draft: 2011: 1st round, 7th overall pick
- Drafted by: Tulsa Shock
- Playing career: 2011–present

Career history
- 2011–2013: Tulsa Shock
- 2013–2020: Connecticut Sun

Career highlights
- 2× All Pac-10 (2010, 2011); Second-team All Pac-10 (2009); Third-team All Pac-10 (2008); Pac-12 Tournament MOP (2009); Pac-10 Freshman of the Year (2008); Pac-10 All-Freshman Team (2008); McDonald's All-American (2007)
- Stats at WNBA.com
- Stats at Basketball Reference
Medals
Women's basketball
Representing the United States
World University Games
Gold medal – first place	2009 Belgrade	Team
FIBA Under-19 World Cup
Gold medal – first place	2007 Slovakia	Team
FIBA Under-18 Americas Championship
Gold medal – first place	2006 United States	Team

Kayla Danielle Pedersen (born April 14, 1989) is an American basketball forward who is currently a free agent. She was selected 7th overall in the 2011 WNBA draft. She was selected for the 2006 State Farm Holiday Classic all-tournament as a senior at Red Mountain High School in Arizona. After attending high school she went to Stanford University, where she had a highly successful career. She has a brother who is younger "Kyle Pedersen" who is a successful Science teacher at Gilbert HighSchool.

== Career ==
=== High school ===
Pedersen went to Red Mountain High School in Mesa, Arizona. She led her team to a 5A-DI state title as a senior. She set records for 5A with 2,611 points, 1,444 rebounds, 434 assists and 304 blocks.

=== USA Basketball ===
Pedersen was a member of the USA Women's U18 team which won the gold medal at the FIBA Americas Championship in Colorado Springs, Colorado. The event was held in July 2006, when the USA team defeated Canada to win the championship. Pederson has 12 rebounds in the game against Brazil. She averaged 6.0 points per game over the course of the event.

Pedersen continued as a member of the USA Women's U19 team which won the gold medal at the FIBA U19 World Championship in Bratislava, Slovakia. The event was held in July and August 2007, when the USA team defeated Sweden to win the championship. She averaged 2.8 points per game.

Pedersen was named a member of the team representing the USA at the 2009 World University Games held in Belgrade, Serbia. The team won all seven games to earn the gold medal. Pedersen averaged 5.1 points per game, and was the team's third leading rebounder, with 6.4 per game.

In 2010, she led the NCAA in scoring, assists, and rebounds. She was a top 10 draft prospect.

=== Stanford ===
At Stanford, Pedersen was a huge contributor; Tara VanDerveer (the coach at Stanford) has complimented her many times. In her freshman year, the team reached the final four, Pedersen being a huge contributor, averaging 12.6 points per game. She also averaged 8.4 rebounds a game. She was named Pac-10 freshman of the year. She also set a Stanford freshman record by starting all 39 games. They eventually lost to UConn (Connecticut) in the final four, but Pedersen managed 17 points and 7 rebounds and received much praise from the fans. During her remaining years in college, the Cardinal reached the final four every single year, with Pedersen being a consistent stand-out contributor. UConn continued to be a huge barrier to success for them, but Stanford finally beat them on December 30, 2010. However, they then went on to lose in the final four to Texas A&M. Pedersen has set Stanford's career record in both games (150) and minutes played (4,762), and she is seventh in the all-time points list (1,941 points).

=== WNBA ===
Pedersen was selected 7th overall in the 2011 WNBA draft by Tulsa Shock. Former head coach, Nolan Richardson, once called her the "female Larry Bird-type player".

Pedersen was traded to the Connecticut Sun for a 2nd Round Pick in the 2014 WNBA draft on June 20, 2013.

== Career statistics ==
Legend
GP	Games played	GS	Games started	MPG	Minutes per game	RPG	Rebounds per game
APG	Assists per game	SPG	Steals per game	BPG	Blocks per game	PPG	Points per game
TO	Turnovers per game	FG%	Field-goal percentage	3P%	3-point field-goal percentage	FT%	Free-throw percentage
**Bold**	Career best	°	League leader

=== WNBA ===
==== Regular season ====
WNBA regular season statistics
Year	Team	GP	GS	MPG	FG%	3P%	FT%	RPG	APG	SPG	BPG	TO	PPG
2011	Tulsa	**33**	20	**23.8**	40.2	**32.4**	79.6	3.6	**1.8**	**1.1**	0.4	1.3	**6.8**
2012	Tulsa	27	**25**	23.2	29.7	25.0	59.0	**4.4**	1.6	1.0	0.5	1.3	4.2
2013	Tulsa	9	5	18.0	42.1	—	50.0	3.9	1.6	0.8	**0.9**	0.9	3.9
2013	Connecticut	25	0	10.8	36.5	0.0	71.4	2.6	0.7	0.6	0.2	0.8	2.6
2014	Connecticut	31	1	10.0	38.1	—	61.9	2.3	0.3	0.2	0.1	0.5	1.5
2015	Connecticut	**33**	1	15.5	**43.3**	—	**82.6**	2.6	1.2	0.7	0.2	0.6	2.9
2016	Did not play (personal-rest)												
2017	Connecticut	26	0	10.2	37.1	0.0	70.6	2.3	0.6	0.3	0.1	**0.4**	1.5
**Career**	7 years, 2 teams	184	52	15.9	37.6	30.5	70.7	3.0	1.1	0.6	0.3	0.8	3.4

==== Playoffs ====
WNBA playoff statistics
Year	Team	GP	GS	MPG	FG%	3P%	FT%	RPG	APG	SPG	BPG	TO	PPG
2017	Connecticut	1	0	5.0	100.0	—	50.0	0.0	0.0	0.0	0.0	0.0	3.0
**Career**	1 year, 1 team	1	0	5.0	100.0	—	50.0	0.0	0.0	0.0	0.0	0.0	3.0

=== College ===
NCAA statistics
Year	Team	GP	Points	FG%	3P%	FT%	RPG	APG	SPG	BPG	PPG
2007–08	Stanford	**39**	492	**49.7**	**35.5**	71.3	8.4	1.6	0.8	0.6	12.6
2008–09	Stanford	38	410	43.3	34.0	67.3	7.8	2.2	0.9	0.6	10.8
2009–10	Stanford	38	**599**	45.9	37.7	**82.3**	**9.5**	2.7	0.6	0.4	**15.8**
2010–11	Stanford	35	440	46.6	26.2	78.3	8.0	**3.5**	**1.0**	**0.8**	12.6
**Career**		150	1941	46.4	33.3	75.7	8.4	2.5	0.8	0.6	12.9

== Personal ==
Pedersen was born in Flint, Michigan, on April 14, 1989, to Kelli and Gary Pedersen. Her father played basketball at Saint Mary's in California. Her family later moved to Fountain Hills, Arizona, when she was six years old, where she still resides. She has one younger brother, Kyle.
