= Porsha Phillips =

American basketball player

Personal information
- Born: January 13, 1988 (age 38) Stone Mountain, Georgia, U.S.
- Listed height: 6 ft 0 in (1.83 m)
- Listed weight: 173 lb (78 kg)

Career information
- High school: Redan (Stone Mountain, Georgia)
- College: LSU (2006–2007); Georgia (2008–2011)
- WNBA draft: 2011: 3rd round, 30th overall pick
- Drafted by: San Antonio Silver Stars
- Playing career: 2011–2012
- Position: Forward

Career history
- 2011: San Antonio Silver Stars

Career highlights
- First-team All-SEC (2011); McDonald's All-American (2006)
- Stats at WNBA.com
- Stats at Basketball Reference

Porsha Phillips (born January 13, 1988) is an American professional women's basketball player, formerly with the San Antonio Silver Stars of the Women's National Basketball Association (WNBA). Porsha Phillips finished her basketball career in Israel, playing for Ramat Hasharon Club.

== Early life and education ==
Phillips attended Redan High School in Stone Mountain, Georgia and graduated 2006. While at Redan, Phillips averaged 18.8 points, 5.3 rebounds and 3.8 blocked shots as a senior to earn elite status as a Women's Basketball Coaches Association (WBCA), USA Today, Parade and McDonald's All-American honors. Phillips led Redan to a 104–27 record, including two state runner-up finishes. She posted 1,624 points and 837 rebounds during her career as well.

Phillips, a three-time DeKalb County Player of the Year, was ranked as the eighth overall recruit in the country by Blue Star Girls Report and 15th overall, and the second highest ranked forward by Roundball Journal.

== College career ==
Phillips attended Louisiana State University before transferring to the University of Georgia

== Professional career ==
Phillips was selected in the third round of the 2011 WNBA draft (30th overall) by the San Antonio Silver Stars.

== Career statistics ==
Legend
GP	Games played	GS	Games started	MPG	Minutes per game	RPG	Rebounds per game
APG	Assists per game	SPG	Steals per game	BPG	Blocks per game	PPG	Points per game
TO	Turnovers per game	FG%	Field-goal percentage	3P%	3-point field-goal percentage	FT%	Free-throw percentage
**Bold**	Career best	°	League leader

=== WNBA ===
==== Regular season ====
WNBA regular season statistics
Year	Team	GP	GS	MPG	FG%	3P%	FT%	RPG	APG	SPG	BPG	TO	PPG
2011	San Antonio	31	1	8.3	39.0	—	47.4	1.9	0.3	0.2	0.4	0.3	1.8
**Career**	1 year, 1 team	31	1	8.3	39.0	—	47.4	1.9	0.3	0.2	0.4	0.3	1.8

=== College ===
NCAA statistics
Year	Team	GP	Points	FG%	3P%	FT%	RPG	APG	SPG	BPG	PPG
2006–07	LSU	**38**	143	32.0	15.6	66.7	2.9	0.7	0.7	0.9	3.8
2008–09	Georgia	32	335	**45.1**	**25.0**	75.0	6.1	1.4	1.3	1.2	10.5
2009–10	Georgia	34	295	36.5	16.7	64.4	8.2	0.9	1.3	**1.6**	8.7
2010–11	Georgia	34	**366**	39.6	23.5	**80.7**	**10.7**	**1.6**	**1.4**	1.5	**10.8**
**Career**		138	1139	38.9	19.1	73.1	6.9	1.1	1.2	1.3	8.3

== Personal life ==
Her brother is former Boston Red Sox second baseman, Brandon Phillips.
