= 2006 McDonald's All-American Girls Game =

East	West
76	80
	1st half	2nd half	Total
East	34	42	76
West	31	49	80
- Date: March 29, 2006
- Venue: Cox Arena, San Diego, California
- MVP: Jayne Appel
- Referees: Jody Carper; Rob Bryson; Linda Powell
- Attendance: 11,900
- Network: ESPN

McDonald's All-American

The 2006 McDonald's All-American Girls Game was an All-star basketball game played on Wednesday, March 29, 2006, at Cox Arena in San Diego, California, home of the San Diego State Aztecs. The game's rosters featured the best and most highly recruited high school girls graduating in 2006. The game was the 5th annual version of the McDonald's All-American Game first played in 2002.

The 48 players were selected from 2,500 nominees by a committee of basketball experts. They were chosen not only for their on-court skills, but for their performances off the court as well. Coach Morgan Wootten, who had more than 1,200 wins as head basketball coach at DeMatha High School, was chairman of the selection committee. Legendary UCLA coach John Wooden, who has been involved in the McDonald's All American Games since its inception, served as chairman of the Games and as an advisor to the selection committee.

Proceeds from the 2006 McDonald's All American High School Basketball Games went to Ronald McDonald House Charities (RMHC) of San Diego and its Ronald McDonald House program.

== 2006 Game ==
The game was telecast live by ESPN. Fans swarmed San Diego State's Cox Arena for the 2006 edition of the McDonald's All American Games. A sold-out crowd of 11,900 was treated to a tightly contested first game, as the Girls game kicked off the action.

Morgan Wooten Player of the Year award recipient and East Team superstar Tina Charles (Connecticut) turned in a strong performance with 12 points and nine rebounds. But the night's star and John R. Wooden Most Valuable Player of the Game was the West Team's Jayne Appel (Stanford) with 12 points, seven rebounds and a great all-around performance. Dymond Simon (Arizona State) added a great offensive performance with her game high 14 points, while Amanda Thompson (Oklahoma) led the way defensively with five blocked shots. The West Team was coached by Wade Vickery of Santana High School (Santee, CA) and the East Team was headed by coaching legend Leta Andrews of Granbury High School (Granbury, TX) who became the all-time winningest girls coach in 2006.

The 2006 edition of the Girls game went down to the wire and the 80–76 margin makes it the closest contest to date. After trailing at the half, the West team put together a strong second half performance to pull out another victory, as they led the series 4–1.

=== 2006 East Roster ===
#	Name	Height	Weight (lbs.)	Position	Hometown	High School	College Choice
3	Kaili McLaren	6-3	235	F	Washington, DC, U.S.	Good Counsel	Connecticut
11	Danielle Wilson	6-3	175	C	Bay Shore, NY, U.S.	St. John the Baptist	Baylor
13	Epiphanny Prince	5-9	155	G	Brooklyn, NY, U.S.	Bergtraum	Rutgers
15	Bridgette Mitchell	6-0	170	F	Trenton, NJ, U.S.	Peddie School	Duke
20	Monica Wright	5-11	156	G	Woodbridge, VA, U.S.	Forest Park	Virginia
21	Porsha Phillips	6-1	155	F	Stone Mountain, GA, U.S.	Redan	LSU
22	Ashley Houts	5-6	140	G	Trenton, GA, U.S.	Dade County	Georgia
24	Amber White	5-7	160	G	Coatesville, PA, U.S.	Coatesville	North Carolina State
30	Joy Cheek	6-1	180	F	Charlotte, NC, U.S.	South Mecklenburg	Duke
31	Tina Charles	6-4	185	F	Jamaica, NY, U.S.	Christ The King	Connecticut
42	Amber Harris	6-5	170	F/C	Indianapolis, IN, U.S.	Indianapolis North Central	Purdue (Note: Although Harris committed to Purdue, she never played there. She was released from her letter of intent, and transferred to Xavier. After sitting out the 2006–07 season, she played four seasons at Xavier, finishing her college career in 2011.)
51	Jessica Breland	6-3	160	F	Kelford, NC, U.S.	Bertie	North Carolina

=== 2006 West Roster ===
#	Name	Height	Weight (lbs.)	Position	Hometown	High School	College Choice
1	Dymond Simon	5-5	125	G	Avondale, AZ, U.S.	Phoenix St. Mary's	Arizona State
3	Jayne Appel	6-4	180	F/C	Pleasant Hill, CA, U.S.	Carondelet	Stanford
5	Michelle Harrison	6-2	170	F	Orem, UT, U.S.	Mountain View	Stanford
10	Brittainey Raven	6-0	153	G	Fort Worth, TX, U.S.	North Crowley	Texas
12	Jacki Gemelos	6-0	168	F	Stockton, CA, U.S.	Stockton St. Mary's	USC
13	Jordan Murphree	6-0	150	F	Weatherford, TX, U.S.	Brock	Texas Tech
21	Amanda Thompson	6-0	165	F	Chicago, IL, U.S.	Whitney Young	Oklahoma
22	Allison Hightower	5-11	140	G	Arlington, TX, U.S.	Seguin	LSU
24	Dela Quese Jernigan	6-0	162	F	East Chicago, IN, U.S.	East Chicago	Purdue
30	Adrian McGowen	5-11	190	G	Goodrich, TX, U.S.	Goodrich	Texas A&M
34	Abi Olajuwon	6-3	200	F/C	Sherman Oaks, CA, U.S.	Marlborough School	Oklahoma
55	Morghan Medlock	6-0	170	G/F	Hawthorne, CA, U.S.	Narbonne	USC

=== Coaches ===
The East team was coached by:

- Head Coach Leta Andrews of Granbury High School (Granbury, Texas)
- Asst Coach Shelley Rains of Country Day School (Fort Worth, Texas)
- Asst Coach Dianna Reynolds Sager of Colleyville Heritage High School (Colleyville, Texas)

The West team was coached by:

- Head Coach Wade Vickery of Santana High School (Santee, California)
- Asst Coach Jim Mottershaw of Santana High School (Santee, California)
- Asst Coach Peggy Brose of Rancho Bernardo High School (San Diego, California)

=== Boxscore ===
==== Visitors: East ====
##	Player	FGM/A	3PM/A	FTM/A	Points	Off Reb	Def Reb	Tot Reb	PF	Ast	TO	BS	ST	Min
20	*Monica Wright	5/10	2/ 3	1/ 2	13	1	2	3	0	0	0	0	8	21
22	*Ashley Houts	3/ 8	1/ 3	4/ 6	11	0	3	3	1	3	4	0	0	22
30	*Joy Cheek	1/ 5	0/ 1	1/ 2	3	3	3	6	3	2	4	1	1	22
31	*Tina Charles	5/10	0/ 0	2/ 4	12	2	7	9	0	1	3	1	1	22
51	*Jessica Breland	1/ 5	0/ 1	0/ 0	2	3	2	5	1	1	2	3	2	14
3	Kaili McLaren	3/ 7	2/ 2	1/ 2	9	1	2	3	2	1	0	1	0	11
11	Danielle Wilson	1/ 3	0/ 0	0/ 0	2	2	0	2	1	1	3	0	0	15
13	Epiphanny Prince	1/ 4	0/ 1	0/ 0	2	1	1	2	2	1	1	0	2	12
15	Bridgette Mitchell	1/ 8	0/ 1	1/ 2	3	1	4	5	3	3	0	0	0	14
21	Porsha Phillips	3/ 7	0/ 0	1/ 2	7	2	2	4	2	2	0	2	0	17
24	Amber White	3/ 7	0/ 0	4/ 4	10	1	1	2	2	2	0	0	1	18
42	Amber Harris	1/ 5	0/ 0	0/ 4	2	1	0	1	1	0	1	3	1	12
	Team					2	2	4						
	TOTALS	28/79	5/12	15/28	76	20	29	49	18	17	18	11	16	200

==== Home: West ====
##	Player	FGM/A	3PM/A	FTM/A	Points	Off Reb	Def Reb	Tot Reb	PF	Ast	TO	BS	ST	Min
3	*Jayne Appel	5/ 7	0/ 1	2/ 2	12	1	6	7	2	0	1	2	2	20
10	*Brittainey Raven	4/ 9	0/ 3	0/ 1	8	2	3	5	2	3	3	0	0	21
13	*Jordan Murphree	0/ 4	0/ 3	1/ 2	1	2	4	6	1	4	8	0	1	15
22	*Allison Hightower	3/ 9	2/ 5	1/ 2	9	3	6	9	2	2	2	2	4	24
55	*Morghan Medlock	2/ 8	0/ 1	3/ 5	7	1	3	4	1	1	2	1	1	14
1	Dymond Simon	5/12	2/ 4	2/ 2	14	1	0	1	1	3	3	0	1	23
5	Michelle Harrison	1/ 6	1/ 4	2/ 2	5	2	0	2	2	0	0	1	1	15
21	Amanda Thompson	4/ 8	0/ 0	3/ 4	11	4	5	9	2	4	1	5	2	23
24	Dela Quese Jernigan	2/ 8	1/ 3	0/ 0	5	3	4	7	3	0	4	1	1	15
30	Adrian McGowen	0/ 2	0/ 1	0/ 0	0	1	2	3	0	1	2	1	0	15
34	Abi Olajuwon	3/ 8	0/ 0	2/ 2	8	2	3	5	2	1	1	0	1	15
	Team					6	2	8						
	TOTALS	29/81	6/25	16/22	80	28	38	66	18	19	27	13	14	200

(* = Starting Line-up)

== All-American Week ==
=== Schedule ===
- Monday, March 27: Powerade JamFest
  - Three-Point Shoot-out
  - Timed Basketball Skills Competition
- Wednesday, March 29: 5th Annual Girls All-American Game

The Powerade JamFest is a skills-competition evening featuring basketball players who demonstrate their skills in two crowd-entertaining ways. Since the first All-American game in 2002, players have competed in a 3-point shooting challenge and a timed basketball skills competition.

=== Contest Winners ===
- Allison Hightower was winner of the 2006 3-point shoot-out.
- The skills competition was won by Michelle Harrison.

== See also ==
- 2006 McDonald's All-American Boys Game
