= Jayne Appel =

American basketball player (born 1988)

Jayne Appel-Marinelli
Personal information
- Born: May 14, 1988 (age 38) Berkeley, California, U.S.
- Listed height: 6 ft 4 in (1.93 m)
- Listed weight: 210 lb (95 kg)

Career information
- High school: Carondelet (Concord, California)
- College: Stanford (2006–2010)
- WNBA draft: 2010: 1st round, 5th overall pick
- Drafted by: San Antonio Silver Stars
- Playing career: 2010–2016
- Position: Center
- Number: 32

Career history
- 2010–2016: San Antonio Stars

Career highlights
- 2× All-American – State Farm Coaches', USBWA (2009, 2010); 2× Second-team All-American – AP (2009, 2010); Pac-10 Player of the Year (2009); 3× First-team All Pac-10 (2008–2010); Pac-10 Freshman of the Year (2007); Pac-10 All-Freshman Team (2007); McDonald's All-American Game MVP (2006)
- Stats at WNBA.com
- Stats at Basketball Reference
Medals
Women's basketball
Representing USA
World Championship
| Gold medal – first place | 2010 Czech Rep. | National Team |
Pan American Games
| Gold medal – first place | 2007 Brazil | Team |
FIBA Under-18 Americas Championship
| Gold medal – first place | 2006 United States | Team |

Jayne Appel-Marinelli (born May 14, 1988) is an American former basketball center who played for the San Antonio Stars of the Women's National Basketball Association (WNBA) in 2016. She played collegiate basketball at Stanford University.

== Early life ==
Born in Berkeley, California, Jayne has two older brothers, Mike and Tommy, and one younger brother, Nate. Jayne's father, Joseph Appel, played basketball at Saint Mary's College of California.

Appel was a four-time letter winner in basketball at Carondelet High School in Concord, California. She was also a three-year letter winner in water polo.

As a senior, Appel was a McDonald's All-American as a senior and named MVP of the All-American game. She was named Gatorade State Player of the Year in basketball, rated as the 3rd best in the high school class of 2006 by hsgirlshoop.scout.com and named a WBCA All-American. She played for the U18 women's national team at the FIBA Americas.

She was offered scholarships by Connecticut, Tennessee, Duke, USC, UCLA, and Stanford, eventually accepting Stanford's offer.

== College career ==
As a freshman at Stanford Appel averaged 13.2 ppg and 7.5 rpg off the bench. She was named the 2007 Pac-10 conference freshman of the year. As a sophomore, she averaged 15.0 ppg and 8.8 rpg. She scored 16 points and pulled down 5 boards in the 2008 national championship against Tennessee, which Stanford lost 64–48. Appel was named first team All-Pac-10 after the season.

Appel scored a career high 46 points against Iowa State on March 30, 2009, which is the third-highest mark in NCAA tournament history.

Appel became the leading rebounder in Pac-10 history on February 27, 2010, surpassing Lisa Leslie's record of 1,214 career rebounds.

Appel suffered a sprained ankle and a stress fracture in her right foot during Stanford's first-round game of the 2010 NCAA tournament on March 20. She continued to play, keeping the extent of her injury secret until the day of the WNBA draft. Stanford advanced to the Final Four, ultimately losing to Connecticut to finish the season 36–2.

== USA Basketball ==
Appel played for the USA 2006 U18 team in Colorado. The team won all four games, earning the gold medal and qualifying for the U19 World Championship.

Appel played for the USA team in the 2007 Pan American Games in Rio de Janeiro, Brazil. The team won all five games, earning the gold medal for the event.

Appel was invited to the USA Basketball Women's National Team training camp in the fall of 2009, one of only three college players to be invited. The team selected to play for the 2010 FIBA World Championship and the 2012 Olympics is usually chosen from these participants.

Appel was selected to be a member of the National team representing the US at the World Championships held in September and October 2010. The team was coached by Geno Auriemma. Because many team members were still playing in the WNBA until just prior to the event, the team had only one day of practice with the entire team before leaving for Ostrava and Karlovy Vary, Czech Republic. Even with limited practice, the team won its first games against Greece by 26 points. The team continued to dominate with victory margins exceeding 20 points in the first five games. Several players shared scoring honors, with Swin Cash, Angel McCoughtry, Maya Moore, Diana Taurasi, Lindsay Whalen, and Sylvia Fowles all ending as high scorer in the first few games. The sixth game was against undefeated Australia — the USA jumped out to a 24-point lead and the USA prevailed 83–75. The USA won its next two games by over 30 points, then faced the host team, the Czech Republic, in the championship game. The USA team had only a five-point lead at halftime, which was cut to three points, but the Czechs never got closer. Team USA went on to win the championship and gold medal. Appel averaged 1.8 points per game.

Appell was one of 21 finalists for the U.S. Women's Olympic Basketball Team Roster. The 20 professional women's basketball players, plus one collegiate player (Brittney Griner), were selected by the USA Basketball Women's National Team Player Selection Committee to compete for the final roster which will represent the US at the 2012 Olympics in London.

== WNBA career ==
Appel was chosen by the San Antonio Silver Stars in the first round of the 2010 WNBA draft.

== Career statistics ==
Legend
| GP | Games played | GS | Games started | MPG | Minutes per game | RPG | Rebounds per game |
| APG | Assists per game | SPG | Steals per game | BPG | Blocks per game | PPG | Points per game |
| TO | Turnovers per game | FG% | Field-goal percentage | 3P% | 3-point field-goal percentage | FT% | Free-throw percentage |
| **Bold** | Career best | ° | League leader |

=== WNBA ===
==== Regular season ====
| Year | Team | GP | GS | MPG | FG% | 3P% | FT% | RPG | APG | SPG | BPG | TO | PPG |
|---|---|---|---|---|---|---|---|---|---|---|---|---|---|
| 2010 | San Antonio | 28 | 0 | 10.9 | 53.5 | 33.3 | 55.9 | 2.5 | 0.5 | 0.3 | 0.2 | **0.7** | 3.4 |
| 2011 | San Antonio | 31 | 0 | 14.6 | 47.2 | 33.3 | 56.0 | 4.6 | 0.8 | 0.5 | 0.6 | **0.7** | 3.2 |
| 2012 | San Antonio | 33 | 30 | 18.9 | 55.3 | 0.0 | **75.9** | 6.5 | 1.2 | 0.5 | 0.9 | 1.2 | 3.5 |
| 2013 | San Antonio | 29 | 29 | **26.5** | **57.9** | 33.3 | 59.2 | **8.9** | 2.0 | **0.9** | **1.3** | 1.5 | **5.9** |
| 2014 | San Antonio | **34** | **34** | 24.8 | 53.8 | **100.0** | 60.5 | 7.9 | **2.1** | 0.5 | 0.9 | 1.4 | 4.9 |
| 2015 | San Antonio | 30 | 28 | 22.4 | 38.2 | 0.0 | 64.7 | 6.2 | 1.4 | 0.8 | **1.3** | 1.3 | 3.3 |
| 2016 | San Antonio | **34** | **34** | 23.1 | 42.9 | 0.0 | 73.5 | 5.4 | 2.1 | **0.9** | 1.0 | 1.6 | 4.1 |
| Career | 7 years, 1 team | 219 | 155 | 20.3 | 49.8 | 21.1 | 63.9 | 6.1 | 1.5 | 0.6 | 0.9 | 1.2 | 4.0 |

==== Playoffs ====
| Year | Team | GP | GS | MPG | FG% | 3P% | FT% | RPG | APG | SPG | BPG | TO | PPG |
|---|---|---|---|---|---|---|---|---|---|---|---|---|---|
| 2010 | San Antonio | 2 | 0 | 12.0 | 50.0 | 0.0 | **75.0** | 3.5 | 1.0 | 0.0 | 0.0 | **0.0** | **5.5** |
| 2011 | San Antonio | **3** | 0 | 8.0 | 0.0 | 0.0 | 0.0 | 0.7 | 0.3 | **0.7** | 0.0 | 1.3 | 0.0 |
| 2012 | San Antonio | 2 | **2** | 13.0 | **66.7** | 0.0 | 0.0 | 4.5 | 1.0 | 0.0 | **0.5** | 1.0 | 2.0 |
| 2014 | San Antonio | 2 | **2** | **19.5** | 0.0 | 0.0 | 0.0 | **5.5** | **2.0** | 0.5 | 0.0 | 1.0 | 0.0 |
| Career | 4 years, 1 team | 9 | 4 | 12.6 | 35.3 | 0.0 | 75.0 | 3.2 | 1.0 | 0.3 | 0.1 | 0.9 | 1.7 |

=== College ===
| Year | Team | GP | Points | FG% | 3P% | FT% | RPG | APG | SPG | BPG | PPG |
|---|---|---|---|---|---|---|---|---|---|---|---|
| 2006–07 | Stanford | 33 | 436 | 53.8 | - | 64.5 | 7.5 | 1.0 | 0.8 | 1.8 | 13.2 |
| 2007–08 | Stanford | **39** | 586 | 58.8 | - | **70.6** | 8.8 | 2.8 | **0.9** | **2.2** | 15.0 |
| 2008–09 | Stanford | 38 | **613** | **60.2** | - | 65.3 | **9.2** | 2.8 | 0.7 | 1.8 | **16.1** |
| 2009–10 | Stanford | 37 | 490 | 52.1 | - | 62.8 | 8.7 | 2.5 | 0.7 | 1.6 | 13.2 |
| Career | Stanford | 147 | 2125 | 56.5 | 0.0 | 65.6 | 8.6 | 2.3 | 0.7 | 1.9 | 14.5 |
