= Chastity Reed =

American basketball player

Little Rock Trojans
- Title: Assistant coach
- League: Ohio Valley Conference

Personal information
- Born: March 28, 1989 (age 37) New Orleans, Louisiana

Career information
- High school: MacArthur (Irving, Texas)
- College: Arkansas–Little Rock (2007–2011)
- WNBA draft: 2011: 3rd round, 25th overall pick
- Drafted by: Tulsa Shock
- Playing career: 2011–2023
- Position: Power forward
- Coaching career: 2024–present

Career history

Playing
- 2011: Tulsa Shock
- 2011–2012: Hapoel Petah Tikva
- 2012–2013: Elitzur Netanya
- 2013–2014: CSU Alba Iulia
- 2014–2015: Kibrkstis Vici Vilnius
- 2015: Warrandyte Venom
- 2015–2016: Flying Foxes Post SV Wien
- 2016: Beroe Stara Zagora
- 2016–2017: CSM Satu Mare
- 2018: Colegio los Leones
- 2019–2023: Panathinaikos

Coaching
- 2024–present: Little Rock (assistant)

Career highlights
- As player: Greek National League champion (2021); Greek Women's Basketball Cup(2023); Sun Belt Player of the Year (2011); Sun Belt Tournament MVP (2011)3x First-team All-Sun Belt (2009–2011)
- Stats at WNBA.com
- Stats at Basketball Reference

Chastity Reed (born March 28, 1989), is an American former professional basketball player, and is currently an assistant coach for her alma mater, Little Rock women's basketball team.

== Professional career ==
=== WNBA ===
Reed was selected in the third round of the 2011 WNBA draft (25th overall) by the Tulsa Shock. Reed was with the Shock for thirteen games, playing in eleven, including one start, before being waived by interim coach and GM, Teresa Edwards.

For the 2012 WNBA season, Reed was to the training camp of the Phoenix Mercury.

== Coaching career ==
On August 29, 2024, it was announced that Reed would be returning to her alma mater, Little Rock, as an assistant coach.

== Career statistics ==
Legend
GP	Games played	GS	Games started	MPG	Minutes per game	RPG	Rebounds per game
APG	Assists per game	SPG	Steals per game	BPG	Blocks per game	PPG	Points per game
TO	Turnovers per game	FG%	Field-goal percentage	3P%	3-point field-goal percentage	FT%	Free-throw percentage
**Bold**	Career best	°	League leader

=== WNBA ===
WNBA regular season statistics
Year	Team	GP	GS	MPG	FG%	3P%	FT%	RPG	APG	SPG	BPG	TO	PPG
2011	Tulsa	11	1	13.2	37.0	0.0	66.7	1.9	0.7	0.3	0.1	1.1	3.5
**Career**	1 year, 1 team	11	1	13.2	37.0	0.0	66.7	1.9	0.7	0.3	0.1	1.1	3.5

=== College ===
NCAA statistics
Year	Team	GP	Points	FG%	3P%	FT%	RPG	APG	SPG	BPG	PPG
2007–08	Arkansas–Little Rock	32	218	43.9	25.0	65.6	6.3	1.7	1.5	0.4	6.8
2008–09	Arkansas–Little Rock	32	579	**46.4**	18.2	**78.1**	7.8	2.8	**2.1**	**0.8**	18.1
2009–10	Arkansas–Little Rock	**34**	**842**	45.8	–	76.1	7.8	2.4	2.0	0.7	**24.8**
2010–11	Arkansas–Little Rock	29	568	43.4	**31.0**	70.1	6.2	**3.1**	1.9	0.7	19.6
**Career**		127	2207	45.1	25.5	74.5	7.1	2.5	1.9	0.7	17.4
