= Danielle Adams =

American basketball player (born 1989)

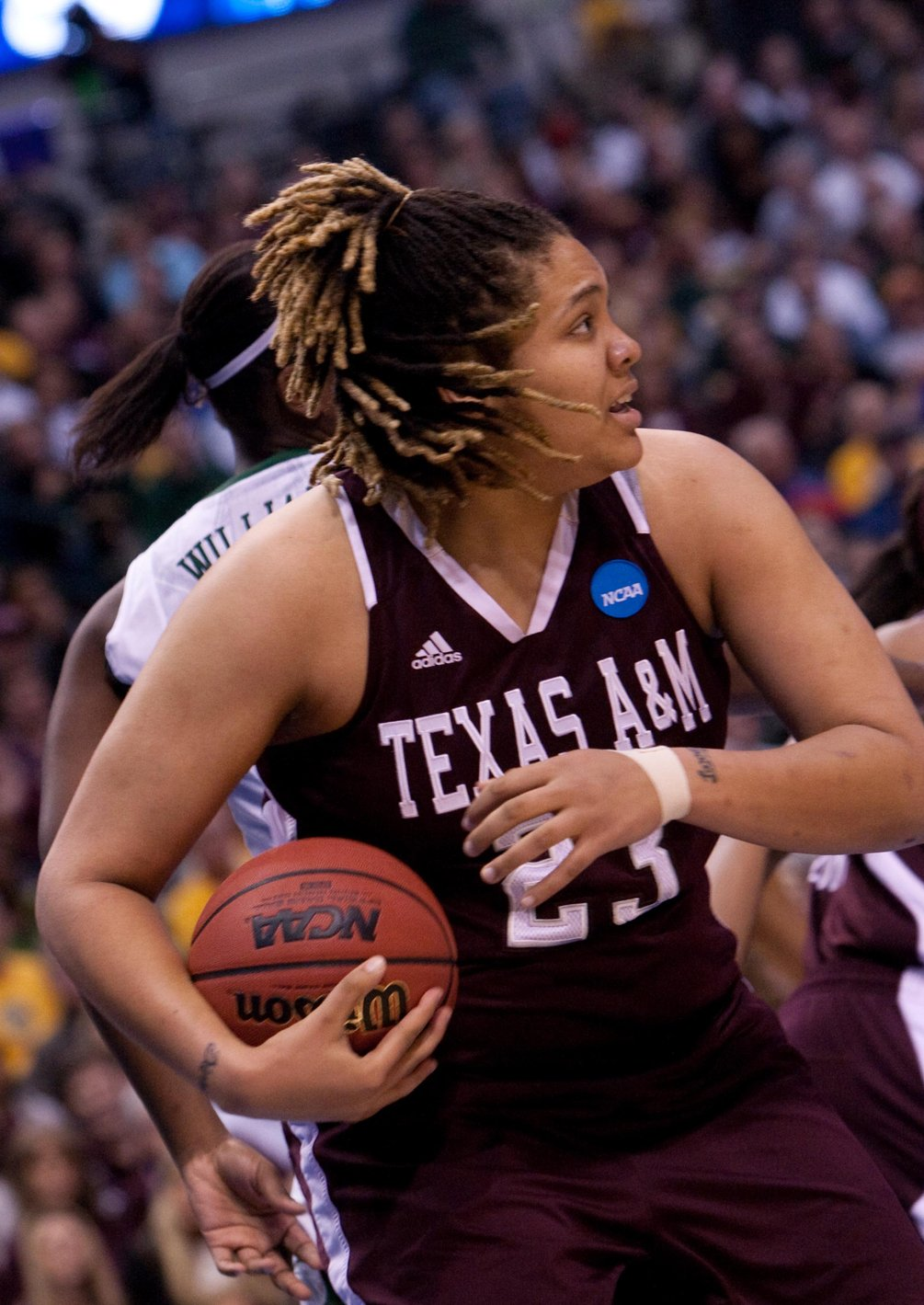
- Adams with Texas A&M in 2011

Personal information
- Born: February 19, 1989 (age 37) Kansas City, Missouri, U.S.
- Listed height: 6 ft 1 in (1.85 m)
- Listed weight: 239 lb (108 kg)

Career information
- High school: Lee's Summit (Lee's Summit, Missouri)
- College: Jefferson (2007–2009); Texas A&M (2009–2011)
- WNBA draft: 2011: 2nd round, 20th overall pick
- Drafted by: San Antonio Silver Stars
- Playing career: 2011–2020
- Position: Power forward / center
- Number: 23, 11

Career history
- 2011–2015: San Antonio Stars / Silver Stars
- 2011–2012: GMO Pozzouli
- 2011–2014: Maccabi Bnot Ashdod
- 2014–2016: CJM Bourges Basket
- 2016–2017: Maccabi Bnot Ramat Gan
- 2017–2020: Connecticut Sun

Career highlights
- WNBA All-Star (2011); WNBA All-Rookie Team (2011); NCAA champion (2011); NCAA Tournament MOP (2011); All-American – State Farm, USBWA (2011); First-team All-American – AP (2011); Big 12 Tournament Most Outstanding Player (2010); First-team All-Big 12 (2011); WBCA Junior College Player of the Year (2009)
- Stats at WNBA.com
- Stats at Basketball Reference

Danielle E'Shawn Adams (born February 19, 1989) is an American former professional basketball forward-center who played in the Women's National Basketball Association (WNBA). She played college basketball at Texas A&M. She is the first Texas A&M player to be named an Associated Press first-team All-American. She also captured first team All-American honors from the WBCA. She was the Most Outstanding Player in the 2011 NCAA Division I women's basketball tournament championship, scoring 30 points. The 30 points rank second in NCAA Championship Game history.

== College career ==
Born in Kansas City, Missouri, Adams began her college career at Jefferson College. She earned Junior College All-American honors both years at the school, and as a sophomore, led her team to a runner-up finish at the NJCAA DI Women's Basketball Championship and a 34–1 record. Following the completion of her sophomore year at the two-year school, she contemplated where to play the next two years. Two of the schools she considered were Louisville and Texas A&M. Although her coach recommended Louisville, she decided that Texas A&M would be a better choice to prepare her for the future.

She came into A&M weighing 280 pounds. With support from the coaching staff, including conditioning coach Jen Jones, she slimmed down to 230 pounds her senior year. As a result, she was able to play "longer and harder" which helped her to become a first team All-American. In her junior year, she came off the bench and played just over 23 minutes per game. As a senior, she started, and was able to play 35 minutes per game.

To get to the Final Four, Adams would have to help her team beat Baylor, a task that has been difficult recently. Baylor beat Texas A&M in both regular season meetings, and in the Big Twelve conference tournament game. In that game, Texas A&M held a lead late, but could not hold on to win. In the Dallas regional Final, Texas A&M pulled out to a large lead, and was leading by 16 points almost halfway through the second half, when Baylor tried to mount a comeback. Baylor cut the margin to seven points, but could not get any closer, and Texas A&M went on to win the first game in their last nine meetings, and move on to the Final Four.

In the National Championship game against Notre Dame, the Irish were leading at halftime by two points, but extended the lead with a 7–3 run to start the second half. During a media time out the Texas A&M coaching staff told Adams to go inside. She ended up scoring 30 points, second most in NCAA Championship history and earning the award for Most Outstanding Player. She is only the second player, after Sheryl Swoopes to come from the junior college ranks and go on to win a Most Outstanding Player award. Swoopes is also the only player to score more than Adams in a title game. After scoring only eight points in the first half, she scored ten consecutive points by herself in the second half, as part of a 15–5 run that gave the Aggies the lead. Notre Dame would tie the game later, but Adams responded with two consecutive baskets to give her team a lead it would never relinquish.

== Professional career ==
Adams was selected in the second round of the 2011 WNBA draft (20th overall) by the San Antonio Silver Stars. On June 11, 2011, she scored 32 points against the Atlanta Dream, setting the franchise's rookie record. She was also named the Rookie of the Month for the month of June.

Adams was named as a reserve to the roster of the All-Star team for the 2011 WNBA All-Star game, along with Silver Stars teammate Becky Hammon. The reserves were selected by the twelve head coaches of the WNBA teams; each coach is not permitted to vote for their own players. At the time of the decision, Adams was the leading scorer among rookies in the league, with a scoring average of 15.6 points per game. She also received more write-in votes than any other player. Adams was one of four rookies on the All-Star team, the other three being Maya Moore, Courtney Vandersloot and Liz Cambage.

Adams was suspended on July 29, 2015, by the WNBA for three games without pay due to violation of the league's Anti-Drug Policy for unspecified charges. Adams admitted she was guilty and apologized to her teammates and the community. She was waived by the San Antonio Stars in April 2016.

In February 2017, Adams signed a training camp contract with the Connecticut Sun. In April 2017, she made the final roster for the team.

== Career statistics ==
=== WNBA ===
Legend
GP	Games played	GS	Games started	MPG	Minutes per game	RPG	Rebounds per game
APG	Assists per game	SPG	Steals per game	BPG	Blocks per game	PPG	Points per game
TO	Turnovers per game	FG%	Field-goal percentage	3P%	3-point field-goal percentage	FT%	Free-throw percentage
**Bold**	Career best	°	League leader

*	Denotes season(s) in which Adams won an NCAA Championship

==== Regular season ====
WNBA regular season statistics
Year	Team	GP	GS	MPG	FG%	3P%	FT%	RPG	APG	SPG	BPG	TO	PPG
2011	San Antonio	23	0	20.9	43.0	35.0	74.6	4.3	0.6	0.5	**0.7**	1.2	12.4
2012	San Antonio	**34**	5	20.2	**44.1**	33.9	**75.9**	**4.7**	1.0	0.7	**0.7**	1.2	11.8
2013	San Antonio	**34**	**24**	**26.4**	42.6	32.6	70.7	**4.7**	**1.2**	**0.9**	**0.7**	1.8	**14.4**
2014	San Antonio	**34**	14	20.6	40.7	30.7	79.7	4.1	0.9	0.6	**0.7**	1.3	10.9
2015	San Antonio	30	2	16.1	41.4	32.4	82.7	3.3	0.5	0.5	0.3	1.2	7.4
2016	Did not play (waived)												
2017	Connecticut	19	0	4.4	35.6	**38.7**	**100.0**	0.6	0.2	0.2	0.2	**0.4**	2.6
**Career**	6 years, 2 teams	174	45	19.1	42.2	33.2	75.7	3.9	0.8	0.6	0.6	1.2	10.5
**Career**	All-Star	1	0	8.0	.200	.000	—	4.0	0.0	1.0	0.0	0.0	2.0

==== Playoffs ====
WNBA playoff statistics
Year	Team	GP	GS	MPG	FG%	3P%	FT%	RPG	APG	SPG	BPG	TO	PPG
2011	San Antonio	**3**	0	23.0	48.0	25.0	75.0	3.3	0.7	0.7	0.3	**0.7**	10.7
2012	San Antonio	2	0	22.0	50.0	28.6	**87.5**	6.5	0.5	**1.0**	0.0	1.0	14.5
2014	San Antonio	2	**2**	**30.0**	**56.5**	**33.3**	75.0	**8.5**	**1.5**	0.0	**2.0**	1.5	**17.5**
**Career**	3 years, 1 team	7	2	24.7	51.5	29.2	79.2	5.7	0.9	0.6	0.7	1.0	13.7

=== College ===
NCAA statistics
Year	Team	GP	Points	FG%	3P%	FT%	RPG	APG	SPG	BPG	PPG
2009–10	Texas A&M	33	539	**49.0**	27.7	71.7	5.8	1.0	1.1	**1.4**	16.3
2010–11 *	Texas A&M	**38**	**847**	48.3	**30.0**	**79.4**	**8.5**	1.0	**1.2**	1.3	**22.3**
**Career**		71	1386	48.6	29.1	76.1	7.3	1.0	1.2	1.4	19.5

== Personal life ==
She is the daughter of Tiffany Hill and also has a younger sister.

== Awards and honors ==
- 2009—State Farm/WBCA Junior College Player of the Year
- 2010—Big 12 Tournament Most Outstanding Player
- 2011—NCAA Tournament Most Outstanding Player
- 2011—WNBA All-Rookie Team
- 2016—National Junior College Athletic Association's women's basketball Hall of Fame
