= Dudley High School =

Location
- 16 Eden Street; Suva; Fiji
- Coordinates: 18°08′31″S 178°25′52″E

Information
- Motto: From Within Out
- Denomination: Methodist
- Founded: 1897
- Founder: Hannah Dudley
- Principal: Sanjay Prasad
- Years offered: Year 9- Year 13

Dudley High School is a coeducational high school on Toorak Hill, Suva, Fiji that is run by the Methodist Church of Fiji and Rotuma. It is named after missionary sister, Hannah Dudley who dedicated her life to taking care of Indian women and orphans that were victims of the vicious indentured system that brought labourers from India to Fiji by the colonial government. The indentured system brought thousands of Indians from India to Fiji under degrading conditions in the late 19th and early 20th centuries.

Dudley High School was established in 1897 by Hannah Dudley. The first classes were held under a tree. With more than 1,000 students enrolling annually, Dudley High School has become one of Fiji's large secondary schools.

It has three primary schools namely, Annesley Infant Methodist School, Suva Methodist Primary School and Dudley Intermediate School.

A Methodist chapel close by is also named after Hannah Dudley and is attended by the Indian division of the Methodist Church.
