= Tiffany Jackson (basketball) =

American basketball coach and player (1985–2022)

Personal information
- Born: April 26, 1985 Longview, Texas, U.S.
- Died: October 3, 2022 (aged 37) Dallas, Texas, U.S.
- Listed height: 6 ft 3 in (1.91 m)
- Listed weight: 185 lb (84 kg)

Career information
- High school: Duncanville (Duncanville, Texas)
- College: Texas (2003–2007)
- WNBA draft: 2007: 1st round, 5th overall pick
- Drafted by: New York Liberty
- Playing career: 2007–2017
- Coaching career: 2018–2022

Career history

Playing
- 2007–2010: New York Liberty
- 2010–2011, 2013–2015: Tulsa Shock
- 2013–2020: Maccabi Ashdod
- 2017: Los Angeles Sparks

Coaching
- 2018–2022: Texas (assistant)

Career highlights
- All-American – USBWA (2005); Third-team All-American – AP (2005); 3× First-team All-Big-12 (2005–2007); USBWA National Freshman of the Year (2004); Big-12 Freshman of the Year (2004); McDonald's All-American (2003); Texas Miss Basketball (2003)
- Stats at Basketball Reference

Tiffany Jackson-Jones (April 26, 1985 – October 3, 2022) was an American basketball player and coach. She played college basketball for the Texas Longhorns, earning All-American honors. Jackson played professionally in the Women's National Basketball Association (WNBA) for the New York Liberty, Tulsa Shock, and Los Angeles Sparks. She also played in the Israeli Premier League for Maccabi Ashdod. She later returned to Texas as an assistant coach for the Longhorns.

== Early life ==
Jackson was born in Longview, Texas, on April 26, 1985. She began her high school career at Lincoln High in Dallas, where she led the school to consecutive appearances in the Class 4A state championship game in her sophomore and junior years. Jackson transferred to Duncanville High School in Duncanville as a senior and won a Class 5A state title. She was named an All-American by McDonald's and the Women's Basketball Coaches Association.

== College career ==
Jackson enrolled at the University of Texas at Austin and played college basketball for the Texas Longhorns. In 2004, the United States Basketball Writers Association (USBWA) named her the Freshman of the Year. As a sophomore in 2006, Jackson was named a first-team college All-American by the USBWA and was selected to the third team by the Associated Press (AP). She received honorable mention as an All-American from the AP in both her junior and senior years. She earned all-conference honors in the Big 12 in all four seasons, including first-team selections in her last three seasons.

=== Texas statistics ===
Legend
| GP | Games played | GS | Games started | MPG | Minutes per game |
| FG% | Field goal percentage | 3P% | 3-point field goal percentage | FT% | Free throw percentage |
| RPG | Rebounds per game | APG | Assists per game | SPG | Steals per game |
| BPG | Blocks per game | PPG | Points per game | **Bold** | Career high |

Statistics
| Year | Team | GP | Points | FG% | 3P% | FT% | RPG | APG | SPG | BPG | PPG |
|---|---|---|---|---|---|---|---|---|---|---|---|
| 2003–04 | Texas | **35** | 455 | 47.3 | – | **72.8** | 7.5 | 1.7 | 1.9 | 1.3 | 13.0 |
| 2004–05 | Texas | 31 | **568** | **56.0** | – | 66.7 | 8.7 | 1.8 | 3.3 | **1.9** | **18.3** |
| 2005–06 | Texas | 25 | 357 | 40.7 | – | 71.3 | 8.7 | 2.0 | **2.6** | 1.4 | 14.3 |
| 2006–07 | Texas | 32 | 537 | 41.5 | **33.3** | 68.4 | **9.0** | **2.1** | 2.5 | 1.3 | 16.8 |
| Career | Texas | 123 | 1917 | 46.5 | 33.3 | 69.6 | 8.4 | 1.9 | 2.5 | 1.5 | 15.6 |

== Professional career ==
The New York Liberty of the Women's National Basketball Association (WNBA) selected Jackson in the first round, with the fifth overall selection, of the 2007 WNBA draft. Jackson made her WNBA debut on May 20, 2007, in an 83–71 win over the Chicago Sky. During her rookie season, she led the league in games played (34). She later finished fourth in total rebound percentage (17.5) and fifth in defensive rebound percentage (23.6) the following year. On June 14, 2010, the Liberty traded Jackson to the Tulsa Shock for Plenette Pierson. In the 2011 season, Jackson had her best pro season, averaging 12.4 points and 8.4 rebounds with the Shock. She again led the league in games played (34) and finished second in minutes played (1152) and offensive rebounds (100), third in minutes per game (33.9), fourth in total rebounds (286) and rebounds per game (8.4), and fifth in defensive rebounds (186).

While playing for Tulsa in September 2015, Jackson was diagnosed with stage III breast cancer. After undergoing treatment, Jackson resumed her career with the Maccabi Ashdod in the Israeli Premier League, with whom she had been playing during the WNBA's offseason since 2013. She signed with the Los Angeles Sparks of the WNBA in February 2017.

In February 2018, Jackson re-signed with the Sparks. Although she intended to play one final season with Los Angeles, she retired from the WNBA in April 2018 to return to her alma mater and become an assistant on Longhorns head coach Karen Aston's staff. Jackson continued playing with Maccabi Ashdod until 2020. She finished her career with the club with multiple league championships, and led them to their best finish in the EuroCup in 2015, when they qualified for the semifinals.

== Career statistics ==
=== WNBA ===
Regular season
| Year | Team | GP | GS | MPG | FG% | 3P% | FT% | RPG | APG | SPG | BPG | TO | PPG |
|---|---|---|---|---|---|---|---|---|---|---|---|---|---|
| 2007 | New York | 34 | 0 | 13.9 | .416 | .000 | .570 | 3.1 | 0.6 | 0.6 | 0.3 | 1.4 | 5.1 |
| 2008 | New York | 25 | 0 | 19.8 | .516 | .000 | .630 | 5.7 | 1.0 | 0.9 | 0.3 | 1.9 | 8.3 |
| 2009 | New York | 34 | 9 | 14.6 | .450 | .000 | .719 | 3.4 | 0.7 | 0.6 | 0.3 | 1.2 | 5.3 |
| 2010 | New York / Tulsa | 34 | 17 | 21.1 | .395 | 1.000 | .787 | 5.1 | 1.1 | 1.1 | 0.2 | 1.7 | 6.7 |
| 2011 | Tulsa | 34 | 32 | 33.9 | .456 | .000 | .776 | 8.4 | 2.0 | 1.1 | 0.6 | 2.7 | 12.4 |
| 2013 | Tulsa | 19 | 10 | 20.7 | .393 | .000 | .654 | 4.5 | 0.7 | 1.3 | 0.2 | 1.4 | 4.4 |
| 2014 | Tulsa | 7 | 0 | 10.1 | .400 | .000 | .750 | 1.9 | 0.1 | 0.5 | 0.1 | 0.5 | 2.1 |
| 2015 | Tulsa | 12 | 0 | 23.2 | .500 | .000 | .833 | 4.3 | 0.7 | 0.5 | 0.4 | 1.3 | 4.1 |
| 2017 | Los Angeles | 26 | 1 | 5.7 | .462 | .000 | .625 | 1.2 | 0.1 | 0.0 | 0.1 | 0.4 | 1.1 |
| Career | 9 years, 3 teams | 225 | 69 | 18.3 | .443 | .333 | .712 | 4.5 | 0.9 | 0.8 | 0.3 | 1.6 | 6.2 |

Playoffs
| Year | Team | GP | GS | MPG | FG% | 3P% | FT% | RPG | APG | SPG | BPG | TO | PPG |
|---|---|---|---|---|---|---|---|---|---|---|---|---|---|
| 2007 | New York | 3 | 0 | 14.3 | .471 | – | .778 | 4.3 | 1.0 | 0.7 | 0.3 | 2.0 | 7.7 |
| 2015 | Tulsa | 2 | 0 | 10.5 | .000 | – | .500 | 2.0 | 0.0 | 1.0 | 0.0 | 0.0 | 0.5 |
| 2017 | Los Angeles | 1 | 0 | 0.0 | – | – | – | 0.0 | 0.0 | 0.0 | 0.0 | 0.0 | 0.0 |
| Career | 3 years, 3 teams | 6 | 0 | 10.7 | .381 | – | .727 | 2.8 | 0.7 | 0.7 | 0.2 | 1.0 | 4.0 |

== Coaching career ==
Jackson spent four years as an assistant coach with Texas. In April 2022, she was hired as the new head coach for Wiley College. Jackson died before the 2022-23 basketball season started.

== Personal life ==
Jackson was married to Derrick Jones. Their son, Marley Jones was born in 2012.

== Death ==
Jackson died from breast cancer in Dallas on October 3, 2022. She was 37.
