= Kiesha Brown =

American basketball player (born 1979)

Personal information
- Born: January 13, 1979 (age 47) Atlanta, Georgia, U.S.
- Listed height: 5 ft 10 in (1.78 m)
- Listed weight: 134 lb (61 kg)

Career information
- High school: Woodward Academy (Atlanta, Georgia)
- College: Georgia (1996–2001)
- WNBA draft: 2001: undrafted
- Playing career: 2002–2010
- Position: Point guard
- Number: 14, 6, 8, 4

Career history
- 2002–2005: Washington Mystics
- 2005: Houston Comets
- 2006: New York Liberty
- 2007: Minnesota Lynx
- 2007–2008: Los Angeles Sparks
- 2009: Connecticut Sun
- 2010: Tulsa Shock

Career highlights
- Naismith Prep Player of the Year (1996); 2× Miss Georgia Basketball (1995, 1996)
- Stats at WNBA.com
- Stats at Basketball Reference

Kiesha Brown (born January 13, 1979) is an American professional basketball player.

== High school ==
Born in Atlanta, Georgia, Brown attended Woodward Academy in Atlanta, where she was named a High School All-American by the WBCA. She participated in the WBCA High School All-America Game in 1996, scoring eleven points, and earning MVP honors.

== College ==
Brown attended college at the University of Georgia and graduated in 2002.

=== Georgia statistics ===
Legend
GP	Games played	GS	Games started	MPG	Minutes per game
FG%	Field goal percentage	3P%	3-point field goal percentage	FT%	Free throw percentage
RPG	Rebounds per game	APG	Assists per game	SPG	Steals per game
BPG	Blocks per game	PPG	Points per game	**Bold**	Career high

Year	Team	GP	Points	FG%	3P%	FT%	RPG	APG	SPG	BPG	PPG
1996-97	Georgia	8	52	**46.3%**	11.1%	68.4%	2.5	**4.5**	**1.3**	0.1	**6.5**
1997-98	Georgia	Redshirt									
1998-99	Georgia	33	**196**	38.9%	**23.5%**	71.6%	3.0	3.2	1.2	0.1	5.8
1999-00	Georgia	**36**	87	36.0%	0.0%	62.5%	1.9	1.5	0.9	**0.2**	2.4
2000–01	Georgia	33	160	33.3%	8.3%	**74.6%**	**3.1**	2.8	0.8	0.2	4.8
Career		111	335	37.0%	19.1%	69.4%	1.7	1.8	0.8	0.1	3.0

== WNBA ==
Brown has played for the Washington Mystics, Houston Comets, New York Liberty, Minnesota Lynx, Los Angeles Sparks, and Tulsa Shock.

== WNBA career statistics ==
Legend
GP	Games played	GS	Games started	MPG	Minutes per game	RPG	Rebounds per game
APG	Assists per game	SPG	Steals per game	BPG	Blocks per game	PPG	Points per game
TO	Turnovers per game	FG%	Field-goal percentage	3P%	3-point field-goal percentage	FT%	Free-throw percentage
**Bold**	Career best	°	League leader

=== Regular season ===
Year	Team	GP	GS	MPG	FG%	3P%	FT%	RPG	APG	SPG	BPG	TO	PPG
2002	Washington	18	0	6.0	.343	.091	**1.000**	0.7	0.3	0.3	0.0	0.3	1.6
2003	Washington	27	0	10.0	.333	.303	.667	1.2	1.0	0.5	0.0	0.8	2.2
2004	Washington	26	0	14.3	.398	**.464**	.875	1.9	1.6	0.5	0.1	1.3	4.0
2005	Washington	2	0	7.0	**.500**	.000	.000	0.0	0.0	**1.0**	0.0	1.0	1.0
2005	Houston	4	0	4.5	.000	.000	.000	0.3	0.5	0.3	0.0	0.5	0.0
2006	New York	16	0	3.6	.300	.250	.875	0.5	0.6	0.1	0.0	0.2	1.3
2007	Minnesota	3	0	9.7	.222	.333	.750	1.7	0.7	0.3	**0.3**	0.7	3.7
2007	Los Angeles	27	0	12.1	.394	.450	.875	1.4	1.8	0.4	0.1	0.9	4.9
2008	Los Angeles	32	**17**	16.6	.356	.343	.912	1.8	2.1	0.6	0.0	1.2	4.9
2009	Connecticut	**34**	0	11.6	.382	.333	.818	1.6	1.1	0.4	0.1	0.9	3.8
2010	Tulsa	27	8	**17.8**	.389	.391	.821	**2.0**	**2.4**	0.6	0.0	1.5	**5.7**
Career	8 years, 7 teams	216	25	12.0	.371	.359	.859	1.5	1.4	0.4	0.0	0.9	3.7

=== Playoffs ===
Year	Team	GP	GS	MPG	FG%	3P%	FT%	RPG	APG	SPG	BPG	TO	PPG
2002	Washington	2	0	7.5	.500	.000	.000	**0.5**	**0.5**	**1.0**	0.0	0.0	3.0
2004	Washington	2	0	1.5	**1.000**	**1.000**	.000	0.0	0.0	0.0	0.0	0.0	1.5
2005	Houston	1	0	1.0	.000	.000	**1.000'**	0.0	0.0	0.0	0.0	0.0	2.0
2008	Los Angeles	**4**	**3**	**8.0**	.429	.333	**1.000**	0.3	**0.5**	0.0	0.0	0.3	**3.5**
Career	4 years, 3 teams	9	3	5.7	.476	.333	1.000	0.2	0.3	0.2	0.0	0.1	2.8

== European career ==
- 2004-05: (Czech Republic) USK Blex Prague
- 2005-06: (Spain) Hondarribia-Irun
- 2007-08: (Spain) Extrugasa
- 2009: (Turkey) Galatasaray
