= 2011 WNBA draft =

2011 meeting of WNBA teams to select players

General information
- Sport: Basketball
- Date: April 11, 2011
- Location: Bristol, Connecticut
- Networks: ESPN, NBATV, ESPNU

Overview
- League: WNBA
- First selection: Maya Moore; Minnesota Lynx

The 2011 WNBA draft is the league's annual process for determining which teams receive the rights to negotiate with players entering the league. The draft was held on April 11, 2011, at the ESPN studios in Bristol, Connecticut. The first round was shown on ESPN (HD), while the second and third rounds were shown on NBA TV and ESPNU.

== Draft lottery ==
The lottery selection to determine the order of the top four picks in the 2011 draft occurred on November 2, 2010. The Minnesota Lynx won the first pick, while the Tulsa Shock, Chicago Sky and Lynx were awarded the second, third and fourth picks respectively. The remaining first-round picks and all the second- and third-round picks were assigned to teams in reverse order of their win–loss records in the previous season.

Below were the chances for each team to get specific picks in the 2010 draft lottery, rounded to three decimal places:

| Team | 2010 record | Lottery chances | Pick | | | |
| Team | 2010 record | Lottery chances | 1st | 2nd | 3rd | 4th |
|---|---|---|---|---|---|---|
| Tulsa Shock | 6–28 | 442 | .442 | .316 | .181 | .062 |
| Minnesota Lynx | 13–21 | 276 | .276 | .310 | .270 | .144 |
| Chicago Sky | 14–20 | 178 | .178 | .230 | .317 | .275 |
| Minnesota Lynx (from Conn.) | 17–17 | 104 | .104 | .145 | .232 | .520 |
Shaded block denotes actual lottery result.

== Transactions ==
- March 11, 2010: Atlanta and San Antonio swap second-round picks as part of the Michelle Snow transaction.
- April 7, 2010: Connecticut receives a second-round pick from Tulsa as part of the Chante Black/Amber Holt transaction.
- April 8, 2010: Minnesota receives Connecticut's first-round pick and Tulsa's second-round pick from Connecticut as part of the Kelsey Griffin transaction.
- May 13, 2010: Chicago receives a second-round pick from Los Angeles as part of the Kristi Toliver transaction.
- May 27, 2010: Tulsa receives a second-round pick from Indiana as part of the Shavonte Zellous transaction.
- July 23, 2010: Tulsa receives a first-round pick from Phoenix as part of the Kara Braxton/Nicole Ohlde transaction.

== Invited players ==
The WNBA announced on April 6, 2011, that 15 players had been invited to attend the draft.

- (United States) Danielle Adams, Texas A&M
- (United States) Jessica Breland, North Carolina
- Liz Cambage, Bulleen Boomers (Australia)
- (United States) Sydney Colson, Texas A&M
- (United States) Victoria Dunlap, Kentucky
- (United States) Amber Harris, Xavier
- (United States) Jantel Lavender, Ohio State
- (United States) Maya Moore, Connecticut
- (United States) Kayla Pedersen, Stanford
- (United States) Ta'Shia Phillips, Xavier
- (United States) Jeanette Pohlen, Stanford
- (United States) Danielle Robinson, Oklahoma
- (United States) Carolyn Swords, Boston College
- (United States) Jasmine Thomas, Duke
- (United States) Courtney Vandersloot, Gonzaga

== Key ==
| ! | Denotes player who has been inducted to the Naismith Memorial Basketball Hall of Fame |
| ^ | Denotes player who has been inducted to the Women's Basketball Hall of Fame |
| * | Denotes player who has been selected for at least one All-Star Game and All-WNBA Team |
| ^{+} | Denotes player who has been selected for at least one All-Star Game |
| ^{#} | Denotes player who never played in the WNBA regular season or playoffs |
| **Bold** | Denotes player who won Rookie of the Year |

== Draft selections ==
=== Round 1 ===
| Pick | Player | Nationality | Team | School / club team |
|---|---|---|---|---|
| 1 | **Maya Moore** * ^ ! | United States | Minnesota Lynx | Connecticut |
| 2 | Liz Cambage * | Australia | Tulsa Shock | Bulleen Boomers (Australia) |
| 3 | Courtney Vandersloot * | United States | Chicago Sky | Gonzaga |
| 4 | Amber Harris | United States | Minnesota Lynx (from Connecticut) | Xavier |
| 5 | Jantel Lavender ^{+} | United States | Los Angeles Sparks | Ohio State |
| 6 | Danielle Robinson * | United States | San Antonio Silver Stars | Oklahoma |
| 7 | Kayla Pedersen | United States | Tulsa Shock (from Phoenix) | Stanford |
| 8 | Ta'Shia Phillips (traded to Washington) | United States | Atlanta Dream | Xavier |
| 9 | Jeanette Pohlen | United States | Indiana Fever | Stanford |
| 10 | Alex Montgomery | United States | New York Liberty | Georgia Tech |
| 11 | Victoria Dunlap | United States | Washington Mystics | Kentucky |
| 12 | Jasmine Thomas ^{+} | United States | Seattle Storm | Duke |

=== Round 2 ===
| Pick | Player | Nationality | Team | School / club team |
|---|---|---|---|---|
| 13 | Jessica Breland ^{+} (traded to New York) | United States | Minnesota Lynx (from Tulsa via Connecticut) | North Carolina |
| 14 | Felicia Chester (traded to Atlanta) | United States | Minnesota Lynx | DePaul |
| 15 | Carolyn Swords | United States | Chicago Sky | Boston College |
| 16 | Sydney Colson (traded to New York) | United States | Connecticut Sun | Texas A&M |
| 17 | Angie Bjorklund | United States | Chicago Sky (from Los Angeles) | Tennessee |
| 18 | Rachel Jarry (traded to Minnesota) | Australia | Atlanta Dream (from San Antonio) | Bulleen Boomers (Australia) |
| 19 | Brittany Spears ^{#} | United States | Phoenix Mercury | Colorado |
| 20 | Danielle Adams ^{+} | United States | San Antonio Silver Stars (from Atlanta) | Texas A&M |
| 21 | Italee Lucas ^{#} | United States | Tulsa Shock (from Indiana) | North Carolina |
| 22 | Angel Robinson ^{#} (traded to Minnesota) | United States | New York Liberty | Marquette |
| 23 | Karima Christmas | United States | Washington Mystics | Duke |
| 24 | Ify Ibekwe | United States | Seattle Storm | Arizona |

=== Round 3 ===
| Pick | Player | Nationality | Team | School / club team |
|---|---|---|---|---|
| 25 | Chastity Reed | United States | Tulsa Shock | Arkansas–Little Rock |
| 26 | Kachine Alexander ^{#} | United States | Minnesota Lynx | Iowa |
| 27 | Amy Jaeschke ^{#} | United States | Chicago Sky | Northwestern |
| 28 | Adrienne Johnson | United States | Connecticut Sun | Louisiana Tech |
| 29 | Elina Babkina (pick later voided) | Latvia | Los Angeles Sparks | Lotos VBW Clima Gdynia (Poland) |
| 30 | Porsha Phillips | United States | San Antonio Silver Stars | Georgia |
| 31 | Tahnee Robinson ^{#} (traded to Connecticut) | United States | Phoenix Mercury | Nevada |
| 32 | Kelsey Bolte ^{#} | United States | Atlanta Dream | Iowa State |
| 33 | Jori Davis ^{#} | United States | Indiana Fever | Indiana |
| 34 | Mekia Valentine ^{#} | United States | New York Liberty | UC Santa Barbara |
| 35 | Sara Krnjić ^{#} | Serbia | Washington Mystics | Pécs 2010 (Hungary) |
| 36 | Krystal Thomas | United States | Seattle Storm | Duke |

== See also ==
- List of first overall WNBA draft picks
