= Shanna Zolman =

American professional basketball player (born 1983)

Personal information
- Born: September 7, 1983 (age 43) Syracuse, Indiana, U.S.
- Listed height: 5 ft 10 in (1.78 m)
- Listed weight: 155 lb (70 kg)

Career information
- High school: Wawasee (Syracuse, Indiana)
- College: Tennessee (2002–2006)
- WNBA draft: 2006: 2nd round, 16th overall pick
- Drafted by: San Antonio Silver Stars
- Playing career: 2006–2010
- Position: Point guard

Career history
- 2006–2007, 2009: San Antonio Silver Stars
- 2010: Tulsa Shock

Career highlights
- First-team All-SEC (2006); SEC All-Freshman Team (2003); McDonald's All-American Game Co-MVP (2002); Indiana Miss Basketball (2002)
- Stats at WNBA.com
- Stats at Basketball Reference

Shanna Annette Zolman (born September 7, 1983) is an American professional basketball player, most recently for the Tulsa Shock of the Women's National Basketball Association (WNBA). She attended college at the University of Tennessee and graduated in 2006 with a degree in Broadcasting. Following her collegiate career, she was selected 16th overall in the 2006 WNBA draft by the San Antonio Silver Stars.

== Early life ==
Zolman is the daughter of Kem and Lynnette Zolman, and has one brother, Joshua. She was also married to former Tennessee running back Andrew Crossley on October 14, 2006. Shanna played at Wawasee High School in Syracuse, Indiana. In her high school career she scored a record 3,085 points, passing former Purdue Guard Stephanie White (2,869) as most in Indiana basketball history. She led the state in scoring each of her 4 years at Wawasee High School, while posting a career scoring average of 33.2 points per game. She holds the national record in three categories: all-time consecutive free throws (70), career free-throw percentage (93.5%), and season free-throw percentage (95.4%). Her career totals for high school include 3,085 points, 730 rebounds, 453 steals and 430 assists in 93 games. Zolman was named a WBCA All-American. She participated in the 2002 WBCA High School All-America Game, where she scored fifteen points. She also participated in the 2002 McDonald's All-American Game, the first ever held for high school girls. Zolman scored 21 points and handed out 5 assists in the game, and she was named co-MVP for her efforts.

Zolman holds the NCAA single season (.957 in 2003–04) and career (.916) free throw percentage records. She broke several Lady Volunteer records during her 4 years, including Single Game 3-pointers (7), Single Season 3-Pointers (103), Career 3-Point Percentage (.425), Single Season Free Throw Percentage (.957), and Career Free Throw Percentage (.916). Previously, Zolman was the sole holder for most 3-Pointers made with 266 before Angie Bjorklund became the 3-pointers record holder with 300. She is the 9th highest scorer in Tennessee Volunteers women's basketball history (1,806). Shanna wore a No. 1 jersey during most of her junior year in honor of her teammate and best friend, Sidney Spencer, who missed the majority of the season after tearing her ACL.

== Tennessee statistics ==
Legend
GP	Games played	GS	Games started	MPG	Minutes per game
FG%	Field goal percentage	3P%	3-point field goal percentage	FT%	Free throw percentage
RPG	Rebounds per game	APG	Assists per game	SPG	Steals per game
BPG	Blocks per game	PPG	Points per game	**Bold**	Career high

Year	Team	GP	Points	FG%	3P%	FT%	RPG	APG	SPG	BPG	PPG
2002-03	Tennessee	**38**	285	41.9	38.5	89.2	2.1	1.7	0.8	0.1	7.5
2003-04	Tennessee	35	430	43.7	42.6	**95.7**	2.8	2.0	1.0	0.1	12.3
2004-05	Tennessee	35	437	**44.1**	**43.6**	86.2	2.3	1.8	1.0	0.1	12.5
2005-06	Tennessee	36	**554**	43.3	43.3	94.4	**2.9**	**3.2**	0.8	0.1	**15.4**
Career	Tennessee	144	1706	43.3	42.5	91.6	2.5	2.2	0.9	0.1	11.8

== WNBA career ==
=== San Antonio Silver Stars ===
On April 5, 2006, Zolman was drafted by the San Antonio Silver Stars in the second round (No. 16 overall) of the 2006 WNBA draft. In her rookie season, Zolman played in all 34 regular season games finishing a solid rookie season averaging 6.6 points per game while playing 16.1 minutes per game. She ranked 13th in the WNBA in 3 Point Percentage (.378). She scored a career-high 18 points against the Phoenix Mercury on August 12, 2006. The San Antonio Silver Stars finished 13–21 on the season, missing the playoffs.

During the 2007 WNBA season, Zolman played in all 34 regular season games, starting one, making her the only Silver Stars player to have appeared in every game for the last two seasons. She averaged 9.2 points, 1.4 rebounds, 0.8 steals and 0.41 steals per game. Zolman also tied a franchise record for 3-pointers made in a game after hitting 7 of 11 3-pt field goal attempts on Aug 2 against the Phoenix Mercury (also ties for second in WNBA history).

On August 30, 2007, Zolman played a key role in the waning moments of the Phoenix Mercury's controversial victory over the Silver Stars in Game 1 of the WNBA Western Conference Finals. After Becky Hammon hit a three-point shot to tie the game with approximately three seconds left in regulation, Phoenix attempted to drive for a final basket. Phoenix guard Cappie Pondexter fell to the floor in the backcourt under defensive pressure from Zolman. Zolman was called for a reach-in foul with 2.1 seconds remaining, and in turn Pondexter made two free throws and Phoenix won the game, 102–100. ESPN announcers and many fans questioned the call, because video footage arguably indicated that Pondexter had merely slipped and Zolman had committed no foul. Additionally, the replay also showed that Shanna's jab step toward Pondexter is what caused Cappie to falter, and since there wasn't any contact made, the correct call should have been a traveling violation on Phoenix; in effect, a great defensive play by Shanna Zolman. Mercury fans, however, felt the call was appropriate. While most objective fans consider it to be one of the worst calls in WNBA history. The head official reviewed the call to determine how much time remained on the clock, but WNBA rules do not permit instant replay review of whether a foul was committed. At the post game press conference, Hammon stated that Zolman did nothing wrong and that the officials made a mistake. Lost in all this, is that Zolman came within an eyelash of sinking a 75-foot shot at the buzzer to make the issue moot. But, it bounced off the rim. Determined to make good, Shanna came out of the gate sizzling hot in Game 2, scoring 17 first-half points, including 5 three-pointers. She finished the game with 20 points, including 6 three-pointers, as the Silver Stars were defeated 98–92.

During the 2008 WNBA Preseason, Zolman tore the Anterior Cruciate Ligament in her left knee during May 12, 2008, contest with the Detroit Shock. Zolman injured her knee during San Antonio's second offensive possession of the game. After the season-ending injury, Zolman had a successful surgery to repair the torn ligament. She made her return from injury on May 30, 2009, in a preseason game against the Detroit Shock.

=== Tulsa Shock ===
Zolman was traded to the Tulsa Shock on April 14, 2010. After playing for Tulsa in 2010, she suffered a torn ACL while playing in Turkey and underwent successful surgery on January 26, 2011. After rehabbing her knee Zolman was in the 2012 Shock training camp but was cut from the team after playing 10 minutes in one preseason game. Zolman then retired from basketball.

== Personal life ==
On October 14, 2006, Shanna married her college sweetheart, former University of Tennessee fullback Andrew David Crossley (b. August 4, 1980), whom she met at a Fellowship of Christian Athletes meeting. However and since they have been divorced, Shanna has decided to go back to her maiden name of Zolman.

Zolman is a strong believer in community service, she has volunteered her time with Race for the Cure, the Muscular Dystrophy Association, the Dogwood Arts Parade, the Toyota Literacy program and singing Christmas carols at area nursing homes. Shanna is an active member of the Fellowship of Christian Athletes. She has served as the spokesperson for the 2006 Silver Stars 5K Run/Walk. Beginning in 2008, Zolman created the All Things Basketball Camp, an annual event for 5th–12th grade girls in the San Antonio area. During the offseason, she resides in Seattle, Washington.

While announcing that she had retired from basketball, Zolman said that she would work with the Fellowship of Christian Athletes doing ministry and mentoring, and that the work had made the transition from playing basketball much easier than she had anticipated. "I love ministry and I love mentoring. It’s a huge passion of mine. I prayed that I would find something that I had a passion greater than basketball for and God had a plan for me."

== WNBA career statistics ==
Regular season	Team	G	GS	MPG	FG%	3P%	FT%	OFF	DEF	RPG	APG	PPG
2006	San Antonio Stars	34	0	16.2	0.379	0.378	0.667	0.2	1.0	1.2	1.0	6.6
2007	San Antonio Stars	24	1	16.1	0.393	0.409	0.897	0.1	1.2	1.4	0.8	9.2
2009	San Antonio Stars	19	1	9.3	0.461	0.444	0.833	0.0	0.5	0.5	0.3	5.0
2010	Tulsa Shock	30	16	21.3	0.404	0.422	0.800	0.3	1.1	1.4	1.6	9.7
Career		117	18	16.4	0.399	0.408	0.807	0.2	1.0	1.2	1.0	7.9
