= YurView Oklahoma =

Cable TV channel in Oklahoma, United States

- Country: United States
- Broadcast area: Oklahoma County and Tulsa County, Oklahoma
- Headquarters: Oklahoma City

Programming
- Language: American English
- Picture format: 480i (SDTV); 720p (HDTV)

Ownership
- Owner: Cox Communications

History
- Launched: 2004
- Former names: The Cox Channel (2004–2017)

Links
- Website: www.yurview.com/oklahoma/

YurView Oklahoma (formerly known as The Cox Channel from 2004 to 2017 and as Cox Channel 3 from 1999 to 2004) is a local origination cable television channel based in Oklahoma City, Oklahoma, United States, owned by Cox Communications. The channel is available throughout Cox's Oklahoma City and Tulsa-area cable television systems on channel 3.

== Background ==
The channel originated on cable channel 67 in Oklahoma City in 1995, and in its early days had only carried a bulletin board for local events and for the system itself, as well as occasional free preview weekends of premium channels and some sports programming. After acquiring TCI's cable system in Tulsa in 2000, Cox Communications added similar programming to the local origination channel on cable channel 9.

Cox adopted a uniform branding for its local origination channel in the Oklahoma City and Tulsa service areas as The Cox Channel in 2004; two years later in 2006, the channel was moved to channel 7 in the Oklahoma City market, trading its channel placement with NBC affiliate KFOR-TV (channel 4), and to channel 3 in the Tulsa market; in Oklahoma City, it returned to channel 3 in March 2010. Until 2006, the channel was also available on cable outside the Oklahoma City and Tulsa areas in portions of Oklahoma; that year, Cox sold its systems outside the Oklahoma City and Tulsa areas to Cebridge Connections (now Suddenlink Communications), and was dropped by December of that year.

On December 14, 2010 Cox Communications relegated access to TV Guide Network's programming on channel 2 in Oklahoma City to digital cable subscribers and subscribers using a CableCard on their analog cable box, at which time Cox dropped the program guide from the channel due to the presence of an interactive program guide that digital subscribers can access on their TVs; on that date, Cox separated the standard-definition feeds of the Cox Channel to its customers: analog cable subscribers began seeing the TV Guide Network's former scrolling program grid (restyled to the color-coded version of the guide based on genre, used on the channel nationally until July 1, 2010) on the bottom quarter of the screen while regular programming was carried at the top two-thirds of the screen. Digital cable subscribers continue to see The Cox Channel full-screen without the grid.

In March 2017, Cox Communications rebranded its local origination channels under the YurView banner (with The Cox Channel relaunching as YurView Oklahoma), as part of a nationwide effort by Cox to bring all of their community access channels under a unified brand.

== Programming ==
More or less, it operates as a regional sports network for Oklahoma's two largest metropolitan areas (although officially, the primary regional sports network for the Oklahoma City and Tulsa television markets is the Fox Sports Oklahoma subfeed of Fox Sports Southwest), but it mostly offers public interest programming. The channel's sports offerings consist mainly of high school sports with football games during the fall season and basketball games during the late winter and early spring months, along with high school swimming events; these games are broadcast under the banner "Oklahoma Ford High School Game of the Week."

The channel also broadcasts Southland Conference football games, Oklahoma Sooners and Oklahoma State Cowboys women's basketball and softball games, as well as St. Louis Cardinals Major League Baseball games not carried via national sports channels, generally simulcasting Cardinals games carried by Fox Sports Midwest during the MLB season (Cox Communications has offered Cardinals games to its Oklahoma cable system area since the late 1990s, as games were carried by the Oklahoma City system on analog cable channel 67, when they began carrying the games). Since 2010, the Cox Channel/YurView has also carried games from the WNBA's Tulsa Shock women's professional basketball team that are not carried nationally on ESPN and NBA TV. The channel also carries a sports wrapup program called SportsNight Oklahoma, airing on weeknights at 6:30 and 10 p.m. (CT). In June 2012, the channel began airing Texas Rangers games from KTXA on Friday nights. In 2024, YurView Oklahoma began airing select matches featuring FC Tulsa of the USL Championship.

YurView Oklahoma airs local programming, informercials or older TV series (such as the classic western Gunsmoke) when there is no sports programming to air. It airs a limited amount of news programming as it carries the University of Oklahoma's weekday afternoon newscast called OU Nightly, produced by the university's journalism department. The channel also carries simulcast blocks of programming from the local real estate channel GoScout Homes (which is carried as a standalone channel on digital cable channel 22 in Oklahoma City and digital cable channel 122 in both Oklahoma City and Tulsa) and since July 2010, a simulcast of the morning newscast from news/talk radio station KRMG-AM/FM (Tulsa) on weekday mornings from 5:00 to 9:00 a.m. CT.
