= 2014 Minnesota Lynx season =

- Head coach: Cheryl Reeve
- Arena: Target Center

Results
- Record: 25–9 (.735)
- Place: 2nd (Western)
- Playoff finish: Lost in Conference Finals

Media
- Television: FS-N; ESPN2, NBATV
- Radio: KLCI

The 2014 Minnesota Lynx season was the 16th season for the Minnesota Lynx of the Women's National Basketball Association, and the 5th season under head coach Cheryl Reeve.

The Lynx were defending their 2013 WNBA Championship, seeking to become the third franchise to win three titles. However, their bid fell short as they lost to the Phoenix Mercury in the conference finals.

The Lynx had a positive offseason, re-signing free agent center Janel McCarville and guard Monica Wright, two key components of the 2013 championship team. The Lynx also announced their first uniform sponsor, the Mayo Clinic.

== Transactions ==
=== Draft ===
The following are the Lynx's selections in the 2014 WNBA draft.

Round	Pick	Player	Nationality	School/team/country
1	12	Tricia Liston	United States	Duke
2	15	Asya Bussie	United States	West Virginia
2	24	Christina Foggie	United States	Vanderbilt
3	36	Asia Taylor	United States	Louisville

=== Trades ===
Date	Trade	
	To Minnesota Lynx	To New York Liberty
	Right to swap 3rd round picks in 2015 WNBA Draft	Sugar Rodgers

=== Personnel changes ===
==== Additions ====
Player	Signed	Former team
Damiris Dantas	April 2, 2014	Unsigned 2012 Draftee
Tricia Liston	April 15, 2014	Draft Pick
Asya Bussie	April 15, 2014	Draft Pick
Christina Foggie	April 15, 2014	Draft Pick
Asia Taylor	April 15, 2014	Draft Pick
Tan White	April 16, 2014	Connecticut Sun (free agent)

==== Subtractions ====
Player	Left	New team
Amber Harris	February 14, 2014	Suspended
Sugar Rodgers	February 16, 2014	New York Liberty

== Roster ==
2014 Minnesota Lynx roster
Players
Coaches

Pos.	No.	Nat.	Name	Height	Weight	DOB	From	Yrs
G/F	33	(United States)	Augustus, Seimone	6' 0" (1.83m)	165 lb (75kg)	1984-04-30	LSU	8
F	32	(United States)	Brunson, Rebekkah	6' 2" (1.88m)	184 lb (83kg)	1981-12-11	Georgetown	10
C	34	(Brazil)	Dantas, Damiris	6' 4" (1.93m)	190 lb (86kg)	1992-11-17	Brazil	R
G	20	(United States)	Liston, Tricia	6' 1" (1.85m)	181 lb (82kg)	1992-02-20	Duke	R
C	4	(United States)	McCarville, Janel	6' 2" (1.88m)	218 lb (99kg)	1982-11-03	Minnesota	7
G	3	(United States)	McKenith, Nadirah	5' 7" (1.7m)	155 lb (70kg)	1991-09-06	St. John's	1
F	23	(United States)	Moore, Maya	6' 0" (1.83m)	176 lb (80kg)	1989-06-11	Connecticut	3
F	14	(United States)	Peters, Devereaux	6' 2" (1.88m)	170 lb (77kg)	1989-10-08	Notre Dame	2
G	31	(United States)	Taylor, Asia	6' 1" (1.85m)	165 lb (75kg)	1991-08-21	Louisville	R
G	13	(United States)	Whalen, Lindsay	5' 9" (1.75m)	162 lb (73kg)	1982-05-09	Minnesota	10
G	5	(United States)	White, Tan	5' 7" (1.7m)	154 lb (70kg)	1982-09-27	Mississippi State	10
G/F	22	(United States)	Wright, Monica	5' 10" (1.78m)	170 lb (77kg)	1988-07-15	Virginia	4

Head coach
(United States) Cheryl Reeve (La Salle)
Assistant coaches
(United States) Shelley Patterson (Washington State)
(United States) Jim Petersen (Minnesota)
Athletic trainer
(United States) Chuck Barta (UW–La Crosse)
Assistant trainer
(United States) Keith Uzpen (Minnesota State)

Legend

- (C) Team captain
- (DP) Unsigned draft pick
- (FA) Free agent
- (S) Suspended
- Injured

=== Depth ===
Pos.	Starter	Bench
C	Janel McCarville	Devereaux Peters
PF	Damiris Dantas	Asia Taylor; Rebekkah Brunson
SF	Maya Moore	Tricia Liston
SG	Seimone Augustus	Tan White; Monica Wright
PG	Lindsay Whalen	Lindsey Moore

== Schedule ==
=== Preseason ===
2014 pre-season game log
Total: 3–0 (Home: 2–0; Road: 1–0)
Pre-season: 3–0 (Home: 2–0; Road: 1–0)

Game	Date	Team	Score	High points	High rebounds	High assists	Location Attendance	Record
1	May 5	Australia	W 82–66	Waltea Rolle (17)	Maya Moore (7)	Tan White (8)	Target Center; 2550	1–0
2	May 9	Phoenix	W 72–64	Tan White (16)	Maya Moore and Tricia Liston (6)	Damiris Dantas and Tan White (3)	ESPN Wide World of Sports Complex; 3194	2–0
3	May 11	@ Chicago	W 76–69	Asia Taylor (18)	Damiris Dantas (9)	Lindsey Moore (8)	ESPN Wide World of Sports Complex; 3194	3–0

2014 season schedule

=== Regular season ===
2014 game log
Total: 19–6 (Home: 12–1; Road: 7–5)
May: 6–0 (Home: 3–0; Road: 3–0)

Game	Date	Team	Score	High points	High rebounds	High assists	Location Attendance	Record
1	May 16	@ Washington	W 89–77	Maya Moore (34)	Damiris Dantas (12)	Lindsay Whalen (8)	Verizon Center; 7395	1–0
2	May 18	Connecticut	W 90–87	Maya Moore (33)	Maya Moore (12)	Lindsay Whalen (4)	Target Center; 9434	2–0
3	May 23	@ Tulsa	W 94–93	Maya Moore (38)	Maya Moore (13)	Lindsay Whalen (5)	BOK Center; 6845	3–0
4	May 24	New York	W 87–82	Maya Moore (30)	Damiris Dantas (8)	Janel McCarville (6)	Target Center; 8323	4–0
5	May 26	@ Chicago	W 75–72	Lindsay Whalen (22)	Janel McCarville (12)	Lindsay Whalen (4)	Allstate Arena; 6058	5–0
6	May 30	San Antonio	W 88–72	Maya Moore (26)	Maya Moore (9)	McCarville & M. Moore (5)	Target Center; 8734	6–0

June: 6–5 (Home: 3–1; Road: 3–4)

Game	Date	Team	Score	High points	High rebounds	High assists	Location Attendance	Record
7	June 1	@ San Antonio	W 87–79	Seimone Augustus (25)	Maya Moore (9)	Lindsay Whalen (10)	AT&T Center; 5089	7–0
8	June 6	@ Seattle	L 64–67	Augustus & M. Moore (12)	Damiris Dantas (8)	Tan White (5)	KeyArena; 6836	7–1
9	June 8	@ Los Angeles	W 85–72	Seimone Augustus (26)	Maya Moore (13)	Lindsay Whalen (7)	Staples Center; 8770	8–1
10	June 13	@ Atlanta	L 82–85	Lindsay Whalen (22)	Maya Moore (9)	Seimone Augustus (6)	Philips Arena; 6684	8–2
11	June 15	Phoenix	L 82–85	Maya Moore (13)	Damiris Dantas (12)	Lindsay Whalen (5)	Target Center; 8957	8–3
12	June 17	@ Los Angeles	W 94–77	Maya Moore (31)	Devereaux Peters (6)	Janel McCarville (8)	Staples Center; 9636	9–3
13	June 18	@ Phoenix	L 79–92	Maya Moore (36)	M. Moore & Whalen (4)	Lindsay Whalen (5)	US Airways Center; 8963	9–4
14	June 20	Washington	W 75–65	Maya Moore (20)	Maya Moore (10)	M. Moore & L.Whalen (7)	Target Center; 8813	10–4
15	June 22	Indiana	W 83–77	Maya Moore (25)	M. Moore & Peters (6)	Lindsay Whalen (6)	Target Center; 8704	11–4
16	June 27	@ Seattle	L 71–81	Maya Moore (20)	Maya Moore (10)	Lindsay Whalen (4)	KeyArena; 6547	11–5
17	June 29	Seattle	W 74–69	Janel McCarville (22)	Maya Moore (7)	Maya Moore (7)	Target Center; 8814	12–5

July: 9–1 (Home: 7–0; Road: 2–1)

Game	Date	Team	Score	High points	High rebounds	High assists	Location Attendance	Record
18	July 3	San Antonio	W 91–84	Lindsay Whalen (22)	Janel McCarville (9)	Lindsay Whalen (7)	Target Center; 7622	13–5
19	July 6	@ New York	L 80–87	Maya Moore (25)	Maya Moore (8)	Lindsay Whalen (5)	Madison Square Garden; 8151	13–6
20	July 8	Los Angeles	W 83–72	Maya Moore (30)	Lindsay Whalen (9)	Devereaux Peters (6)	Target Center; 7920	14–6
21	July 10	@ Tulsa	W 91–85	Maya Moore (33)	Maya Moore (11)	Lindsay Whalen (10)	BOK Center; 4961	15–6
22	July 13	Seattle	W 77–60	Maya Moore (26)	Maya Moore (12)	Lindsay Whalen (7)	Target Center; 9114	16–6
23	July 16	Tulsa	W 93–82	Maya Moore (32)	Damiris Dantas (11)	Moore and Whalen (5)	Target Center; 16413	17–6
24	July 22	Atlanta	W 112–108	Maya Moore (48)	Rebekkah Brunson (12)	Lindsay Whalen (9)	Target Center; 9332	18–6
25	July 25	San Antonio	W 88–78	Seimone Augustus (17)	Maya Moore (8)	Seimone Augustus (6)	Target Center; 9104	19–6
26	July 27	@ Connecticut	W 76–65	Maya Moore (17)	Rebekkah Brunson (10)	Maya Moore (4)	Mohegan Sun Arena; 8019	20–6
27	July 31	Phoenix	W 75–67	Maya Moore (20)	Rebekkah Brunson (11)	McCarville & Whalen (5)	Target Center; 9513	21–6

August: 1–0 (Home: 0–0; Road: 1–0)

Game	Date	Team	Score	High points	High rebounds	High assists	Location Attendance	Record
28	August 2	@ Tulsa	W 84–75	Maya Moore (40)	Rebekkah Brunson (9)	Lindsay Whalen (6)	BOK Center; 6339	22–6
29	August 5	@ Indiana					Bankers Life Fieldhouse	23–6
30	August 7	Chicago					Target Center	24–6
31	August 9	@ Phoenix					US Airways Center	24–7
32	August 12	Los Angeles					Target Center	24–8
33	August 15	@ San Antonio					AT&T Center	24–9
34	August 16	Tulsa	W 80–63	Maya Moore (19)	Maya Moore (12)	Lindsay Whalen (9)	Target Center	25–9

2014 season schedule

== 2014 Season standings ==
#	Western Conference					
#	Team	W	L	PCT	GB	GP
1	y-Phoenix Mercury	29	5	.853	-	34
2	x-Minnesota Lynx	25	9	.735	4.0	34
3	x-San Antonio Stars	16	18	.471	13.0	34
4	x-Los Angeles Sparks	16	18	.471	13.0	34
5	e-Tulsa Shock	12	22	.353	17.0	34
6	e-Seattle Storm	12	22	.353	17.0	34

== Awards and honors ==
- June Player of the Month: Maya Moore
- All-Star Game Starter: Maya Moore
- All-Star Game Reserve: Seimone Augustus and Lindsay Whalen
