= 2014 Atlanta Dream season =

- Head coach: Michael Cooper
- Arena: Philips Arena

Results
- Record: 19–15 (.559)
- Place: 1st (Eastern)
- Playoff finish: Lost Eastern Semis

Media
- Television: FS-S, SSO; ESPN2, NBATV

The 2014 Atlanta Dream season was the 7th season for the Atlanta Dream of the Women's National Basketball Association, and their 1st season under head coach, Michael Cooper. This was also the first season the Dream has finished first in the East. In the last game of the Eastern Semis, the Dream had a 16-point lead at the end of the 3rd quarter, but gave the other team the lead and lost 81–80.

== Transactions ==
=== WNBA draft ===
Round	Pick	Player	Nationality	School/Team/Country
1	8	Shoni Schimmel	United States	Louisville
2	18	Inga Orekhova	Ukraine	South Florida
2	20	Cassie Harberts	United States	USC

=== Trades and Roster Changes ===
Date	Transaction
January 15, 2014	Cored Erika de Souza
March 11, 2014	Extended a Qualifying Offer to Courtney Clements
March 12, 2014	Traded Alex Bentley and a 3rd Round Pick in the 2014 WNBA draft in a 3-Team Trade involving the Washington Mystics and the Connecticut Sun. Bentley went to the Sun, while the 3rd Round Pick went to Washington. Atlanta received Matee Ajavon and a 2nd Round Pick in the 2014 Draft from the Mystics.
March 25, 2014	Signed Samantha Prahlis and Jacki Gemelos to Training Camp Contracts
March 26, 2014	Signed Erika de Souza
March 30, 2014	Signed Nádia Colhado to a Training Camp Contract
April 1, 2014	Signed Courtney Clements to a Training Camp Contract
April 3, 2014	Signed Celine Dumerc
April 4, 2014	Signed Jhasmin Player to a Training Camp Contract
April 10, 2014	Signed Ashley Corral and Amanda Thompson to Training Camp Contracts
April 16, 2014	Signed Shoni Schimmel, Cassie Harberts, and Inga Orekhova to Rookie Scale Contracts
April 23, 2014	Signed Khaalidah Miller to a Training Camp Contract
April 25, 2014	Signed Danielle Wilson and Rebekah Gardner to Training Camp Contracts
April 30, 2014	Waived Danielle Wilson, Ashley Corral, and Jacki Gemelos
May 4, 2014	Waived Khaalidah Miller and Rebekah Gardner
May 7, 2014	Exercised the 4th Year Team Option on Tiffany Hayes
May 7, 2014	Traded Courtney Clements and 2nd Round Pick in the 2015 WNBA draft to the Chicago Sky for Swin Cash and a 3rd Round Pick in the 2015 Draft
May 12, 2014	Waived Jhasmin Player, Samantha Prahlis, and Cassie Harberts
May 15, 2014	Temporarily Suspend Celine Dumerc due to Overseas Commitments
May 30, 2014	Waived Inga Orekhova
June 2, 2014	Activated Celine Dumerc from her Temporary Suspension
July 9, 2014	Traded Swin Cash to the New York Liberty in exchange for Delisha Milton-Jones
August 18, 2014	Signed Sancho Lyttle to a Contract Extension

== Roster ==
2014 Atlanta Dream roster
Players
Coaches

Pos.	No.	Nat.	Name	Height	Weight	From
G	10	(United States)	Ajavon, Matee	5' 8" (1.73m)	160 lb (73kg)	Rutgers
C	31	(Brazil)	Colhado, Nadia	6' 4" (1.93m)	196 lb (89kg)	Brazil
F/C	14	(Brazil)	de Souza, Erika	6' 5" (1.96m)	190 lb (86kg)	Brazil
G	9	(France)	Dumerc, Celine	5' 7" (1.7m)	132 lb (60kg)	France
G	15	(United States)	Hayes, Tiffany	5' 10" (1.78m)	155 lb (70kg)	Connecticut
F/C	13	(Jamaica)	Henry-Morello, Aneika	6' 4" (1.93m)	192 lb (87kg)	Florida
F	20	(Spain)	Lyttle, Sancho	6' 5" (1.96m)	175 lb (79kg)	Houston
G/F	35	(United States)	McCoughtry, Angel	6' 1" (1.85m)	173 lb (78kg)	Louisville
F	1	(United States)	Milton-Jones, Delisha	6' 1" (1.85m)	185 lb (84kg)	Florida
G	23	(United States)	Schimmel, Shoni	5' 9" (1.75m)	161 lb (73kg)	Louisville
G	5	(United States)	Thomas, Jasmine	5' 9" (1.75m)	143 lb (65kg)	Duke
F	21	(United States)	Thompson, Amanda	6' 1" (1.85m)	180 lb (82kg)	Oklahoma

Head coach
(United States) Michael Cooper (New Mexico)
Assistant coaches
(United States) Karleen Thompson (USC)
(United States) Teresa Edwards (Georgia)

Legend

- (C) Team captain
- (DP) Unsigned draft pick
- (FA) Free agent
- (S) Suspended
- Injured

== Schedule ==
=== Preseason ===
2014 Game Log: Preseason
Total: 1–0 (Home: 1–0; Road: 0–0)

1	May 11	@ New York	W 63–58	Tiffany Hayes (14)	Érika de Souza (7)	Shoni Schimmel (4)	Philips Arena; 2444	1–0

2014 season schedule

=== Regular season ===
2014 Game Log: Regular Season
May: 3–2 (Home: 2–1; Road: 1–1)

Game	Date	Time (ET)	Opponent	TV	Score	High points	High rebounds	High assists	Location/Attendance	Record
1	May 16	7:30pm	San Antonio	SSO	W 79-75	de Souza (23)	de Souza (11)	Shoni Schimmel (11)	Philips Arena; 4,575	1-0
2	May 17	7:00pm	@ Indiana	FS-S	W 90-88	McCoughtry (27)	Lyttle (21)	Schimmel (10)	Bankers Life Fieldhouse; 8,275	2-0
3	May 24	8:00pm	@ Chicago		L 73-87	de Souza (18)	de Souza (12)	Schimmel (8)	Allstate Arena; 4,136	2-1
4	May 25	6:00pm	Indiana	SSO	L 77-82	McCoughtry (19)	de Souza (9)	Schimmel (8)	Philips Arena; 5,517	2-2
5	May 30	7:30pm	Seattle	SSO	W 80-69	Hayes (20)	Lyttle (10)	McCoughtry (8)	Philips Arena; 5,486	3-2

June: 9–2 (Home: 7–0; Road: 2–2)

Game	Date	Time (ET)	Opponent	TV	Score	High points	High rebounds	High assists	Location/Attendance	Record
6	June 1	3:00pm	@ Connecticut		L 76-85	Hayes (17)	de Souza (8)	Lyttle (3)	Mohegan Sun Arena; 6,071	3-3
7	June 3	7:00pm	Los Angeles	ESPN2	W 93-85	de Souza (27)	Lyttle (12)	Schimmel (7)	Philips Arena; 5,409	4-3
8	June 7	7:00pm	Chicago	SSO	W 97-59	de Souza, McCoughtry (20)	Lyttle (12)	Dumerc (5)	Philips Arena; 5,458	5-3
9	June 13	7:30pm	Minnesota	SSO	W 85-82	McCoughtry (23)	Lyttle (12)	Dumerc (7)	Philips Arena; 6,684	6-3
10	June 15	4:00pm	@ Washington		W 75-67	de Souza; McCoughtry (16)	de Souza (9)	McCoughtry (5)	Verizon Center; 7,229	7-3
11	June 18	12:00pm	Washington	FS-S	W 83-73	McCoughtry (27)	Lyttle (10)	McCoughtry (4)	Philips Arena; 8,895	8-3
12	June 15	8:00pm	@ Chicago	CN100	W 93-86	Castro Marques (31)	de Souza (13)	Lehning (9)	Allstate Arena; 3,292	9-3
13	June 19	7:00pm	@ Indiana		L 91-94	Catchings, Douglas (17)	Catchings (7)	Catchings (6)	Conseco Fieldhouse; 8,187	9-4
14	June 23	12:00pm	Tulsa	NBATV; SSO; FS-OK	W 96-90	McCoughtry (29)	Lyttle (12)	Castro Marques (8)	Philips Arena; 9,598	10-4
15	June 27	3:00pm	Los Angeles	NBATV; SSO	W 89-81	Castro Marques (25)	Lyttle (11)	Lehning, McCoughtry (5)	Philips Arena; 7,855	11-4
16	June 29	7:00pm	Phoenix	SSO	W 94-88	McCoughtry (18)	Leuchanka (9)	K. Miller (8)	Philips Arena; 4,073	12-4

July: 5–5 (Home: 3–1; Road: 2–4)

Game	Date	Time (ET)	Opponent	TV	Score	High points	High rebounds	High assists	Location/Attendance	Record
17	July 1	7:00pm	Minnesota	SSO	W 76-58	Castro Marques (22)	Lyttle (14)	Lehning (5)	Philips Arena; 4,020	13-4
18	July 3	7:00pm	Chicago	NBATV; SSO	L 82-88	McCoughtry (20)	de Souza (15)	Lyttle, K. Miller (3)	Philips Arena; 6,920	13-5
19	July 7	7:00pm	Connecticut	SSO	W 108-103 (OT)	Castro Marques, McCoughtry (32)	de Souza (13)	Lehning (8)	Philips Arena; 5,305	14-5
20	July 14	1:00pm	@ Minnesota		L 81-83	McCoughtry (25)	de Souza (20)	Lehning (6)	Target Center; 12,311	14-6
21	July 16	7:00pm	@ Indiana		L 70-89	McCoughtry (27)	Leuchanka (7)	Lehning (3)	Conseco Fieldhouse; 7,532	14-7
22	July 17	7:00pm	@ Connecticut		L 80-96	McCoughtry (27)	Lyttle (11)	Castro Marques, Price (5)	Mohegan Sun Arena; 7,378	14-8
23	July 21	11:30am	@ Washington	NBATV; CSN-MA	L 72-82	McCoughtry (23)	Lyttle (8)	Castro Marques (6)	Verizon Center; 14,347	14-9
24	July 25	3:00pm	New York	NBATV; SSO	W 82-75	McCoughtry (28)	de Souza, McCoughtry (10)	McCoughtry (6)	Philips Arena; 7,030	15-9
25	July 27	1:30pm	@ Tulsa	NBATV; COX	W 105-89	Castro Marques (23)	Lyttle (14)	Lehning (6)	BOK Center; 3,800	16-9
26	July 30	7:30pm	@ Connecticut		W 94-62	McCoughtry (20)	de Souza (13)	K. Miller, Price (5)	Mohegan Sun Arena; 7,003	17-9

August: 2–6 (Home: 1–5; Road: 1–1)

Game	Date	Time (ET)	Opponent	TV	Score	High points	High rebounds	High assists	Location/Attendance	Record
27	August 1	3:00pm	Indiana	NBATV; SSO	W 90-74	Castro Marques (22)	Lyttle (8)	Lehning, McCoughtry (7)	Philips Arena; 6,270	18-9
28	August 3	7:30pm	Washington	ESPN2	L 78-86	McCoughtry (30)	Lyttle (9)	Lehning (6)	Philips Arena; 9,072	18-10
29	August 6	7:00pm	@ Indiana		L 93-95	McCoughtry (31)	Lyttle (8)	Lehning (6)	Conseco Fieldhouse; 9,214	18-11
30	August 10	7:00pm	Seattle	FS-S	L 70-80	McCoughtry (16)	Lyttle (17)	Lehning (6)	Philips Arena; 6,042	18-12
31	August 13	7:00pm	New York	SSO	L 83-90	McCoughtry (22)	Lyttle (13)	Lehning (8)	Philips Arena; 6,025	18-13
32	August 14	8:00pm	@ Chicago	CN100	W 92-74	de Souza (17)	Bales (12)	Price (6)	Allstate Arena; 4,214	19-13
33	August 17	7:00pm	Chicago	NBATV; FS-S	L 79-84	Castro Marques (19)	Leuchanka (11)	Lehning, Miller (4)	Philips Arena; 5,209	19-14
34	August 22	3:00pm	Washington	SSO	L 81-90	McCoughtry (19)	Lyttle (11)	Lyttle (6)	Philips Arena; 9,570	19-15

=== Playoffs ===
2014 Game Log: Playoffs
Eastern Semifinals vs. Chicago (Lost Series 1-2)

Game	Date	Opponent	Score	High points	High rebounds	High assists	Location/Attendance	Record
1	August 22	Chicago	L 77-80	Angel McCoughtry (24)	Sancho Lyttle (14)	Shoni Schimmel (6)	Philips Arena; 5,985	0–1
2	August 24	@ Chicago	W 92-83	Angel McCoughtry (39)	Lyttle; Thomas (7)	Jasmine Thomas (6)	Allstate Arena; 4,546	1–1
3	August 26	Chicago	L 80-81	Erika de Souza (18)	Sancho Lyttle (13)	Shoni Schimmel (6)	Philips Arena; 4,829	1–2

2014 season schedule

== Standings ==
#	Eastern Conference					
#	Team	W	L	PCT	GB	GP
1	y- Atlanta Dream	19	15	.559	-	34
2	x- Indiana Fever	16	18	.471	3.0	34
3	x-Washington Mystics	16	18	.471	3.0	34
4	x-Chicago Sky	15	19	.441	4.0	34
5	e-New York Liberty	15	19	.441	4.0	34
6	e-Connecticut Sun	13	21	.382	6.0	34

== Playoffs ==
**Conference semifinals** Best-of-3
E1	Atlanta	1
E4	**Chicago**	**2**
**Eastern Conference**
E2	**Indiana**	**2**
E3	Washington	0
W1	**Phoenix**	**2**
W4	Los Angeles	0
**Western Conference**
W2	**Minnesota**	**2**
W3	San Antonio	0

**Conference finals** Best-of-3
E4	**Chicago**	**2**
E2	Indiana	1
W1	**Phoenix**	**2**
W2	Minnesota	1

**WNBA Finals**; Best-of-5
E4	Chicago	0
W1	**Phoenix**	**3**

- **Bold** – Series winner
- Italics – Team with home-court advantage

== Statistics ==
Legend
GP	Games played	GS	Games started	MPG	Minutes per game	RPG	Rebounds per game
APG	Assists per game	SPG	Steals per game	BPG	Blocks per game	PPG	Points per game
FG%	Field-goal percentage	3P%	3-point field-goal percentage	FT%	Free-throw percentage	TO	Turnovers per game
PF	Fouls per game		Team leader		League leader

=== Regular season ===
Player	GP	GS	MPG	FG%	3P%	FT%	RPG	APG	SPG	BPG	PPG
Angel McCoughtry	31	29	31.4	42.0	29.5	80.9	5.2	3.6	2.4	0.4	18.5
Erika de Souza	33	33	29.9	54.5	0.0	70.6	8.7	1.2	1.1	1.4	13.8
Tiffany Hayes	34	32	28.4	46.6	35.7	76.0	3.0	2.5	1.0	0.3	12.9
Sancho Lyttle	34	34	31.3	45.9	27.3	66.3	9.0	2.4	2.2	0.6	12.2
Shoni Schimmel	34	2	21.3	37.4	34.2	84.0	2.2	3.6	0.8	0.1	8.3
Jasmine Thomas	34	23	17.5	32.3	25.5	71.4	2.1	1.6	0.5	0.1	4.8
Aneika Henry-Morello	34	4	12.8	58.2	0.0	67.6	3.4	0.3	0.2	0.7	4.5
Delisha Milton-Jones	2	0	11.5	28.6	50.0	100.0	1.0	0.0	0.5	1.5	4.5
Celine Dumerc	28	11	18.8	29.5	23.1	69.4	2.0	4.0	1.1	0.1	3.3
Nadia Colhado	16	0	7.9	50.0	0.0	28.6	1.8	0.1	0.3	0.4	2.8
Matee Ajavon	24	1	9.2	27.8	11.1	72.4	0.8	0.7	0.5	0.0	2.2
Amanda Thompson	21	0	8.3	36.1	0.0	83.3	2.1	0.5	0.2	0.5	1.7
Swin Cash	17	1	8.8	23.3	0.0	40.0	0.9	0.7	0.4	0.2	1.5
Inga Orekhova	2	0	6.5	0.0	0.0	0.0	0.5	0.0	0.0	1.0	0.0

=== Playoffs ===
Player	GP	GS	MPG	FG%	3P%	FT%	RPG	APG	SPG	BPG	PPG
Angel McCoughtry	3	3	35.0	43.3	44.4	92.3	6.0	3.3	2.7	0.3	26.7
Tiffany Hayes	3	3	30.7	48.1	33.3	90.0	3.0	2.0	0.3	0.3	12.7
Erika de Souza	3	3	27.7	56.7	0.0	50.0	5.3	0.7	0.3	0.7	12.7
Sancho Lyttle	3	3	36.3	39.4	0.0	66.7	11.3	3.3	1.0	1.0	9.3
Jasmine Thomas	3	2	22.7	42.1	33.3	62.5	3.0	3.3	0.7	0.0	7.3
Shoni Schimmel	3	0	19.3	36.8	37.5	100.0	2.7	5.7	1.0	0.0	6.3
Aneika Henry-Morello	3	0	16.3	72.7	0.0	75.0	2.3	0.3	0.7	0.0	6.3
Celine Dumerc	1	1	28.0	66.7	50.0	0.0	3.0	5.0	1.0	0.0	5.0
Matee Ajavon	2	0	3.5	0.0	0.0	0.0	1.0	0.5	0.0	0.0	0.0

== Awards and honors ==
Recipient	Award	Date awarded	Ref.
Angel McCoughtry	Eastern Conference Player of the Week	June 23	
Angel McCoughtry	Eastern Conference Player of the Week	July 14	
Angel McCoughtry	Eastern Conference Player of the Month - June	June 30	
Angel McCoughtry	All-Star Selection	July 8	
Angel McCoughtry	All-WNBA Second Team	September 11	
Angel McCoughtry	All-Defensive First Team	August 22	
Shoni Schimmel	Eastern Conference Player of the Week	August 18	
Shoni Schimmel	All-Star Selection	July 8	
Shoni Schimmel	All-Star MVP	July 19	
Erika de Souza	Eastern Conference Player of the Week	June 10	
Erika de Souza	All-Star Selection	July 8	
Sancho Lyttle	Eastern Conference Player of the Week	June 30	
Sancho Lyttle	All-Defensive First Team	August 22	
