= List of first overall WNBA draft picks =

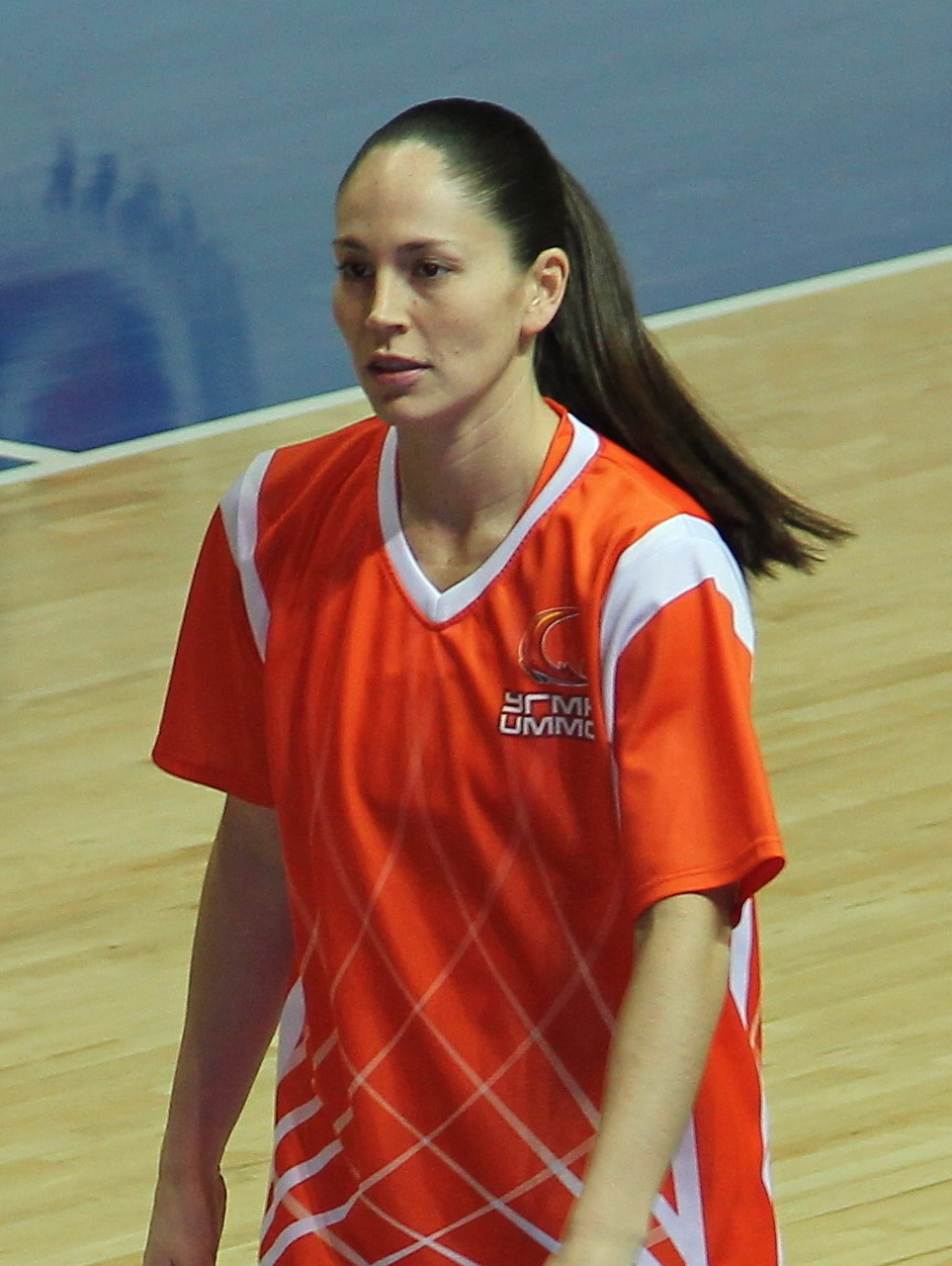
The 2002 first overall draft pick, Sue Bird. She was also the first pick from Connecticut as the first overall.

The Women's National Basketball Association's first overall pick is the player who is selected first among all eligible draftees by a team during the annual Women's National Basketball Association (WNBA) draft. The first pick is awarded to the team that wins the WNBA draft lottery; in most cases, that team had a losing record in the previous season.

Eight first picks have won the WNBA Most Valuable Player Award: Lauren Jackson (three-time winner), Candace Parker (two-time winner), Diana Taurasi, Tina Charles, Maya Moore, Nneka Ogwumike, Breanna Stewart (two-time winner), and A'ja Wilson (four-time winner). Parker is the only player to win the WNBA Most Valuable Player Award during her rookie year.

Sixteen first picks have won the WNBA Rookie of the Year Award: Chamique Holdsclaw, Diana Taurasi, Seimone Augustus, Candace Parker, Angel McCoughtry, Tina Charles, Maya Moore, Nneka Ogwumike, Chiney Ogwumike, Jewell Loyd, Breanna Stewart, A'ja Wilson, Rhyne Howard, Aliyah Boston, Caitlin Clark, and Paige Bueckers. Three of these made the All-WNBA first team as a rookie: Taurasi, Parker, and Clark. Six others were All-WNBA second team selections as rookies: Augustus, Charles, Moore, Stewart, Wilson, and Bueckers.

Four collegiate programs have multiple players that were selected first overall: UConn with seven, Tennessee with three, and Notre Dame, South Carolina and Stanford with two each.

== Key ==
!	Denotes player who has been inducted to the Naismith Basketball Hall of Fame
^	Denotes player who has been inducted to the Women's Basketball Hall of Fame
*	Denotes player who has been selected for at least one All-Star Game and All-WNBA Team
^{+}	Denotes player who has been selected for at least one All-Star Game
**Bold**	Denotes player who won Rookie of the Year

PPG	Points per game
APG	Assists per game
RPG	Rebounds per game

== List of first overall picks ==
Draft	Selected by	Player	Country	Position	College / former club	WNBA rookie statistics (Note: All statistics are from player's rookie season, unless otherwise noted)			Ref.
Draft	Selected by	Player	Country	Position	College / former club	PPG	RPG	APG	Ref.
1997 (Elite) (Note: The elite draft portion comprised professional women's basketball players who had competed in other leagues.)	Utah Starzz	Dena Head	USA	Guard	Tennessee	5.7	2.3	1.7	
1997	Houston Comets	Tina Thompson * ^ !	USA	Forward	USC	13.2	6.6	1.1	
1998	Utah Starzz	Margo Dydek ^{+}	POL	Center	Pool Getafe (Spain)	12.9	7.6	1.8	
1999	Washington Mystics	**Chamique Holdsclaw** * ^ !	USA	Forward	Tennessee	16.9	7.9	2.4	
2000	Cleveland Rockers	Ann Wauters ^{+}	BEL	Center	USV Olympic (France)	6.2	4.0	1.2	
2001	Seattle Storm	Lauren Jackson * ^ !	AUS	Forward-Center	Canberra Capitals (Australia)	15.2	6.7	1.5	
2002	Seattle Storm	Sue Bird * ^ !	USA	Guard	Connecticut	14.4	2.6	6.0	
2003	Cleveland Rockers	LaToya Thomas	USA	Forward	Mississippi State	10.8	5.1	1.2	
2004	Phoenix Mercury	**Diana Taurasi** *	USA	Forward	Connecticut	17.0	4.4	3.9	
2005	Charlotte Sting	Janel McCarville	USA	Center	Minnesota	1.8	2.7	0.4	
2006	Minnesota Lynx	**Seimone Augustus** * ^ !	USA	Forward	LSU	**21.9**	3.8	1.5	
2007	Phoenix Mercury	Lindsey Harding	USA	Guard	Duke	11.7	4.4	3.9	
2008	Los Angeles Sparks	**Candace Parker** * ^ !	USA	Forward	Tennessee	18.5	9.5	3.4	
2009	Atlanta Dream	**Angel McCoughtry** *	USA	Forward	Louisville	12.8	3.1	2.1	
2010	Connecticut Sun	**Tina Charles** *	USA	Center	Connecticut	15.5	**11.7**	1.5	
2011	Minnesota Lynx	**Maya Moore** * ^ !	USA	Forward	Connecticut	13.2	4.6	2.6	
2012	Los Angeles Sparks	**Nneka Ogwumike** *	USA	Forward	Stanford	14.0	7.5	1.2	
2013	Phoenix Mercury	Brittney Griner *	USA	Center	Baylor	12.6	6.3	1.0	
2014	Connecticut Sun	**Chiney Ogwumike** ^{+}	USA	Forward	Stanford	15.5	8.5	0.6	
2015	Seattle Storm	**Jewell Loyd** *	USA	Guard	Notre Dame	10.7	3.5	1.9	
2016	Seattle Storm	**Breanna Stewart** *	USA	Forward	Connecticut	18.3	9.3	3.4	
2017	San Antonio Stars	Kelsey Plum *	USA	Guard	Washington	8.5	1.9	3.4	
2018	Las Vegas Aces	**A'ja Wilson** *	USA	Forward	South Carolina	20.7	8.0	2.2	
2019	Las Vegas Aces	Jackie Young *	USA	Guard	Notre Dame	6.6	3.3	4.5	
2020	New York Liberty	Sabrina Ionescu *	USA	Guard	Oregon	18.3	4.7	4.0	
2021	Dallas Wings (Note: Acquired from New York via Seattle)	Charli Collier	USA	Center	Texas	3.4	3.6	0.2	
2022	Atlanta Dream (Note: Acquired from Washington)	**Rhyne Howard** ^{+}	USA	Guard	Kentucky	16.2	4.5	2.8	
2023	Indiana Fever	**Aliyah Boston** *	USA	Center	South Carolina	14.5	8.4	2.2	
2024	Indiana Fever	**Caitlin Clark** *	USA	Guard	Iowa	19.2	5.7	**8.4**	
2025	Dallas Wings	**Paige Bueckers** *	USA	Guard	Connecticut	19.2	3.9	5.4	
2026	Dallas Wings	Azzi Fudd	USA	Guard	Connecticut	13.1	1.7	1.8	
2027	Toronto Tempo								

== First overall picks by WNBA team ==
The Las Vegas Aces have held the first overall pick a total of five times, the most of any WNBA team. This includes the Aces time as the Utah Starzz and the San Antonio Stars. The Charlotte Sting, Cleveland Rockers, and Houston Comets are the only defunct franchises to have held a first overall pick. The Chicago Sky, Portland Fire, and Golden State Valkyries are the only active teams that have never had the first overall pick. The Miami Sol, Portland Fire, and Sacramento Monarchs are the only defunct franchises that have never had the first overall pick.

Team	Picks	Year(s)	Notes
Las Vegas Aces	5	1997 (Elite) (Note: The elite draft portion comprised professional women's basketball players who had competed in other leagues.), 1998, 2017, 2018, 2019	2 as the Las Vegas Aces; 2 as the Utah Starzz; 1 as the San Antonio Stars
Seattle Storm	4	2001, 2002, 2015, 2016	
Phoenix Mercury	3	2004, 2007, 2013	
Dallas Wings	3	2021, 2025, 2026	
Atlanta Dream	2	2009, 2022	
Cleveland Rockers	2	2000, 2003	
Connecticut Sun	2	2010, 2014	
Indiana Fever	2	2023, 2024	
Los Angeles Sparks	2	2008, 2012	
Minnesota Lynx	2	2006, 2011	
Charlotte Sting	1	2005	
Houston Comets	1	1997	
New York Liberty	1	2020	
Toronto Tempo	1	2027	
Washington Mystics	1	1999	

== First overall picks by school ==
Connecticut has the most first overall picks with 7. Tennessee has the second-most first overall picks with 3. South Carolina, Notre Dame, and Stanford each have the third-most first overall picks with 2. Only one school have had first overall picks in consecutive years, having done it twice: Connecticut with Tina Charles (2010), and Maya Moore (2011), and with Paige Bueckers (2025), and Azzi Fudd (2026).

School	Total	Year(s)
Connecticut	7	2002, 2004, 2010, 2011, 2016, 2025, 2026
Tennessee	3	1997, (Elite) (Note: The elite draft portion comprised professional women's basketball players who had competed in other leagues.), 1999, 2008
Notre Dame	2	2015, 2019
South Carolina	2	2018, 2023
Stanford	2	2012, 2014
Baylor	1	2013
Canberra Capitals (Australia)	1	2001
Duke	1	2007
Iowa	1	2024
Kentucky	1	2022
Louisville	1	2009
LSU	1	2006
Minnesota	1	2005
Mississippi State	1	2003
Oregon	1	2020
Pool Getafe (Spain)	1	1998
Texas	1	2021
USC	1	1997
USV Olympic (France)	1	2000
Washington	1	2017

== First overall picks by position ==
Position	Number of selections	Last year selected
Center	8	2023
Forward	13	2018
Guard	12	2026

== See also ==
- List of first overall NWSL draft picks
- List of first overall PWHL draft picks
- List of first overall NBA draft picks
- List of first overall NBA G League draft picks
