= Tricia Liston =

American basketball player (born 1992)

No. 20 – Bucheon KEB Hana Bank
- Position: Guard
- League: Women's Korean Basketball League

Personal information
- Born: February 20, 1992 (age 34) Chicago, Illinois, U.S.
- Listed height: 6 ft 1 in (1.85 m)
- Listed weight: 166 lb (75 kg)

Career information
- High school: Fenwick (Oak Park, Illinois)
- College: Duke (2010–2014)
- WNBA draft: 2014: 1st round, 12th overall pick
- Drafted by: Minnesota Lynx
- Playing career: 2014–present

Career history
- 2014–2015: Minnesota Lynx
- 2016–present: Bucheon KEB Hana Bank

Career highlights
- WNBA champion (2015); Third-team All-American – AP (2014); First-team All-ACC (2014); Illinois Miss Basketball (2010)
- Stats at WNBA.com
- Stats at Basketball Reference
Medals
Women's basketball
Representing United States
World University Games
Gold medal – first place	2013 Kazan	Team

Patricia Maureen Liston (born February 20, 1992) is an American professional basketball player. Born in Chicago, Illinois, she is a graduate of Fenwick High School in Oak Park, Illinois. She was drafted in 2014 by the Minnesota Lynx of the WNBA.

== USA Basketball ==
Liston was selected to be a member of the team representing the US at the 2013 World University Games held in Kazan, Russia. The team, coached by Sherri Coale, won the opening four games easily, scoring in triple digits in each game, and winning by 30 or more points in each case. After winning the quarterfinal game against Sweden, they faced Australia in the semifinal. The USA team opened up as much as a 17 point in the fourth quarter of the game but the Australian team fought back and took a one-point lead in the final minute. Crystal Bradford scored a basket with 134 seconds left ant he game to secure a 79–78 victory. The gold medal opponent was Russia, but the USA team never trailed, and won 90–71 to win the gold medal and the World University games Championship. Liston averaged 8.2 points, hitting 64% of her field goal attempts.

== Duke statistics ==
Legend
GP	Games played	GS	Games started	MPG	Minutes per game
FG%	Field goal percentage	3P%	3-point field goal percentage	FT%	Free throw percentage
RPG	Rebounds per game	APG	Assists per game	SPG	Steals per game
BPG	Blocks per game	PPG	Points per game	**Bold**	Career high

Year	Team	GP	Points	FG%	3P%	FT%	RPG	APG	SPG	BPG	PPG
2010–11	Duke	32	177	45.8	38.9	69.0	2.1	0.9	0.6	0.1	5.5
2011–12	Duke	33	397	48.6	46.0	86.7	3.9	1.5	**1.3**	0.0	12.0
2012–13	Duke	**36**	487	44.8	46.5	**93.1**	5.1	1.4	1.0	0.1	13.5
2013–14	Duke	35	**603**	**52.5**	**48.1**	85.2	**5.2**	**1.6**	0.6	**0.2**	**17.2**
Career	Duke	136	1664	48.4	45.9	85.6	4.1	1.4	0.9	0.1	12.2

== WNBA ==
Liston made her WNBA debut on May 16, 2014. Liston was waived by the Lynx in April 2016.

== WNBA career statistics ==
Legend
GP	Games played	GS	Games started	MPG	Minutes per game	RPG	Rebounds per game
APG	Assists per game	SPG	Steals per game	BPG	Blocks per game	PPG	Points per game
TO	Turnovers per game	FG%	Field-goal percentage	3P%	3-point field-goal percentage	FT%	Free-throw percentage
**Bold**	Career best	°	League leader

†	Denotes seasons in which Liston won a WNBA championship

=== Regular season ===
Year	Team	GP	GS	MPG	FG%	3P%	FT%	RPG	APG	SPG	BPG	TO	PPG
2014	Minnesota	25	0	7.2	.400	**.467**	.667	**1.1**	0.3	0.0	**0.1**	0.1	2.2
2015^{†}	Minnesota	**31**	**2**	**12.0**	**.420**	.429	**1.000**	1.0	**0.7**	**0.3**	0.0	0.3	**3.4**
Career	2 years, 1 team	56	2	9.9	.413	.441	.875	1.1	0.6	0.2	0.1	0.2	2.8

=== Playoffs ===
Year	Team	GP	GS	MPG	FG%	3P%	FT%	RPG	APG	SPG	BPG	TO	PPG
2014	Minnesota	2	0	**1.0**	.000	000	000	0.0	0.0	0.0	0.0	0.0	0.0
2015^{†}	Minnesota	**3**	0	0.7	.000	.000	**.333**	0.0	0.0	0.0	0.0	0.0	**0.3**
Career	2 years, 1 team	5	0	0.8	.000	.000	.333	0.0	0.0	0.0	0.0	0.0	0.2
