= Amanda Thompson (basketball) =

American basketball player (born 1987)

Personal information
- Born: November 18, 1987 (age 38) Chicago, Illinois, U.S.
- Listed height: 6 ft 1 in (1.85 m)
- Listed weight: 170 lb (77 kg)

Career information
- High school: Whitney Young (Chicago, Illinois)
- College: Oklahoma (2006–2010)
- WNBA draft: 2010: 2nd round, 19th overall pick
- Drafted by: Tulsa Shock
- Playing career: 2010–present
- Position: Forward

Career history
- 2010: Tulsa Shock
- 2014: Atlanta Dream

Career highlights
- BSNF Defensive Player of the Year (2015); First-team All-Big 12 (2010); Big 12 All-Freshman Team (2007); McDonald's All-American (2006)
- Stats at WNBA.com
- Stats at Basketball Reference

Amanda Clara Thompson (born November 18, 1987) is an American professional basketball player who played for the Atlanta Dream of the WNBA. She had previously played college basketball for the University of Oklahoma before being drafted by the Tulsa Shock in the 2010 WNBA draft.

== Career statistics ==
Legend
GP	Games played	GS	Games started	MPG	Minutes per game	RPG	Rebounds per game
APG	Assists per game	SPG	Steals per game	BPG	Blocks per game	PPG	Points per game
TO	Turnovers per game	FG%	Field-goal percentage	3P%	3-point field-goal percentage	FT%	Free-throw percentage
**Bold**	Career best	°	League leader

=== WNBA ===
==== Regular season ====
WNBA regular season statistics
Year	Team	GP	GS	MPG	FG%	3P%	FT%	RPG	APG	SPG	BPG	TO	PPG
2010	Tulsa	7	0	7.0	14.3	—	70.0	1.6	0.4	**0.4**	0.0	0.6	1.6
2011	Did not play (waived)												
2012	Did not play (did not appear in WNBA)												
2013	Did not play (did not appear in WNBA)												
2014	Atlanta	**21**	0	**8.3**	**36.1**	—	**83.3**	**2.1**	**0.5**	0.2	**0.5**	0.6	**1.7**
**Career**	2 years, 2 teams	28	0	8.0	30.0	—	77.3	2.0	0.5	0.3	0.4	0.6	1.7

=== College ===
NCAA statistics
Year	Team	GP	Points	FG%	3P%	FT%	RPG	APG	SPG	BPG	PPG
2006-07	Oklahoma	33	187	39.0	-	56.4	5.2	1.6	0.6	0.6	5.7
2007-08	Oklahoma	31	275	40.3	**42.9**	**83.3**	6.5	2.4	1.6	**1.1**	8.9
2008-09	Oklahoma	36	244	**41.3**	23.3	70.7	4.6	1.9	1.2	0.9	6.8
2009-10	Oklahoma	**38**	**496**	41.1	30.4	82.2	**10.5**	**2.6**	**1.8**	0.9	**13.1**
**Career**		138	1202	40.6	29.3	73.9	6.8	2.1	1.3	0.9	8.7
