= Tyaunna Marshall =

American basketball player

Personal information
- Born: December 22, 1992 (age 33) Washington, D.C., U.S.
- Listed height: 5 ft 9 in (1.75 m)

Career information
- High school: Elizabeth Seton (Bladensburg, Maryland)
- College: Georgia Tech (2010–2014)
- WNBA draft: 2014: 2nd round, 14th overall pick
- Drafted by: New York Liberty
- Playing career: 2014–present
- Position: Guard

Career highlights
- 2× First-team All-ACC (2013, 2014); 2× ACC All-Defensive Team (2013, 2014); ACC All-Freshman Team (2011)
- Stats at Basketball Reference

Tyaunna Marshall (born December 22, 1992) is an American professional basketball player who most recently played for Indiana Fever in the Women's National Basketball Association. She is known for her rebounding ability as a guard. She played college basketball at Georgia Tech and is the Yellow Jackets women's basketball career leading scorer. Marshall was drafted in the second round of the 2014 WNBA draft by the New York Liberty, but was released before the 2014 WNBA season. On February 10, 2015, Marshall signed with the Indiana Fever.

After stints in Italy and Romania, in the 2020 season she pursued pro basketball in Hungary, at KSC Szekszárd. In 2021 she began playing with PEAC-Pécs of the Hungarian league.

== Georgia Tech statistics ==
Legend
GP	Games played	GS	Games started	MPG	Minutes per game
FG%	Field goal percentage	3P%	3-point field goal percentage	FT%	Free throw percentage
RPG	Rebounds per game	APG	Assists per game	SPG	Steals per game
BPG	Blocks per game	PPG	Points per game	**Bold**	Career high

Year	Team	GP	Points	FG%	3P%	FT%	RPG	APG	SPG	BPG	PPG
2010–11	Georgia Tech	**35**	475	**47.6**	28.6	58.0	4.2	1.9	1.7	0.4	13.6
2011–12	Georgia Tech	**35**	503	44.6	33.3	**67.7**	6.2	2.3	1.7	0.5	14.4
2012–13	Georgia Tech	30	542	45.0	11.1	56.8	**8.4**	2.8	2.6	0.3	18.1
2013–14	Georgia Tech	31	**609**	47.6	**36.8**	64.0	7.6	**3.1**	**2.7**	**0.6**	**19.6**
Career	Georgia Tech	131	2129	46.2	27.8	61.7	6.5	2.5	2.2	0.5	16.3
