= 2010 New York Liberty season =

- Head coach: Anne Donovan
- Arena: Madison Square Garden

Results
- Record: 22–12 (.647)
- Place: 2nd (Eastern)
- Playoff finish: Lost Conference Finals

Media
- Television: MSG; NBATV, ESPN2

The 2010 WNBA season was the 14th season for the New York Liberty of the Women's National Basketball Association.

== Transactions ==
=== Dispersal draft ===
Based on the Liberty's 2009 record, they would pick 1st in the Sacramento Monarchs dispersal draft. The Liberty picked Nicole Powell.

=== WNBA draft ===
The following are the Liberty's selections in the 2010 WNBA draft.

Round	Pick	Player	Nationality	School/team/country
2	13	Kalana Greene	United States	Connecticut
2	16 (from Chi.)	Ashley Houts	United States	Georgia
3	25	Cory Montgomery	United States	Nebraska

=== Transaction log ===
- May 5, 2009: The Liberty traded their first-round pick in the 2010 Draft to the Los Angeles Sparks in exchange for Sidney Spencer.
- March 30: The Liberty traded Shameka Christon and Cathrine Kraayeveld to the Chicago Sky in exchange for the Sky's second-round pick in the 2010 Draft. The Liberty also received Cappie Pondexter and Kelly Mazzante from the Phoenix Mercury as part of the three-team trade.
- April 6: The Liberty waived Loree Moore.
- April 8: The Liberty waived Kelly Mazzante.
- April 20: The Liberty released Ashley Battle.
- April 22: The Liberty signed free agent Taj McWilliams-Franklin.
- April 23: The Liberty signed Brandie Hoskins, Laine Selwyn, Tamara James, April Phillips, Katie Mattera and Erica Williamson to training camp contracts.
- April 28: The Liberty waived Brandie Hoskins.
- May 3: The Liberty waived Laine Selwyn.
- May 4: The Liberty waived Katie Mattera.
- May 9: The Liberty waived Cory Montgomery and Tamara James.
- May 12: The Liberty traded Ashley Houts to the Washington Mystics in exchange for Nikki Blue.
- June 14: The Liberty traded Tiffany Jackson to the Tulsa Shock in exchange for Plenette Pierson.

=== Trades ===
Date	Trade	
May 5, 2009	To New York Liberty	To Los Angeles Sparks
May 5, 2009	Sidney Spencer	first-round pick in 2010 Draft
March 30, 2010	To New York Liberty	To Chicago Sky
March 30, 2010	Cappie Pondexter, Kelly Mazzante (from Phx.) and Chicago's second-round pick in 2010 Draft	Shameka Christon and Cathrine Kraayeveld
June 14, 2010	To New York Liberty	To Tulsa Shock
June 14, 2010	Plenette Pierson	Tiffany Jackson

=== Free agents ===
==== Additions ====
Player	Signed	Former team
Nicole Powell	December 14, 2009	Sacramento Monarchs
Cappie Pondexter	March 30, 2010	Phoenix Mercury
Taj McWilliams-Franklin	April 22, 2010	Tulsa Shock
Nikki Blue	May 12, 2010	Washington Mystics
Plenette Pierson	July 23, 2010	Tulsa Shock

==== Subtractions ====
Player	Left	New team
Shameka Christon	March 30, 2010	Chicago Sky
Cathrine Kraayeveld	March 30, 2010	Chicago Sky
Loree Moore	April 6, 2010	Seattle Storm
Ashley Battle	April 20, 2010	free agent
Tiffany Jackson	July 23, 2010	Tulsa Shock

== Roster ==
2010 New York Liberty roster
Players
Coaches

Pos.	No.	Nat.	Name	Height	Weight	From
PG	1	(United States)	Blue, Nikki	5' 8" (1.73m)	163 lb (74kg)	UCLA
G/F	17	(United States)	Carson, Essence	6' 0" (1.83m)	165 lb (75kg)	Rutgers
G	32	(United States)	Greene, Kalana	5' 10" (1.78m)	170 lb (77kg)	Connecticut
C	4	(United States)	McCarville, Janel	6' 2" (1.88m)	205 lb (93kg)	Minnesota
F	7	(United States)	McWilliams-Franklin, Taj	6' 2" (1.88m)	188 lb (85kg)	St. Edward's University
PG	5	(United States)	Mitchell, Leilani	5' 5" (1.65m)	130 lb (59kg)	Utah
SF	33	(United States)	Pierson, Plenette	6' 2" (1.88m)	178 lb (81kg)	Texas Tech
SG	23	(United States)	Pondexter, Cappie	5' 9" (1.75m)	160 lb (73kg)	Rutgers
F	14	(United States)	Powell, Nicole	6' 2" (1.88m)	175 lb (79kg)	Stanford
G/F	6	(United States)	Spencer, Sidney	6' 3" (1.91m)	183 lb (83kg)	Tennessee
C	15	(United States)	Vaughn, Kia	6' 4" (1.93m)	200 lb (91kg)	Rutgers

Head coach
(United States) Anne Donovan (Old Dominion)
Assistant coaches
(United States) Laurie Byrd (Eastern Michigan)
(United States) Catherine Proto (Springfield)
Athletic trainer
(United States) Lisa White (Stony Brook)
Strength and conditioning coach
(United States) Kevin Duffy

Legend

- (C) Team captain
- (DP) Unsigned draft pick
- (FA) Free agent
- (S) Suspended
- Injured

WNBA roster page

=== Depth ===
Pos.	Starter	Bench
C	Taj McWilliams-Franklin	Kia Vaughn
PF	Janel McCarville	Plenette Pierson
SF	Nicole Powell	Kalana Greene / Sidney Spencer
SG	Cappie Pondexter	Essence Carson
PG	Leilani Mitchell	Nikki Blue

== Season standings ==
Eastern Conference	W	L	PCT	GB	Home	Road	Conf.
Washington Mystics ^{x}	22	12	.647	–	13–4	9–8	13–9
New York Liberty ^{x}	22	12	.647	–	13–4	9–8	14–8
Indiana Fever ^{x}	21	13	.618	1.0	13–4	8–9	13–9
Atlanta Dream ^{x}	19	15	.559	3.0	10–7	9–8	10–12
Connecticut Sun ^{o}	17	17	.500	5.0	12–5	5–12	9–13
Chicago Sky ^{o}	14	20	.412	8.0	7–10	7–10	7–15

== Schedule ==
=== Preseason ===
2010 Game Log: Preseason

Game	Date	Time (ET)	Opponent	Score	High points	High rebounds	High assists	Location/Attendance	Record
1	May 5	11:30am	@ Washington	60-65	McWilliams-Franklin (12)	McWilliams-Franklin (11)	Mitchell (4)	Verizon Center; 7,152	0-1
2	May 11	10:30am	Connecticut	89-84 (3OT)	Greene, Pondexter (14)	Pondexter (11)	Pondexter (8)	Madison Square Garden; 19,763	1-1

=== Regular season ===
2010 Game Log: Regular Season
May

Game	Date	Time (ET)	Opponent	TV	Score	High points	High rebounds	High assists	Location/Attendance	Record
1	May 16	4:00pm	Chicago	NBATV; MSG; CN100	85-82	Pondexter (22)	McCarville (6)	Mitchell (9)	Madison Square Garden; 12,088	1-0
2	May 21	7:00pm	@ Washington		61-77	Pondexter (14)	Powell (7)	Pondexter (8)	Verizon Center; 10,158	1-1
3	May 23	4:00pm	Atlanta		77-86	Pondexter (21)	McCarville (9)	Mitchell, Pondexter, Powell (5)	Madison Square Garden; 9,548	1-2
4	May 28	8:00pm	@ San Antonio		77-71	Pondexter (21)	McCarville, Powell (7)	Pondexter (7)	AT&T Center; 5,293	2-2

June

Game	Date	Time (ET)	Opponent	TV	Score	High points	High rebounds	High assists	Location/Attendance	Record
5	June 4	7:00pm	@ Connecticut		68-75	McCarville, McWilliams-Franklin (14)	McCarville (13)	McCarville (5)	Mohegan Sun Arena; 6,493	2-3
6	June 5	7:00pm	@ Indiana		73-78	Pondexter (21)	Pondexter (7)	Pondexter (5)	Conseco Fieldhouse; 8,090	2-4
7	June 8	8:00pm	@ Chicago	CN100	85-70	Pondexter (31)	McWilliams-Franklin (9)	McWilliams-Franklin, Pondexter, Powell (3)	Allstate Arena; 2,408	3-4
8	June 11	7:30pm	Atlanta		91-79	Pondexter (25)	Jackson, McWilliams-Franklin (6)	Pondexter (7)	Madison Square Garden; 8,332	4-4
9	June 12	7:00pm	@ Washington	CSN-MA	65-82	Pondexter (20)	McCarville (6)	Pondexter (3)	Verizon Center; 8,492	4-5
10	June 18	7:30pm	Seattle		84-92	Pondexter (24)	Powell (6)	Mitchell (5)	Madison Square Garden; 8,883	4-6
11	June 22	7:30pm	Minnesota		68-75	Pondexter (16)	Powell (9)	Pondexter (5)	Madison Square Garden; 7,537	4-7
12	June 25	8:00pm	@ Tulsa	COX	92-78	Mitchell (20)	McWilliams-Franklin (11)	McWilliams-Franklin, Powell (6)	BOK Center; 4,554	5-7
13	June 27	4:00pm	Connecticut	CSN-NE	77-68	Pondexter (19)	Powell (10)	McWilliams-Franklin (5)	Madison Square Garden; 15,293	6-7
14	June 29	10:30pm	@ Los Angeles	NBATV; PRIME	80-68	Pondexter (19)	McWilliams-Franklin, Powell (7)	Mitchell, Pondexter (5)	STAPLES Center; 8,602	7-7

July

Game	Date	Time (ET)	Opponent	TV	Score	High points	High rebounds	High assists	Location/Attendance	Record
15	July 3	10:00pm	@ Phoenix		82-97	Pondexter (21)	McCarville, Pierson, Pondexter (6)	Mitchell (5)	US Airways Center; 6,780	7-8
16	July 6	3:00pm	@ Seattle		70-78	McWilliams-Franklin (20)	McWilliams-Franklin (10)	Pondexter (5)	KeyArena; 11,012	7-9
17	July 11	4:00pm	Chicago	MSG	57-54	Pondexter (30)	McWilliams-Franklin, Pondexter (8)	McCarville (4)	Madison Square Garden; 9,644	8-9
18	July 15	12:00pm	Washington		75-67	Pondexter (17)	McCarville (12)	Pondexter (7)	Madison Square Garden; 18,162	9-9
19	July 18	4:00pm	Indiana	MSG	81-84 (OT)	Pondexter (40)	McCarville, Pondexter (6)	Pondexter (7)	Madison Square Garden; 9,508	9-10
20	July 20	8:00pm	@ Connecticut	ESPN2	82-74 (OT)	Pondexter (24)	McCarville, Mitchell (8)	Pondexter (6)	Mohegan Sun Arena; 6,478	10-10
21	July 23	8:30pm	@ Chicago	CN100	79-71	McWilliams-Franklin (18)	Powell (7)	Pondexter (6)	Allstate Arena; 5,256	11-10
22	July 25	3:00pm	@ Atlanta	NBATV; SSO	75-82	Pondexter (26)	Pierson (6)	Pondexter (6)	Philips Arena; 7,030	11-11
23	July 27	7:30pm	San Antonio	ESPN2	77-72	Greene (17)	Pierson (8)	Mitchell (8)	Madison Square Garden; 10,712	12-11
24	July 30	7:30pm	Los Angeles		88-79	Pondexter (20)	McWilliams-Franklin (9)	Mitchell (5)	Madison Square Garden; 14,307	13-11

August

Game	Date	Time (ET)	Opponent	TV	Score	High points	High rebounds	High assists	Location/Attendance	Record
25	August 1	4:00pm	Connecticut	MSG	71-67	Pondexter (24)	McCarville, Pierson (6)	Powell (5)	Madison Square Garden; 9,341	14-11
26	August 3	7:00pm	@ Indiana	FS-I	82-72	Powell (20)	McCarville (10)	Pondexter (5)	Conseco Fieldhouse; 7,540	15-11
27	August 6	7:30pm	Washington		85-77	Pondexter (23)	McCarville (5)	Mitchell (6)	Madison Square Garden; 11,465	16-11
28	August 8	7:00pm	@ Minnesota	NBATV; FS-N	74-72	Powell (21)	McCarville (8)	Mitchell, Pondexter, Powell (4)	Target Center; 9,016	17-11
29	August 13	7:00pm	@ Atlanta	SSO	90-83	Pondexter (31)	Carson (7)	McWilliams-Franklin (7)	Philips Arena; 6,025	18-11
30	August 14	7:30pm	Phoenix	NBATV; MSG	107-69	Pondexter (28)	Pierson (9)	McCarville (6)	Madison Square Garden; 9,645	19-11
31	August 17	7:30pm	Indiana		78-57	Pondexter (19)	McWilliams-Franklin (10)	Pondexter (6)	Madison Square Garden; 8,953	20-11
32	August 19	7:30pm	Tulsa		95-85	Powell (20)	Pierson (8)	Mitchell (8)	Madison Square Garden; 8,766	21-11
33	August 20	7:00pm	@ Washington		74-75	Pondexter (28)	McCarville, McWilliams-Franklin, Powell (6)	Powell (5)	Verizon Center; 13,109	21-12
34	August 22	4:00pm	Connecticut	MSG	88-87 (OT)	Pondexter (31)	Powell (8)	Pondexter (6)	Madison Square Garden; 15,989	22-12

All games are viewable on WNBA LiveAccess

=== Postseason ===
2010 Game Log: Postseason
Eastern Conference Semifinals

Game	Date	Time (ET)	Opponent	TV	Score	High points	High rebounds	High assists	Location/Attendance	Series
1	August 26	7:00pm	Indiana	NBATV; MSG	85-73	Pondexter (28)	McWilliams-Franklin (10)	McCarville (7)	Madison Square Garden; 14,624	1-0
2	August 29	8:00pm	@ Indiana	ESPN2	67-75	Pondexter (24)	McCarville (11)	Mitchell, Pondexter (2)	Conseco Fieldhouse; 7,535	1-1
3	September 1	7:30pm	Indiana	NBATV; MSG	77-74	Pondexter (30)	McWilliams-Franklin (11)	McWilliams-Franklin, Mitchell, Pondexter (4)	Madison Square Garden; 16,682	2-1

Eastern Conference Finals

Game	Date	Time (ET)	Opponent	TV	Score	High points	High rebounds	High assists	Location/Attendance	Series
1	September 5	7:00pm	Atlanta	NBATV; MSG	75-81	Pondexter (24)	McWilliams-Franklin (11)	Mitchell (6)	Madison Square Garden; 14,248	0-1
2	September 7	7:30pm	@ Atlanta	NBATV; MSG; FSSO	93-105	Pondexter (36)	McWilliams-Franklin (6)	Pondexter (9)	Philips Arena; 9,045	0-2

== Statistics ==
Legend
GP	Games played	GS	Games started	MPG	Minutes per game	RPG	Rebounds per game
APG	Assists per game	SPG	Steals per game	BPG	Blocks per game	PPG	Points per game
FG%	Field-goal percentage	3P%	3-point field-goal percentage	FT%	Free-throw percentage	TO	Turnovers per game
PF	Fouls per game		Team leader		League leader

=== Regular season ===
Player	GP	GS	MPG	FG%	3P%	FT%	RPG	APG	SPG	BPG	PPG
Nikki Blue	15	0	5.1	.286	.167	.714	0.4	0.9	0.27	0.00	1.2
Essence Carson	34	0	9.6	.407	.160	.688	1.6	0.7	0.41	0.24	3.7
Kalana Greene	33	0	15.7	.464	.333	.625	1.6	0.9	0.39	0.21	4.5
Tiffany Jackson	9	0	13.8	.370	.000	.760	3.1	0.4	0.7	0.1	4.3
Janel McCarville	34	34	28.4	.462	.273	.820	5.9	2.2	1.35	0.68	8.8
Taj McWilliams-Franklin	34	34	29.2	.511	.261	.826	5.4	2.0	1.38	0.88	10.6
Leilani Mitchell	34	34	28.8	.441	.486	.814	2.6	3.8	1.62	0.18	9.3
Plenette Pierson	25	0	16.7	.458	.250	.817	3.8	1.1	0.68	0.32	9.0
Cappie Pondexter	34	34	34.3	.483	.430	.892	4.5	4.9	0.88	0.12	21.4
Nicole Powell	34	34	26.3	.389	.395	.839	4.2	2.2	1.00	0.21	9.3
Sidney Spencer	20	0	8.4	.512	.533	.000	0.8	0.3	0.30	0.00	2.6
Kia Vaughn	30	0	8.1	.348	1.000	.650	1.4	0.3	0.20	0.20	2.1

== Awards and honors ==
- Cappie Pondexter was named WNBA Eastern Conference Player of the Week for the week of June 5, 2010.
- Cappie Pondexter was named WNBA Eastern Conference Player of the Week for the week of July 17, 2010.
- Cappie Pondexter was named WNBA Eastern Conference Player of the Week for the week of July 24, 2010.
- Cappie Pondexter was named WNBA Eastern Conference Player of the Week for the week of August 7, 2010.
- Cappie Pondexter was named WNBA Eastern Conference Player of the Week for the week of August 14, 2010.
- Cappie Pondexter was named WNBA Eastern Conference Player of the Month for August.
- Cappie Pondexter was named to the 2010 WNBA All-Star Team as a Team USA starter.
- Kalana Greene was named to the All-Rookie Team.
- Cappie Pondexter was named to the All-Defensive First Team.
- Cappie Pondexter was named to the All-WNBA First Team.
- Leilani Mitchell was named the Most Improved Player.
