= WNBA draft lottery =

To determine first-round draft order

The WNBA draft lottery is an annual event held since 2002 by the Women's National Basketball Association (WNBA), in which the teams who had missed the playoffs the previous year participate in a lottery process to determine the draft order in the first round of the WNBA draft.

== Procedure ==
In 2026, the five teams that had the worst combined winning percentage in each of the last two previous WNBA seasons were eligible for each year's WNBA draft lottery which is used to determine the first five picks in each WNBA draft. Come 2027, the number of teams meeting this criterion will increase to seven.

The lottery itself is conducted by choosing combinations of four ping-pong balls numbered 1 through 14 from a lottery machine. There are 1,001 possible combinations of four digits, from which four combinations out of the 1,000 are assigned to all five lottery teams. The 11-12-13-14 combination is ignored and left unassigned. For each of the top two picks, four balls are drawn from a lottery machine. Whichever team has been assigned that four-ball combination will receive the No. 1 pick in the draft. The draw is repeated for the No. 2 pick. The three teams who are not drawn in the lottery are given the Nos. 3-5 picks in reverse order of their winning percentage. Ernst & Young knows the discreet results before the announcement.
