= Asya Bussie =

American professional basketball player

Personal information
- Born: April 16, 1991 (age 35) Baltimore, Maryland, U.S.
- Listed height: 6 ft 3 in (1.91 m)

Career information
- High school: Seton Keough (Baltimore, Maryland)
- College: West Virginia (2009–2014)
- WNBA draft: 2014: 2nd round, 15th overall pick
- Drafted by: Minnesota Lynx
- Position: Center

Career highlights
- Big 12 All-Defensive Team (2014; First-team All-Big 12 (2014); First-team All-Big East (2012); Big East All-Freshman Team (2010)
- Stats at Basketball Reference

Asya Breyana Bussie (born April 16, 1991) is an American professional basketball player. Born in Baltimore, Maryland, she was drafted in 2014 by the Minnesota Lynx of the WNBA.

== West Virginia statistics ==
Legend
GP	Games played	GS	Games started	MPG	Minutes per game
FG%	Field goal percentage	3P%	3-point field goal percentage	FT%	Free throw percentage
RPG	Rebounds per game	APG	Assists per game	SPG	Steals per game
BPG	Blocks per game	PPG	Points per game	**Bold**	Career high

Year	Team	GP	Points	FG%	3P%	FT%	RPG	APG	SPG	BPG	PPG
2009–10	West Virginia	**35**	354	47.2	–	56.2	5.5	0.5	**1.4**	2.1	10.1
2010–11	West Virginia	34	354	**50.0**	–	63.3	4.7	0.6	0.9	1.6	8.2
2011–12	West Virginia	34	412	53.2	–	58.9	6.6	0.9	1.2	**2.1**	12.1
2012–13	West Virginia	–	–	–	–	–	–	–	–	–	–
2013–14	West Virginia	**35**	**453**	48.8	–	**69.1**	**7.8**	**1.3**	1.1	2.0	**12.9**
Career	West Virginia	138	1573	49.8	0.0	62.2	6.2	0.8	1.2	2.0	11.4
