= Janel McCarville =

American basketball player (born 1982)

Personal information
- Born: November 3, 1982 (age 44) Stevens Point, Wisconsin, U.S.
- Listed height: 6 ft 2 in (1.88 m)
- Listed weight: 225 lb (102 kg)

Career information
- High school: Stevens Point Area (Stevens Point, Wisconsin)
- College: Minnesota (2001–2005)
- WNBA draft: 2005: 1st round, 1st overall pick
- Drafted by: Charlotte Sting
- Playing career: 2005–2016
- Position: Center

Career history
- 2005–2006: Charlotte Sting
- 2006–2008: Good Angels Košice
- 2007–2012: New York Liberty
- 2010–2011: Spartak MR
- 2011–2012: Famila Wüber Schio
- 2012–2013: Canik Belediyesi
- 2013–2014: Minnesota Lynx
- 2013–2014: CCC Polkowice
- 2014–2015: Liaoning Hengye
- 2015–2016: AGÜ Spor
- 2016: Minnesota Lynx
- 2017: AIK Basket
- 2018: Alvik Basket

Career highlights
- WNBA champion (2013); EuroLeague champion (2010); WNBA Most Improved Player (2007); 2× Kodak All-American (2004, 2005); All-American – USBWA (2005); Second-team All-American – AP (2005); 3× First-team All-Big Ten (2003–2005); Big Ten Freshman of the Year (2002); Big Ten All-Freshman Team (2002); No. 4 jersey retired by Minnesota Golden Gophers
- Stats at WNBA.com
- Stats at Basketball Reference
Medals
Women's basketball
Representing the United States
Pan American Games
Silver medal – second place	2003 Santo Domingo	Team

Janel McCarville (born November 3, 1982) is an American former professional basketball player from Custer, Wisconsin who is currently an assistant coach for the Minnesota Lynx.

== Early life ==
Born in Stevens Point, Wisconsin, McCarville attended Stevens Point Area Senior High (SPASH), where she led her school to a 59–11 record over her final three years.

As a senior, McCarville averaged 19.4 ppg and led her team to a runner-up finish in the 2001 Wisconsin Division I State Tournament. She had tournament averages of 21.7 ppg and 14.7 rpg. She shared the Wisconsin Player of the Year award with Mistie Williams (née Bass) and was honored as an AAU All-American and a member of the 2001 all-state first team.

== College career ==
McCarville was a standout collegiate women's basketball player for the University of Minnesota (Twin Cities). She was named the Freshman of the Year in the Big Ten for the 2001-02 season.

McCarville started all four years during her time with the Golden Gophers.

McCarville is in the all-time top five of every major statistical category for the Golden Gophers' women's team, including points, rebounds, assists, steals, and blocks. McCarville holds the NCAA record for most rebounds in the tournament, with 75 rebounds in five games. She also holds the NCAA record for tournament rebound average, with 15 per game.

In 2019, she became the seventh player to have a banner in the rafters at Williams Arena on the University of Minnesota campus.

== Minnesota statistics ==
Legend
GP	Games played	GS	Games started	MPG	Minutes per game
FG%	Field goal percentage	3P%	3-point field goal percentage	FT%	Free throw percentage
RPG	Rebounds per game	APG	Assists per game	SPG	Steals per game
BPG	Blocks per game	PPG	Points per game	**Bold**	Career high

Year	Team	GP	Points	FG%	3P%	FT%	RPG	APG	SPG	BPG	PPG
2001-02	Minnesota	30	391	58.0	-	73.2	8.0	2.0	1.5	1.0	13.0
2002-03	Minnesota	30	384	**65.7**	-	69.8	9.0	1.2	2.0	1.2	12.8
2003-04	Minnesota	**34**	**548**	61.6	-	**78.5**	**10.8**	2.9	**2.9**	1.9	**16.1**
2004-05	Minnesota	32	512	50.2	**15.0**	72.9	10.6	**3.7**	2.2	**2.1**	16.0
Career	Minnesota	126	1835	58.0	11.1	74.0	9.7	2.5	2.2	1.6	14.6

== WNBA career ==
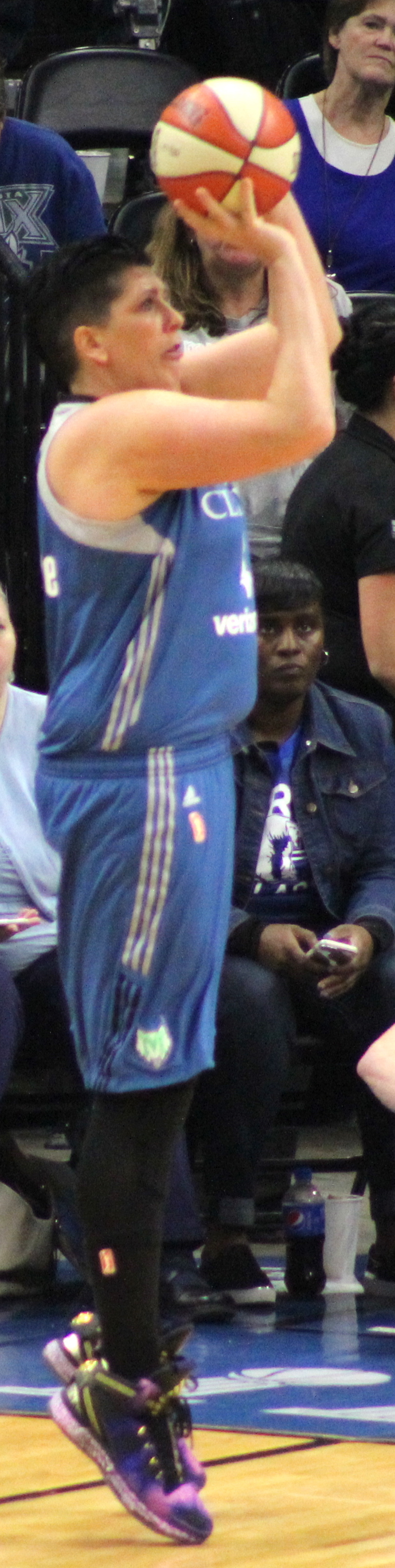
McCarville shooting at the WNBA Finals 2016

In the 2005 WNBA draft, McCarville was picked by Charlotte Sting as the No. 1 overall selection. At Charlotte, she missed a number of games due to injury. When she was able to play, her performance did not meet the expectations associated with the No. 1 draft pick.

In the spring of 2007, after the Sting folded, McCarville was claimed by New York in the 2007 dispersal draft. During the first half of the 2007 season she earned a place in the Liberty starting lineup, displacing rookie Jessica Davenport. On August 25, 2007, McCarville was named most improved player of the 2007 season.

McCarville continued to play for the Liberty in 2008. She was named WNBA Eastern Conference Player of the Week on two occasions during the 2008 season.

In 2011, McCarville decided to not report to training camp, and in accordance with WNBA rules, was suspended for the entire season. This became a point of division for the team's fan base.

On April 16, 2012, it was announced that McCarville intended to take the summer off from basketball in order to spend time with her family.

On March 1, 2013, the Minnesota Lynx acquired McCarville as part of a three-team trade. McCarville filled the void left by the retirement of Taj McWilliams-Franklin, providing a veteran post presence. McCarville also rejoined Gopher teammate Lindsay Whalen, the starting point guard for the Lynx.

McCarville's play improved as the season went along. McCarville helped the team to its second title in three years, and her first as a pro, scoring 10 points in the decisive third game of the 2013 WNBA Finals.

On May 13, 2015, it was announced that McCarville would not be participating in the 2015 WNBA season, primarily due to back pain.

McCarville played her final WNBA season in 2016 with the Lynx.

In 2023, McCarville was named to the Minnesota Lynx All-25 Team (top 25 players) as part of the team's 25th anniversary.

== WNBA career statistics ==
Legend
GP	Games played	GS	Games started	MPG	Minutes per game	RPG	Rebounds per game
APG	Assists per game	SPG	Steals per game	BPG	Blocks per game	PPG	Points per game
TO	Turnovers per game	FG%	Field-goal percentage	3P%	3-point field-goal percentage	FT%	Free-throw percentage
**Bold**	Career best	°	League leader

†	Denotes seasons in which McCarville won a WNBA championship

=== Regular season ===
Year	Team	GP	GS	MPG	FG%	3P%	FT%	RPG	APG	SPG	BPG	TO	PPG
2005	Charlotte	28	3	11.1	.340	.000	.640	2.7	0.4	0.4	0.3	0.8	1.8
2006	Charlotte	30	3	14.1	.458	.000	.636	3.5	0.8	0.6	0.7	0.9	4.5
2007	New York	32	21	21.2	**.546**	.000	.833	4.8	1.1	1.2	0.6	2.5	10.4
2008	New York	31	31	26.3	.535	.000	.774	5.4	2.1	**1.5**	0.8	2.2	**13.7**
2009	New York	32	32	26.5	.502	.333	**.841**	5.5	2.8	1.3	**1.4**	2.7	12.3
2010	New York	**34**	**34**	**28.4**	.462	.273	.820	**5.9**	2.2	1.4	0.7	2.5	8.8
2013^{†}	Minnesota	32	32	21.9	.488	**.429**	.804	4.3	2.9	1.0	0.7	1.3	6.3
2014	Minnesota	**34**	**34**	27.1	.457	.333	.738	4.8	**3.1**	1.2	0.9	1.7	7.0
2016	Minnesota	33	0	12.6	.457	.182	.600	2.5	1.6	0.6	0.3	0.7	3.3
Career	9 years, 3 teams	286	190	21.3	.491	.278	.774	4.4	1.9	1.0	0.7	1.7	7.7

=== Playoffs ===
Year	Team	GP	GS	MPG	FG%	3P%	FT%	RPG	APG	SPG	BPG	TO	PPG
2007	New York	3	3	**32.7**	.415	.000	.571	5.7	3.3	**2.7**	1.3	3.0	**14.0**
2008	New York	6	6	27.5	**.493**	.000	.565	5.2	1.3	1.0	**1.5**	3.2	13.8
2010	New York	2	2	31.5	.300	.000	**1.000**	**9.0**	**4.0**	1.5	1.0	3.0	5.0
2013^{†}	Minnesota	**7**	**7**	24.7	.486	**.500**	.625	5.0	3.4	1.1	1.1	2.4	5.7
2014	Minnesota	5	5	24.0	.481	.333	.667	4.4	1.8	0.0	0.2	1.6	5.8
2016	Minnesota	4	0	4.8	.400	.000	.000	1.0	0.3	0.0	0.0	0.3	1.0
Career	6 years, 2 teams	27	3	23.6	.460	.286	.615	4.7	2.2	0.9	0.9	2.2	7.7

== USA Basketball ==
McCarville was a member of the United States team that won a silver medal at the 2003 Pan American Games in Santo Domingo, Dominican Republic. McCarville averaged 4.3 points per game.

== International career ==
During the 2006-2007 and 2007-2008 EuroLeague seasons, McCarville played for Good Angels Košice, Slovakia with former Charlotte Sting teammate Kelly Mazzante. In the fall of 2007, McCarville was named to the USA Select basketball team and helped that team take second place in the 2007 FIBA World League tournament. During the winter of 2009–2010, McCarville played for the Spartak Moscow Women's Basketball team. During the winters of 2010–2011 and 2011–2012, McCarville played for the Famila Schio Women's Basketball team. On September 12, 2012, The Canik Belediyesi basketball club was announced as having signed McCarville, as well as Detroit Shock veteran Cheryl Ford. McCarville Joined CCC Polkowice in 2013. From February 2014 to October 2015, McCarville played center on the Kayseri (Turkey) AGU Spor team in the Turkish women's premier basketball league (KBSL). From July 2014 to July 2015, she played for AIK Basket Solna in Sweden.

== Coaching career ==
While playing for Swedish Alviks Basketklubb, McCarville also worked as an assistant coach for the club's men's and women's teams. In 2022, she returned to Stevens Point to coach the girls' junior varsity basketball team at her high school alma mater, and then in 2022 she became head coach of the Stevens Point varsity girls' team. In 2026, McCarville returned to the Minnesota Lynx as an assistant coach, joining a coaching staff that includes former teammates Lindsay Whalen and Rebekkah Brunson. Cheryl Reeve said about McCarville's return as a coach: “I’m excited because J-Mac was not one of our people that we flagged as definitely going to get into coaching....as a player she was pretty much anti-authority of any kind, including her coaches, so it’s really interesting to see her on this side of it."
