= Inga Orekhova =

Ukrainian basketball player (born 1989)

Personal information
- Born: 10 November 1989 (age 37) Sevastopol, Ukraine
- Listed height: 6 ft 2 in (1.88 m)
- Listed weight: 160 lb (73 kg)

Career information
- High school: The Bishop's School (La Jolla, California)
- College: Northeast Oklahoma CC (2010–2011); South Florida (2011–2014)
- WNBA draft: 2014: 2nd round, 18th overall pick
- Drafted by: Atlanta Dream
- Playing career: 2014–present
- Position: Guard

Career history
- 2014: Atlanta Dream
- 2015: Connecticut Sun
- Stats at WNBA.com
- Stats at Basketball Reference

Inga Orekhova (born 10 November 1989) is a Ukrainian professional basketball player who last played for the Connecticut Sun of the WNBA. The Dream waived her in early June. On May 14, 2015, Orekhova signed with the Connecticut Sun

== Early life ==
Orekhova played basketball at The Bishop's School in La Jolla, California, where she graduated in 2010.

== USF career ==
Orekhova was the 20th USF women's basketball player to score 1,000 career points. She shot 89 percent (65-for-73) in one season, a USF single-season record.

=== South Florida statistics ===
Legend
GP	Games played	GS	Games started	MPG	Minutes per game
FG%	Field goal percentage	3P%	3-point field goal percentage	FT%	Free throw percentage
RPG	Rebounds per game	APG	Assists per game	SPG	Steals per game
BPG	Blocks per game	PPG	Points per game	**Bold**	Career high

Year	Team	GP	Points	FG%	3P%	FT%	RPG	APG	SPG	BPG	PPG
2011-12	South Florida	20	259	33.7%	30.6%	76.6%	2.4	1.0	1.6	1.0	**13.0**
2012-13	South Florida	33	**419**	34.2%	34.2%	79.8%	3.9	2.6	**1.7**	**1.1**	12.7
2013-14	South Florida	**34**	394	**35.3%**	**36.7%**	89.0%	4.2	**2.7**	0.8	0.7	11.6
Career		87	1072	34.5%	34.0%	82.4%	3.6	2.3	1.3	0.9	12.3
