= Lenape High School =

High school in Burlington County, New Jersey, US

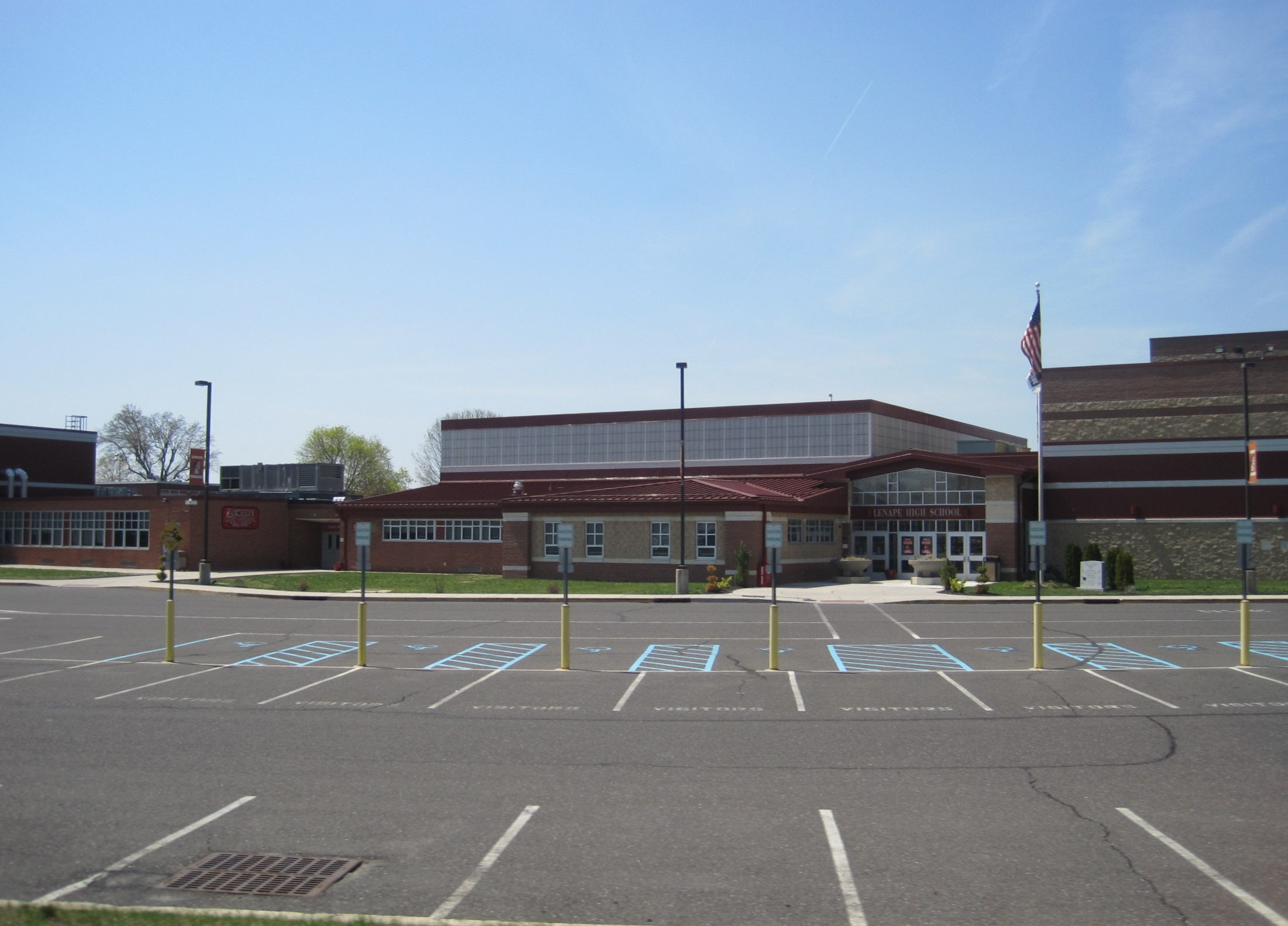

Location
- 235 Hartford Road; Medford, New Jersey, (Burlington County) 08055; United States
- Coordinates: 39.920366°N 74.852901°W

Information
- Type: Public high school
- Established: 1958
- School district: Lenape Regional High School District
- NCES School ID: 340849001094
- Principal: Tony Cattani
- Faculty: 148.5 FTEs
- Enrollment: 1,912 (as of 2024–25)
- Student to teacher ratio: 12.9:1
- Colors: Red and gray
- Athletics conference: Olympic Conference (general); West Jersey Football League (football)
- Team name: Indians
- Accreditation: Middle States Association of Colleges and Schools
- Newspaper: Smoke Signal
- Yearbook: The Legend
- Website: lenape.lrhsd.org

Lenape High School is a four-year comprehensive public high school located in Medford in Burlington County, in the U.S. state of New Jersey. It is the oldest of the four high schools that comprise the Lenape Regional High School District, which serves students in ninth through twelfth grades from Evesham Township, Medford Lakes, Medford, Mount Laurel, Shamong Township, Southampton Township, Tabernacle Township and Woodland Township. Since opening in 1958, the school has served students from Mount Laurel Township. The school has been accredited by the Middle States Association of Colleges and Schools Commission on Elementary and Secondary Schools since 1963, with accreditation expiring in July 2029.

As of the 2024–25 school year, the school had an enrollment of 1,912 students and 148.5 classroom teachers (on an FTE basis), for a student–teacher ratio of 12.9:1. There were 357 students (18.7% of enrollment) eligible for free lunch and 73 (3.8% of students) eligible for reduced-cost lunch.

== History ==
After the regional district was formed in 1955, a plot covering 50 acres (20 ha) in Medford was selected in June 1956 as a site for the school, which was estimated to cost $2 million (equivalent to $24 million in 2025). Lenape High School opened in September 1958, before which students from Medford, Medford Lakes and Tabernacle Township had attended Rancocas Valley Regional High School. Starting with 548 students in freshman and sophomore classes, the school grew quickly. Lenape draws its student body from Mount Laurel.

Students, starting in the fall 2008, attended classes based on the letter of the day. Days could range from a-e, and each student's schedule may be different for each letter. This allowed students never to miss too many classes. For example, in past years, students with lab days on Fridays would have fewer lab days when it would be a three-day weekend because school was not in session on Friday. With the letter days, students schedules rotate and eliminate this issue by having a student have lab on a specific letter day.

The current system that the high school employs is not much different from the letter schedule, but is significantly shortened. This is similar to the college system and helps prepare those for college. The school now relies upon a 4-day schedule with a total of eight periods, two of which are dropped every day. This way, a student's schedule rotates through four different options, having class periods 1, 2, 3, and 4 in the morning block, and having periods 5, 6, 7 and 8 in the afternoon, leaving out a morning and afternoon class each day. Every student, regardless of grade, also attends lunch at the same time, which is commonly known as Lunch and Learn. This time is not only utilized for lunch and social purposes, but for kids to receive extra help during their lunch from teachers who are available or meet with clubs and other activities. Each class is approximately one hour long.

== Awards, recognition and rankings ==
The school was the 79th-ranked public high school in New Jersey out of 339 schools statewide in New Jersey Monthly magazine's September 2014 cover story on the state's "Top Public High Schools", using a new ranking methodology. The school had been ranked 143rd in the state of 328 schools in 2012, after being ranked 122nd in 2010 out of 322 schools listed. The magazine ranked the school 120th in 2008 out of 316 schools. The school was ranked 134th in the magazine's September 2006 issue, which surveyed 316 schools across the state.

Schooldigger.com ranked the school tied for 128th out of 381 public high schools statewide in its 2011 rankings (an increase of 6 positions from the 2010 ranking) which were based on the combined percentage of students classified as proficient or above proficient on the mathematics (84.3%) and language arts literacy (95.4%) components of the High School Proficiency Assessment (HSPA).

== Athletics ==
The Lenape High School Indians compete in the Olympic Conference, which is comprised of public and private high schools in Burlington and Camden counties and operates under the supervision of the New Jersey State Interscholastic Athletic Association (NJSIAA). With 1,437 students in grades 10-12, the school was classified by the NJSIAA for the 2019–20 school year as Group IV South for most athletic competition purposes, which included schools with an enrollment of 1,060 to 5,049 students in that grade range. The football team competes in the American Division of the 94-team West Jersey Football League superconference and was classified by the NJSIAA as Group V South for football for 2024–2026, which included schools with 1,333 to 2,324 students. Lenape High School also has a separate club ultimate and ice hockey teams. The ice hockey team is member of the South Jersey High School Ice Hockey League.

The softball team won the South II state sectional title in 1972, the South sectional title in 1973-1975, was overall state champion in 1974 (defeating Westfield High School in the finals) and won the Group IV state title in 1981 (vs. Eastside High School). The 1981 team finished the season with a 21-2 record after winning the Group IV state title with a 5-4 one-hitter against Eastside in the championship game. The 1974 team finished the season 15-1 after winning the overall state championship against runner-up Westfield.

The girls bowling team was overall state champion in 1980 (as co-champion with South Plainfield High School) and 1982. The 1980 team was tied for first place with 2,424 pins with South Plainfield. The 1982 team won the state title outright with a total of 2,590 pins, 44 ahead of Toms River High School North in second place.

The girls' lacrosse team won the overall state championship in 1981 (defeating Collingswood High School in the tournament final), and won the Group IV title in both 2007 (vs. Montclair High School) and 2014 (vs. Ridge High School); the program's three grouptitles are tied for tenth in the state. The team won the 2007 Group IV state championship with an 11–7 win against Montclair in the championship game.

The boys' wrestling team won the South Jersey Group IV state sectional championship in 1986, 1987 and 1989.

The girls' gymnastics team has won the team state championship in 1987, 1988 and 1990; the three titles are the most of any public school in the state.

The boys' soccer team won the Group IV state championship in 1996, against Randolph High School in the finals of the tournament.

The boys' track team won the indoor relay state championship in Group IV in 1998 (as co-champion).The girls team won the Group IV title in 2008, 2011 and 2012. The team won the Group IV indoor track state championship in 1999 (as co-champion) and 2000. The girls team won the Group IV state title in 2008.

The field hockey team won the Central Jersey Group IV state championship in 2000, 2003, 2017 and 2019. Lenape won the 2003 Central Jersey Group IV sectional championship in field hockey, edging Cherokee High School 2–1 in the tournament final.

The boys' track team won the Group IV spring / outdoor track state championship in 2000.

The boys' basketball team won the Group IV state championship in 2004 (defeating runner-up Plainfield High School in the final game of the tournament) and 2009 (vs. Paterson Eastside) The 2004 boys' basketball won the South Jersey, Group IV championship, defeating Atlantic City High School 66–51. The team moved on to win the 2004 Group IV state championship with a 63-46 win over Plainfield High School. The 2009 boys' basketball team won the NJSIAA South Group IV title and went on to win the program's second Group IV state championship by defeating Eastside High School (of Paterson) by a score of 68–48 at Rutgers University.

The girls' soccer team won the Group IV state championship in 2007 (defeating Bridgewater-Raritan High School in the finals of the tournament), 2008 (vs. Ridge High School), 2009 (vs. Westfield High School), 2020 (vs. Livingston High School) and 2011 (vs. Ridge). The program's five state titles are tied for tenth-most in the state and the five consecutive titles are the second-longest streak. The girls' soccer team won the South Jersey Group IV title in 2004 with a 3–1 win over Washington Township High School. In 2007, the team won the South, Group IV state sectional championship with a 3–2 win over Toms River High School North in the tournament final. The team moved on to win the 2007 Group IV state championship with a 3–0 win over Bridgewater-Raritan in the playoff finals at The College of New Jersey to finish the season with a 22-2-1 record. Lenape girls soccer team won the 2008–09 state championship against Ridge High School, 1–0 to top off a perfect season at 25–0–0. The team won their third consecutive state championship with a 1–0 win over Westfield High School in the 2009–10 season. The team won their fourth consecutive state championship in the 2010–11 season, the first Group IV team to achieve this accomplishment, with a 5-2 win over Livingston High School. Lenape girls soccer is led by Coaches Kevin Meder and Tony Guerrara.

The 2008 Lenape boys' bowling squad featured one of the best individual seasons in high school bowling history. Class of 2011 member Anthony Scerati averaged 235.67 during the season, which included a perfect 300 game, and an 803 series. He also took the singles title at the Holiday tournament, firing a 772 series.

The girls' spring track team was the Group IV state champion in 2015.

The girls' basketball team won the Group IV state championship in 2016 (with a win against John F. Kennedy High School (Paterson) in the finals of the tournament) and 2024 (vs. Morristown High School). The 2016 team won the program's first state title with a 50-35 win against J.F.K High School (Paterson).

The football team won the South Jersey Group V state sectional championship in 2017. In fall 1996, the Lenape football team pulled off the biggest upset in South Jersey football history by defeating Washington Township High School, the top-ranked team in South Jersey and top five in the state, coming back from 14-2 to win 21-14. In the fall of 1997 Lenape won the Olympic Conference in football and spent most of the season ranked #1 in South Jersey. The team won its first state sectional title, defeating Rancocas Valley Regional High School in the 2017 South Jersey Group V state sectional championship game on a field goal scored with five seconds on the clock to give top-seeded Lenape the 10-7 win over the Rancocas Valley Regional High School, the tournament's second seed.

== Extracurricular activities ==
Lenape High School has participated at the Princeton Model Congress, a four-day conference with over 50 schools from around the country. The team placed first at Princeton Model Congress four of the past six years. They brought home the James Madison Award in the most recent 2006 Princeton Model Congress.

Lenape is known for its academic / scientific clubs; Math Team, Science League, and Knowledge Bowl. Science League competes in the New Jersey Science League. Last year the Earth Science team brought home a plaque for ninth place in the state. The Science League also competes in the Merck State Science Day. Knowledge Bowl consists of two "A" teams comprised of Juniors and Seniors, and one "B" team of the two other classes. The team competes in the Gateway Toyota tournament at Monsignor Donovan High School, NORJAC, which is at Leonia High School, the Burlington County Academic Tournament, which is usually held at Cherokee High School, as well as the Allentown tournament, held in Allentown, New Jersey. Last year, the B team brought home second place and the Gateway Toyota, second at the BCAT, and first at the Allentown Tournament. In November 2010, Lenape placed first in the Gateway Toyota Academic Tournament. Later, that December, Lenape placed third in the NORJAC tournament.

The STORM Robotics Team is a collection of FIRST teams. FIRST Robotics Competition Team 2729, FIRST Tech Challenge Team 4390, and FIRST Tech Challenge Team 7433 are open for anyone to join from Lenape High School or its sister school Cherokee High School. Founded in the 2009 season, the team has made it to the FIRST Championship three times (2008-2009, 2012-2013, 2017–2018) and received the Highest Rookie Seed award in the 2008-2009 season. At the Washington DC Competition STORM received the Rookie AllStar award. In 2011 the FRC team won the "AutoDesk Excellence in 3D Animation" award' at the New Jersey Regional Competition. In 2013 the FRC team won the "Engineer Excellence Award" at that years Hatboro competition, the "District's Chairman Award" at the Lenape competition, along with being the winners for the district at the Lenape competition, and the Mid-Atlantic Robotics Region Champion, finally rounding out the year as the 15th seed in the FIRST Championship's Galileo Division. In 2018 the team won the "Engineering Inspiration Award" at the Westtown competition, as well as the runner up equivalent at the Mid-Atlantic District Championship. The team rounded out the year as the 20th seed in the FIRST Championship's Daly Division, as well as the Gracious Professionalism award in that same division.

In addition the school allows any club to be created as long as the student with the idea finds an interest and a teacher to supervise.

=== Marching band ===
The Lenape High School Marching Band has won multiple championships in State and National competitions. In 2004, they were United States Scholastic Band Association (USSBA) group 2A All-States champions, and in 2005 they were Cavalcade of Bands American A Champions. In 2006, they placed third in the state in group 2A at USSBA state championships and third with best color guard at USSBA all-states championships. Their 2007 show was "Four Seasons" which went undefeated within the Group 2A class in the USSBA circuit, with a 92.0 championship winning performance. In 2008, they once again, became the Group II A Class All-States Champions with a score of 94.1, with their show entitled "I Write the Songs," a tribute to Barry Manilow. In 2009 the band won the New Jersey 2A state championships, capturing their first state championship in the USSBA circuit, and went on to place second at All-States Championships. In 2010, the marching band held on to their title as NJ State Champions in the USSBA circuit's 2A group with their show "It's About Time." Due to scheduling conflicts with the All States Championships for 2A, the band opted to move up a group to 3A and performed in Allentown where they came in at a respectable fifth place and took the High Visual award. In 2011, with their show "True Colors", the marching band finished an undefeated season by retaining their title as USSBA Group 2A NJ State Champions for the third consecutive year, and by winning the USSBA Group 2A National Championship with the highest score in the band's history 96.413. The band continued the championship streak by winning the 2012 USBands Group 2 Open New Jersey State Title with their "World Tour" show before going on to place second at the National Championship. In 2013, the band placed second at the New Jersey State and National Championships. In 2014, with "It's A Jungle Out There" show, the band completed an undefeated season with the USBands Group 2 OPEN New Jersey state championship and the National Title with a new best high score of 96.425. "Lenape High School marching band wins fourth straight New Jersey State Band title", South Jersey Local News, December 12, 2012. Accessed May 26, 2013. "Lenape High School's marching band continued its winning streak on Sat., Nov. 10, in Washington Township, capturing the New Jersey State Band title for the fourth straight year. In 2015, with "Desert Winds", Lenape won the USBands Group 2 Open New Jersey State Title and placed second at the National Championships. In 2016, with "Bon Appetit!", Lenape won the USBands Group 2 Open New Jersey State Title.. In 2017, Lenape's marching band again won the USBands Group 2 Open New Jersey State Title with their show "Abracadabra." The band won New Jersey State Titles in 2018, 2019, 2021 and 2022 along with the 2022 Group I OPEN USBands National Championship.

In addition to competitions, the band performs at school football games, the Medford Halloween Parade, Mount Laurel Day, and the Vincentown Memorial Day Parade and has performed in the Miss America Parade since 2014.

The Lenape Marching Band also had previously won Class I Championships in 1993 and 1994 and Class II Championships in 1996 and 1997 as part of the Eastern Marching Band Association.

== Administration ==
The school's principal is Tony Cattani. His administration team includes eight assistant principals.

== Notable alumni ==
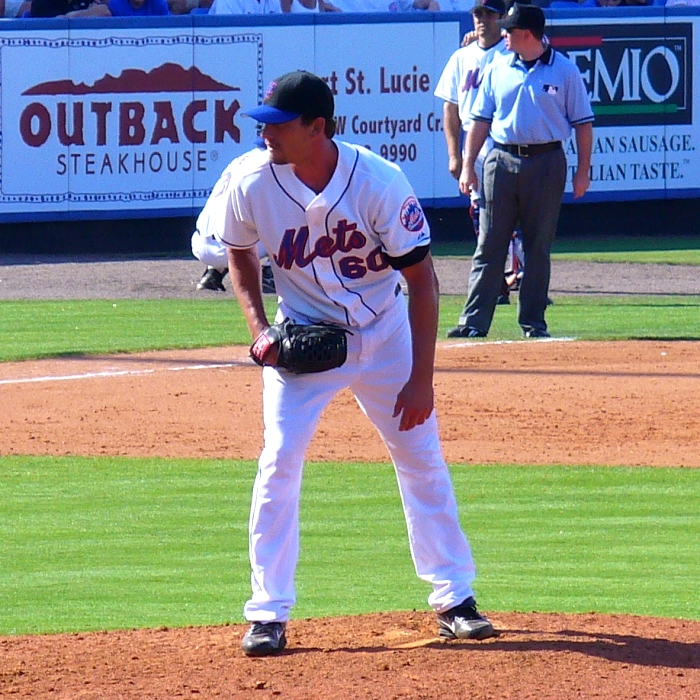
Scott Schoeneweis

- Chris DeStefano, Grammy Award-winning singer/songwriter, record producer and multi instrumentalist
- Christina Foggie (born 1992), professional basketball player drafted in 2014 by the Minnesota Lynx of the WNBA
- Darlene Hill (born 1989, class of 2007), retired artistic gymnast
- Lauren Pfeiffer (born 1987), field hockey player who represented the United States in international competition
- Scott Schoeneweis (born 1973), relief pitcher for the Boston Red Sox
- Michael Slager (born 1983), police officer convicted of murder in the 2015 killing of Walter Scott in South Carolina
- Slushii (born 1997), stage name of disc jockey and electronic music producer, Julian Scanlan
- Jason Thompson (born 1986, class of 2004), former professional basketball player, who played in the NBA for the Sacramento Kings, Golden State Warriors and the Toronto Raptors
- Ryan Thompson (born 1988), professional basketball player and younger brother of Jason
- Kenie Wright (born 1997), soccer player who plays as a midfielder for Sky Blue FC in the NWSL

== Other schools in the district ==
Other schools in the district (with 2023–24 enrollment data from the National Center for Education Statistics) are:

- Cherokee High School - located in Evesham Township, with 2,108 students from Evesham Township
- Seneca High School - located in Tabernacle Township, with 1,018 students from Shamong, Southampton, Tabernacle and Woodland Townships
- Shawnee High School - located in Medford Township, with 1,418 students from Medford Lakes and Medford Township
