= Christina Foggie =

American professional basketball player

Personal information
- Born: March 5, 1992 (age 34) Voorhees Township, New Jersey, U.S.
- Listed height: 5 ft 9 in (1.75 m)

Career information
- High school: Lenape (Medford, New Jersey)
- College: Vanderbilt (2010–2014)
- WNBA draft: 2014: 2nd round, 24th overall pick
- Drafted by: Minnesota Lynx
- Position: Guard

Career highlights
- 2× First-team All-SEC (2012, 2014)
- Stats at WNBA.com
- Stats at Basketball Reference

Christina Foggie (born March 5, 1992, in Voorhees Township, New Jersey) is an American professional basketball player, who was drafted in 2014 by the Minnesota Lynx of the WNBA.

Foggie grew up in Mount Laurel, New Jersey and attended Lenape High School, where her 2,137 career points scored of any basketball player in school history, male or female.

== Vanderbilt statistics ==
Legend
| GP | Games played | GS | Games started | MPG | Minutes per game |
| FG% | Field goal percentage | 3P% | 3-point field goal percentage | FT% | Free throw percentage |
| RPG | Rebounds per game | APG | Assists per game | SPG | Steals per game |
| BPG | Blocks per game | PPG | Points per game | **Bold** | Career high |

| Year | Team | GP | Points | FG% | 3P% | FT% | RPG | APG | SPG | BPG | PPG |
|---|---|---|---|---|---|---|---|---|---|---|---|
| 2010–11 | Vanderbilt | 21 | 207 | 31.9 | 35.0 | 75.8 | 2.5 | 2.0 | 1.2 | 0.2 | 9.9 |
| 2011–12 | Vanderbilt | **33** | 585 | 45.0 | **41.6** | **83.2** | 3.4 | 2.1 | 1.3 | 0.2 | 17.7 |
| 2012–13 | Vanderbilt | 27 | 362 | 39.0 | 32.8 | 69.3 | 3.4 | 2.4 | **1.6** | 0.1 | 13.4 |
| 2013–14 | Vanderbilt | 31 | **589** | **45.6** | 39.0 | 72.1 | **3.6** | **3.2** | 1.4 | 0.2 | **19.0** |
| Career | | 112 | 1743 | 42.0 | 37.6 | 75.2 | 3.3 | 2.5 | 1.4 | 0.2 | 15.6 |
