= Cassie Harberts =

American basketball player

Personal information
- Born: June 4, 1992 (age 34) Laguna Hills, California, U.S.
- Listed height: 6 ft 2 in (1.88 m)
- Listed weight: 180 lb (82 kg)

Career information
- High school: San Clemente (San Clemente, California)
- College: USC (2010–2014)
- WNBA draft: 2014: 2nd round, 20th overall pick
- Drafted by: Atlanta Dream
- Playing career: 2014–present
- Position: Forward

Career history
- 2014–2015: West Coast Waves

Career highlights
- 2× All Pac-12 (2013, 2014); Pac-10 All-Freshman Team (2011)
- Stats at Basketball Reference
Medals
Women's basketball
Representing United States
World University Games
Gold medal – first place	2013 Kazan	Team
FIBA Under-18 Americas Championship
Gold medal – first place	2010 United States	Team

Cassandra Danielle Harberts (born June 4, 1992) is an American former college and professional basketball player who was drafted by the Atlanta Dream of the WNBA and played a year in the Australian WNBL.

== College ==
Harberts was coached by Michael Cooper her first three seasons at University of Southern California (USC) and by Cynthia Cooper-Dyke for her senior year. When she left USC, she was the teams number 7 all-time leader in points scored, number 8 all-time rebounder, and number 3 all-time in free throws made.

== USC statistics ==
Legend
GP	Games played	GS	Games started	MPG	Minutes per game
FG%	Field goal percentage	3P%	3-point field goal percentage	FT%	Free throw percentage
RPG	Rebounds per game	APG	Assists per game	SPG	Steals per game
BPG	Blocks per game	PPG	Points per game	**Bold**	Career high

Year	Team	GP	Points	FG%	3P%	FT%	RPG	APG	SPG	BPG	PPG
2010–11	USC	**37**	377	42.8	15.4	67.8	6.2	1.1	0.3	0.3	10.2
2011–12	USC	30	357	39.0	–	66.9	6.2	1.7	0.7	0.9	11.9
2012–13	USC	31	**559**	43.8	**32.0**	**69.5**	**8.2**	1.5	**1.1**	**1.1**	**18.0**
2013–14	USC	35	539	45.3	–	56.1	7.3	**1.8**	1.0	0.8	15.4
Career	USC	133	1832	43.0	23.8	65.0	7.0	1.5	0.8	0.7	13.8

== Post College Basketball ==
Harberts was drafted 20th in the 2014 WNBA draft by the Atlanta Dream (coached by her former college coach Michael Cooper) but failed to make the team. She played in the 2014–2015 WNBL season for the West Coast Waves.

== Personal life ==
Harberts has two brothers, Steven and Daniel, and has parents named Craig and Dorothy.

== See also ==
- USC Trojans women's basketball
