= 2027 WNBA draft =

Basketball player selection

2027 WNBA Draft

General information
- Sport: Basketball
- Date: April 12, 2027
- Network: ESPN

Overview
- 45 total selections in 3 rounds
- League: Women's National Basketball Association
- Teams: 15
- First selection: (Toronto Tempo)

The Women's National Basketball Association (WNBA)'s draft for the 2027 season will be held following the 2026–27 NCAA Division I women's basketball season.

== Draft lottery ==
On October 28, 2026, the WNBA announced that the 2027 draft lottery would be broadcast on Sunday, November 15, on ESPN.

=== Lottery chances ===
The lottery chances were based on the combined record from the 2024 and 2025 WNBA seasons. In the drawing, 14 balls numbered 1 to 14 were placed in a lottery machine and mixed. Four balls were drawn to determine a four-digit combination. The team assigned that four-ball combination received the No. 1 pick. The four balls were then be placed back into the machine and the process was repeated to determine the second pick. Of the three teams not selected in the drawings, the team with the worst cumulative two-year record was selected third; the team with the next worst record selected fourth; and the remaining team, fifth.

A representative from the league's independent accounting firm, Ernst & Young, was in attendance to oversee the draft lottery process.

Note: The team selected for the No. 1 pick in the lottery is noted below in bold text.

Team	Combined 2025–26 record	Lottery chances	Result
Houston Comets	22–66	32.9%	2nd pick
**Toronto Tempo**	**11–33**	**32.9%**	**1st pick**
Washington Mystics (from Chicago Sky)	26–62	16.1%	3rd pick
Seattle Storm	31–57	9.3%	4th pick
Portland Fire	17–27	5.2%	5th pick
Los Angeles Sparks	37–51	2.4%	6th pick
Los Angeles Sparks (from Phoenix Mercury)	43–45	1.2%	7th pick

== Eligibility and entrants ==
Under the 2026 collective bargaining agreement (CBA) between the WNBA and its players' union, ratified before this draft and mostly unchanged from the previous CBA, draft eligibility for players (not defined as "international") requires the following to be true:

- The player's 22nd birthday falls during the calendar year of the draft. For the 2027 draft, the cutoff birth date is December 31, 2003.
- She has either:
  - completed her college eligibility;
  - received a bachelor's degree, or is scheduled to receive such in the three months following the draft; or
  - is at least four years removed from high school graduation.

=== Early eligibility ===
Players who are younger than the draft's cutoff age and are scheduled to receive their bachelor's degree within three months of the draft date will only be eligible if the calendar year of the draft is no earlier than the fourth year after their high school graduation.

Players with remaining college eligibility but who do meet the cutoff age criteria must notify WNBA headquarters of their intent to enter the draft no later than 10 days before the draft date, and must renounce any remaining college eligibility to do so. For the 2027 draft, the date fell on April 2. A separate notification timetable is provided for players involved in postseason tournaments (i.e. the NCAA Division I tournament); those players (normally) must declare for the draft within 24 hours of their final collegiate game.

=== International players ===
"International players" are defined as those for whom all of the following is true:

- Born and currently residing outside the U.S.
- Never "exercised intercollegiate basketball eligibility" in the U.S.
- The player's 20th birthday falls during the calendar year of the draft. For this draft, the international cutoff birth date is December 31, 2007.

== Draft ==
*	Denotes player who has been selected for at least one All-Star Game and All-WNBA Team
^{#}	Denotes player who never played in the WNBA regular season or playoffs
**Bold**	Denotes player who won Rookie of the Year

=== First round ===
Pick	Player	Nationality	Team	School / club team
1			Toronto Tempo	
2			Houston Comets	
3			Washington Mystics (from Chicago)	
4			Seattle Storm	
5			Portland Fire	
6			Los Angeles Sparks	
7			Los Angeles Sparks (from Phoenix)	
8			New York Liberty	
9			Dallas Wings	
10			Indiana Fever	
11			Chicago Sky (from Washington)	
12			Chicago Sky (from Atlanta)	
13			Dallas Wings (from Las Vegas)	
14			Golden State Valkyries	
15			Minnesota Lynx	

=== Second round ===
Pick	Player	Nationality	Team	School / club team
16			Los Angeles Sparks (from Seattle)	
17			Houston Comets	
18			Toronto Tempo	
19			Los Angeles Sparks	
20			Washington Mystics (from Chicago)	
21			Phoenix Mercury	
22			Portland Fire	
23			New York Liberty	
24			Dallas Wings	
25			Indiana Fever	
26			Washington Mystics	
27			Atlanta Dream	
28			Las Vegas Aces	
29			Golden State Valkyries	
30			Dallas Wings (from Minnesota)	

=== Third round ===
Pick	Player	Nationality	Team	School / club team
31			Seattle Storm	
32			Houston Comets	
33			Toronto Tempo	
34			Los Angeles Sparks	
35			Chicago Sky	
36			Phoenix Mercury	
37			Portland Fire	
38			New York Liberty	
39			Seattle Storm (from Dallas)	
40			Indiana Fever	
41			Washington Mystics	
42			Atlanta Dream	
43			Las Vegas Aces	
44			Golden State Valkyries	
45			Minnesota Lynx	

== Sponsorship ==
State Street Investment Management, promoting the SPDR S&P 500 ETF Trust (known by its ticker symbol "SPY"), was the presenting sponsor of the event, replacing previous presenting sponsor State Farm. State Street began a multi-year sponsorship of the league in September 2025.
