= 2014 WNBA draft =

Player selection process

General information
- Sport: Basketball
- Date: April 14, 2014
- Location: Mohegan Sun Arena, Uncasville, Connecticut
- Networks: ESPN2, ESPNU

Overview
- League: WNBA
- First selection: Chiney Ogwumike; Connecticut Sun

The 2014 WNBA draft is the league's annual process for determining which teams receive the rights to negotiate with players entering the league. The draft was held on April 14, 2014, at Mohegan Sun Arena in Uncasville, Connecticut at 8:00 pm EDT. The first round was shown on ESPN2 (HD), with the second and third rounds shown on ESPNU.

== Draft lottery ==
The lottery selection to determine the order of the top four picks in the 2013 draft occurred on December 10, 2013. The draft lottery was televised (during SportsCenter at 6:30 pm ET).

Below were the chances for each team to get specific picks in the 2014 draft lottery, rounded to three decimal places:

Team	2013 record	Lottery chances	Pick			
Team	2013 record	Lottery chances	1st	2nd	3rd	4th
Connecticut Sun	10–24	442	.442	.316	.181	.062
Tulsa Shock	11–23	227	.276	.270	.293	.209
New York Liberty	11–23	227	.276	.269	.294	.209
San Antonio Stars	12–22	104	.104	.145	.232	.520
Shaded block denotes actual lottery result.

== Transactions ==
- March 1, 2013: The Minnesota Lynx acquired the 2nd round pick of the Tulsa Shock in a trade that sent Candice Wiggins to Tulsa.
- March 11, 2014: The Indiana Fever acquired a first round pick from the Phoenix Mercury as part of the Erin Phillips/Lynetta Kizer transaction.
- March 31, 2014: The Connecticut Sun acquired a first round pick from the Los Angeles Sparks in exchange for Sandrine Gruda.
- April 14, 2014: The Connecticut Sun acquired Alyssa Thomas (the New York Liberty's pick in the first round), Kelsey Bone, and the Liberty's 2015 1st round draft pick, in exchange for Tina Charles
- April 14, 2014: The Washington Mystics acquired Bria Hartley (the Seattle Storm's first round pick) and Tianna Hawkins for Crystal Langhorne

== Draft invitess ==
On April 10, 2014, the WNBA announced the 12 players who had been invited to attend the draft.

- (Canada) Natalie Achonwa, Notre Dame
- (United States) Stefanie Dolson, Connecticut
- (United States) Markeisha Gatling, NC State
- (United States) Chelsea Gray, Duke
- (United States) Bria Hartley, Connecticut
- (United States) Natasha Howard, Florida State
- (United States) Kayla McBride, Notre Dame
- (United States) Chiney Ogwumike, Stanford
- (United States) Shoni Schimmel, Louisville
- (United States) Meighan Simmons, Tennessee
- (United States) Odyssey Sims, Baylor
- (United States) Alyssa Thomas, Maryland

== Key ==
!	Denotes player who has been inducted to the Naismith Basketball Hall of Fame
^	Denotes player who has been inducted to the Women's Basketball Hall of Fame
*	Denotes player who has been selected for at least one All-Star Game and All-WNBA Team
^{+}	Denotes player who has been selected for at least one All-Star Game
^{#}	Denotes player who never played in the WNBA regular season or playoffs
**Bold**	Denotes player who won Rookie of the Year

== Draft ==
=== Round 1 ===
Pick	Player	Nationality	Team	School / club team
1	**Chiney Ogwumike** ^{+}	United States	Connecticut Sun	Stanford
2	Odyssey Sims *	United States	Tulsa Shock	Baylor
3	Kayla McBride ^{+}	United States	San Antonio Stars	Notre Dame
4	Alyssa Thomas * (traded to Connecticut)	United States	New York Liberty	Maryland
5	Natasha Howard *	United States	Indiana Fever	Florida State
6	Stefanie Dolson ^{+}	United States	Washington Mystics	Connecticut
7	Bria Hartley (traded to Washington)	United States	Seattle Storm	Connecticut
8	Shoni Schimmel ^{+}	United States	Atlanta Dream	Louisville
9	Natalie Achonwa	Canada	Indiana Fever (from Phoenix) (Note: March 11, 2014: Indiana to Phoenix: Indiana acquired Lynetta Kizer and 2014 first-round draft pick; Phoenix acquired Erin Phillips)	Notre Dame
10	Markeisha Gatling	United States	Chicago Sky	NC State
11	Chelsea Gray *	United States	Connecticut Sun (from Los Angeles)	Duke
12	Tricia Liston	United States	Minnesota Lynx	Duke

=== Round 2 ===
Pick	Player	Nationality	Team	School / club team
13	Jordan Hooper	United States	Tulsa Shock (from Connecticut)	Nebraska
14	Tyaunna Marshall ^{#}	United States	New York Liberty	Georgia Tech
15	Asya Bussie ^{#}	United States	Minnesota Lynx (from Tulsa)	West Virginia
16	Astou Ndour	Spain	San Antonio Stars	Gran Canarias (Spain)
17	Tiffany Bias	United States	Phoenix Mercury (from Indiana)	Oklahoma State
18	Inga Orekhova	Ukraine	Atlanta Dream (from Washington)	South Florida
19	Michelle Plouffe ^{#}	Canada	Seattle Storm	Utah
20	Cassie Harberts ^{#}	United States	Atlanta Dream	USC
21	Maggie Lucas	United States	Phoenix Mercury	Penn State
22	Gennifer Brandon	United States	Chicago Sky	California
23	Jennifer Hamson	United States	Los Angeles Sparks	BYU
24	Christina Foggie ^{#}	United States	Minnesota Lynx	Vanderbilt

=== Round 3 ===
Pick	Player	Nationality	Team	School / club team
25	DeNesha Stallworth ^{#}	United States	Connecticut Sun	Kentucky
26	Meighan Simmons	United States	New York Liberty	Tennessee
27	Theresa Plaisance	United States	Tulsa Shock	LSU
28	Bri Kulas ^{#}	United States	San Antonio Stars	Missouri
29	Haiden Palmer ^{#}	United States	Indiana Fever	Gonzaga
30	Carley Mijović ^{#}	Australia	Washington Mystics	Canberra Capitals (Australia)
31	Mikaela Ruef ^{#}	United States	Seattle Storm	Stanford
32	Kody Burke ^{#}	United States	Washington Mystics (from Atlanta)	NC State
33	Stephanie Talbot	Australia	Phoenix Mercury	Adelaide Lightning (Australia)
34	Jamierra Faulkner	United States	Chicago Sky	Southern Miss
35	Antonita Slaughter ^{#}	United States	Los Angeles Sparks	Louisville
36	Asia Taylor	United States	Minnesota Lynx	Louisville

== See also ==
- List of first overall WNBA draft picks
