= WNBA draft =

Annual draft held by the WNBA

The WNBA draft is an annual draft held by the WNBA through which WNBA teams can select new players from a talent pool of college and professional women's basketball players. The first WNBA draft was held in 1997.

== Eligibility ==
The WNBA "requires players to be at least 22, to have completed their college eligibility, to have graduated from a four-year college or to be four years removed from high school". Since the WNBA draft is currently held in April, before most U.S. colleges and universities have ended their academic years, the league considers anyone scheduled to graduate in the 3 months after the draft to be a "graduate" for draft purposes. The current rules for draft eligibility have been in place since at least 2014.

The specifics of this rule differ in several ways from those used by the NBA for its draft.

- Both drafts make a distinction between U.S. and "international" players. However, the definition of "international player" differs slightly between the two drafts. The NBA defines an "international player" as an individual who has permanently resided outside the U.S. for the three years preceding the draft while playing basketball (amateur or professional), did not complete high school education in the U.S., and has never enrolled in a U.S. college or university. A prospective NBA player's birthplace or citizenship is not relevant to his status as an "international player". On the other hand, the WNBA defines an "international player" as "any person born and residing outside the United States who participates in the game of basketball as an amateur or professional" (emphasis added), and who has never "exercised intercollegiate basketball eligibility" in the U.S. This means that a prospective WNBA player who was born in the United States is treated as a U.S. player, regardless of where she was educated or trained in basketball. Likewise, the association also defines as an "international player" a prospect with non-U.S. nationality even if one of her parents is a natural-born American, unless she has enrolled in a U.S. postsecondary institution.
- The current age limit for NBA draft eligibility is 19, measured on December 31 of the calendar year of the draft. The WNBA's age limit is 20 for "international players" and 22 for U.S. players, both also being measured as of December 31 of the calendar year of the draft.
- A WNBA prospect who graduates from college while under the age limit can be eligible, but only if the calendar year of her college graduation is no earlier than the fourth after her high school graduation.
- In both drafts, players subject to the rules for U.S. players can declare early eligibility; however, the WNBA's higher age limit means that very few such players have the option to make such a declaration.
- For those players who are eligible to declare early, the timing of the declaration process is dramatically different.
  - NBA prospects must notify the league office of their intent to enter the draft no later than 60 days prior to the draft, which is currently held in June. Current rules allow prospects to withdraw from the draft and retain college eligibility, as long as they comply with NCAA rules regarding relationships with agents, do not sign a professional contract, and notify the league office of their withdrawal no later than 10 days after the end of the NBA Draft Combine.
  - WNBA prospects must notify the league office no later than 10 days before the draft, and must renounce any remaining college eligibility to enter the draft. However, because postseason national tournaments (most notably the NCAA Division I tournament) are still ongoing during the 10 days prior to the draft, certain players who would otherwise be eligible to declare cannot do so before the standard deadline. A prospect whose team is still playing during the 10-day window must make her declaration within the 24 hours following her team's final game of the season, but no less than 3 hours before the scheduled start of the draft. The 3-hour period is a historic artifact that stems from the former scheduling of the WNBA draft; from 2006 to 2008, it was held in the city of the women's Final Four on the day after the championship game. Despite media commentary that argued that players involved in the NCAA tournament needed more time to make draft decisions, the most recent WNBA CBA, agreed to in 2020, did not change any draft eligibility rules.

For the 2021 draft only, the league and its players union, the Women's National Basketball Players Association, agreed to modified eligibility rules due to changes brought on by COVID-19. The most significant change is that all age-eligible college players who wished to enter that draft had to opt in. Because the NCAA ruled that the 2020–21 season would not count against the eligibility of any basketball player, everyone who played in that season, regardless of class, had remaining athletic eligibility at the time of the draft. Players who wished to enter the 2021 draft had to renounce college eligibility and notify the WNBA offices by email no later than April 1 of that year. Players involved in the 2021 Final Four had 48 hours after the completion of their final game, instead of the normal 24, to notify the league of their intent to enter the draft.

== Structure ==
The 1997 WNBA draft was divided into three parts. The first part was the initial allocation of 16 players into individual teams. Players such as Cynthia Cooper and Michelle Timms were assigned to different teams. The second part was the WNBA Elite draft, which was composed of professional women's basketball players who had competed in other leagues. The last part would be the 4 rounds of the regular draft.

The next three seasons to follow 1998, 1999 and 2000 would all have expansion drafts. There would not be another expansion draft until the 2006 season.

All seasons before 2002 had 4 rounds. Since 2003, all drafts are 3 rounds.

In 2003 and 2004, there were dispersal drafts due to the folding of the Cleveland Rockers, Miami Sol and Portland Fire. The players from Rockers, Sol and Fire were reallocated to existing teams. There were also dispersal drafts in 2007 with the folding of the Charlotte Sting, 2009 with the shuttering of the Houston Comets, and in 2010 when the Maloofs cast off the Sacramento Monarchs to focus their resources on the Kings franchise in the NBA.

== Players selected ==
There are no restrictions on what part of the world the players come from (though under varying rules, international players have been subject to tighter age restrictions within the draft than college players). However, college sports governing bodies, most notably the NCAA, prohibit players from competing in professional leagues simultaneously with their college eligibility. Once the player has joined the WNBA, she is eligible to participate in overseas leagues during the WNBA offseason (many WNBA players play in Europe, Australia, or more recently China).

=== First picks ===
Dena Head is the oldest No. 1 draft pick (she was 27 years old), having graduated from the University of Tennessee in 1992 and the first player ever drafted to the WNBA. Lauren Jackson is the youngest No. 1 draft pick, being drafted at the age of 19. As of 2022, of the 25 championship teams in WNBA history, seventeen of them have had at least one No. 1 overall pick on its roster - from Tina Thompson with the Houston Comets in 1997 to Candace Parker with the Chicago Sky in 2021.

| Year | Player | Country | College/club | Drafted by |
|---|---|---|---|---|
| 1997 Elite | Dena Head | United States | Tennessee | Utah Starzz (Note: This franchise now competes as the Las Vegas Aces.) |
| 1997 | Tina Thompson | United States | USC | Houston Comets |
| 1998 | Margo Dydek | Poland | Pool Getafe (Spain) | Utah Starzz |
| 1999 | Chamique Holdsclaw (Note: Named WNBA Rookie of the Year.) (Note: Started in the WNBA All-Star Game in her rookie season.) | United States | Tennessee | Washington Mystics |
| 2000 | Ann Wauters | Belgium | Valenciennes (France) | Cleveland Rockers |
| 2001 | Lauren Jackson (Note: Named as an All-Star Game reserve in her rookie season.) | Australia | Canberra Capitals (Australia) | Seattle Storm |
| 2002 | Sue Bird | United States | UConn (Note: At the time of this draft, the University of Connecticut used "Connecticut" as its primary athletic brand, with "UConn" as a frequently used short form. "UConn" became the sole athletic brand in the 2013–14 school year.) | Seattle Storm |
| 2003 | LaToya Thomas | United States | Mississippi State | Cleveland Rockers |
| 2004 | Diana Taurasi | United States | UConn | Phoenix Mercury |
| 2005 | Janel McCarville | United States | Minnesota | Charlotte Sting |
| 2006 | Seimone Augustus | United States | LSU | Minnesota Lynx |
| 2007 | Lindsey Harding | United States | Duke | Phoenix Mercury (traded to Minn.) |
| 2008 | Candace Parker (Note: Named WNBA MVP in her rookie season.) | United States | Tennessee | Los Angeles Sparks |
| 2009 | Angel McCoughtry | United States | Louisville | Atlanta Dream |
| 2010 | Tina Charles | United States | UConn | Connecticut Sun |
| 2011 | Maya Moore | United States | UConn | Minnesota Lynx |
| 2012 | Nneka Ogwumike | United States | Stanford | Los Angeles Sparks |
| 2013 | Brittney Griner | United States | Baylor | Phoenix Mercury |
| 2014 | Chiney Ogwumike | United States | Stanford | Connecticut Sun |
| 2015 | Jewell Loyd | United States | Notre Dame | Seattle Storm |
| 2016 | Breanna Stewart | United States | UConn | Seattle Storm |
| 2017 | Kelsey Plum | United States | Washington | San Antonio Stars |
| 2018 | A'ja Wilson | United States | South Carolina | Las Vegas Aces |
| 2019 | Jackie Young | United States | Notre Dame | Las Vegas Aces |
| 2020 | Sabrina Ionescu | United States | Oregon | New York Liberty |
| 2021 | Charli Collier | United States | Texas | New York Liberty (traded to Dallas via Seattle) |
| 2022 | Rhyne Howard | United States | Kentucky | Atlanta Dream |
| 2023 | Aliyah Boston | United States (Note: Born on the United States Virgin Islands, a U.S. territory.) | South Carolina | Indiana Fever |
| 2024 | Caitlin Clark | United States | Iowa | Indiana Fever |
| 2025 | Paige Bueckers | United States | UConn | Dallas Wings |
| 2026 | Azzi Fudd | United States | UConn | Dallas Wings |
| 2027 | | | | |

Notes

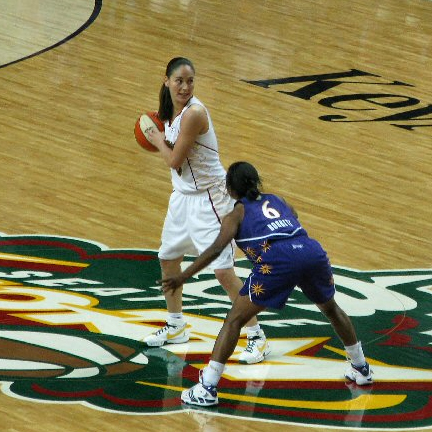
Sue Bird, on offense

== See also ==
- WNBA Rookie of the Year Award
