= Women's National Basketball Association =

Professional league in North America

- Upcoming season or competition: 2027 WNBA season
- Founded: April 24, 1996; 30 years ago
- First season: 1997
- Commissioner: Cathy Engelbert
- No. of teams: 15 (18 by 2030)
- Countries: United States (14 teams); Canada (1 team)
- Headquarters: New York City, United States
- Most recent champions: Golden State Valkyries (1st title) (2026 Golden State Valkyries season)
- Most titles: Houston Comets; Minnesota Lynx; Seattle Storm (4 titles each)
- Broadcasters: United States: ABC/ESPN/ESPN2; NBC/NBCSN/Peacock; USA Network/CNBC; Amazon Prime Video; NBA TV; CBS/Paramount+; Ion; Canada: TSN/CTV; Amazon Prime Video; NBA TV Canada; International: see list
- Website: wnba.com

The Women's National Basketball Association (WNBA) is a women's professional basketball league in North America composed of 15 teams (14 in the United States and 1 in Canada), scheduled to expand to 18 by 2030. The WNBA is one of the professional women's sports leagues in North America. The league is headquartered in New York City.

The WNBA was founded on April 24, 1996, as the women's counterpart to the National Basketball Association (NBA); league play began in 1997. The regular season runs from May to September, with each team playing 44 games. The top eight teams (regardless of conference) qualify for the playoffs, culminating in the WNBA Finals, which is played in November.

The All-Star Game occurs in late-July. The league hosts an annual mid-season competition, the Commissioner's Cup. The WNBA is an active member of USA Basketball (USAB), which is recognized by the International Basketball Federation (FIBA) as the governing body for basketball in the U.S.

== History ==
=== League founded and play begins (1996–1997) ===
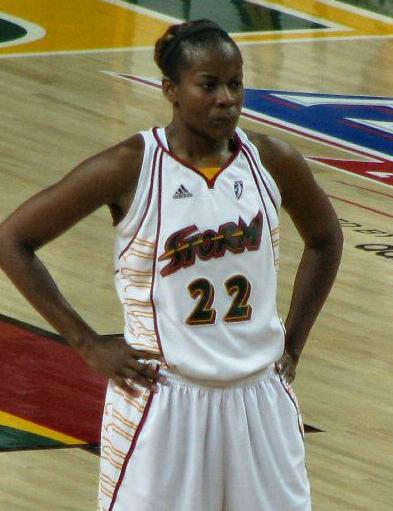
Sheryl Swoopes, the first player signed by the WNBA, won four championships with the Houston Comets and three MVP awards.

The creation of the WNBA was officially approved by the NBA Board of Governors on April 24, 1996, and announced at a press conference with players Rebecca Lobo, Lisa Leslie, and Sheryl Swoopes in attendance. The new WNBA had to compete with the recently formed American Basketball League (ABL), another professional women's league that began play in the fall of 1996, but ceased operation during its 1998–99 season.

The WNBA began with eight teams: the Charlotte Sting, Cleveland Rockers, Houston Comets, and New York Liberty in the Eastern Conference; and the Los Angeles Sparks, Phoenix Mercury, Sacramento Monarchs, and Utah Starzz in the Western Conference.

While the first major women's professional basketball league in the U.S. was the defunct WBL, the WNBA is the only league to receive full backing of the NBA. The WNBA logo, "Logo Woman", paralleled the NBA logo and was selected out of 50 different designs.

After a much-publicized gold medal run by the USA women's national team at the 1996 Summer Olympic Games, the WNBA began its first season on June 21, 1997. The first WNBA game featured the New York Liberty facing the Los Angeles Sparks in Los Angeles. The Liberty defeated the Sparks 67–57. A crowd of 14,284 attended the game at the Great Western Forum in Inglewood, California. The game was televised nationally in the U.S. on the NBC television network. At the start of the 1997 season, the WNBA had TV deals with NBC (NBA rights holder), ESPN, and Lifetime. Penny Toler scored the league's first point.

=== Houston domination and league expansion (1997–2000) ===
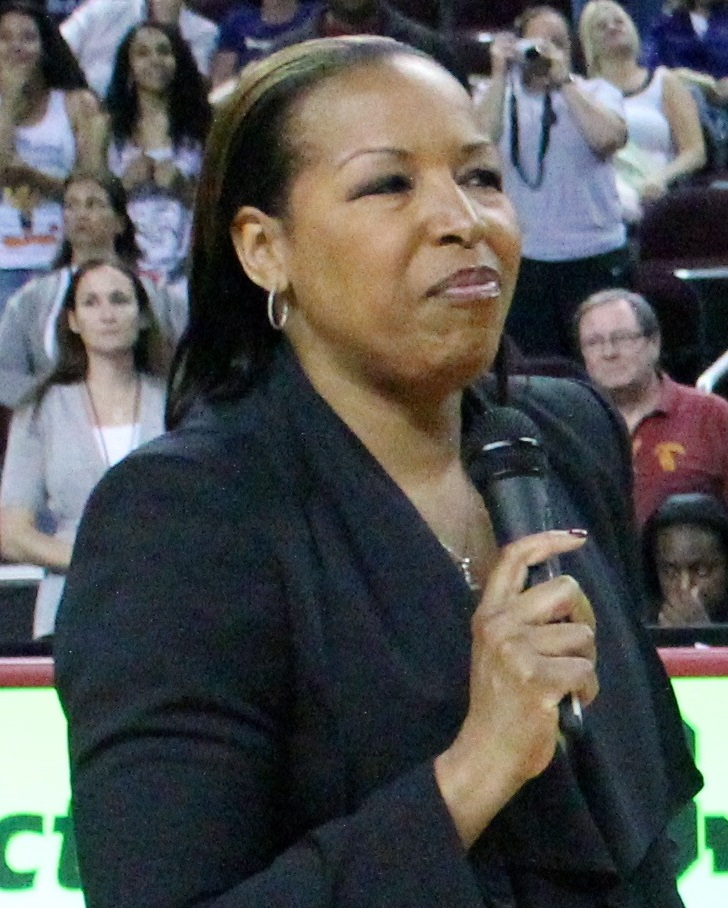
Cynthia Cooper entered the WNBA at age 34 and won Finals MVP in each of the Houston Comets' four championships.

The WNBA centered its marketing campaign, dubbed "We Got Next", around stars Rebecca Lobo, Lisa Leslie, and Sheryl Swoopes. In the league's first season, Leslie's Los Angeles Sparks underperformed, and Swoopes sat out much of the season due to her pregnancy. Perhaps the WNBA's first star was MVP Cynthia Cooper, Swoopes' teammate on the Houston Comets. The Comets defeated Lobo's New York Liberty in the first WNBA championship game. The initial "We Got Next" advertisement ran before each season until it was replaced with a "We Got Game" campaign.

Two teams were added in 1998 (the Detroit Shock and Washington Mystics), and two more in 1999 (the Orlando Miracle and Minnesota Lynx), bringing the total number of teams in the league to 12. The 1999 season began with a collective bargaining agreement between players and the league, marking the first collective bargaining agreement to be signed in the history of women's professional sports. That year, the WNBA also announced it would add four more teams for the 2000 season (the Indiana Fever, Seattle Storm, Miami Sol, and Portland Fire), bringing the league to 16 teams. WNBA president Val Ackerman discussed expansion, saying: "This won't be the end of it. We expect to keep growing the league."

In 1999, the league's chief competition, the American Basketball League (ABL), declared bankruptcy. Many of the ABL's star players, including several Olympic gold medalists (such as Nikki McCray and Dawn Staley) and a number of standout college performers (including Kate Starbird and Jennifer Rizzotti), joined the rosters of WNBA teams, enhancing the overall quality of play in the league.

On May 23, 2000, the Comets became the first women's professional team to be invited to the White House Rose Garden. At the end of the 2000 season, the Comets won their fourth championship, capturing every title since the league's inception. Led by the "Big Three" of Cooper (who won the Finals MVP for all four championships), Swoopes, and Tina Thompson, the Comets dominated every team in the league. Under head coach Van Chancellor, the team posted a 98–24 record their first four seasons (16–3 in the playoffs). After 2000, Cooper retired from the league, and the Comets' dynasty came to an end.

=== L.A. Sparks success; new league ownership and contraction (2001–2002) ===
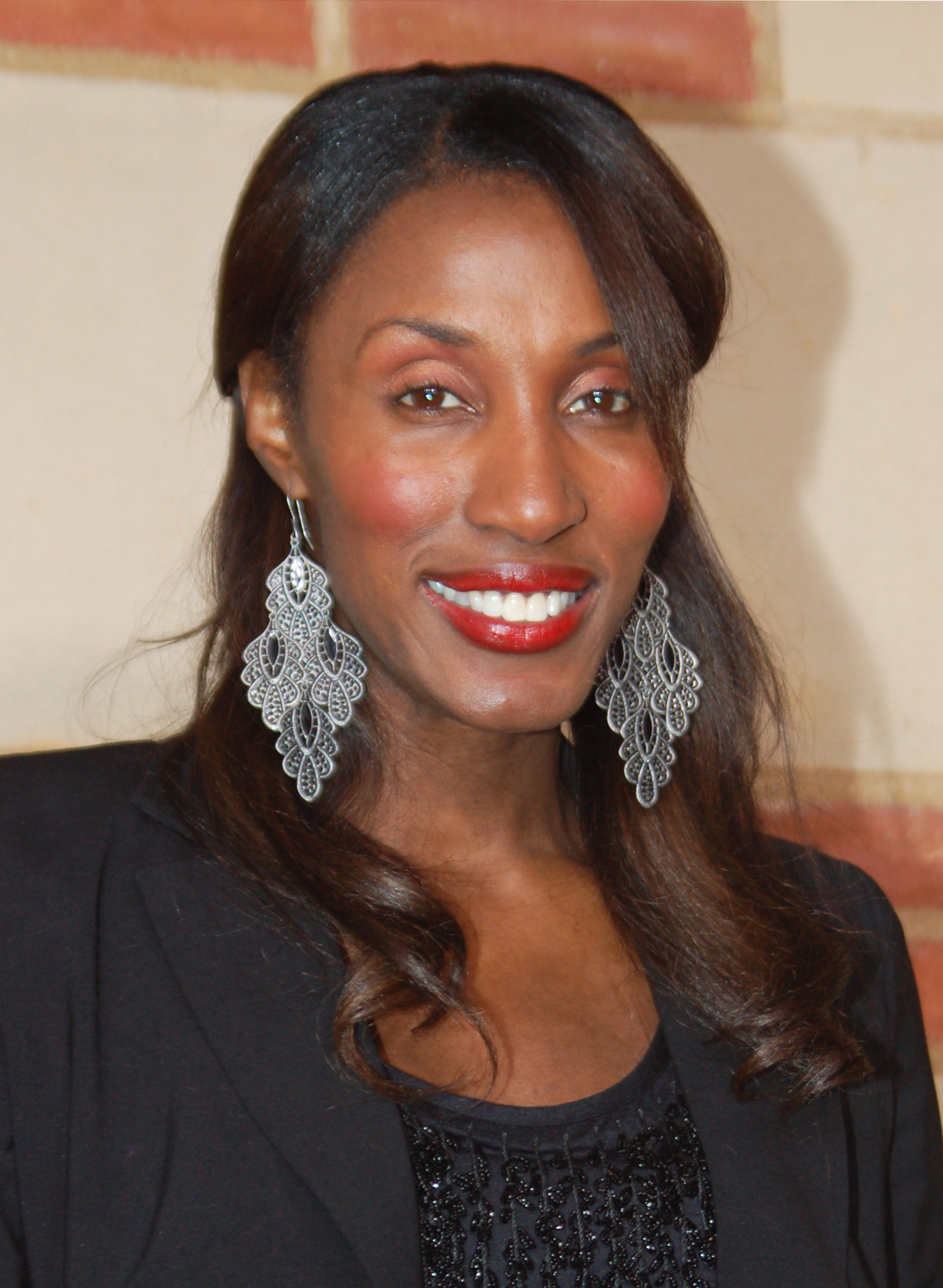
Lisa Leslie, a three-time MVP and the first player to dunk in a WNBA game

The Los Angeles Sparks had the best record during the 2001 WNBA season. Led by Lisa Leslie, the Sparks posted a regular-season record of 28–4 and advanced to their first WNBA Finals, sweeping the Charlotte Sting.

Looking for a repeat in 2002, the Sparks again made a strong run toward the postseason, going 25–7 in the regular season under head coach Michael Cooper. Again, Leslie dominated throughout the Playoffs, leading the Sparks to a perfect 6–0 record, beating the New York Liberty in the 2002 Finals.

Teams and the league were collectively owned by the NBA until the end of 2002, when the NBA sold WNBA teams either to their NBA counterparts in the same city or to a third party as a result of the dot-com bubble. This led to two teams moving: Utah moved to San Antonio, and Orlando moved to Connecticut and became the first WNBA team to be owned by a third party instead of an NBA franchise. This sale of teams also led to two teams folding, the Miami Sol and Portland Fire, because new owners could not be found.

=== Bill Laimbeer leaves his mark (2003–2006) ===
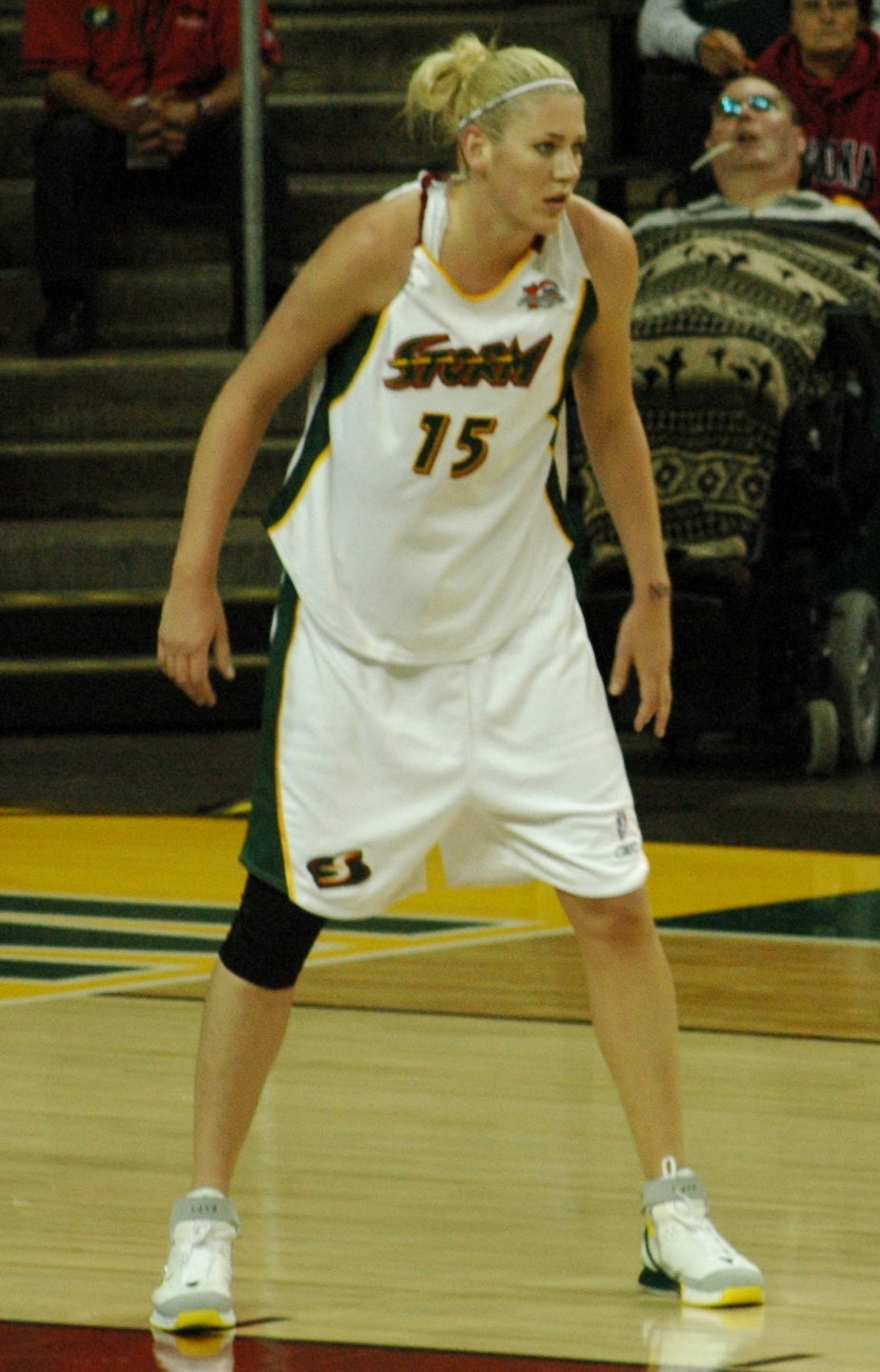
Lauren Jackson, a three-time MVP and the most accomplished international player in league history

The Women's National Basketball Players Association (WNBPA) threatened to strike in 2003 if a new deal was not reached between players and the league. The result was a delay in the start of the 2003 preseason and the 2003 WNBA draft, along with negative publicity for the league.

Bill Laimbeer took over the Detroit Shock in 2002 as head coach and general manager. He had high hopes for the Shock, despite the team having gone 9–23 its previous season. Three Shock members made it to the 2003 All-Star Game (Swin Cash, Cheryl Ford, and Deanna Nolan), and Laimbeer orchestrated a worst-to-first turnaround with the Shock finishing the season 25–9 and in first place in the Eastern Conference. In the 2003 Finals, the Shock defeated the Los Angeles Sparks 2–1, winning game three in front of a league-record crowd of 22,076.

After the 2003 season, the Cleveland Rockers, one of the league's original eight teams, folded because its owners were unwilling to continue operating the franchise.

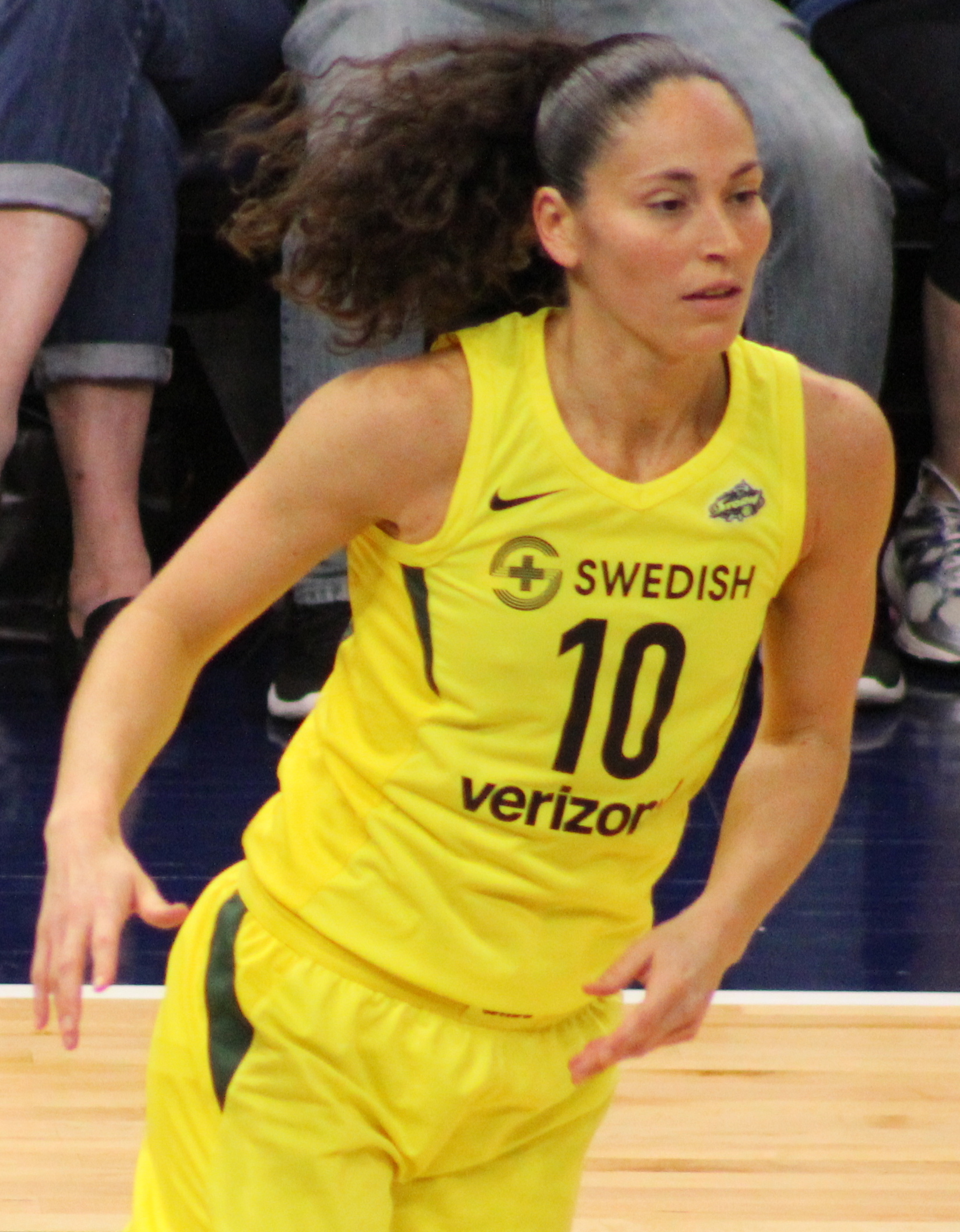
Sue Bird spent her entire WNBA career with the Seattle Storm and is the only player to win titles in three different decades.

The Seattle Storm had consecutive first-overall draft picks in 2001 and 2002, selecting Lauren Jackson and Sue Bird. The Storm's young core broke through in 2004, finishing second in the Western Conference and advancing to the Finals. In a battle of two first-time finalists, the Storm defeated the Connecticut Sun 2–1 and won their first WNBA title. Anne Donovan became the first female coach to guide a team to a WNBA championship.

Val Ackerman, the first WNBA president, resigned effective February 1, 2005, citing the desire to spend more time with her family. Ackerman later became president of USA Basketball. On February 15, 2005, NBA commissioner David Stern announced that Donna Orender, who had been serving as the senior vice president of the PGA Tour and played for several teams in the now-defunct Women's Pro Basketball League, would be Ackerman's successor as of April 2005.

The WNBA awarded an expansion team to Chicago (later named the Chicago Sky) in February 2005. In the off-season, a set of rule changes was approved that made the WNBA more like the NBA.

The 2005 Finals was the first played in a best-of-five format. In another matchup between two teams seeking their first championship, the Sun came up short for the second consecutive year, falling in four games to the Sacramento Monarchs led by Yolanda Griffith.

In 2006, the league reached a milestone as the first team-oriented women's professional sports league to exist for ten consecutive seasons. On its tenth anniversary, the WNBA released its All-Decade Team, comprising the ten WNBA players who had contributed, through on-court play and off-court activities, the most to women's basketball during the league's existence.

The Shock bounced back in 2006 behind newly acquired Katie Smith, along with six remaining members from their 2003 championship run. The Shock finished second in the Eastern Conference and knocked out first-seeded Connecticut in the second round of the Playoffs. In the Finals, they faced reigning champion Sacramento, winning in Game Five on their home floor.

=== Bringing "Paul Ball" to the WNBA (2007–2009) ===
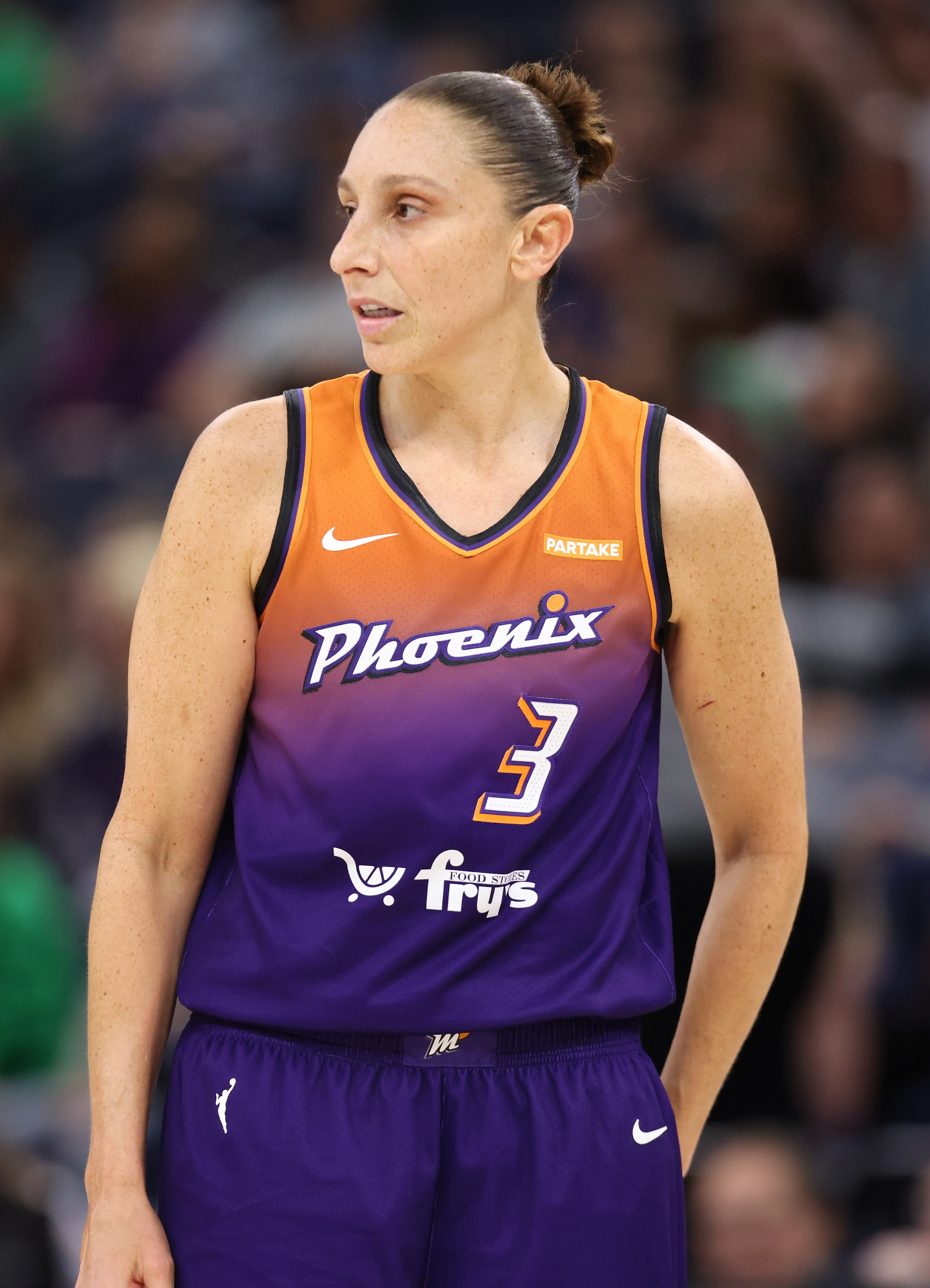
Diana Taurasi, the WNBA's all-time leading scorer, spent her entire 20-year WNBA career with the Phoenix Mercury.

In December 2006, the Charlotte Bobcats organization announced it would no longer operate the Charlotte Sting. Soon after, the WNBA announced the Sting would not operate for 2007. A dispersal draft was held on January 8, 2007. Teams selected in inverse order of their 2006 records with the Chicago Sky receiving the first pick.

The Phoenix Mercury hired coach Paul Westhead before the 2006 season. His up-tempo style of play was perfect for the team, especially after the league shortened the shot clock from 30 to 24 seconds in 2006. Led by their "Big Three" of Cappie Pondexter, Diana Taurasi, and Penny Taylor, the Mercury averaged a league-record 89.0 points per game in 2007, far surpassing the previous record, and were propelled into first place in the Western Conference. Facing reigning champions the Detroit Shock in the 2007 Finals, the Mercury beat Detroit on their home floor in front of 22,076 fans in Game Five to claim their first-ever WNBA title.

In October 2007, the WNBA awarded another expansion franchise to Atlanta. Atlanta businessman Ron Terwilliger was the original owner of the new team. Citizens of Atlanta voted on the new team's nickname and colors, selecting the name Atlanta Dream.

During the 2008 regular season, the first-ever outdoor professional basketball game in North America, the Liberty Outdoor Classic, was played at Arthur Ashe Stadium in New York City. The Indiana Fever defeated the New York Liberty 71–55 in front of over 19,000 fans. In the 2008 Finals, the Shock swept the first-time finalists, the San Antonio Silver Stars, winning their third championship in six years under coach Bill Laimbeer. The victory effectively marked the end of the Shock dynasty, as Laimbeer resigned early in the 2009 season, with the team relocating shortly thereafter.

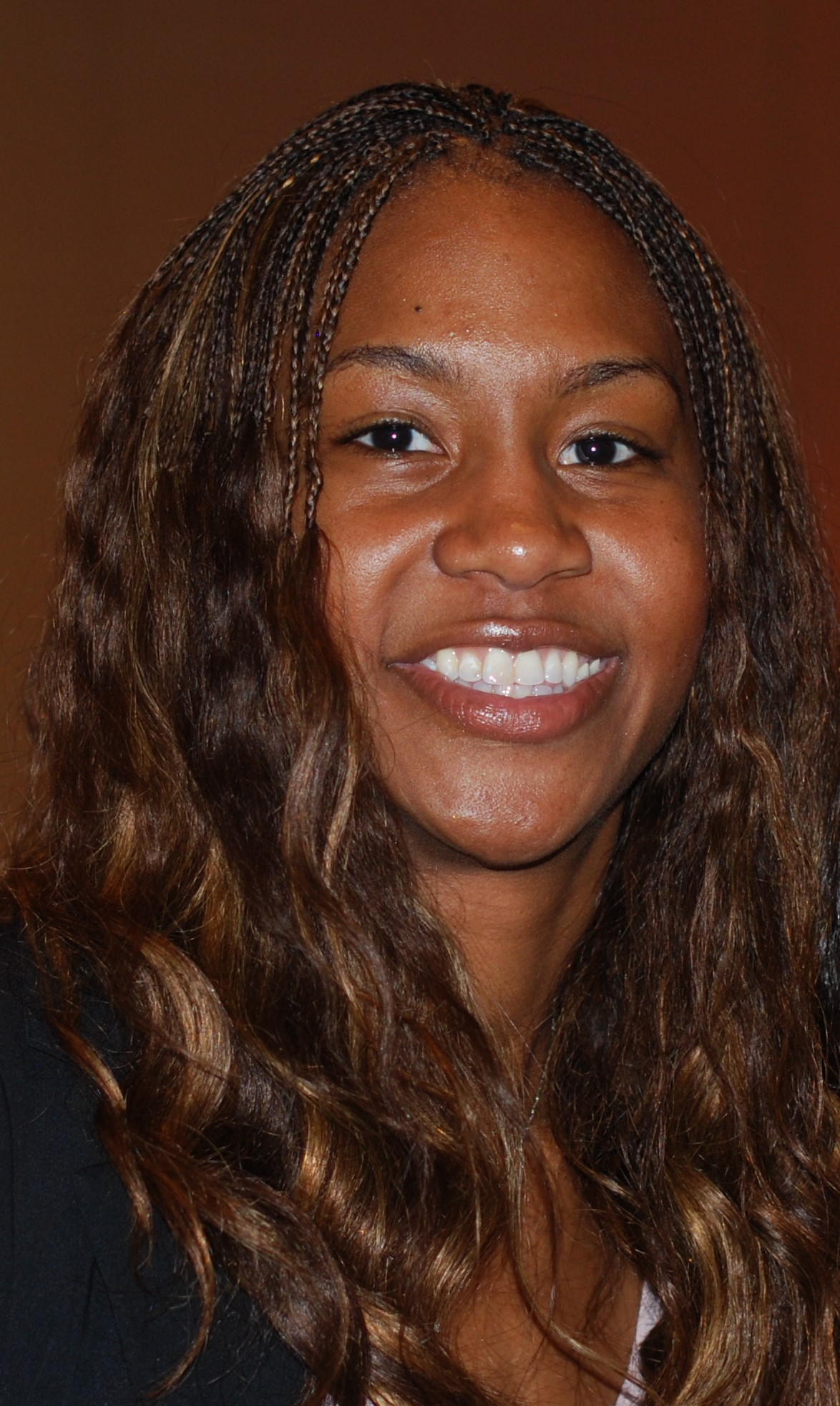
Tamika Catchings, a five-time Defensive Player of the Year, spent her entire WNBA career with the Indiana Fever.

Late in 2008, the WNBA took over ownership of one of the league's original franchises, the Houston Comets. The Comets ceased operations on December 1, 2008, after no owners could be found. A dispersal draft took place on December 8, 2008, with the first pick, Sancho Lyttle, taken by the Atlanta Dream.

Paul Westhead left the Mercury following the 2007 title, and the team faltered in 2008, becoming the first defending champion in league history to miss the playoffs. New head coach Corey Gaines implemented Westhead's style of play, and in 2009, the Mercury once again broke their own record, averaging 92.8 points per game in the regular season. Helped by the return of Taylor, who missed the 2008 season and a large part of the 2009 season, the Mercury clinched first place in the Western Conference and advanced to the 2009 Finals. The championship series was a battle of contrasting styles as the Mercury, number one league offense, faced the Indiana Fever, number three league defense. Phoenix won Game One in overtime, 120–116, the highest scoring game in WNBA playoffs history, and defeated the Fever in five games, capturing their second WNBA championship.

Westhead's system influenced his Mercury team, but it also created a domino effect throughout the league. Young athletic players were capable of scoring more and playing at a faster pace. As a league, the 2010 average of 80.35 points per game was its best, surpassing the 69.2 average in the league's inaugural season.

=== Changing of the guard (2010–2012) ===
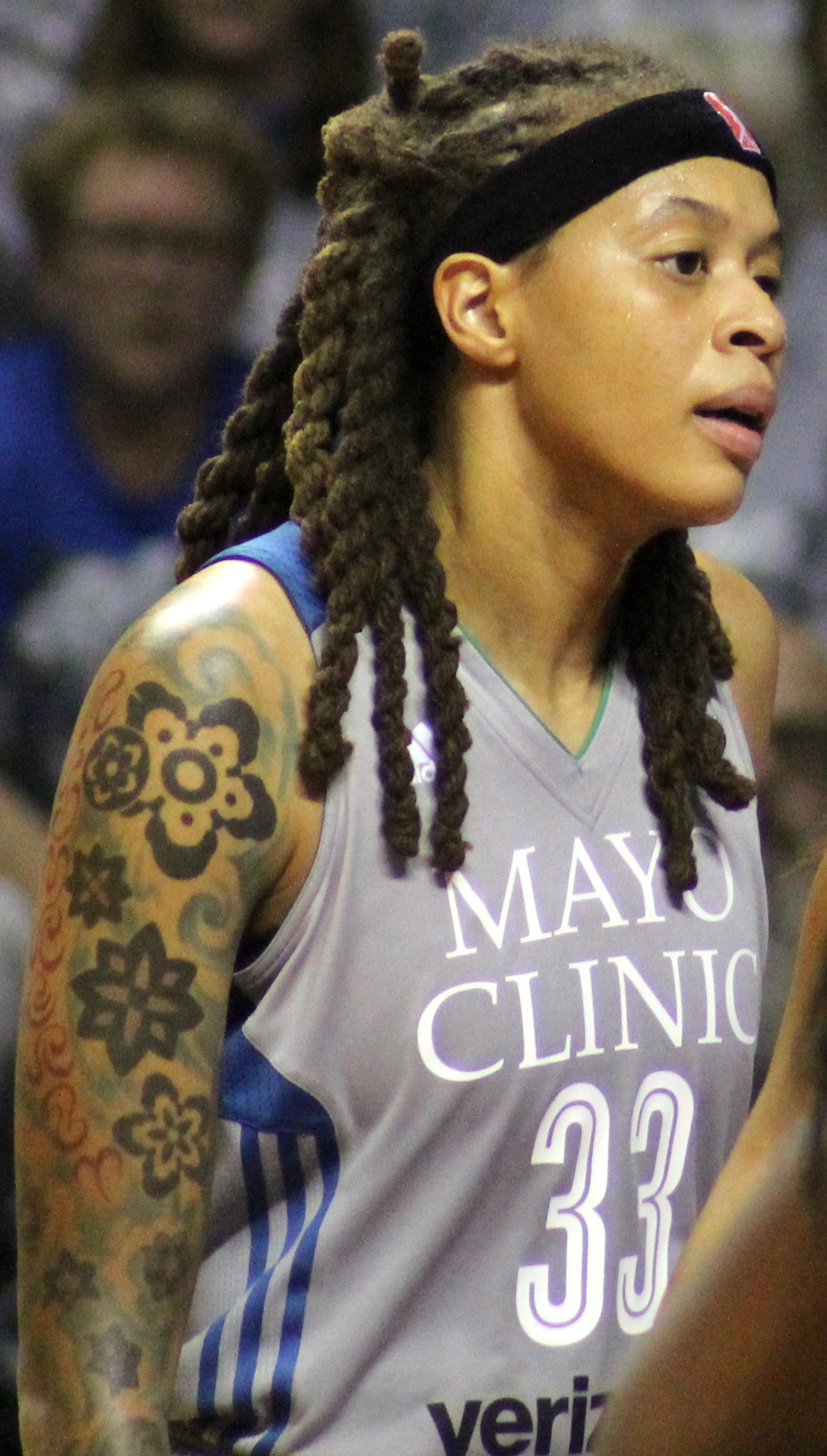
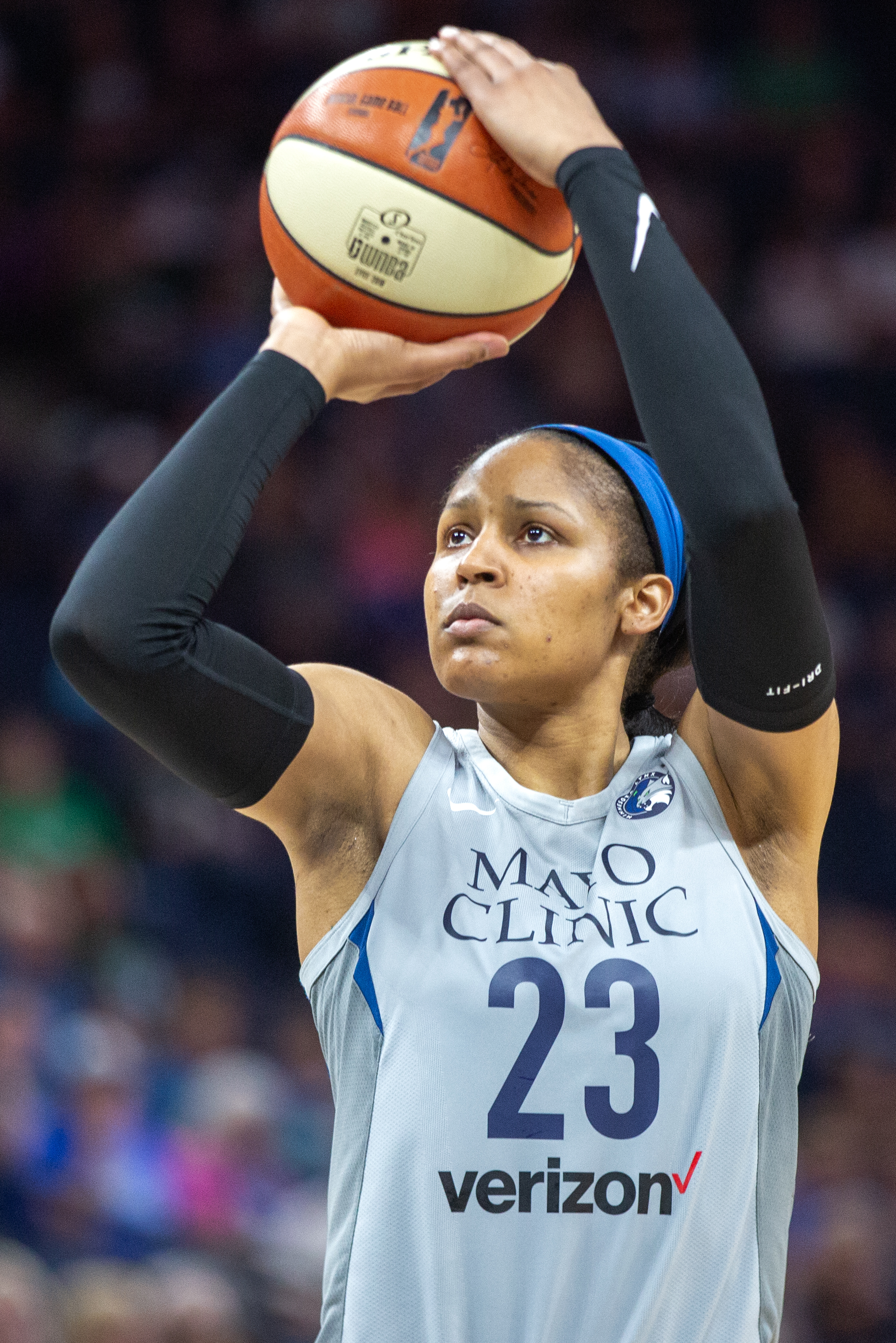
Seimone Augustus and Maya Moore, two cornerstones of the Minnesota Lynx dynasty that won four titles between 2011 and 2017.

On October 20, 2009, the WNBA announced the Detroit Shock would relocate to Tulsa, Oklahoma, to become the Tulsa Shock. On November 20, 2009, the WNBA announced the Sacramento Monarchs had folded due to lack of support from its current owners, the Maloof family, who also owned the Sacramento Kings at the time. The league announced it would seek new owners to relocate the team to the San Francisco Bay Area; however, no ownership was found and a dispersal draft was held on December 14, 2009. The folding of the Monarchs left the WNBA with 12 teams, a number that remained unchanged for the next fifteen seasons.

The 2010 season saw a tight race in the East, which held a .681 winning percentage over the West, its highest ever. However, it was a Western team, the Seattle Storm, who ultimately dominated the league. Led once again by the duo of Sue Bird and Lauren Jackson, the only players remaining from the 2004 championship team, the Storm finished 28–6 in the regular season and 7–0 in the playoffs. Although the Storm swept the Atlanta Dream, the 2010 Finals were a close affair, with Seattle winning the three games by a combined eight points. The Dream, who had finished their inaugural 2008 season 4–30, made a quick turnaround behind the 2009 first-overall pick Angel McCoughtry and advanced to the Finals in their third year.

After the 2010 season, President Donna Orender announced she would be resigning from her position as of December 31. On April 21, 2011, NBA commissioner David Stern announced that former Girl Scouts of the USA Senior Vice President and Chief Marketing Officer, Laurel J. Richie, would assume duties as president on May 16, 2011.

During their first 11 seasons in the league, the Minnesota Lynx saw little success, winning only one playoff game. Before the 2010 season, Cheryl Reeve took over as head coach, and the team added Rebekkah Brunson and Lindsay Whalen to support 2006 first-overall pick Seimone Augustus. The Lynx failed to make the playoffs again in Reeve's first season, but were able to select Maya Moore with the first pick in the 2011 draft. The core of Augustus, Brunson, Moore, and Whalen would go on to make six Finals appearances and win four championships over the next seven years. Their first title came immediately in 2011, with the Lynx dominating the regular season and dropping only one game throughout their playoff run. In the 2011 Finals, the Dream were swept for the second straight year despite efforts by McCoughtry, who set still-standing league records for most points in a playoff game (42) and in a Finals game (38) during the Dream's consecutive Finals appearances.

The Lynx made it back to the 2012 Finals but fell in four games to the Indiana Fever, led by Tamika Catchings. In a challenging run, the Fever had to stave off elimination in both of the first two rounds and lost their second-leading scorer, Katie Douglas, to injury before ultimately capturing their first WNBA championship.

=== The "Three to See" (2013–2019) ===
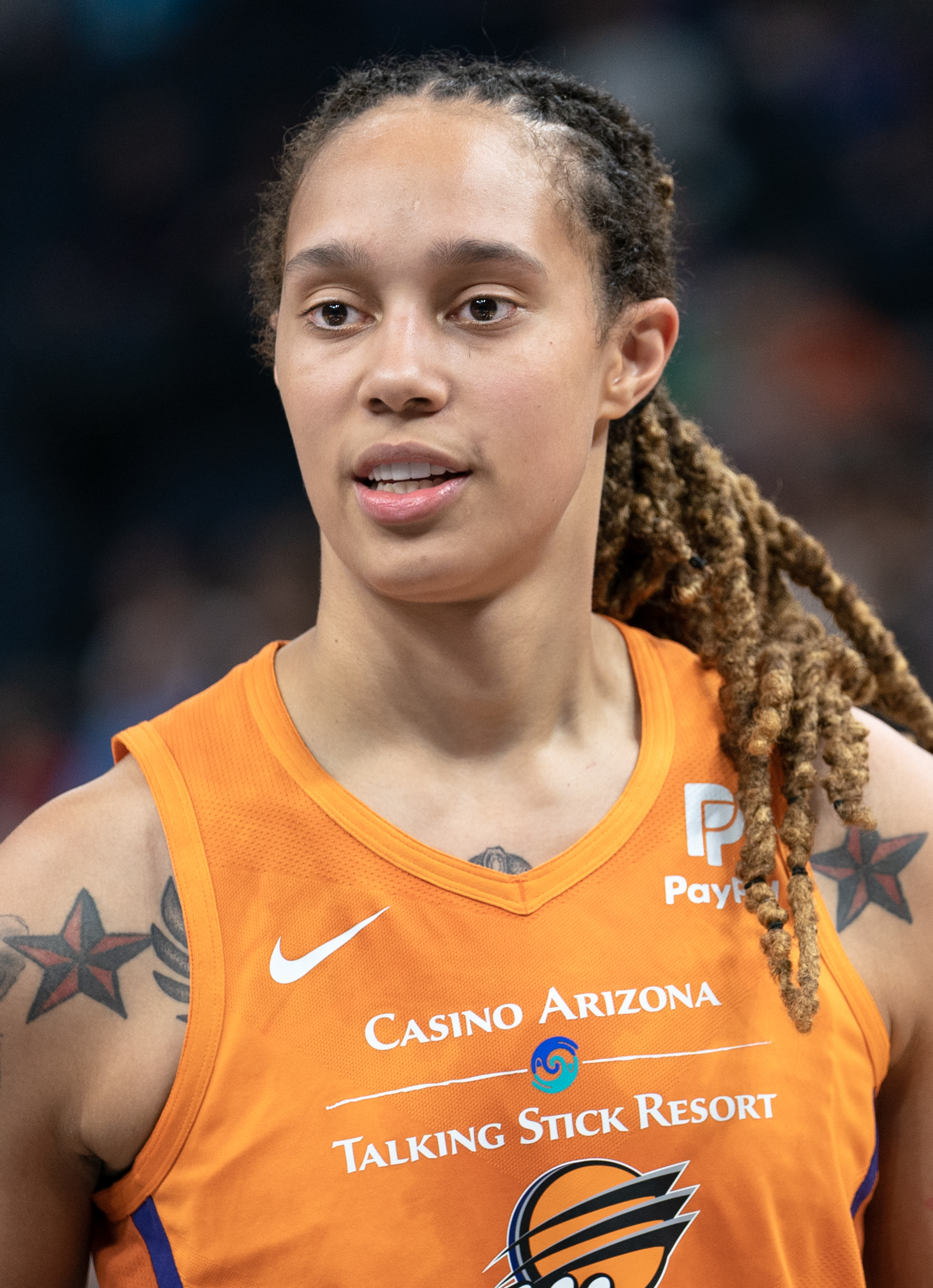
Brittney Griner

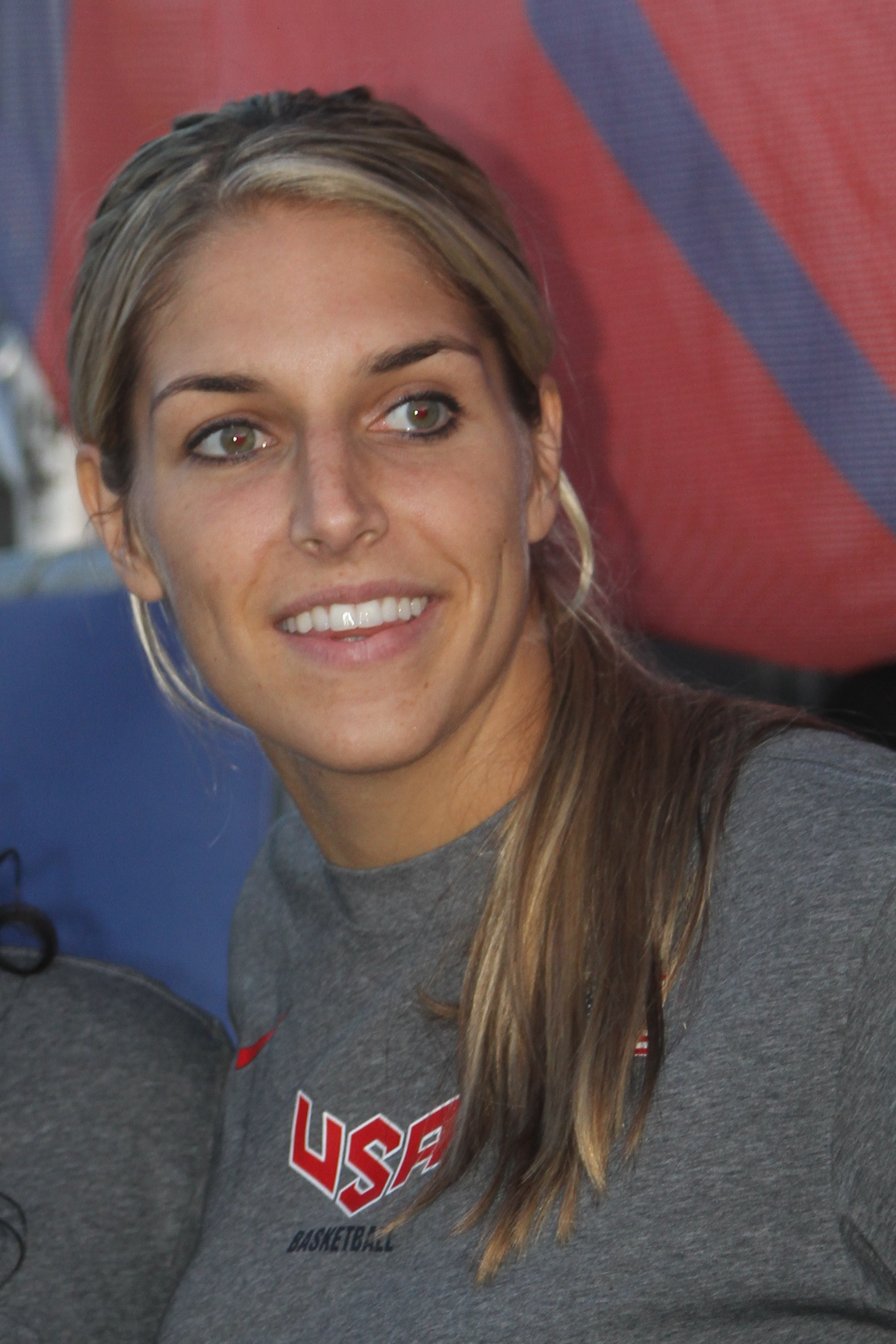
Elena Delle Donne

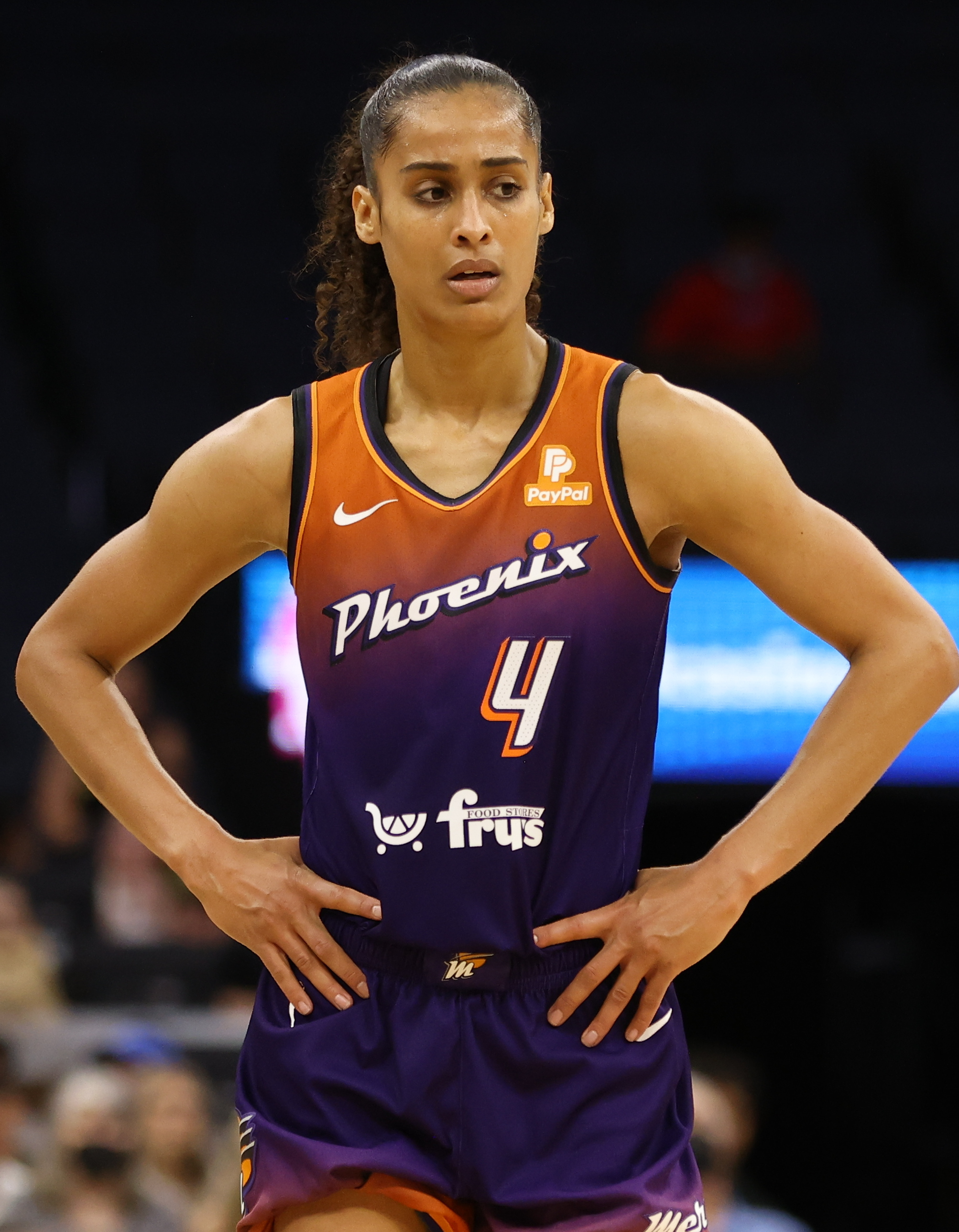
Skylar Diggins

Top three picks of the 2013 WNBA draft, labeled "The Three To See".

The much-publicized 2013 WNBA draft produced Baylor Bears center Brittney Griner, Delaware Fightin' Blue Hens forward Elena Delle Donne, and Notre Dame Fighting Irish guard Skylar Diggins as the top three picks. It was the first WNBA draft televised in prime time on ESPN after the league extended its TV deal with the network through 2022. Griner, Delle Donne, and Diggins were thus labeled "The Three To See".

The retirement of legends Ticha Penicheiro, Katie Smith, Sheryl Swoopes, and Tina Thompson coupled with the arrival of highly touted rookies and new rule changes effectively marked the end of an era for the WNBA and the ushering of another. The promotion of "The Three To See" helped boost TV ratings for the league by 28%, and half of the teams ended the 2013 season profitable. The improved health of the league was on display after the season; when the Los Angeles Sparks' ownership group folded, it took the league only a few weeks to line up Guggenheim Partners to purchase the team, and the franchise also garnered interest from the ownership of the Golden State Warriors. On the court, the Minnesota Lynx won their second title in three years, sweeping the Atlanta Dream in the 2013 Finals.

This narrative was reinforced by the 2014 Finals, which featured a matchup between the Phoenix Mercury (led by Griner and Diana Taurasi) and the Chicago Sky (led by Delle Donne and Sylvia Fowles) and became the most-watched series since 2003. The Mercury swept the first-time finalist Sky to cap a dominant season. They went 29–5 in the regular season, the best winning percentage since the 2001 Sparks.

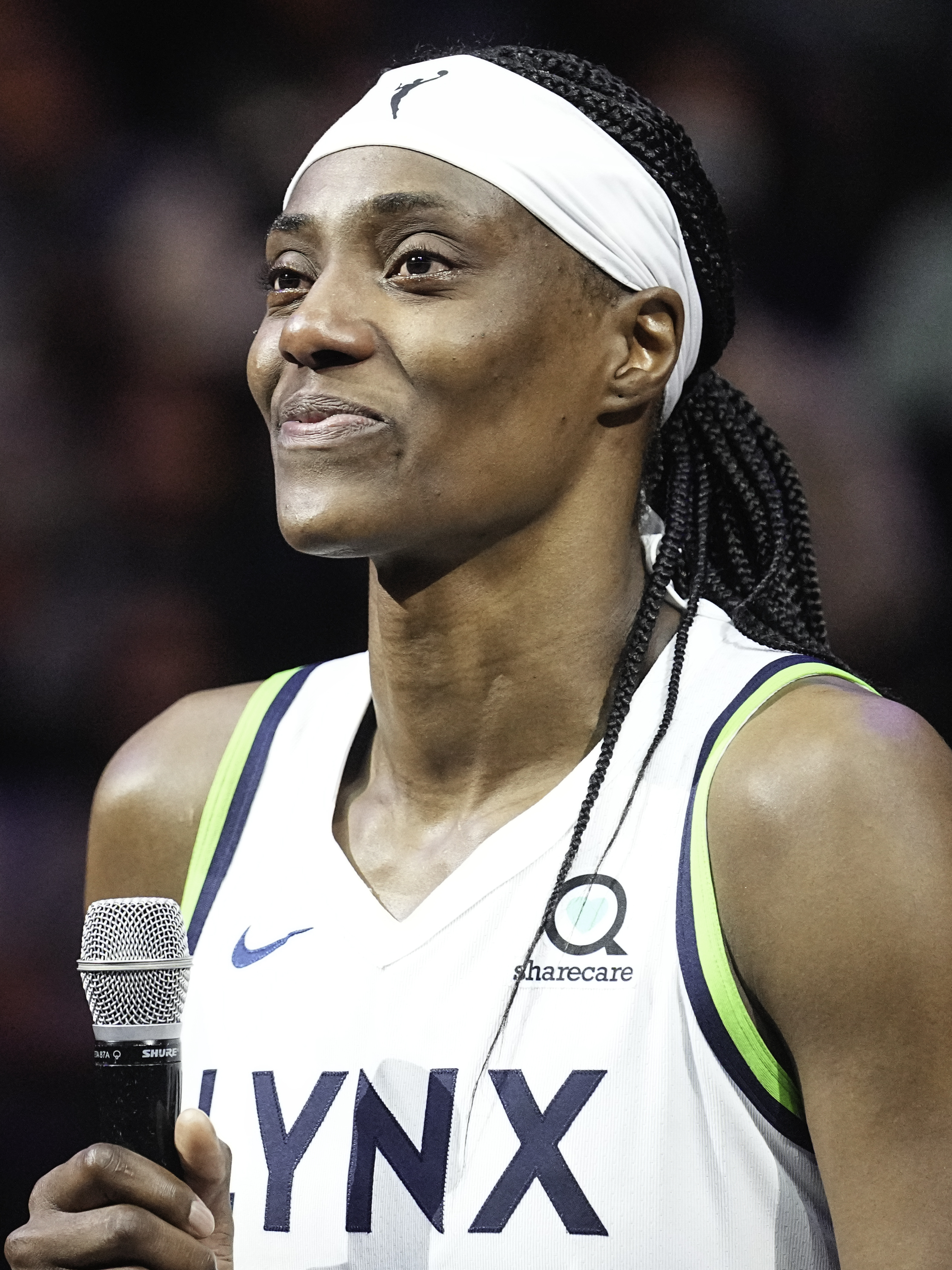
Sylvia Fowles, a two-time Finals MVP, two-time WNBA champion with the Lynx, and four-time Defensive Player of the Year

However, the 2015 season began without several stars from the previous Finals. Taurasi was paid by her Russian club, where she played during the WNBA offseason, to sit out the season, while Fowles refused to play for Chicago before she was traded to the Lynx in July. This proved enough to swing the balance, as the Lynx returned to the top by defeating the Indiana Fever in five games in the 2015 Finals. Fowles was named Finals MVP, helping the Lynx avenge their 2012 defeat. After the 2015 season, the Tulsa Shock moved to the Dallas–Fort Worth region and were renamed the Dallas Wings. The league also saw another change in leadership, as president Laurel J. Richie left her position in November 2015 and was succeeded by Lisa Borders in February 2016.

Beginning in 2016, the league abolished conference-based playoff seeding: the top eight teams by record, regardless of conference, advanced to the postseason, with the top two regular-season teams receiving byes directly to the semifinals. Coincidentally, the next two seasons were marked by a clear separation between two Western teams, the Lynx and the Sparks, and the rest of the league, culminating in back-to-back five-game Finals matchups. In the 2016 Finals, the Sparks, led by Candace Parker and Nneka Ogwumike, won their first championship since 2002, taking Game Five in Minnesota on a game-winning Ogwumike basket with 3.1 seconds left. The Lynx earned their revenge in the 2017 Finals, defeating the Sparks in five games. It marked Minnesota's fourth title in seven years and the final chapter of the franchise's dynasty—since after an unsuccessful 2018 season, Brunson, Moore, and Whalen all effectively retired from the league.

Following the 2017 season, the San Antonio Stars moved to Nevada, becoming the Las Vegas Aces. In October 2018, Borders stepped down as president. Mark Tatum served as interim president until May 2019, when Cathy Engelbert was named WNBA commissioner, a role that replaced the league's president title.

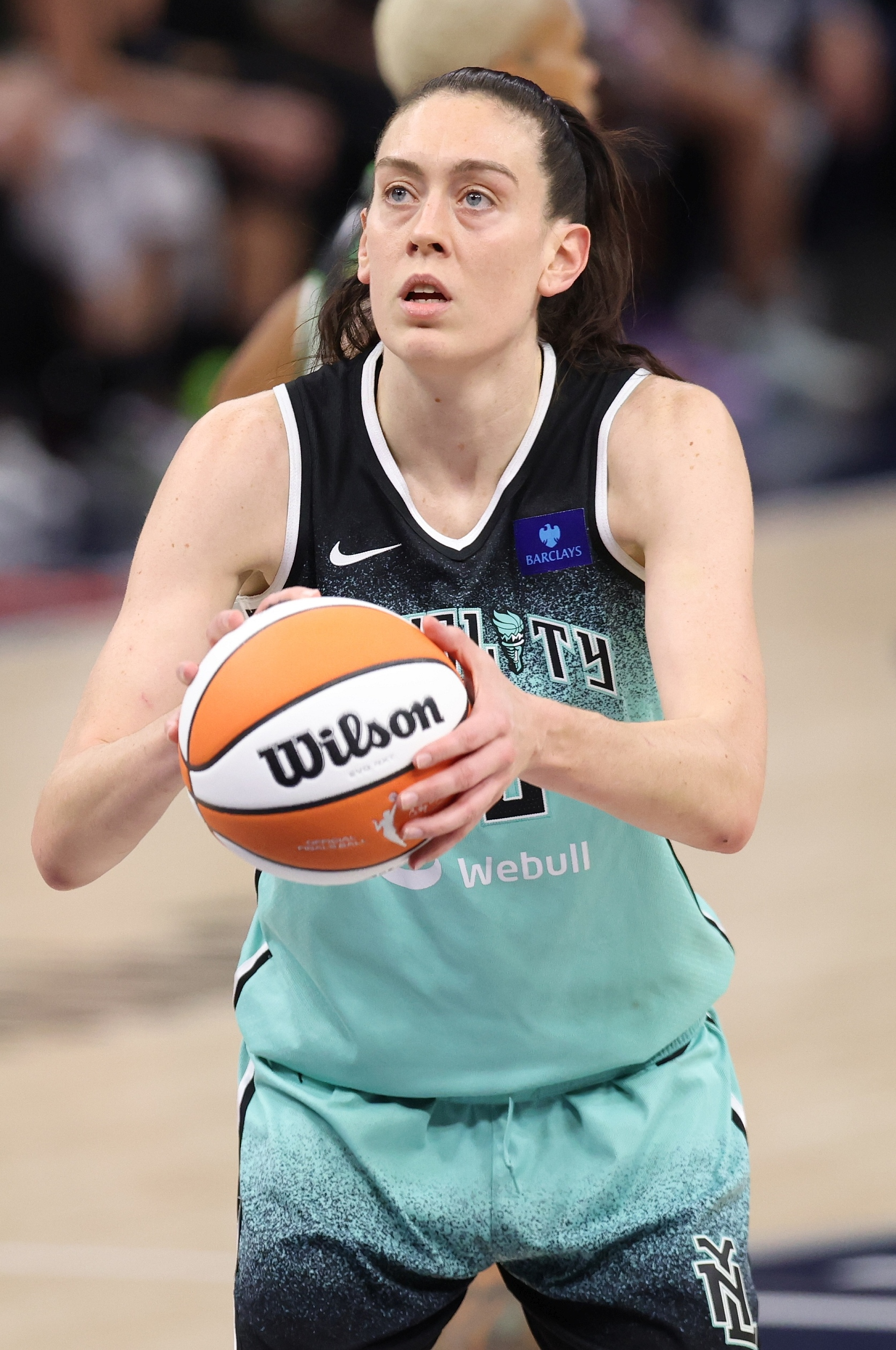
Breanna Stewart, a two-time MVP and three-time champion with the Seattle Storm and New York Liberty

After their 2010 championship, the Seattle Storm posted one winning season in the next seven years. However, this put them in position to draft back-to-back No. 1 overall picks for the second time in franchise history: Jewell Loyd in 2015 and Breanna Stewart in 2016. Alongside Sue Bird, they returned the Storm to the top in 2018. Their toughest playoff test came in a five-game semifinal series against the Mercury. In the Finals, Seattle swept the first-time finalist Washington Mystics, led by Delle Donne, who had been traded to Washington a year earlier.

With Stewart and Bird missing the 2019 season due to injuries, the Mystics dominated the regular season behind Delle Donne's MVP campaign and the first 50-40-90 season in WNBA history. Led by Mike Thibault, the winningest coach in WNBA history, the Mystics ran the best offense in league history, and returned to the Finals for a second straight year. There, they faced the Connecticut Sun, who reached the Finals for the first time since 2005—coincidentally, then coached by Thibault. The Mystics prevailed in five games to win their first championship in franchise history, as well as the first for Delle Donne and Thibault.

=== New collective bargaining agreement and expansion (2020–2023) ===
During the 2018 season, the WNBA players' union opted out of the collective bargaining agreement (CBA) with the league, which ended after the 2019 season. In January 2020, the league and union announced they had reached an agreement on a new CBA to take effect with the 2020 season and running through 2027, with an opt-out after 2025. The agreement increased player compensation by more than 50% and expanded benefits, including fully paid maternity leave. It also broadened free‑agency rights. In addition, the CBA introduced a "prioritization" clause that penalizes veteran players who report late to WNBA training camp after returning from overseas play.

Also in January 2020, the WNBA announced a new in-season tournament, the Commissioner's Cup, originally slated to debut in the 2020 season. On April 3, the WNBA announced that due to the COVID-19 pandemic, the beginning of the 2020 season would be postponed. The 2020 entry draft took place as originally scheduled on April 17, although it was done remotely. In June, WNBA commissioner Cathy Engelbert announced plans for a 22‑game regular season beginning in July, with a traditional playoff format, to be held exclusively at IMG Academy in Bradenton, Florida. The players were housed at the Bradenton complex, and all games and practices took place there. Several players opted out for medical or personal reasons. The reigning champion Mystics were particularly affected, with Delle Donne among those absent, and barely made the playoffs. The shortened regular season was largely dominated by the Seattle Storm and the Las Vegas Aces, who ultimately met in the Finals. It was the Aces franchise's first Finals appearance since 2008, and their first since relocating to Las Vegas. The Storm, back at full strength, swept their playoff run to win their second title in three years.

On March 15, 2021, it was announced that the WNBA would introduce a ceremonial logo, basketball, and uniforms as part of its 25th anniversary celebratory campaign called "Count It". Also for the campaign, the league unveiled The W25, a list of 25 players determined to be the league's greatest and most influential, as chosen by a panel of media and pioneering women's players.

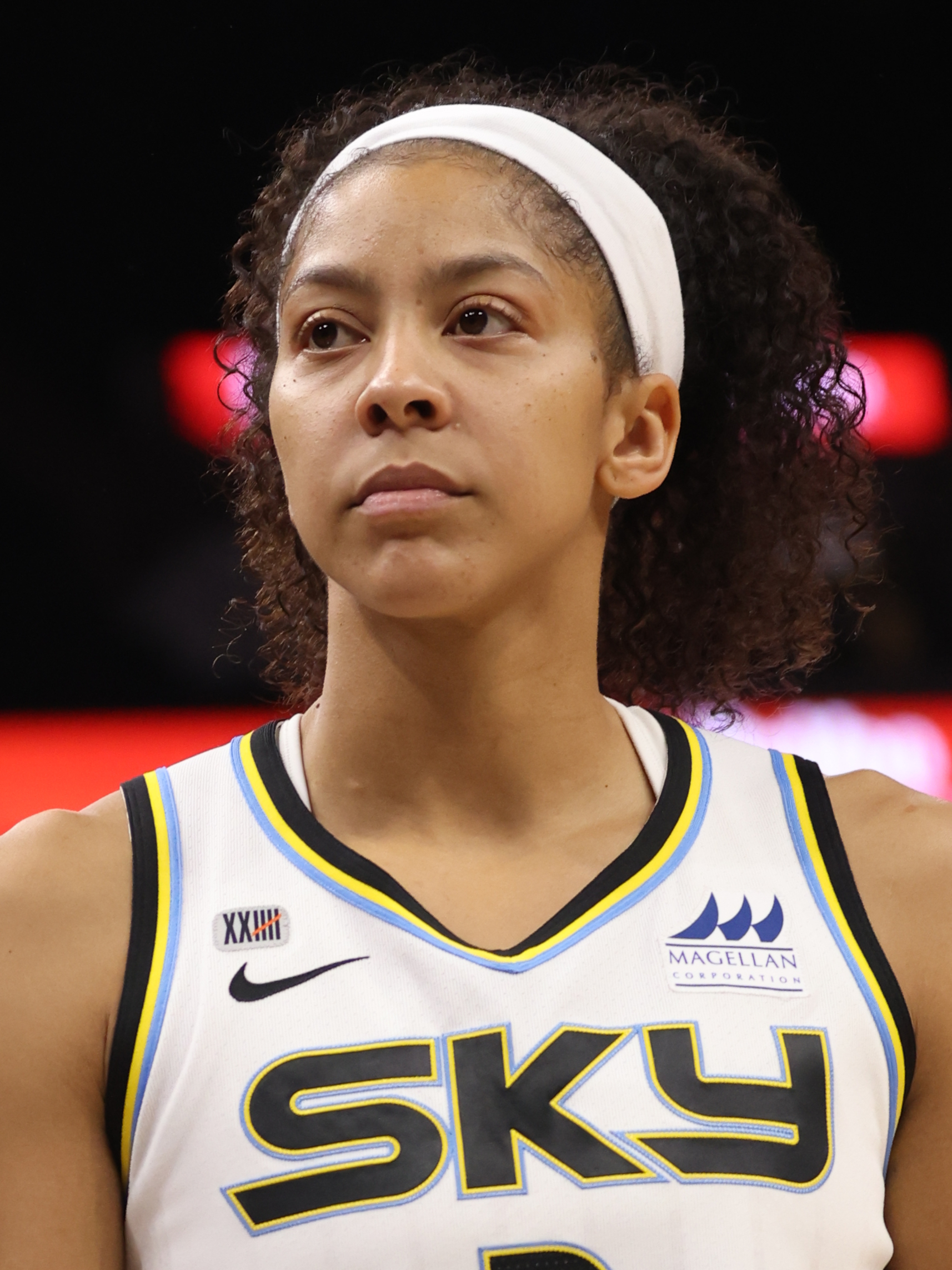
Candace Parker, the only player to win the MVP award as a rookie and the only player to win championships with three different teams.

The 2021 season largely returned to normal conditions and featured a 32‑game regular season with a month‑long Olympic break for the postponed 2020 Summer Olympics. The Commissioner's Cup officially debuted that year. The inaugural Cup Final, held on August 12 as the first game after the Olympic break, was streamed via Amazon Prime Video, and the reigning WNBA champions, the Seattle Storm, won the first edition by defeating the Connecticut Sun. Neither team replicated its success in the playoffs, and in a season full of twists, the 2021 WNBA Finals produced a rematch of the 2014 Finals between the fifth-seeded Phoenix Mercury and the sixth-seeded Chicago Sky. Benefiting from expanded free‑agency rights under the new CBA, the Sky were able to sign Candace Parker before the season to bolster their established core. Chicago prevailed in four games to win their first championship in franchise history.

In February 2022, the league raised $75 million in capital, on terms valuing the league at $475M. Under the deal, investors received 16% of the league's equity. In mid-2022, commissioner Cathy Engelbert confirmed that the league was actively considering expansion.

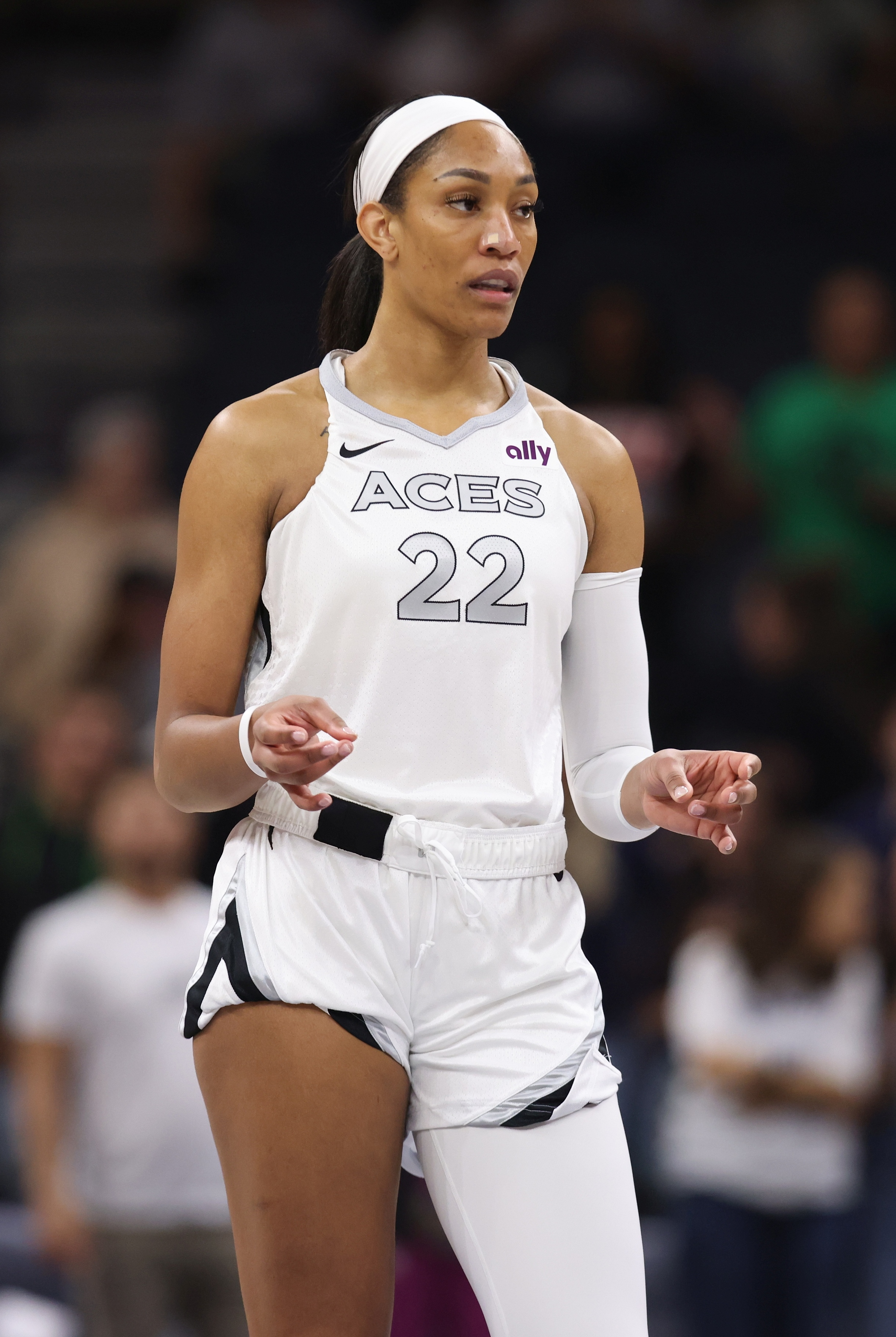
A'ja Wilson, a five-time MVP and three-time champion with the Las Vegas Aces

Before the 2022 season, the Las Vegas Aces signed head coach Becky Hammon to a then‑unprecedented $1M annual salary. The move was the latest in a series of ambitious investments by the team's new owner, Mark Davis, who purchased the franchise in February 2021, including the construction of a $40M dedicated training facility, the first of its kind in the league. The Aces' core included consecutive first-overall picks from 2017 to 2019—Kelsey Plum, A'ja Wilson, and Jackie Young—along with Chelsea Gray, whom they signed in free agency in 2021. In 2022, with the regular season expanded to 36 games, Las Vegas finished with the best regular‑season record and won the Commissioner's Cup. That season, the playoff format reverted to a traditional bracket without byes for top seeds and with a best‑of‑three first round. The Aces advanced to the Finals and defeated the Connecticut Sun in four games to win their first championship in franchise history.

The 2023 season was widely framed as a battle between two "superteams": the Aces and the New York Liberty. The Aces added Candace Parker in free agency, while the Liberty signed free agents Breanna Stewart and Courtney Vandersloot and traded for Jonquel Jones, joining 2020 first-overall pick Sabrina Ionescu in New York. The two franchises were frequently cited as examples of increased owner investment, and both drew league scrutiny, resulting in investigations or penalties, for providing player benefits beyond those stipulated by the CBA. That year, the league expanded the regular‑season schedule to 40 games. The season largely matched expectations: the two teams met in the Commissioner's Cup Final, which the Liberty won, and then again in the WNBA Finals. Despite playing without Parker throughout the playoffs and losing two starters to injury during the Finals, the Aces defeated the Liberty in four games and became the first repeat champions since the 2001–02 Los Angeles Sparks. The regular season was the most-watched in 21 years, and the Finals were the most-watched since 2003.

On October 5, 2023, the WNBA announced an agreement with the owners of the NBA's Golden State Warriors to bring a team to San Francisco, with a reported $50M expansion fee payable over 10 years. The Golden State Valkyries became the league's first expansion team since the Atlanta Dream in 2008 and joined as the 13th team in 2025. On May 23, 2024, the league announced that the Kilmer Group had acquired a franchise based in Toronto that would debut in 2026. On September 18, 2024, the league announced that the Bhathal family, owners of the Portland Thorns of the National Women's Soccer League (NWSL), had acquired a franchise based in Portland that would also debut in 2026.

=== Popularity surge and further expansion plans (2024–present) ===
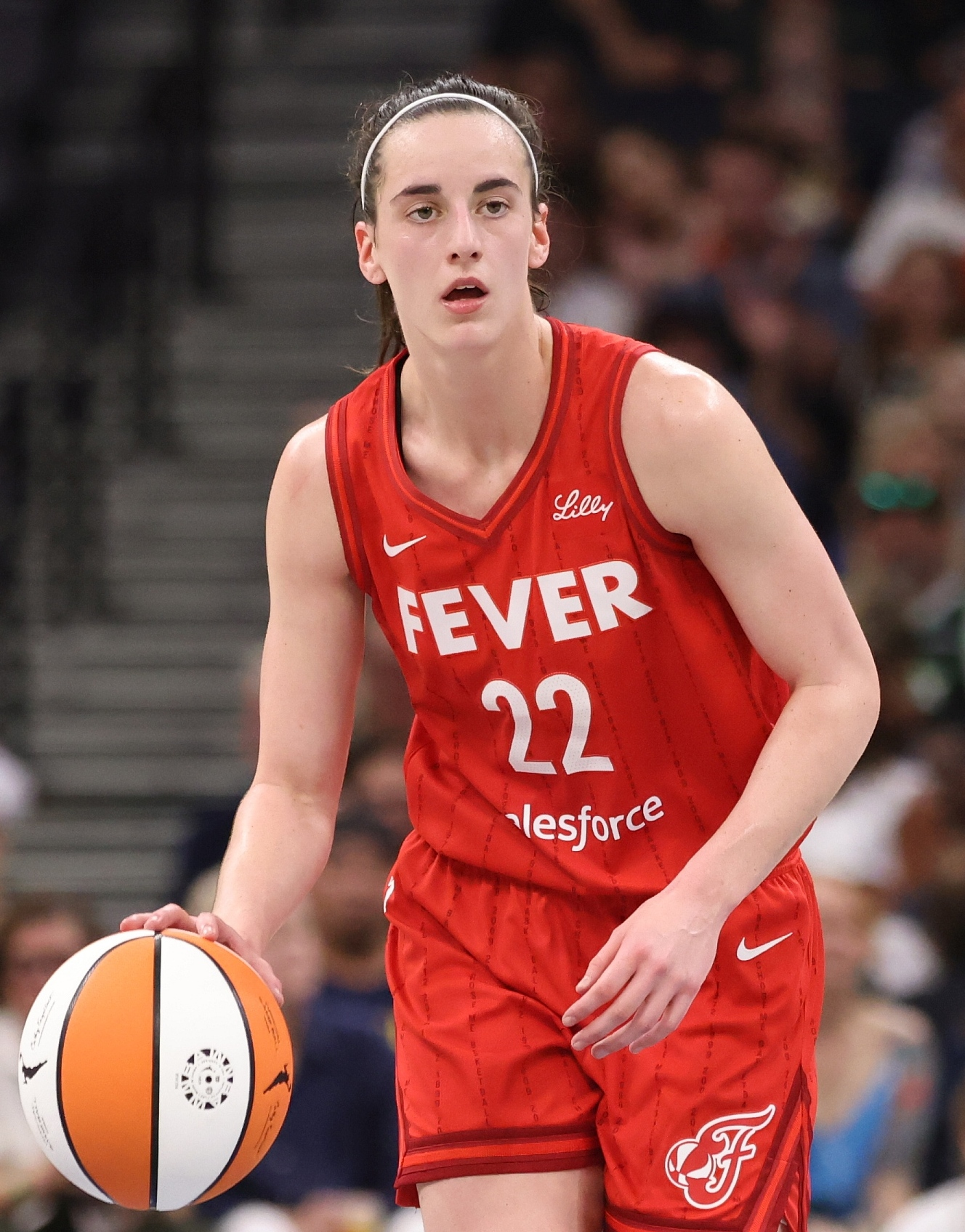
Caitlin Clark

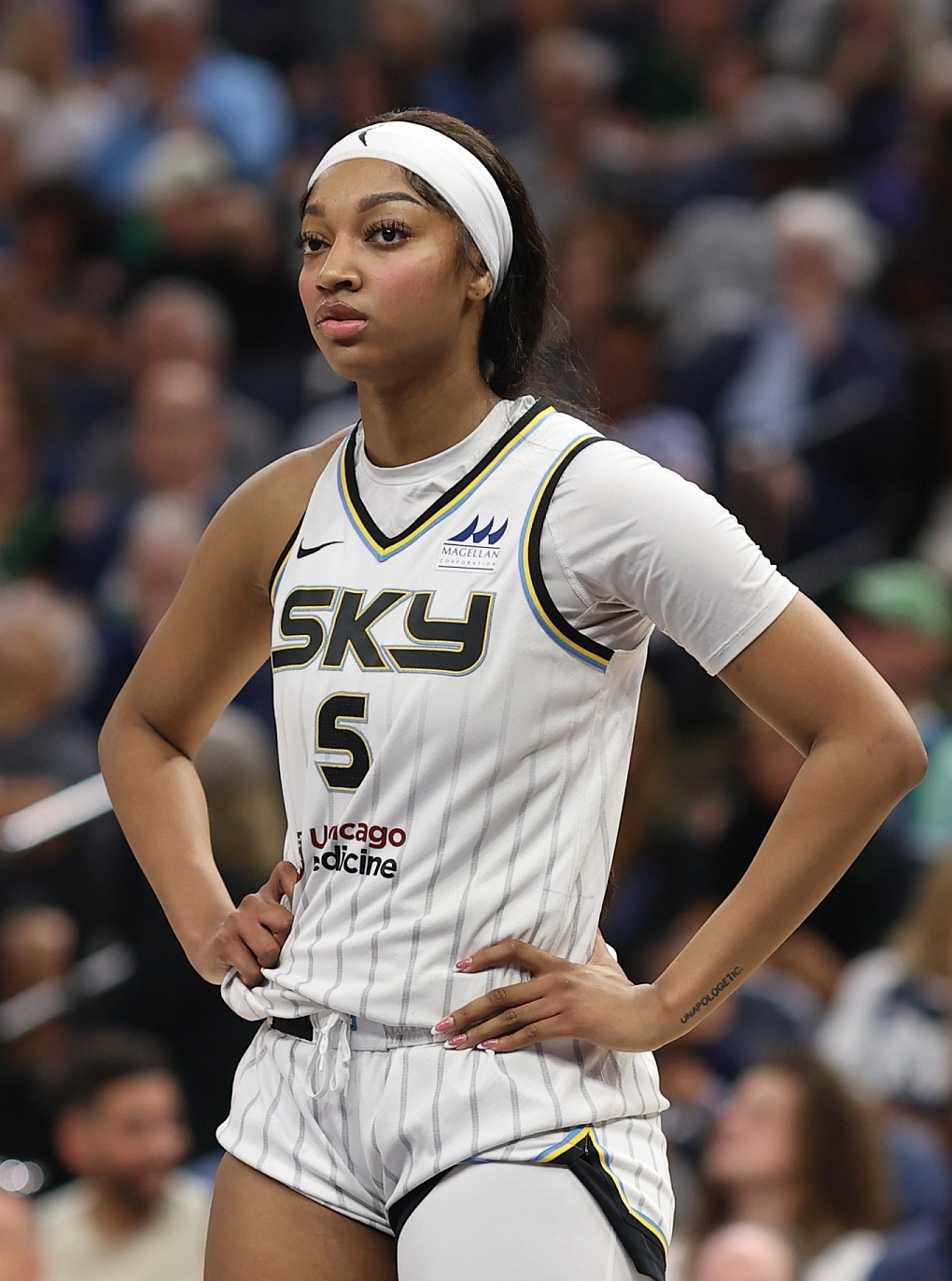
Angel Reese

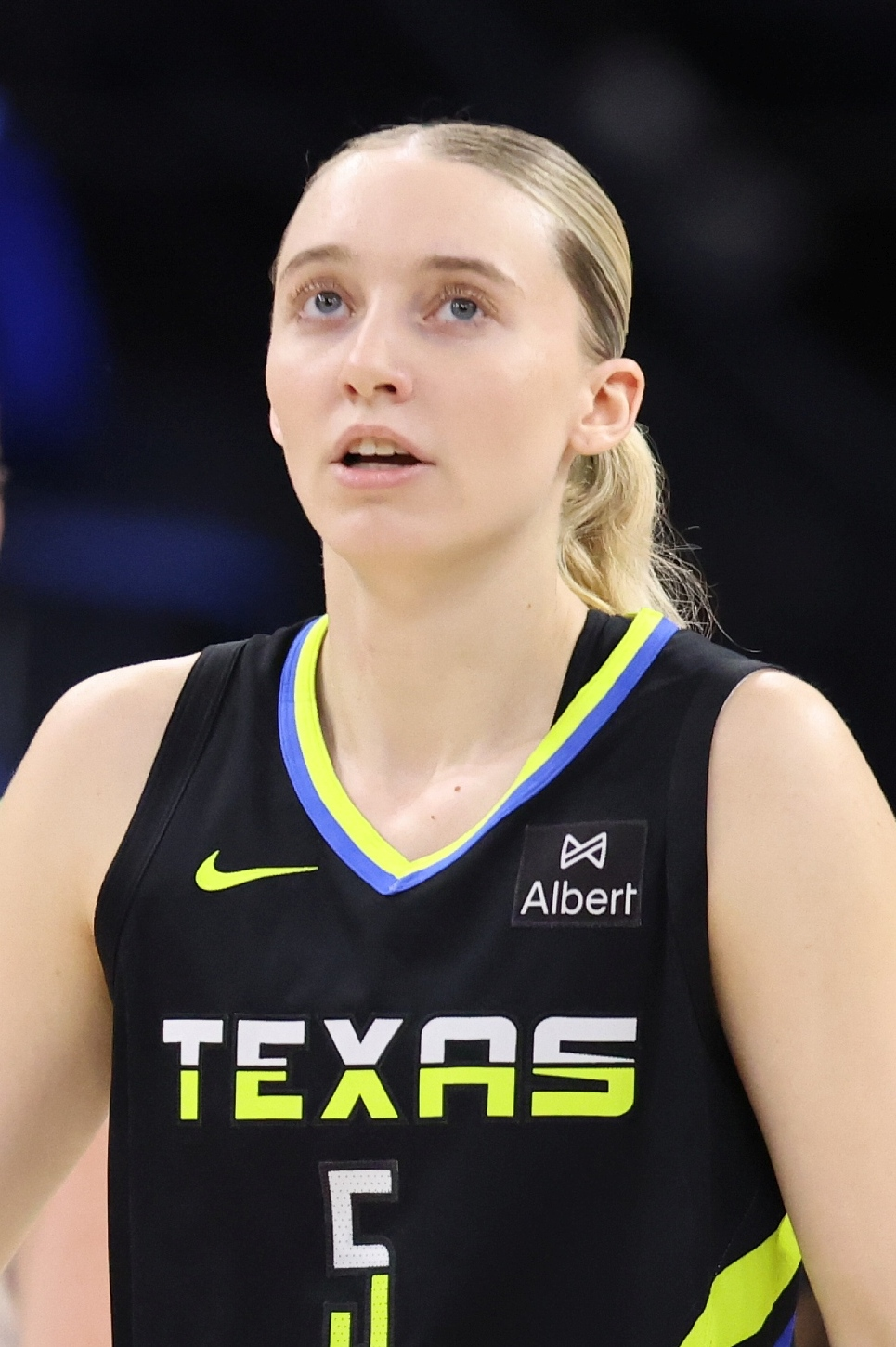
Paige Bueckers

Clark, Reese, and Bueckers were widely viewed as three of the leading new faces of the 2024–25 popularity surge.

The 2024 WNBA draft drew unprecedented attention amid surging interest and record viewership in women's college basketball, particularly the 2023 and 2024 NCAA championship games. The draft class was led by first-overall pick Caitlin Clark, who is widely regarded as the main driver of the surge in attention, and featured other highly followed players, including Angel Reese. The draft averaged 2.45M viewers, more than four times the previous record for a WNBA draft. It was the first of numerous viewership records set during the record-setting 2024 season, the majority of which involved Clark's Indiana Fever; games featuring both Clark and Reese proved a particular draw. The 2024 All-Star Game averaged 3.44M viewers, delivering the league's largest audience since its opening weekend in 1997. Attendance also rose, with the league and individual teams setting multiple highs, including a regular‑season record of 20,711 for a Mystics–Fever game in Washington. In July 2024, the league announced a new 11-year media deal worth $2.2 billion.

In 2024, the reigning champions, the Las Vegas Aces, faltered despite a historic season by A'ja Wilson. The New York Liberty and the Minnesota Lynx squared off in both the Commissioner's Cup Final, which the Lynx won, and the WNBA Finals. The five-game Finals were one of the closest in history, with two games going to overtime and two others decided by a single possession. For the first time in WNBA Finals history, a decisive Game Five went to overtime. The Liberty ultimately prevailed, after a controversial ending, to win their first championship in franchise history. The playoffs were no exception to the rising interest, and the Finals drew their largest audience in 25 years.

With the Golden State Valkyries joining the league, the 2025 season expanded to 44 games. Despite Clark and other stars missing significant time due to injuries, the league largely sustained upward trends in interest, viewership, and attendance, highlighted by the Valkyries immediately setting attendance records. Investment continued to rise across the league, and by the end of 2025, more than half of franchises had either opened or announced dedicated training facilities. On August 15, 2025, the Seattle Storm and the Atlanta Dream played the first-ever international WNBA regular-season game at Rogers Arena in Vancouver. The Lynx topped the regular‑season standings, but were upset by the Fever in the Commissioner's Cup Final and by the Phoenix Mercury in the playoffs. In the WNBA Finals, played in a best-of-seven format for the first time, the Mercury faced the Aces. Las Vegas struggled midseason but closed the regular season on a 16-game win streak, with Wilson earning a record fourth MVP. The Aces swept the Mercury to claim their third title in four years.

On June 30, 2025, the WNBA announced expansion teams in Cleveland, Detroit, and Philadelphia. The Cleveland team, later unveiled as the Sirens, is scheduled to begin play in 2028, followed by Detroit in 2029, and Philadelphia in 2030.

==== New collective bargaining agreement ====
In July 2025, during the WNBA All-Star Weekend, the WNBA players union (WNBPA) and league officials had a meeting regarding a new collective bargaining agreement (CBA). The CBA, which was signed in 2020, was set to expire in 2027, but in October 2024, the WNBPA exercised its right to opt out of the agreement, effective on October 31, 2025. More than 40 players were present at the meeting, which they described as a "missed opportunity", since neither side get any closer to a new deal. Meanwhile, Engelbert called the conversation "very constructive". Players had said that revenue sharing, salary structure, and prioritization were some of the key issues that they did not agree on. On July 19, before the All-Star Game, all players wore "Pay Us What You Owe Us" T-shirts during warmups and fans chanted "pay them!" in support after the game. In August, representatives of the WNBA and WNBPA had another meeting in New York to continue the negotiations. On October 30, both parties agreed to an extension, pushing the deadline for the CBA expiration for 30 days. On November 30, both agreed to a second extension, pushing the expiration deadline until January 9, 2026. On December 18, the WNBPA announced that the union had authorized the executive committee to "call a strike when necessary" as players continued negotiations with the league over a new CBA. If both sides hadn't reached an agreement, the league could have experienced a lockout, which has never happened in its history.

On March 24, 2026, the WNBA and its players' union finalized a new seven-year CBA extending to 2032. The agreement introduced a historic shift in the league's economic structure by directly linking player salaries to league revenue for the first time, with players receiving an average of 20% of total revenue. These changes facilitated a substantial increase in the teams' salary cap, which rose from $1.5M under the previous deal to $7M. In turn, player compensation saw a significant upward adjustment; the average player salary reached $583,000, and the supermax contract was established at $1.4M. Minimum salaries were also restructured to range between $270,000 and $300,000 based on a player's years of service.

The 2026 CBA also introduced key changes to the "Core" player designation, which allows a team to retain exclusive negotiating rights with a star player who would otherwise become an unrestricted free agent, in exchange for a one-year qualifying offer at the league's supermax salary level. The total number of times a player can be "cored" during their career was reduced from three to two. Furthermore, a service-year limit was established to ensure that, starting in 2027, players with seven or more years of experience can't be designated as core players, allowing them to reach unrestricted free agency.

The 2026 agreement introduced the "Exceptional Performance on Initial Contract" (EPIC) provision. This allows players to renegotiate the fourth year of their rookie scale contract and agree to a three-year extension if they meet specific performance criteria. Players who earn All-WNBA First or Second Team honors become eligible for a maximum salary in that fourth year, while those who win the league's Most Valuable Player award qualify for the supermax salary.

== Teams ==
The WNBA originated with eight teams in 1997. Through a sequence of expansions, contractions, and relocations, it will consist of 15 teams as of the 2026 season.

As of the 2026 season, the Las Vegas Aces (formerly known as the Utah Starzz and San Antonio (Silver) Stars), Los Angeles Sparks, New York Liberty, and Phoenix Mercury are the only remaining franchises that were founded in 1997.

Arenas listed below reflect those in use during the 2026 season.

Key
Symbol	Meaning
*	Franchise has relocated at some point in its existence

Overview of WNBA teams – 2026 season
Conference	Team	City	Arena	Capacity	Joined	Head coach
Eastern	Atlanta Dream	College Park, Georgia	Gateway Center Arena (Note: The Dream will move to State Farm Arena in downtown Atlanta in 2027.)	3,500	2008	Karl Smesko
Eastern	Chicago Sky	Chicago, Illinois	Wintrust Arena	10,387	2006	Tyler Marsh
Eastern	Indiana Fever	Indianapolis, Indiana	Gainbridge Fieldhouse	17,274	2000	Stephanie White
Eastern	New York Liberty	Brooklyn, New York	Barclays Center	17,732	1997	Vacant
Eastern	Toronto Tempo	Toronto, Ontario (Note: In their inaugural 2026 season, the Tempo played 15 home games at Coca-Cola Coliseum and three at Scotiabank Arena, both located in Toronto; two at Bell Centre in Montreal, and two at Rogers Arena in Vancouver.)	Coca-Cola Coliseum	8,700	2026	Sandy Brondello
Eastern	Washington Mystics	Washington, D.C.	CareFirst Arena	4,200	1998	Sydney Johnson
Western	Dallas Wings	Arlington, Texas	College Park Center (Note: The Wings will move to American Airlines Center in downtown Dallas for the 2027 season, followed by a permanent move to Dallas Memorial Auditorium, a venue within the downtown Kay Bailey Hutchison Convention Center, in 2028.)	7,000	1998*	Jose Fernandez
Western	Golden State Valkyries	San Francisco, California	Chase Center	18,064	2025	Natalie Nakase
Western	Houston Comets	Houston, Texas	Toyota Center	18,104	1999*	Rachid Meziane
Western	Las Vegas Aces	Paradise, Nevada	Michelob Ultra Arena	12,000	1997*	Becky Hammon
Western	Los Angeles Sparks	Los Angeles, California	Crypto.com Arena	19,079	1997	Vacant
Western	Minnesota Lynx	Minneapolis, Minnesota	Target Center	18,798	1999	Cheryl Reeve
Western	Phoenix Mercury	Phoenix, Arizona	Mortgage Matchup Center	17,071	1997	Nate Tibbetts
Western	Portland Fire	Portland, Oregon	Moda Center	19,393	2026	Alex Sarama
Western	Seattle Storm	Seattle, Washington	Climate Pledge Arena	18,300	2000	Sonia Raman

=== Future teams ===
Planned WNBA teams
Team	City	Arena	Capacity	Joining	Head coach
Cleveland Sirens	Cleveland, Ohio	Rocket Arena	19,432	2028	TBA
Detroit WNBA team	Detroit, Michigan	Little Caesars Arena	20,332	2029	TBA
Philadelphia WNBA team	Philadelphia, Pennsylvania	New South Philadelphia Arena	21,000	2030	TBA

=== Timeline ===
Current member Former member Relocated member Future member

=== Relationship with NBA teams ===
==== Share ownership ====
WNBA teams affiliated with an NBA team from the same market are known as sister teams. These include:

- The Golden State Valkyries and Warriors
- The Indiana Fever and Pacers
- The Los Angeles Sparks and Lakers
- The Minnesota Lynx and Timberwolves
- The New York Liberty and Brooklyn Nets
- The Phoenix Mercury and Suns
- The Washington Mystics and Wizards
- Starting in the 2027 season, the second Houston Comets, formerly the Connecticut Sun, and the Houston Rockets
- The Cleveland Sirens (2028) and Cavaliers
- Future expansion team Detroit (2029) and the Pistons
- Future expansion team Philadelphia (2030) and the 76ers

Of these teams, only the Mystics don't share an arena with their NBA counterpart; the Mystics primarily play at CareFirst Arena, although they also play select games at Capital One Arena when facing high-profile opponents.

The Liberty were previously associated with the New York Knicks, having been owned by the Knicks' parent company, the Madison Square Garden Sports Company, but the team was sold in January 2019 to a group led by Joseph Tsai, then a minority owner of the Nets and now sole owner of that team. The Liberty, which played at Madison Square Garden until 2017 and at Westchester County Center in suburban White Plains in 2018 and 2019, were then relocated to the Nets' home arena, Barclays Center, in downtown Brooklyn in 2020.

From 1997 to 2007, the Buss family owned and operated both the Sparks and Lakers, but in 2007, they sold the Sparks to an investment group led by Kathy Goodman and Carla Cristofferson. In 2014, the Sparks were then sold to a group led by Lakers legend Magic Johnson, and after Johnson's investment partner Mark Walter bought majority shares of the Lakers from the Buss family in 2025, both teams became sister teams again.

==== Share market with an NBA team, but not ownership ====
There are several WNBA teams that are in the same market as an NBA team, but are independently owned:

- The Atlanta Dream shared State Farm Arena with the Hawks from 2008 to 2016 and again in 2019, and currently shares the Gateway Center Arena with the Hawks' G League affiliate, the College Park Skyhawks, but will return to State Farm Arena in 2027. However, the Hawks have never held any ownership stake in the Dream.
- The Chicago Sky are not affiliated with the Bulls and play in a separate arena from their NBA counterpart.
- The Detroit Shock was the sister team of the Pistons until the teams' owner sold the Shock to investors who moved the team to Tulsa, Oklahoma. The franchise relocated again in 2016, this time to the Dallas–Fort Worth metroplex to become the Dallas Wings. However, the Wings are not affiliated with the Mavericks and also play in a separate arena— except in 2027, when the Wings will play in the Mavericks' arena before moving to a separate downtown Dallas venue in 2028.
- The Portland Fire plays in the Trail Blazers' home of Moda Center, but unlike the previous team, does not share ownership with the NBA team. The WNBA team instead shares ownership with Portland Thorns FC of the National Women's Soccer League.
- The Toronto Tempo are principally owned by Larry Tanenbaum independent of the Raptors' parent company Maple Leaf Sports & Entertainment (MLSE), although Tanenbaum was the former chairman for MLSE. Rogers Communications, the majority owner of MLSE, bought out Tanenbaum's share of the company in summer 2026.

==== Do not share market with an NBA team ====
Three teams do not share a market with an NBA counterpart:

- The Orlando Miracle was the sister team of the Magic until the team was sold to the Mohegan Sun casino, who relocated the franchise to Connecticut to become the Sun. However, they will be relocating to Houston to return as the Houston Comets in 2027 and will have the same owners as the Houston Rockets. (See above)
- The Utah Starzz was affiliated with the Jazz before relocating to San Antonio as the Silver Stars in 2003. The Silver Stars (shortened to Stars in 2014) were then paired with the San Antonio Spurs from 2003 through the 2017 season, but that relationship ended in October 2017 when the Stars were bought by MGM Resorts International and moved to Las Vegas to become the Aces.
- The Seattle Storm was formerly the sister team of the SuperSonics, but was sold to a Seattle-based group when the SuperSonics relocated to become the Oklahoma City Thunder.

== Season format ==
=== Regular season ===
Teams hold training camps in April and May. These allow the coaching staff to prepare the players for the regular season and determine the 12-woman roster with which they will begin the regular season. A series of preseason games is also played during this period.

The WNBA regular season begins in May. In 2023 and 2024, each team played 40 regular-season games, 20 each home and away. With the Golden State Valkyries joining the league in 2025, the regular season expanded to 44 games. As with the NBA, each team hosts and visits every other team at least once every season. In 2027, the regular season will expand to 50 games.

During years in which the Summer Olympics are held, the WNBA takes a month off in the middle of the season to allow players to practice and compete with their respective national teams. During years in which the FIBA World Cup was held, the WNBA would either take a break for the World Cup or end its season early, depending on the World Cup's scheduling. However, as of mid-2025, it was announced that the World Cup would move back its calendar starting in 2030 to avoid overlap with the WNBA season.

=== Commissioner's Cup ===
The 2020 season was planned to be the first for the Commissioner's Cup, an in-season tournament. Each team's first home and away games against each of its conference opponents, all of which were to be played in the first half of the season, were designated as Cup games. After each team played its 10 Cup games, the top team in each conference's Cup standings would advance to the Commissioner's Cup Final, a single match held in August. The COVID-19 pandemic caused the tournament to be delayed, instead launching in 2021 under the originally announced format.

The format was changed for the 2024 season. Each team now plays only one Commissioner's Cup game against each team in its conference, with either two or three games at home and the remainder away. All games in the first half of June are Cup contests. The Cup final, which remains a single game featuring the top teams in each conference's Cup standings, is now held near the end of June or at the start of July. Under both formats, all Cup games except the final count as regular-season games.

=== All-Star Game ===
In July, the regular season pauses to celebrate the annual All-Star Game. The first edition was held in 1999, the league's third season. The game is part of a weekend-long event, held in a selected WNBA city each year and played on the selected WNBA team's home court. Through the 2017 edition, the All-Star Game featured star players from the Western Conference facing star players from the Eastern Conference. Since 2018, conference affiliations have been ignored in team selections. During the season, voting for All-Star starters takes place among fans, WNBA players, and sports media members. The starters are selected by a weighted vote (fans 50%, players and media 25% each), while reserves are selected by the league's head coaches. The two players with the most fan votes are named team captains, who then fill out their teams in a draft format.

In 2004, The Game at Radio City was held in place of a traditional All-Star Game. The 2006 All-Star Game was the first game to feature custom uniforms that matched the decade anniversary logo. From 2008 through 2016, no All-Star Game was held in any Summer Olympic year. In 2010, an exhibition game (called Stars at the Sun) was held. Although the 2020 Summer Olympics were postponed to 2021 due to COVID-19, no All-Star Game was played in that season. The 2021 season featured the first All-Star Game in an Olympic year since 2000; this contest featured a WNBA all-star team facing the US national team. The 2024 game used the same format as in 2021, and was also an official All-Star Game.

Shortly after the All-Star break is the trading deadline. After this date, teams are not allowed to exchange players with each other for the remainder of the season—although, they may still sign and release players. Major trades are often completed right before the trading deadline.

=== Playoffs ===
The WNBA playoffs usually begin in September, though in years of the FIBA World Cup they may begin in August. (However, the World Cup announced it would move its calendar starting in 2030 to avoid overlap with the WNBA.) In the current system, the eight best teams by the regular-season record, without regard to conference alignment, qualify for the playoffs. Since 2022, the playoffs have been held in a standard knockout format, with the quarterfinals consisting of best-of-three series and the semifinals being best-of-five. The Finals were also best-of-five until being expanded to best-of-seven in 2025. Since 2021, Google has been the official sponsor of all playoff rounds except for the Finals, which are sponsored by YouTube TV.

Having a higher seed offers several advantages, including typically facing a weaker team and having home-court advantage in each round. In 2024, all quarterfinal series used a 2–1 home-court pattern, which allowed the higher seed the opportunity to win the series without having to visit the lower seed. This meant a lower seed that won one of the first two games would host the series decider. However, the quarterfinals returned to an odd-even pattern in 2025, with the higher seed hosting the first game and a potential third game.

The quarterfinals are bracketed in the normal manner for an 8-team tournament, with 1 vs. 8 and 4 vs. 5 on one side of the bracket and 2 vs. 7 and 3 vs. 6 on the other. The winners of each quarterfinal series advance to the semifinals, with the bracket not being reseeded. The semifinals use a 2–2–1 home-court pattern, meaning that the higher-seeded team will have home court in games 1, 2, and 5 while the other team plays at home in game 3 and 4.

=== Finals ===
The final playoff round, a best-of-seven series between the two semifinal winners, is known as the WNBA Finals and is held annually, currently scheduled in October. Each player on the winning team receives a championship ring. Also, the league awards a WNBA Finals Most Valuable Player (MVP). Since 2025, the Finals have used the same 2–2–1–1–1 pattern currently used by the NBA, meaning that the higher seed hosts games 1 and 2, the lower seed hosts games 3 and 4, and the teams alternate the last three games, all if necessary.

== Players and coaches ==
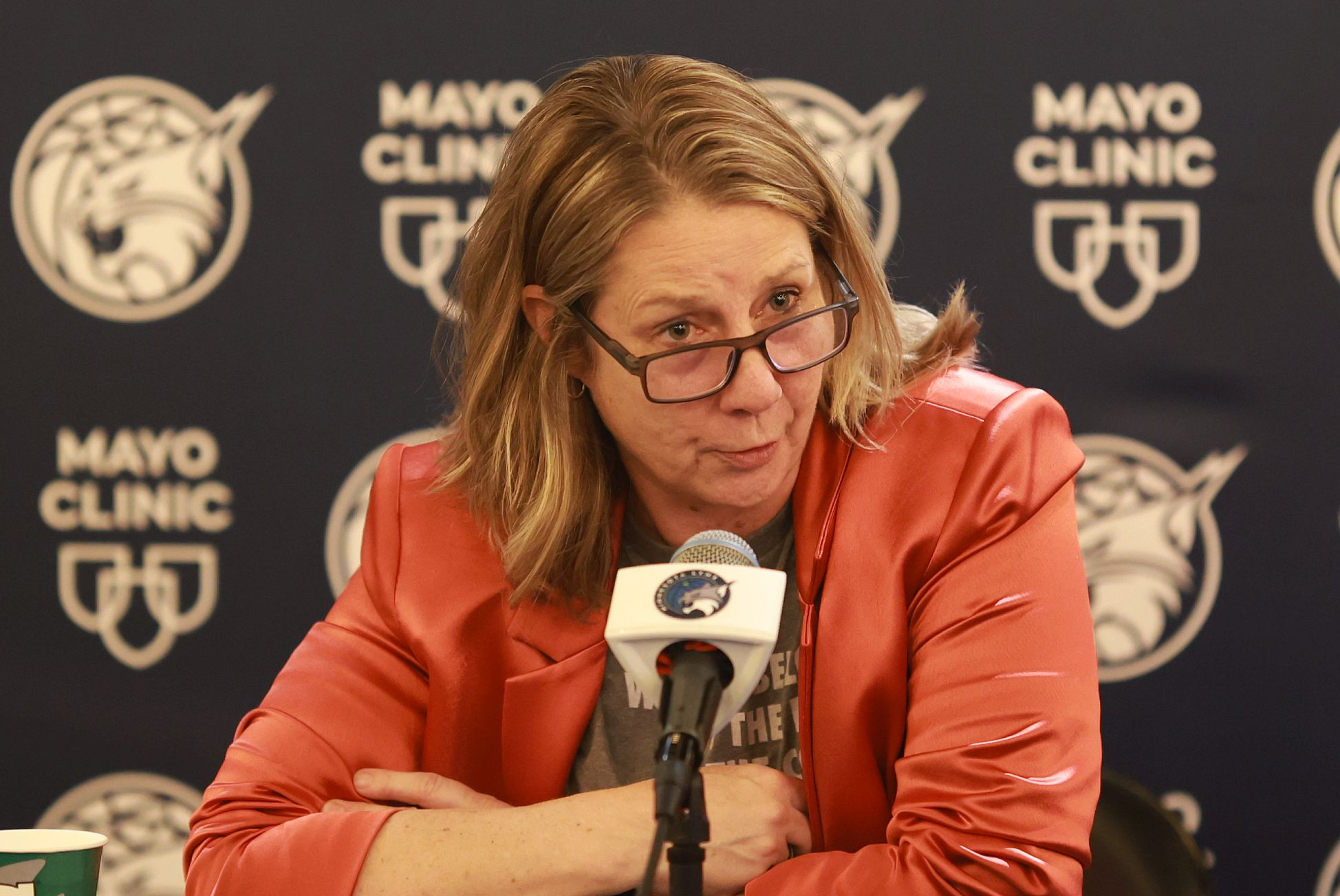
Cheryl Reeve Head Coach and President of Basketball Operations of the Minnesota Lynx, known for her coaching career and leadership in the WNBA.

In 2011, a decade and a half after the launch of the WNBA, only two players remained from the league's inaugural season in 1997: Sheryl Swoopes and Tina Thompson. Lisa Leslie was the longest-tenured player from the 1997 draft class; she spent her entire career (1997–2009) with the Los Angeles Sparks. Sue Bird holds both of the league's most significant longevity records—number of seasons in the league (19) and games played (580).

The members of the WNBA's All-Decade Team were chosen in 2006, on the WNBA's 10th anniversary, from 30 nominees compiled by fans, media, coach, and player voting. The team was to comprise the 10 best and most influential players of the first decade of the WNBA, with consideration also given to sportsmanship, community service, leadership, and contribution to the growth of women's basketball. Players for the WNBA's Top 15 Team were chosen in 2011 on the anniversary of the league's 15th season from amongst 30 nominees compiled similarly to that of the All-Decade Team process. This process was repeated for the league's 20th anniversary season in 2016 with the selection of the WNBA Top 20@20, and for the 25th anniversary season in 2021 with the selection of The W25.

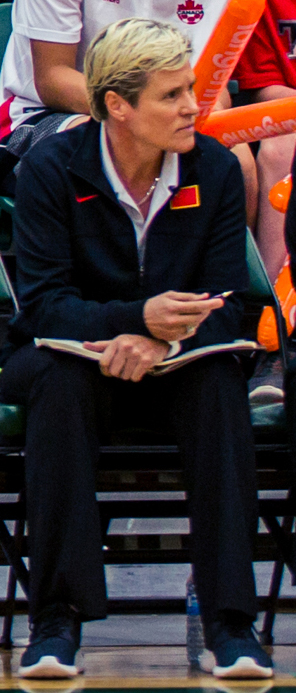
Michele Timms, known for her playmaking and leadership on the court.

Over 30 players have scored at least 3,000 points in their WNBA careers. Only 15 WNBA players have reached the 6,000 point milestone: Diana Taurasi, Tina Charles, DeWanna Bonner, Tina Thompson, Tamika Catchings, Nneka Ogwumike, Candice Dupree, Cappie Pondexter, Sue Bird, Candance Parker, Katie Smith, Sylvia Fowles, Lisa Leslie, Seimone Augustus and Lauren Jackson. The scoring average leader is A'ja Wilson of the Las Vegas Aces, with an average of 21.30 points per game.

In 2007, Paul Westhead of the Phoenix Mercury became the first person to earn both NBA and WNBA championship rings as a coach.

In 2008, 50-year-old Nancy Lieberman became the oldest player to play in a WNBA game. She signed a seven-day contract with the Detroit Shock and played one game, tallying two assists and two turnovers in nine minutes of action. By playing in the one game Lieberman broke a record that she had set in 1997 when she was the league's oldest player at 39. The oldest player to have participated in a full season is Diana Taurasi, who turned 42 early in the 2024 season.

=== Milestones ===
WNBA Milestones
Milestone	Player	Team	Date	Information
First player signed	Sheryl Swoopes	Houston Comets	October 23, 1996	Signed by the WNBA and assigned to Houston.
First points scored	Penny Toler	Los Angeles Sparks	June 21, 1997	Scored the first points on a baseline jump-shot.
First triple-double	Sheryl Swoopes	Houston Comets	July 27, 1998	14 points, 15 rebounds, 10 assists
First slam dunk	Lisa Leslie	Los Angeles Sparks	July 30, 2002	Dunked on a fast break against Miami
First 50–40–90 season	Elena Delle Donne	Washington Mystics	2019	51.5% FG, 43.0% 3FG, 97.4% FT
Most games played	Sue Bird	Seattle Storm	2002–2012, 2014–2018, 2020–2022	580 games
Most career points	Diana Taurasi	Phoenix Mercury	2004–2014, 2016–2024	10,646 points
Most career rebounds	Tina Charles	Connecticut Sun / New York Liberty / Washington Mystics / Phoenix Mercury / Seattle Storm / Atlanta Dream	2010–2013, 2025, 2014-2019, 2021–2022, 2024–2025	4,262 rebounds
Most career assists	Sue Bird	Seattle Storm	2002–2012, 2014–2018, 2020–2022	3,234 assists
Most career blocks	Brittney Griner	Phoenix Mercury / Atlanta Dream / Connecticut Sun	2013–2024, 2025, 2026	891 blocks
Most career steals	Tamika Catchings	Indiana Fever	2002–2016	1,074 steals
Most 3-pointers	Diana Taurasi	Phoenix Mercury	2004–2014, 2016–2024	1,447 3-pointers
Most points in a game	Liz Cambage	Dallas Wings	July 17, 2018	53 points
Most points in a game	A'ja Wilson	Las Vegas Aces	August 22, 2023	53 points
Most points in a game	Marina Mabrey	Toronto Tempo	June 25, 2026	53 points
Most rebounds in a game	Angel Reese	Atlanta Dream	August 24, 2026	26 rebounds
Most assists in a game	Caitlin Clark	Indiana Fever	July 17, 2024	19 assists
Most career regular season wins for a coach	Cheryl Reeve	Minnesota Lynx	2010–present	382 wins
Most career postseason wins for a coach	Cheryl Reeve	Minnesota Lynx	2010–present	50 wins
Most team points in one game	—N/a	Phoenix Mercury	July 24, 2010	127 points in double overtime against Minnesota
Most team points in a regulation game	—N/a	Toronto Tempo	June 25, 2026	125 points vs. Los Angeles Sparks
Largest margin of victory	—N/a	Minnesota Lynx	August 18, 2017	59-point win (111–52) over Indiana
Largest attendance for any game	—N/a	Detroit Shock	September 16, 2007	22,076 in game 5 of 2007 Finals
Largest attendance for a regular-season game	—N/a	Toronto Tempo	July 10, 2026	20,996 vs. Dallas Wings in Montreal

=== Awards ===
Around the beginning of September (or late August in Olympic and FIBA World Cup years), the regular season ends. It is during this time that voting begins for individual awards.

- The Sixth Player of the Year Award (known before 2021 as the "Sixth Woman" award) is given to the best player coming off the bench (must have more games coming off the bench than actual games started).
- The Rookie of the Year Award is given to the most outstanding first-year player.
- The Most Improved Player Award is given to the player who is deemed to have shown the most improvement from the previous season.
- The Defensive Player of the Year Award is given to the league's best defender.
- The Kim Perrot Sportsmanship Award is given to the player who shows outstanding sportsmanship on and off the court.
- The Coach of the Year Award is given to the coach who has made the most positive difference to a team.
- The Most Valuable Player Award is given to the player deemed the most valuable for her team that season.
- The Basketball Executive of the Year Award is presented to the team executive most instrumental in his or her team's on-court success in that season.
- A newer WNBA award, first presented to a team in 2017, is the season-long version of the monthly WNBA Cares Community Assist Award, presented to a player for especially meritorious community service. (Note: The Community Assist Award has been presented on a monthly basis during the season since 2008, but a season-long version was not presented until 2019.)
- The newest WNBA award is the Business Executive Leadership Award, first presented in 2025. It is awarded to the team president determined by league leadership to have excelled in leadership in driving business transformation.

Also named are the All-WNBA Teams, the All-Defensive Teams, and the All-Rookie Team; each consists of five players. (In all cases, a tie in voting may lead to a team containing six players instead of five.)

- There are two All-WNBA teams; each consists of five top players selected without regard to position, with first-team status being the most desirable.
- There are two All-Defensive teams; since 2005, each consists of the top defenders regardless of position.
- There is one All-Rookie team, consisting of the top five first-year players regardless of position since 2005.

==== Most recent award winners ====
All listed winners are from the 2026 season unless noted otherwise.

Award		Winner	Team	Position	Votes/Statistic (Note: "Votes" listed are first-place votes, except as noted, although the winners for all WNBA awards apart from the statistically based Peak Performer Awards are determined by points earned rather than only first-place votes.)	Ref.
Peak Performers	Points	A'ja Wilson	Las Vegas Aces	Center	26.2 ppg	
Peak Performers	Rebounds	Angel Reese	Atlanta Dream	Forward	12.1 rpg	
Peak Performers	Assists	Alyssa Thomas	Phoenix Mercury	Forward	8.5 apg	
Coach of the Year		Cheryl Reeve	Minnesota Lynx	Head Coach	40 out of 74	
Rookie of the Year		Olivia Miles	Minnesota Lynx	Point Guard	74 out of 74	
Most Improved Player		Jessica Shepard	Dallas Wings	Forward	29 out of 74	
Defensive Player of the Year		Angel Reese	Atlanta Dream	Forward	46 out of 74	
Sixth Player of the Year		Janelle Salaün	Golden State Valkyries	Forward	74 out of 74	
Most Valuable Player (MVP)		A'ja Wilson	Las Vegas Aces	Center	65 out of 74	
Executive of the Year		Cheryl Reeve	Minnesota Lynx	General Manager	13 ballots	
Kim Perrot Sportsmanship Award		Nneka Ogwumike	Los Angeles Sparks	Power Foward	38 out of 74	
WNBA Finals Most Valuable Player		Gabby Williams	Golden State Valkyries	Foward		

=== Retired numbers ===
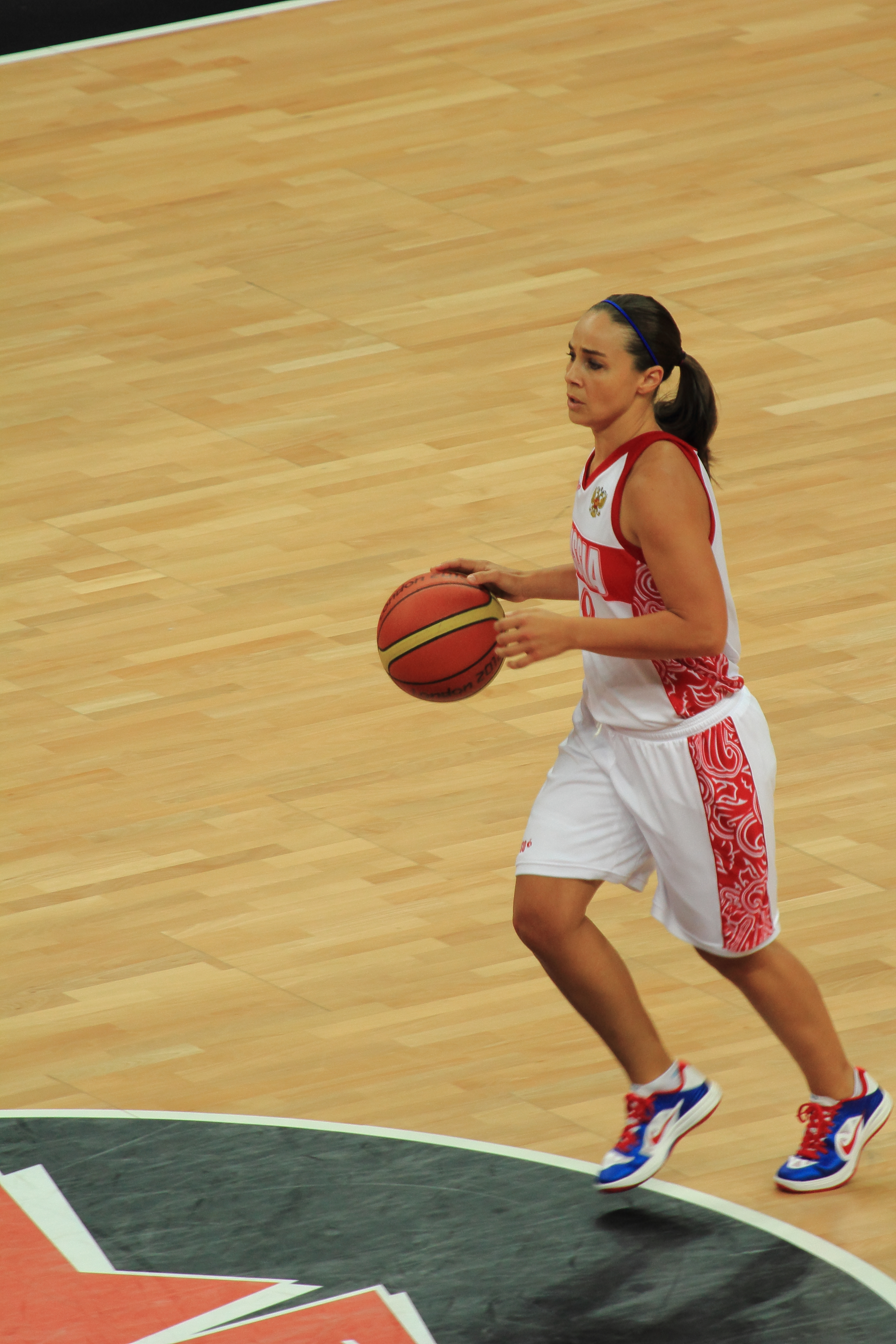
Becky Hammon known for her basketball IQ and contributions to the game.

No.	Team	Player	Pos.	Tenure (Note: Reflects tenure with the team that retired the player's number; not necessarily identical to the player's WNBA tenure.)	Ref.
14	Chicago Sky	Allie Quigley	G	2013–2022	
3	Chicago Sky	Candace Parker	F	2021–2022	
25	Connecticut Sun	Alyssa Thomas (Note: Thomas was still active with the Phoenix Mercury when the Sun retired her number.) (Note: The Sun retired several numbers in 2026, during their final season before relocating to Houston. It remains to be seen whether the relocated team will honor any of these retirements.)	F	2014–2024	
31	Connecticut Sun	Tina Charles	C	2010–2013, 2025	
35	Connecticut Sun	Jonquel Jones (Note: Jones was still active with the New York Liberty when the Sun retired her number.)	C	2016–2022	
24	Indiana Fever	Tamika Catchings	SF	2002–2016	
25	Las Vegas Aces	Becky Hammon (Note: Number retired by the franchise when it was playing as the San Antonio Stars. Hammon played the last eight seasons of her WNBA career in San Antonio. The Aces, which honored the number's retirement by the Stars, held a second number retirement ceremony for Hammon on September 13, 2021.)	G	2007–2014	
3	Los Angeles Sparks	Candace Parker	F	2008–2020	
9	Los Angeles Sparks	Lisa Leslie	C	1997–2009	
11	Los Angeles Sparks	Penny Toler	G	1997–1999	
13	Minnesota Lynx	Lindsay Whalen	G	2010–2018	
23	Minnesota Lynx	Maya Moore	F	2011–2018	
32	Minnesota Lynx	Rebekkah Brunson	F	2010–2018	
33	Minnesota Lynx	Seimone Augustus	G	2006–2019	
34	Minnesota Lynx	Sylvia Fowles	C	2015–2022	
3	Phoenix Mercury	Diana Taurasi	G	2004–2024	
7	Phoenix Mercury	Michele Timms	G	1997–2001	
13	Phoenix Mercury	Penny Taylor	G/F	2004–2016	
22	Phoenix Mercury	Jennifer Gillom	F	1997–2002	
32	Phoenix Mercury	Bridget Pettis	G	1997–2006	
15	Seattle Storm	Lauren Jackson	F/C	2001–2012	
10	Seattle Storm	Sue Bird	G	2001–2022 (Note: Bird missed the 2013 and 2019 seasons to injuries.)	

=== Notable international players ===
A number of international players that have played in the WNBA have earned multiple all-stars or won MVP awards:

- Janeth Arcain, Brazil – four-time WNBA champion with the Houston Comets (1997–2000), one-time All-Star (2001) and Most Improved Player Award (2001)
- Elena Baranova, Russia – among the first international players in the WNBA (1997), one-time All-Star (2001)
- Zheng Haixia, China – first winner of the Kim Perrot Sportsmanship Award, first international player to win a WNBA award (1997)
- Margo Dydek, Poland – first international player to be No. 1 draft pick (1998), tallest player in WNBA history (7ft 2in tall)
- Ticha Penicheiro, Portugal – WNBA champion with the Sacramento Monarchs (2005), four-time All-Star
- Lauren Jackson, Australia – two-time WNBA champion with the Seattle Storm (2004, 2010), three-time WNBA MVP, eight-time All-Star
- Penny Taylor, Australia – three-time WNBA champion with the Phoenix Mercury (2007, 2009, 2014), four-time All-Star
- Tammy Sutton-Brown, Canada – two-time All-Star
- Sophia Young, Saint Vincent and the Grenadines – four-time All-Star
- Sancho Lyttle, Saint Vincent and the Grenadines – two-time All-Star
- Liz Cambage, Australia – four-time All-Star
- Emma Meesseman, Belgium – WNBA champion with the Washington Mystics (2019), two-time All-Star, 2019 WNBA Finals MVP
- Jonquel Jones, The Bahamas – WNBA champion with the New York Liberty, five-time All-Star, 2017 Most Improved Player, 2018 Sixth Player of the Year, 2021 WNBA MVP, 2023 WNBA Commissioner's Cup MVP, 2024 WNBA Finals MVP, 2026 WNBA All-Star Game MVP
- Satou Sabally, Germany – three time All-Star, 2023 Most Improved Player

Some of these players, among them Jones, Lyttle, Penicheiro, Sabally, Sutton-Brown, and Young played U.S. college basketball.

== Rules and regulations ==
Rules are governed by standard basketball rules as defined by the NBA, with a few notable exceptions:

- WNBA and NBA team sizes differ, with 12 players per WNBA roster and 15 per NBA roster.
- The three-point line is 22 ft 1.75 in (6.75 m) from the center of the basket, with a distance of 22 ft (6.71 m) at the corners. The main arc is essentially identical to that used by FIBA (effective October 1, 2012, for domestic competitions) and the NCAA (effective in 2019–20 in Division I and 2020–21 in Divisions II and III for men, and in 2021–22 for all women's divisions). The WNBA corner distance, as measured from the center of the basket, is identical to that of the NBA; the FIBA and NCAA distance at the corners is 4 in (10.16 cm) shorter.
- The regulation WNBA ball is a minimum 28.5 inches (72 cm) in circumference and weighs 20.0 ounces (570 g), 1 inch (2.5 cm) smaller and 2 ounces (57 g) lighter than the NBA ball. Since 2004, this size has been used for all senior-level women's competitions throughout the world in full-court basketball. Competitions in the half-court 3x3 variant used the women's ball until 2015, when a dedicated ball with the circumference of the women's ball but the weight of the men's ball was introduced. Wilson became the WNBA ball supplier in 2022. Spalding had been the ball supplier since 1997.
- WNBA quarters are 10 minutes in duration instead of the NBA's 12 minutes. As such, the WNBA gets fewer timeouts—five with one "reset timeout" for a game's final minutes—while the NBA gets seven timeouts per team per game.

Games are divided into four 10-minute quarters as opposed to the league's original two 20-minute halves of play, similar to FIBA and NCAA women's college rules.

A trend with new WNBA rules has been to match them with a similar NBA rule. Since the 2006 WNBA season:

- The winner of the opening jump ball begins the 4th quarter with the ball out of bounds. The loser begins with the ball out of bounds in the second and third quarters. Previously under the two-half format, both periods started with jump balls, presumably to eliminate the possibility of a team intentionally losing the opening tip to gain the opening possession of the second half. This is not a problem under the four-quarters because the winner of the opening tip gets the opening possession of the final period.
- The shot clock was decreased from 30 to 24 seconds, matching the FIBA and NBA shot clocks. Starting in 2020, the last five seconds of the shot clock counted down in tenths of a second.

The 2007 WNBA season brought changes that included:

- The amount of time that a team must move the ball across the half-court line went from 10 to 8 seconds.
- A referee can grant time-outs to either a player or the coach.
- Two free throws and possession of the ball for a clear-path-to-the-basket foul. Previously only one free throw was awarded as well as possession.

In 2012, the WNBA added the block/charge arc under the basket. As of 2013, the defensive three-second rule and anti-flopping guidelines were introduced. The three-point line was also extended; in 2017, that line extended into the corners to match the NBA's.

Since 2017, Tissot is the official timekeeper for the league, as it uses a unified game clock/shot clock system.

=== Court dimensions ===
All dimensions are in line with NBA regulations except the main three-point arc. The three-point distance at the corners is identical in the NBA and WNBA.

WNBA Court Dimensions
Area	Imperial	Metric
Length of court (baseline to baseline)	94 ft	28.65 m
Width of court (sideline to sideline)	50 ft	15.24 m
Rim height (floor to rim)	10 ft	3.05 m
Center circle diameter	12 ft	3.66 m
Three-point line distance from center of basket	22 ft 1.75 in	6.75 m
Three-point line distance from center of basket (corners)	22 ft	6.71 m
Shaded area/Lane/Key length	19 ft	5.8 m
Shaded area/Lane/Key width	16 ft	4.88 m
Restricted area (aka "block/charge arc") (distance from center of basket)	4 ft	1.22 m
Free-throw line (distance from backboard)	15 ft	4.57 m
Free-throw half-circle radius	6 ft	1.83 m
Backboard width (side to side)	6 ft	1.83 m
Coaching box width (from baseline)	28 ft	8.54 m

=== Player eligibility controversy ===
In July 2026, Sophie Cunningham spoke out against the inclusion of trans women in women's sports, leading to rallies in support of Cunningham outside her games, and comments in favor of transgender inclusion by some coaches. In August, former NBA players Enes Kanter Freedom and Royce White declared that they would identify as trans women and apply for the 2027 WNBA draft to challenge the support of trans women in the WNBA.

WNBA commissioner Cathy Engelbert reacted by sending a memo to teams addressing ongoing discussions around transgender athletes in women's basketball, making clear that the topic would be discussed further by a task force of team presidents and general managers at a previously scheduled meeting the following week. Following the meeting, a league spokesperson said in a statement: "There are no immediate eligibility matters affecting the WNBA, and we strongly denounce the bad-faith efforts to use these topics to demean or marginalize others."

== Business ==
=== Finance ===
In 2007, teams were estimated to be losing $1.5–$2 million a year. In total, the league projected losses through the 2010 season to be around $400M. In December 2010, Donna Orender said the league had its first-ever "cash flow positive" team during the 2010 season. In 2011, three teams were profitable. In 2013, six of the league's 12 teams reported a profit. However, in 2018, NBA Commissioner Adam Silver revealed that the WNBA had lost an average of more than $10M annually, which would amount to at least $280M in losses since the WNBA's inception in 1997.

By the 2024 season, the WNBA has seen revenue grow rapidly through a variety of avenues. These included raising capital, re-negotiating their media rights deal, expansion fees, increased ticket sales, and establishing new strategic partnerships and sponsorships with organizations. Still, 40% of the revenue generated by the WNBA goes to the teams and players, with the remainder going to the NBA and outside investors. Overall, the league is expected to have lost $50M for the 2024 season.

In 2025, the WNBA generated enough revenue to begin revenue sharing with its players, marking the first time in WNBA history it was able to do so. It is estimated that the WNBA made at least $200M in revenue in 2025. As part of the revenue sharing, the WNBA's 13 teams received $8M from the league to disperse to players, while another $8M was allocated to league marketing agreements.

=== Activism ===
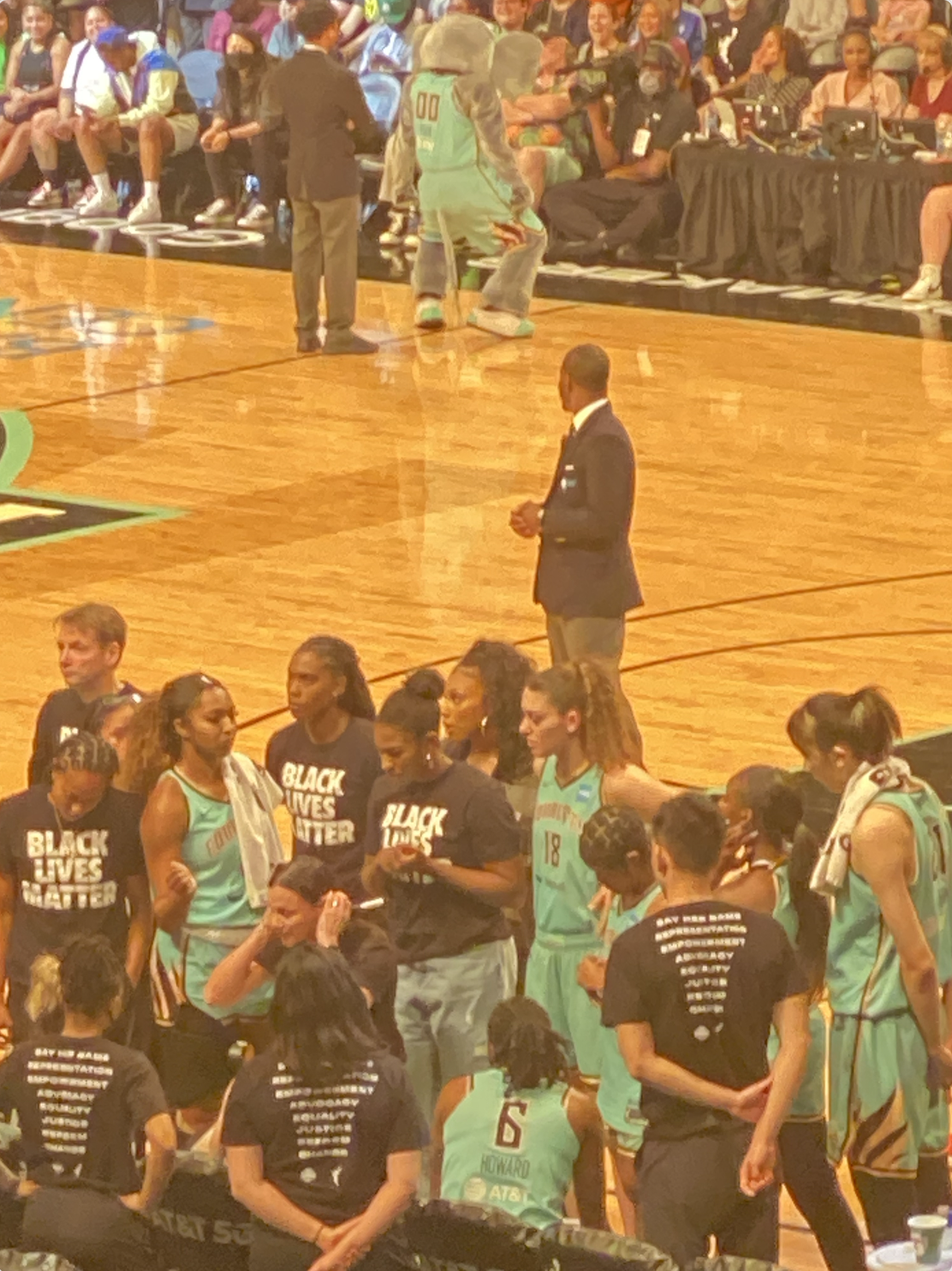
New York Liberty WNBA Team staff wore Black Lives Matter T-Shirts during a game on June 19, 2022

In 2020, The New York Times (NTY) called the WNBA "the most socially progressive pro league".

As the league's popularity has grown, players have gained more voice and power to become activists in various fields. One of the activist players' main focuses is the inequality between men's and women's sports. Many players, such as Brittney Griner, Breanna Stewart, and Maya Moore, have spoken about equality between gender, sexual orientation, and race. The players have also supported progressive social and political movements, such as Black Lives Matter (BLM) and others.

The Minnesota Lynx were early advocates. The NYT called Seimone Augustus "one of sports' most forward-thinking and undersung activists" for her early work advocating for marriage equality and LGBTQ+ rights. Before the Lynx's July 9, 2016, home game, the team held a press conference where the four co-captains wore black t-shirts with the message "Change starts with us - Justice & Accountability" on the front and the names of Philando Castile and Alton Sterling on the back. Castile had been killed by police in a traffic stop three days before the game.

In mid-2020, the WNBA and WNBPA formed a Social Justice Council, with civil rights advocates Alicia Garza and Kimberlé Crenshaw acting as external advisors. Shortly after the George Floyd protests began, the league and union decided in 2020 to put BLM and Say Her Name slogans on warmup gear and opening weekend uniforms. When Atlanta Dream team owner Senator Kelly Loeffler criticized the league's support for BLM, her team wore black T-shirts with the slogan "VOTE WARNOCK", endorsing her election opponent Raphael Warnock, an African-American pastor who defeated Loeffler.

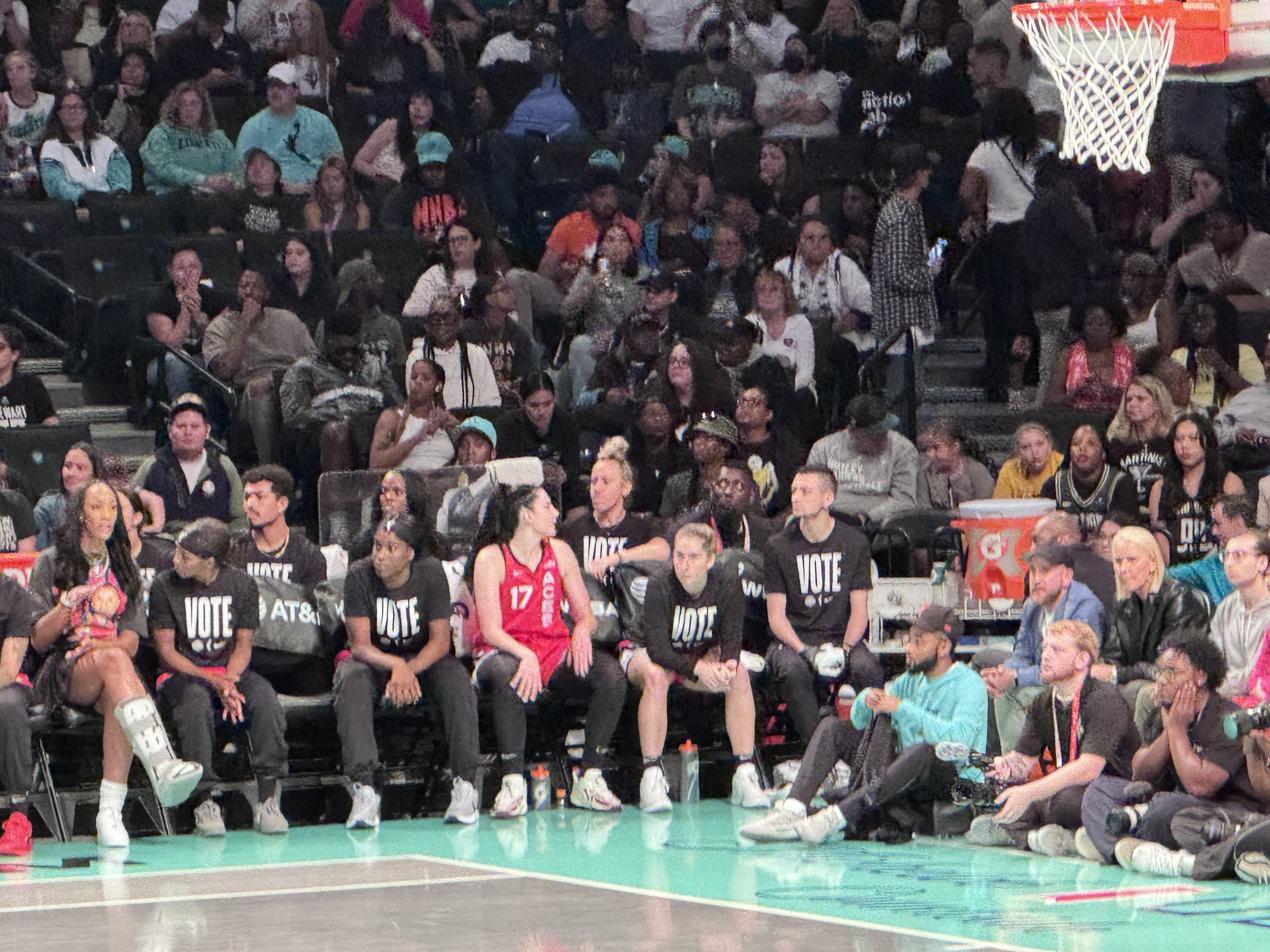
In September 2024, players from the Las Vegas Aces wore T-shirts that read VOTE.

In 2021, during the COVID-19 pandemic, the WNBA led American professional sports teams in promoting the COVID-19 vaccine. Teams hosted vaccine clinics in their home arenas. In April, the league and union's Social Justice Council made a PSA, Our Health is Worth a Shot, that aired during the WNBA draft. In June 2021, the WNBA announced that 99% of its players had been fully vaccinated.

In June 2024, the documentary film Power of the Dream was released. The film focuses on the league's work to support Black Lives Matter and the organizing to support the election of Warnock. Sue Bird and Nneka Ogwumike are co-producers of the film, along with Tracee Ellis Ross and the director Dawn Porter.

=== Sponsorships ===
On June 1, 2009, the Phoenix Mercury was the first team in WNBA history to announce a marquee sponsorship. The team secured a partnership with LifeLock to brand their jerseys and warm-ups. It was the first branded jersey in WNBA history. After the LifeLock deal expired, the Mercury secured a new uniform sponsorship deal with Casino Arizona and Talking Stick Resort on February 3, 2014.

Other teams eventually followed in the Mercury's footsteps; some teams feature sponsors prominently on the front of their jerseys, while others have sponsors on the upper left-hand shoulder.

On August 22, 2011, the WNBA announced a league-wide marquee sponsorship with Boost Mobile. The deal would allow the Boost Mobile logo to be placed on 11 of the 12 teams' jerseys (excluding San Antonio) in addition to branding on the courts and in arenas. A source said the deal was a "multiyear, eight-figure deal".

Before the start of the 2011 season, every team announced a new look for their uniforms. The supplier of the uniforms for the league, Adidas, upgraded all teams to new high-tech designs, much like they did for the NBA before the start of their season.

On April 8, 2019, the WNBA announced a multiyear marquee partnership with AT&T, making them the first non-apparel partner to have its logo featured on the front of all 12 team jerseys. The jerseys officially debuted during the 2019 WNBA draft.

In 2020, the league launched WNBA Changemakers, a collective of businesses committed to the advancement of women in sports. Business partners of the collective provide direct financial investment to the WNBA as well as marketing amplification through collaborations.

=== Salaries, rosters, and collective bargaining ===
Before the 2009 season, the maximum team roster size was changed from 13 players (11 active and 2 inactive) to 11 players (all active). Any team that falls below nine players able to play due to injury or any other factor outside of the control of the team will, upon request, be granted a roster hardship exception allowing the team to sign an additional player or players so the team will have nine players able to play in an upcoming game or games. As soon as the injured (or otherwise sidelined) player(s) can play, the roster hardship player(s)—not any other player on the roster—must be waived. In March 2014, the WNBA and players signed a new, eight-year collective bargaining agreement, increasing the number of players on a roster to 12.

The WNBA draft is held annually every spring. The minimum age is 22 years for American players and 20 years for international players, measured as of December 31 of the calendar year of the draft. For draft purposes, "American" includes those born in the U.S., as well as those who have enrolled in a U.S. college or university, regardless of citizenship. The draft is three rounds long, with each of the 12 teams in the league (trades aside) getting three picks each. The draft order for the eight teams that made the playoffs the previous year are based on team records, and the team with the highest previous record pick last. For the remaining top four picks, a selection process similar to the NBA draft lottery is conducted for the four teams that did not qualify for the playoffs.

Previously, in 2008, a new six-year collective bargaining agreement was agreed upon between the players and the league. The salary cap for an entire team in 2010 was $827,000 (although it was later lowered to $775,000). By 2013 (the sixth year under this agreement), the cap for an entire team was $900,000. In 2010, the minimum salary for a player with three-plus years of experience was $51,000 while the maximum salary for a six-plus year player was $101,500 (the first time in league history that players can receive over $100,000). The minimum salary for rookies was $35,190. Many WNBA players supplement their salaries by playing in European, Australian, or Chinese women's basketball leagues during the WNBA offseason. The WNBA pays its female players less than their NBA counterparts, although this is attributed to the much greater revenues of the NBA; however the WNBA has been criticized for "paying its players a lower share of revenue than the NBA".

The decision of superstar Diana Taurasi to sit out the 2015 WNBA season was seen by some in the media as a harbinger of salary-related troubles in the future. The Russian club for which she was playing at the time, UMMC Ekaterinburg, offered her a bonus well over the league's maximum player salary to sit out that season. Taurasi accepted, largely because she had not had an offseason since playing college basketball more than a decade earlier. Such offers have often been made to star American players, including Taurasi herself, but none were accepted until Taurasi did so in 2015.

Another incident that led to widespread media comment on the WNBA's salary structure was the torn Achilles suffered by reigning WNBA MVP Breanna Stewart while playing for another Russian side, Dynamo Kursk, in the 2019 EuroLeague Women final. The injury came at a time when the WNBA and its players' union were preparing to negotiate a new collective bargaining agreement, following the union's announcement in November 2018 that it would opt out of the current CBA after the 2019 season. With overseas leagues offering higher salaries than the WNBA, roughly 70% of the league's players go overseas in any given season. While these players do not necessarily play as many games as NBA players do in their seasons, even participants in the NBA Finals get several months of rest in the offseason, something not available for WNBA players who also play overseas. In a story on the ramifications of Stewart's injury, Michael Voepel of ESPN had this to say about the lead-in to the injury:

For Stewart, her 2018 went like this: playing in China, brief time off, WNBA season, World Cup in the Canary Islands, brief time off, playing in Russia. She hasn't had significant recovery time since before her senior season at UConn. Now, she'll have time away from playing but while going through rehab and physical therapy.

The CBA that took effect in 2020 significantly increased minimum and maximum salaries. The minimum league salary in 2020 was $57,000 for players with less than three years of experience, and $68,000 otherwise. For most players, the 2020 maximum salary was $185,000; players who met specified criteria for league service had a maximum of $215,000. In 2026, a new seven-year deal was announced, in which the maximum salary per player became $1.4M and the minimum salary became $270,000–$300,000, depending on tenure.

WNBA players are awarded bonuses for certain achievements. Some of the bonuses given by the league (amount is per player), from 2020 to 2027 (the duration of the current CBA): WNBA champion: $11,356; Runner-up: $5,678; Most Valuable Player: $15,450; All-WNBA First Team member: $10,300; and All-Star Game participant: $2,575. These were only modest increases from amounts provided before 2020.

The lack of roster space for rookies, thus hampering their professional development, became a major issue. While the 2020 CBA led to maximum player salaries nearly doubling from 2019 to 2022, the team cap only increased by slightly less than 40% in that period. Because it is a hard cap, many WNBA teams carry only 11 players on their rosters instead of the maximum 12, leading Stewart to state "We're at a tipping point ... without some easy tweaks, we are no longer a league that has 12 teams and 144 players—it's more like 133." The WNBA also has no developmental league similar to the NBA G League; Chiney Ogwumike, a vice president of the players' union, publicly called for such a league. While roster limits have always been a significant issue in the league—between the first WNBA draft in 1997 and 2021, more than 40% of drafted players never made a roster—this became especially apparent in the 2020s. For example, the 2019 Naismith Trophy winner Megan Gustafson did not make an opening-day roster in 2019, and had only played in parts of the 2019–2021 seasons before being cut in the 2022 preseason. This issue gained major publicity before the start of the 2022 season. The Minnesota Lynx, which began that week with barely over $12,000 of cap room, cut six players, including the 2020 Rookie of the Year Crystal Dangerfield, their 2021 first-round pick Rennia Davis, and both of their 2022 draft picks. The Seattle Storm, whose first 2022 draft pick was in the middle of the second round, waived that pick (Elissa Cunane), and the Las Vegas Aces waived both of their picks, one of them a first-rounder.

Another clause in the 2020 CBA, known as the "prioritization" clause, has been viewed as a potential problem for the league. Due to overseas league commitments, a significant number of WNBA players have reported late to training camp each season. Several overseas leagues and continental club competitions overlap with WNBA training camps, and even with the start of the WNBA season. For example, 55 WNBA players missed the start of training camp in 2021, meaning most teams were unable to start practice with their full rosters. Starting in 2023, teams are required to fine players with more than two years of WNBA experience who miss the start of training camp. (Exemptions are provided for national team commitments, graduations, and other significant life events.) Starting in 2024, the league can penalize a veteran player who does not report to camp with a season-long suspension without pay. In a 2021 episode of a podcast hosted by Napheesa Collier and A'ja Wilson, Collier raised the prospect of players choosing to abandon the WNBA for higher overseas salaries, telling Wilson "If I'm not making that much in the league, if it's not enough for me to survive on during the year, I'm going overseas and having the summer off." When Stewart re-signed with the Seattle Storm as a free agent before the 2022 season, she cited the prioritization clause as the reason she only signed a one-year contract.

==== Player revenue ====
Many factors play into the smaller wages WNBA players receive during their season, but two major contributors are revenue and viewership numbers and the allocation of funds by both the NBA and the WNBA. It is estimated that wages for NBA players take up 50% of the league's annual revenue, while WNBA players only receive 20% of their league's income. Kelsey Plum said in an interview with The Residency Podcast, "We're not asking to get paid what the men get paid. We're asking to get paid the same percentage of revenue shared."

==== Player marketing agreements ====
Player marketing agreements (PMAs), introduced in the 2021–22 offseason, are league contracts that pay select WNBA players for year‑round marketing and promotional work on behalf of the league. The league was expected to spend about $1M annually on PMAs, with funds divided among participating players and individual contracts capped at $250,000. PMAs provide additional offseason income and are also intended to encourage players to remain stateside. Players have cited varied reasons for signing PMAs, including the need to rest or rehabilitate injuries and childcare responsibilities. However, most top WNBA players have opted not to sign PMAs, citing concerns that the agreements limit other name, image, and likeness opportunities.

==== NBA support ====
The WNBA is half-owned by the NBA and receives $10–$15M annually to subsidize the league from the NBA's yearly revenue, which in 2022, reached up to $10 billion. Six WNBA teams are considered sister teams to the NBA teams based in the same areas and are directly connected to those NBA teams and their markets. The NBA's allotment of funding to all WNBA teams, not just sister teams, has been discussed in many academic and sports analysis circles, with some authors arguing that the NBA should be doing more to support the WNBA. Sponsorship and TV deals continue to be an area where the WNBA creates less revenue than their NBA counterparts, with the WNBA bringing in $25M from ESPN and the NBA bringing in $930M from ESPN and TNT. Some argue that the NBA could be working harder to bridge that gap between organizations and either share more revenue from deals or help the WNBA create their own more profitable agreements.

In July 2024, the WNBA negotiated a new media rights deal as part of a total package with the NBA valued at $77 billion. Prior to re-negotiating their deal, the WNBA media rights were only valued at $60M a year. Under the new deal, the WNBA can expect to earn $200M a year for the next 11 years, more than a 300% increase over previous years, but because the media deal lumps the NBA together with the WNBA, the true valuation of the WNBA media rights remains unknown.

=== Merchandise ===
==== 2021 ====
The following shows the top merchandise sales during the 2021 season, based on sales through the WNBA's official online store. However, a story by NBC Sports journalist Alex Azzi argued that the WNBA's merchandise rankings were misleading for multiple reasons.

- At any given time, the WNBA has at most 144 players, but at the time of the story, "ready to ship" replica team jerseys were available for fewer than 20 of them. Many of the league's top players in the 2021 season were not among those with "ready to ship" jerseys. The only such jersey available for Jonquel Jones, who would be named league MVP shortly after the story ran, was a replica of the jersey she wore in that season's All-Star Game, and not her Connecticut Sun jersey. The league's leading scorer that season, Tina Charles, had no ready-made jersey available. Also, not all of the ready-made jerseys were available in youth sizes. All other player replica jerseys must be custom-ordered, which take longer to ship, cost more, and are only available in adult sizes. The only Minnesota Lynx player with a ready-made jersey, Maya Moore, had not played in the league since 2018 (and formally announced her retirement in 2023).
- Some teams, among them the Lynx, offer a larger variety of ready-made replica jerseys in their online team stores. Also, Dick's Sporting Goods, which entered a multi-year marketing agreement with the league shortly before the story ran, has a wider availability of such jerseys than the WNBA online store. However, the league's official merchandise rankings do not include sales through any outlets other than its online store.
- While over 80% of WNBA players are black, the top three on this list, as well as four of the top five, are white. A study by two researchers at the University of Massachusetts published earlier in 2021 concluded that after controlling for points and rebounds, white players individually averaged twice as many media mentions as black players during the 2020 season. This discrepancy was called out by white UConn superstar Paige Bueckers during her acceptance speech at the 2021 ESPY Awards, and Azzi argued that it contributed to the perceived racial bias in the WNBA merchandise rankings.

Jersey Sales
Rank	1	2	3	4	5	6	7	8	9	10
Player	Sabrina Ionescu	Sue Bird	Diana Taurasi	A'ja Wilson	Breanna Stewart	Candace Parker	Skylar Diggins-Smith	Elena Delle Donne	Maya Moore	Liz Cambage
Team	Liberty	Storm	Mercury	Aces	Storm	Sky	Mercury	Mystics	Lynx	Aces

Team Sales
Rank	1	2	3	4	5
Team	Seattle Storm	New York Liberty	Las Vegas Aces	Phoenix Mercury	Chicago Sky

==== 2024 ====
The arrival of Caitlin Clark in 2024 led to unprecedented public interest in the WNBA. As such, the league's merchandise was sold in record numbers, both player-specific and league-wide, such as the orange WNBA hoodie. Clark had the most jerseys sold during the year's first half, with the rankings also featuring two other rookies: Angel Reese and Kate Martin.

Jersey Sales
Rank	1	2	3	4	5
Player	Caitlin Clark	Angel Reese	Sabrina Ionescu	Kate Martin	A'ja Wilson
Team	Fever	Sky	Liberty	Aces	Aces

Team Sales
Rank	1	2	3	4	5
Team	Indiana Fever	Chicago Sky	New York Liberty	Las Vegas Aces	Seattle Storm

==== 2025 ====
In the first half of 2025, the best-selling jerseys were as shown below.

Jersey Sales
Rank	1	2	3	4	5	6	7	8	9	10
Player	Caitlin Clark	Paige Bueckers	Kate Martin	Angel Reese	A'ja Wilson	Hailey Van Lith	Cameron Brink	Napheesa Collier	Kamilla Cardoso	Sabrina Ionescu
Team	Fever	Wings	Valkyries	Sky	Aces	Sky	Sparks	Lynx	Sky	Liberty

=== Presidents and commissioners ===
The title of the league's chief executive was "President" before Cathy Engelbert became the first "Commissioner".

- Val Ackerman, 1996–2005
- Donna Orender, 2005–2010
- Chris Granger, 2011 (interim)
- Laurel J. Richie, 2011–2015
- Lisa Borders, 2015–2018
- Mark Tatum, 2018–2019 (interim)
- Cathy Engelbert, 2019–present

== Attendance ==
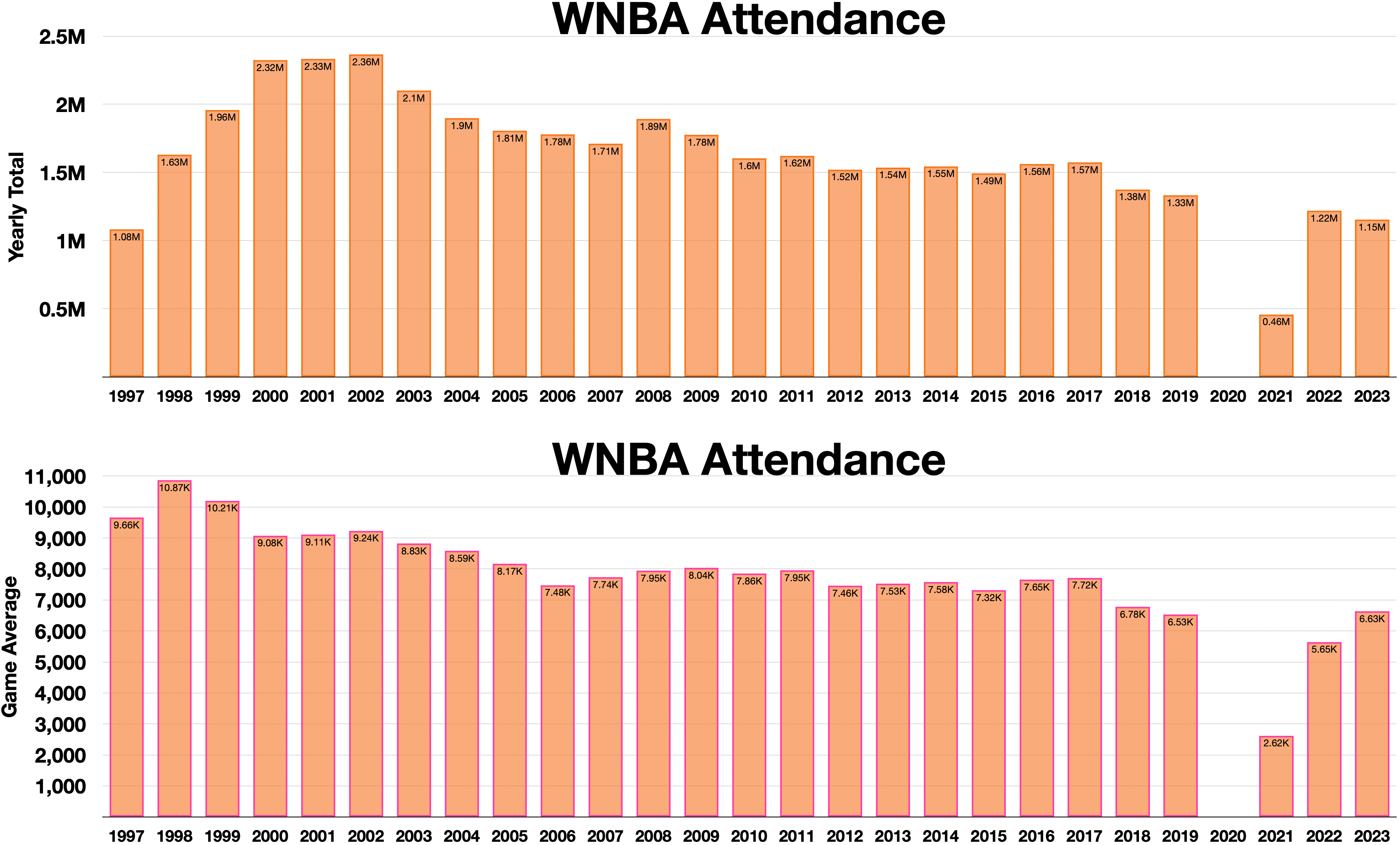
WNBA attendance 1997–2023

In the inaugural 1997 WNBA season, average attendance for the regular season was 9,661 attendants with 112 games played. Average attendance increased by 12% in 1998 over 150 games. By 2000, the regular WNBA season consisted of 256 games and attendance dropped with an average of 9,142 attendants per game from 2000 to 2003. Beginning in 2003, attendance dropped at a rate of about 5% year-over-year until 2006 when average attendance was 7,479. From 2007 to 2014, attendance numbers remained relatively steady with a low of 7,457 in 2012 and a high of 8,039 in 2009.

In 2015, the WNBA's attendance per game decreased by 3.4% to 7,318. This was a record low for the WNBA since it was established in 1997. The relocation of the San Antonio Stars to Freeman Coliseum and the Tulsa Shock to Arlington likely contributed to large drops in attendance in 2015 (−37.4% and −7.2% respectively). With record low attendance, the WNBA sought to improve their branding effort for the following 20th anniversary season and the WNBA President, Laurel J. Richie, discussed creating an expansion committee to evaluate if and how the WNBA should go about expanding.

Attendance in 2016 and 2017 recovered slightly with average attendance at 7,655 and 7,716 respectively, but the 2018 and 2019 seasons each set the lowest average attendance in WNBA history (6,769 and 6,535 respectively). However, about half of the decline in attendance from 2017 to 2018 was due to the New York Liberty moving from 19,812-seat Madison Square Garden to the 5,000-seat Westchester County Center. While the Liberty had averaged over 9,000 fans in 2017, James Dolan, then the team's owner, noted that roughly half of the team's attendance in that season came from complimentary tickets. Similarly in 2019, the Washington Mystics moved from the 20,356-seat Capital One Arena to the 4,111-seat Entertainment and Sports Arena. The Las Vegas Aces and New York Liberty each saw double-digit percentage losses in 2019, but half of the league's teams saw attendance increases that season, and the number of sellouts was the same in both seasons (41).

With plans to expand the number of regular season games played by each team from 34 to 36, and with the introduction of the mid-season Commissioner's Cup tournament to be broadcast on ESPN and ABC, the league had high hopes for the 2020 WNBA season. This was derailed when the season was postponed due to the COVID-19 pandemic on April 3. Instead, the league held an abbreviated 22-game regular season at IMG Academy in Bradenton, Florida, with no fans in attendance. The 2021 WNBA season was also shortened to a 32-game regular season and attendance numbers remained low with an average of 2,620 people in attendance per game, likely due to persistent fears around the COVID-19 virus and new safety protocols for large indoor venues. By 2022, average attendance rebounded to 5,646 and in 2023 attendance recovered to pre-pandemic numbers with 6,615 average attendance per game.

2024 was a breakout season for WNBA attendance, with an average of 9,807 fans per game—an increase of 48% over the 2023 season. Three games drew more than 20,000 fans, including a record-breaking attendance of 20,711 fans when the Indiana Fever visited the Washington Mystics on September 19. A surge in interest in women's college basketball preceded the 2024 WNBA season, with viewership of the 2024 women's NCAA championship game up over 90% from the previous season, marking the first time in NCAA history where viewership for the women's championship game exceeded the men's. Sports analysts cited intense interest in the incoming 2024 rookie class, led by number one draft pick Caitlin Clark, as the reason for the dramatic increases in attendance, dubbing her ability to drive ticket sales "Clarkonomics".

Attendance
1990s

Year	Team												League	
Year	CHA	CLE	DET	HOU	LA	MIN	NY	ORL	PHX	SAC	UTA	WAS	Regular season	Postseason
1997	8,307	7,971		9,814	8,937		13,270		13,703	7,858	7,611		9,684	14,849
1998	8,561	10,350	10,229	12,602	7,653		14,935		13,764	6,578	8,104	15,910	10,869	11,964
1999	7,080	9,350	8,485	11,906	7,625	10,494	14,047	9,801	12,219	8,626	7,544	15,306	10,207	12,647

2000s

Year	Team																				League	
Year	ATL	CHA	CHI	CLE	CON	DET	HOU	IND	LA	MIA	MIN	NY	ORL	PHX	POR	SAC	SA	SEA	UTA	WAS	Regular season	Postseason
2000		5,685		8,596		6,716	12,255	12,267	6,563	7,983	7,290	14,498	7,363	10,130	8,317	7,928		8,912	6,420	15,258	9,074	12,222
2001		6,595		9,211		6,834	11,320	8,683	9,278 (Note: LA moved from The Forum to Staples Center prior to the 2001 season.)	8,840	7,538	15,671	7,430	8,558	8,604	8,350		5,954	6,907	15,417	9,074	11,430
2002		6,667		9,318		5,686	10,866	8,434	11,651	8,828	7,819	14,670	7,115	8,737	8,041	9,011		6,989	7,420	16,202	9,228	11,537
2003		7,062		7,400	6,023	7,862	8,835 (Note: HOU moved from Compaq Center to Toyota Center prior to the 2003 season.)	8,340	9,290		7,074	12,123		8,501		9,125	10,384	7,109		14,042	8,800	9,205
2004		6,846			6,707	9,462	8,086	7,588	10,428		7,359	9,886 (Note: NY played six games at Radio City Music Hall in 2004.)		8,017		8,679	8,395	7,899		12,615	8,613	9,490
2005		5,768			7,173	9,374	7,099	8,382	8,854		6,673	10,140		7,303		8,542	7,944	8,891		10,088	8,172	8,397
2006		5,941	3,390		7,417	9,380	7,682	7,222	8,311		6,442	9,120		7,459		8,691	7,397	8,568		7,839	7,490	8,397
2007			3,915		7,970	9,749	8,166	7,032	8,695		7,119	8,698		7,737		8,387	7,569	7,974		7,788	7,819	10,312
2008	8,316		3,656		7,644	9,569	6,585 (Note: HOU moved from Toyota Center to Reliant Arena prior to the 2008 season.)	7,702	9,508		6,968	9,045		8,522		8,180	7,984	8,265		9,096	7,948	8,420
2009	7,102		3,932		6,794	8,004		7,939	10,387		7,537	9,800		8,523		7,744	7,527	7,874		11,338	8,039	9,979

2010s

Year	Team														League	
Year	ATL	CHI	CON	DAL	IND	LA	LV	MIN	NY	PHX	SA	SEA	TUL	WAS	Regular season	Postseason
2010	6,293	4,293 (Note: CHI moved from UIC Pavilion to Allstate Arena prior to the 2010 season.)	7,486	—	8,265	9,468	—	7,622	11,069	8,982	8,041	8,322	4,812	9,357	7,834	10,822
2011	6,487	5,536	7,056	—	8,054	10,316	—	8,447	7,702 (Note: NY moved temporarily from Madison Square Garden to Prudential Center from 2011 through 2013)	9,167	8,751	8,659	4,828	10,449	7,954	9,232
2012	5,453	5,573	7,266	—	7,582	10,089	—	9,683	6,779	7,814	7,850	7,486	5,203	8,639	7,452	9,195
2013	5,853	6,601	6,548	—	8,164	9,869	—	9,381	7,189	8,557	7,914	6,981	5,474	7,838	7,531	7,574
2014	5,864	6,685	5,980	—	7,900	8,288	—	9,333	8,949	9,557	7,719	6,717	5,566	8,377	7,578	8,200
2015	6,122	6,894	5,557	—	7,485	9,065	—	9,364	9,159	9,946	4,831 (Note: SA moved temporarily from AT&T Center to Freeman Coliseum for the 2015 season.)	6,516	5,167	7,714	7,318	8,799
2016	5,614	7,009	5,837	5,298	8,575	9,638	—	9,266	9,724	10,351	6,385	7,230	—	6,929	7,655	8,719
2017	4,452 (Note: ATL moved temporarily from Philips Arena, now known as State Farm Arena, to McCamish Pavilion for the 2017 and 2018 seasons.)	6,583 (Note: CHI moved from Allstate Arena to Wintrust Arena prior to the 2018 season.)	6,728	3,872	7,538	11,350	—	10,407	9,989	9,913	6,386	7,704	—	7,771	7,716	9,590
2018	4,194	6,358	6,569	4,752	6,311	10,642	5,307	10,036	2,823 (Note: NY moved to Westchester County Center prior to the 2018 season with Madison Square Garden as an alternate home.)	9,950	—	8,109	—	6,136	6,769	7,791
2019	4,270 (Note: ATL returned to State Farm Arena for one season.)	6,835	6,841	4,999	5,887	11,307	4,669 (Note: LV played one game at T-Mobile Arena.)	9,069	2,239 (Note: NY played one game at the Barclays Center.)	10,193	—	7,562 (Note: SEA moved temporarily from Climate Pledge Arena to Alaska Airlines Arena and Angel of the Winds Arena for at least the 2019 season.)	—	4,546 (Note: WAS moved from Capital One Arena to St. Elizabeths East Entertainment and Sports Arena prior to the 2019 season. Played one game at Capital One.)	6,535	6,082

2020s

Year	Team															League	
Year	ATL	CHI	CON	DAL	GSV	IND	LA	LV	MIN	NY	PHX	POR	SEA	TOR	WAS	Regular season	Postseason
2020	Due to the COVID-19 pandemic, the season was played in Bradenton, Florida without fans.																
2021	1,347	3,187	2,931	2,101	—	—	3,127	1,144	2,696	1,757	5,849	—	2,607	—	2,113		
2022	2,572	7,180	5,712	3,788	—	1,776	5,653	5,607	7,444	5,327	7,974	—	10,632	—	3,983		
2023	3,006	7,242	6,244	4,641	—	4,067	6,554	9,551	7,777	7,777	9,197	—	8,929	—	4,391		
2024	4,744	8,757	8,451	5,911	—	17,036	11,045	11,283	9,292	12,730	10,715	—	11,184	—	6,542		
2025	4,480	9,073	8,653	7,273	18,064	16,560	12,441	11,553	9,958	16,323	11,306	—	11,835	—	5,303		
2026	6,928	8,237	8,762	7,658	18,064	16,426	11,206	12,919	12,351	16,543	11,128	14,469	12,142	10,828	4,454		

== Media coverage ==
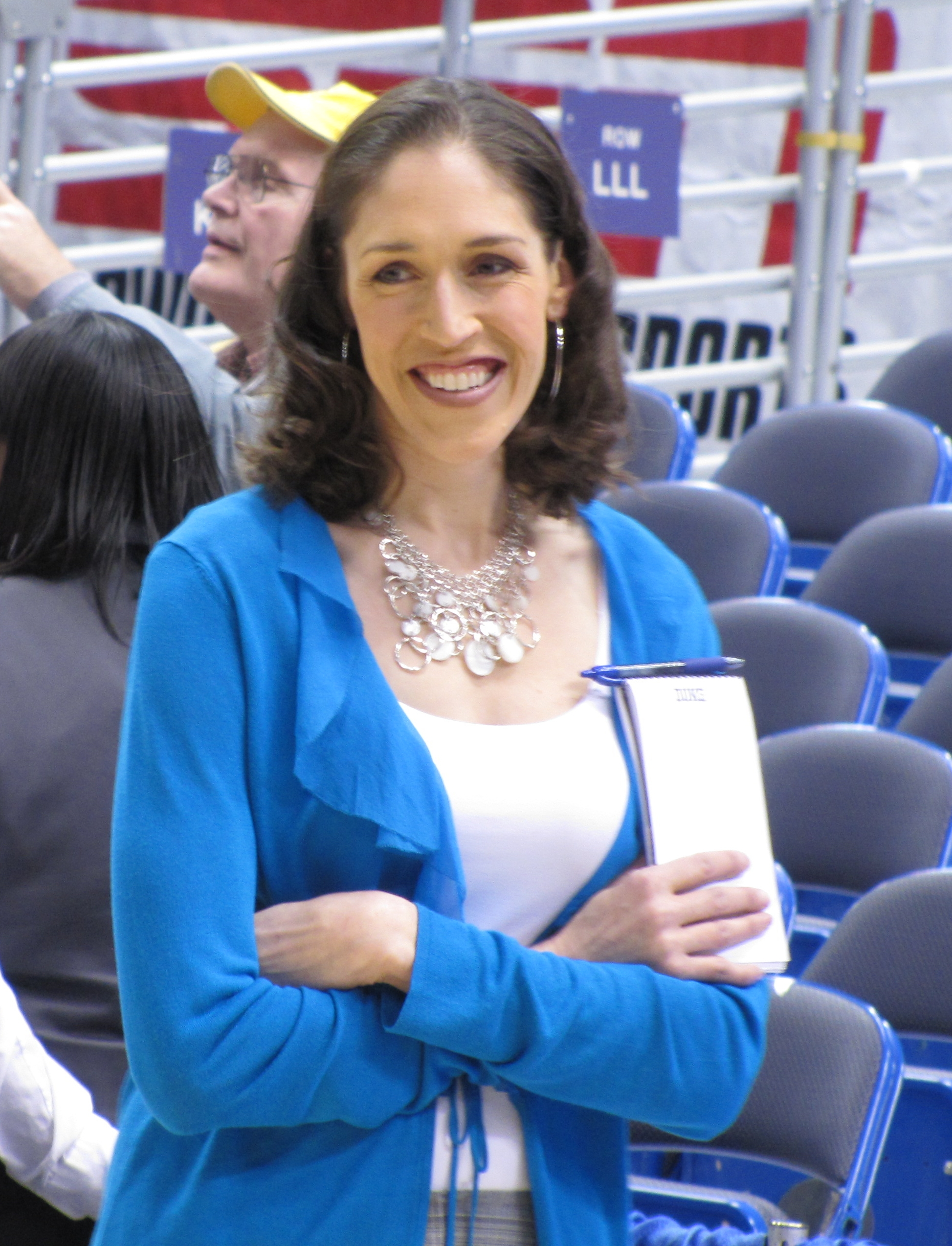
Rebecca Lobo, a former WNBA player, transitioned into a broadcasting career, providing analysis and commentary on WNBA games.

Currently, WNBA games are televised throughout the U.S. by ABC, ESPN, ESPN2, and Ion Television (Ion).

In the early years, two women-oriented networks, Lifetime and Oxygen, also broadcast games, including the first game of the WNBA. NBC showed games from 1997 to 2002 as part of their NBA on NBC coverage before the league transferred the rights to ABC/ESPN.

In June 2007, the WNBA signed a contract extension with ESPN, the first agreement to pay TV rights fees to a women's professional league. The deal ran from 2009 to 2016. A minimum of 18 games would be broadcast on ABC, ESPN, and ESPN2 each season; the rights to broadcast the first regular-season game and the All-Star game were held by ABC. Also, a minimum of 11 postseason games would be broadcast on any of the three networks. Along with this deal came the first-ever rights fees to be paid to a women's professional sports league. Over the eight years of the contract, "millions and millions of dollars" would be "dispersed to the league's teams".

In 2013, the WNBA and ESPN signed a six-year extension on the broadcast deal to cover 2017–2022. In the new deal, a total of 30 games would be shown each season on ESPN networks. Each team would receive around $1M per year.

On April 22, 2019, CBS Sports Network reached a multi-year deal to televise 40 regular-season weekend and primetime WNBA games, beginning in the 2019 season.

On April 20, 2023, Ion signed a multi-year deal with the WNBA to air a 15-week slate of doubleheader games on Friday nights (branded as WNBA Friday Night Spotlight on ION), beginning with that year's regular season. It was the first national sports broadcast carried by Ion since 2011, and marked the first ever TV contract for Scripps Sports, which was founded by the E. W. Scripps Company in December 2022 to acquire sports events for Ion and the group's local TV stations. The agreement also granted local rights to select Ion O&Os for games involving regional WNBA teams, which stations may carry in early- or late-evening broadcast windows depending on tip-off time. The first broadcast was on May 26, 2023, when the Washington Mystics visited the Chicago Sky. On June 13, 2025, the WNBA announced they had extended their agreement with Scripps Sports to continue the Friday Night Showcase package of games on Ion. On September 30, 2025, the WNBA announced it had also entered an 11-year agreement with Versant, the cable spin-off company of NBCUniversal owned by Comcast shareholders, where its games would air on USA Network.

Starting in 2026, the WNBA began a new 11-year agreement in which games returned to NBC Sports, with new airings on USA Sports, as well as remaining on ESPN/ABC and Amazon Prime Video. With this new deal, the league distributes more than 125 games nationally (a minimum of 25 across ESPN/ABC, 50 across NBC platforms, and 30 on Prime Video) and worldwide. ESPN continues as the league's All-Star and Draft broadcaster, Prime Video continues as the broadcaster for the league's Commissioner's Cup games, and NBC picked up rights to all USA Basketball games. In addition, the WNBA Playoffs and Finals will see wider distribution across the three partners, where each partner airs a first round series annually (two on ESPN/ABC and one each on NBC platforms and Prime Video), and rotates turns airing the semifinals and Finals (eight semifinals and five Finals on ESPN/ABC and seven semifinals and three Finals on NBC platforms and Prime Video). The WNBA also stated they expect to add more media partners prior to the first year of the new deal. On March 25, 2026, the WNBA announced the league had reached a new long-term agreement with CBS Sports to broadcast 20 regular season games on CBS and Paramount+.

Some teams offer games on local radio, while all teams have some games broadcast on local TV stations:

- Atlanta – WANF-TV, WPCH-TV & Peachtree Sports Network
- Chicago – WCIU-TV
- Dallas – WFAA, KFAA-TV
- Houston – KHOU/KTBU, Space City Home Network
- Indiana – WTHR, WALV
- Golden State – KPIX-TV, KPYX
- Las Vegas – KMCC
- Los Angeles – Spectrum SportsNet
- Minnesota – KARE-TV
- New York – WNYW, WWOR
- Portland – KPDX, KPTV (Rose City SportsNet)
- Phoenix – KTVK, KPHE
- Seattle – KOMO-TV, KUNS
- Washington – Monumental Sports Network

=== WNBA League Pass ===
In 2009, the WNBA announced the launch of WNBA LiveAccess, a feature on WNBA.com that provided fans access to over 200 live game webcasts throughout the WNBA season. All WNBA LiveAccess games were then archived for on-demand viewing. Most games (except broadcasts on ABC, ESPN or ESPN2, which are available on ESPN3) were available via this system. The first use of LiveAccess was the E League versus Chicago Sky preseason game.

Before the 2011 season, LiveAccess was given an overhaul, where the system became more reliable and new features were added. Before the 2012 season, it was announced that users of LiveAccess would have to pay a $4.99 subscription fee to use the service. In 2013, this was increased to $14.99. In 2014, the streaming service was renamed WNBA League Pass. In 2016, live access was expanded to allow fans to purchase single game or team pass options, as well as a full-season package.

WNBA League Pass is available as part of the WNBA App, the free mobile application available on iOS and Android devices. Games airing on ESPN, ESPN2 as well as other games taking place during the telecast windows of ESPN and ESPN2 games, are not available live on WNBA League Pass. However, those games become available on-demand shortly after the conclusion of their live broadcast.

In 2023, the Athletes Unlimited (AU) basketball league became available on League Pass. The cost for the subscription was $24.99 per year. By 2026, the subscription cost $14.99 monthly or $39.99 annually, with Amazon being the exclusive distributor of the WNBA League Pass—although it is still available through the WNBA App and website.

=== Viewership ===
Year	Season	Telecasts on ESPN/ESPN2/ ABC/CBS	Average viewership	+/− over previous
2005	Regular	Unknown	282,000	▲
2006	Regular	14	242,000	▲
2007	Regular	16	221,000	▼
2008	Regular	13	248,000	▲
2008	Playoffs	12	282,000	▼
2009	Regular	12	269,000	▲
2009	Playoffs	13	435,000	▲
2010	Regular	18	258,000	▼
2010	Playoffs	7	370,000	▼
2011	Regular	11	270,000	▲
2011	Playoffs	15	Unknown	
2012	Regular	10	180,000	▼
2012	Playoffs	19	301,000	▲
2013	Regular	13	231,000	▲
2013	Playoffs	17	344,000	▲
2014	Regular	19	240,000	▲
2014	Playoffs	10	489,000	▲
2015	Regular	11 (includes 1 on ESPN)	202,000	▼
2015	Playoffs	Unknown	Unknown	
2016	Regular	Unknown	224,000	▲
2016	Playoffs	Unknown	Unknown	
2017	Regular	Unknown	171,000	
2017	Playoffs	Unknown	346,000	
2018	Regular		231,000	
2018	Playoffs		319,000	
2019	Regular		246,000	
2019	Playoffs		258,000	
2021	Playoffs	Unknown	367,000	
2022	Regular & Playoffs	Unknown	412,000	▲
2023	Regular & Playoffs	Unknown	505,000	▲
2024	Regular	22	1,190,000	▲
2025	Regular & Playoffs	49	1,200,000	▲

== All-time franchise history (through 2026) ==
Team	Years	Attendance Avg.	W	L	PCT	Playoffs	Playoffs W	Playoffs L	Playoffs PCT	Titles
Atlanta Dream	2008–present	5,097	285	340	.456	11	18	27	.400	0
Charlotte Sting	1997–2006	6,851	143	179	.444	6	6	13	.316	0
Chicago Sky	2006–present	5,916	307	383	.445	9	20	21	.488	1
Cleveland Rockers	1997–2003	8,885	108	112	.491	4	6	9	.400	0
Connecticut Sun	2003–2026	6,709	450	342	.568	16	20	19	.513	0
Dallas Wings (total)^{1}	1998–present	6,500	402	548	.423	14	33	29	.532	3
Dallas Wings	2016–present	4,737	133	217	.380	5	22	18	.550	0
Detroit Shock	1998–2009	8,463	210	186	.530	8	30	19	.612	3
Golden State Valkyries	2025–present	18,064	23	23	.500	1	4	2	.692	1
Houston Comets (total)^{2}	1999–present	6,897	510	410	.554	17	44	44	.500	0
Indiana Fever	2000–present	8,256	407	489	.454	14	39	39	.500	1
Las Vegas Aces (total)^{3}	1997–present	7,509	494	496	.499	16	45	43	.511	3
Las Vegas Aces	2018–present	7,300	203	91	.690	7	75	32	.701	3
Los Angeles Sparks	1997–present	9,076	551	427	.563	20	46	43	.517	3
Miami Sol	2000–2002	8,556	48	48	.500	1	1	2	.333	0
Minnesota Lynx	1999–present	8,157	519	407	.560	16	53	35	.602	4
New York Liberty	1997–present	9,837	510	471	.520	20	43	48	.473	1
Orlando Miracle	1999–2002	7,927	60	68	.469	1	1	2	.333	0
Phoenix Mercury	1997–present	9,345	500	489	.506	19	52	48	.520	3
Portland Fire	2026-present	316,750	500	355	.386	0	0	0	0	0
Sacramento Monarchs	1997–2009	8,287	224	200	.527	9	24	19	.558	1
San Antonio Stars	2003–2017	7,857	204	306	.400	7	8	18	.308	0
Seattle Storm	2000–present	7,954	468	423	.525	20	36	31	.537	4
Toronto Tempo	2026-present	20,996	244	356	.250	0	0	0	0	0
Tulsa Shock	2010–2015	5,173	59	145	.289	1	0	2	.000	0
Utah Starzz	1997–2002	7,334	87	99	.468	2	2	5	.286	0
Washington Mystics	1998–present	9,296	413	537	.435	15	18	34	.346	1

- ^{1} The Dallas Wings were known as the Detroit Shock from 1998 to 2009 and the Tulsa Shock from 2010 to 2015.
- ^{2} The Houston Comets were known as the Orlando Miracle from 1999 to 2002 and the Connecticut Sun from 2003 to 2026.
- ^{3} The Las Vegas Aces were known as the Utah Starzz from 1997 to 2002, the San Antonio Silver Stars from 2003 to 2013, and the San Antonio Stars from 2014 to 2017.

== Offseason ==
In July 2023, Napheesa Collier and Breanna Stewart announced Unrivaled, a women's professional three-on-three basketball league. The league was founded, in part, to allow WNBA players to play domestically and to bypass complications from the WNBA's prioritization rule for players who choose to play overseas in the WNBA offseason. Unrivaled's inaugural season, consisting of six teams of six players, debuted in January 2025 in the Miami-area community of Medley, Florida.

== See also ==
- Best WNBA Player ESPY Award
- List of Australian WNBA players
- List of current WNBA broadcasters
- List of foreign WNBA players
- List of WNBA Finals broadcasters
- List of WNBA career scoring leaders
- List of WNBA first overall draft choices
- List of WNBA head coaches
- List of WNBA players
- List of WNBA seasons
- List of WNBA regular season records
- Prominent women's sports leagues in the United States and Canada
- Professional sports leagues in the United States
- Timeline of women's basketball
- Women's sports in the United States
