= List of Delta Chi members =

The following list of Delta Chi members includes notable initiated and honorary members of the Delta Chi fraternity.

== Business ==
- Mel Fisher, Purdue, 1945 – treasure hunter
- Samuel Ginn, Auburn, 1959 – Chairman and CEO of Vodafone AirTouch, PLC
- Seth Klarman, Cornell University, 1979 – Billionaire investor, hedge fund manager, author, chief executive and portfolio manager of the Baupost Group.
- Paul Waterman, Michigan State, 1987 – CEO of BP Lubricants Castrol
- Reinhold Schmieding, Michigan State University, 1977 – Billionaire businessman and the founder and CEO of Arthrex.

== Education and academia ==
- Carey Cavanaugh, Florida, 1976 – Director of Patterson School of Diplomacy and International Commerce at the University of Kentucky

== Entertainment ==
- Alan Horn, Union, 1965 – president and chief operating officer of Warner Brothers Studios, former president and COO of 20th Century Fox
- Alex Albrecht, American, 1998 – actor and podcaster
- Kevin Costner, Cal State Fullerton, 1974 – actor, director, and producer
- Brad Ellis, Berkeley, 1992 – composer and singer; All-American offensive lineman
- Kirk Fogg, Fullerton, 1981 – host of Nickelodeon show Legends of the Hidden Temple
- Chuck Goudie, Michigan State, 1977 – investigative reporter, ABC Chicago
- Tom Graeff, UCLA, 1952 – film writer, director and editor; known for Teenagers from Outer Space
- Ashton Kutcher, Iowa, 2000 – actor
- David Moretti, Southern California, 2002 – actor, The Lair
- Bill Pidto, Cornell, 1987 – ESPN sportscaster
- G. D. Spradlin, Oklahoma, 1941 – actor
- Peter van Steeden, NYU, 1925 – musical conductor
- Adam Levine, Colorado ’88 - Lead Singer of Maroon 5

== Law ==
- Edward R. O'Malley, Cornell, 1891 – New York State Attorney General; New York Supreme Court Justice
- Robert Smith Vance, Alabama, 1950 – Eleventh Circuit Court of Appeals Judge from Alabama
- James Herbert Wilkerson, DePauw, 1899 – US District Court Judge

== Literature and journalism ==
- Jarrett Bellini, American, 2001 – writer and humorist for CNN.com
- Herb Klein, Southern California, 1945 – newspaper editor; former Press Secretary to President Nixon
- Russel B. Nye, Wisconsin, 1935 – Pulitzer Prize-winning author
- Richard Peck, Depauw, 1956 – Newbery Medal-winning author of children's books
- Robert Newton Peck, Rollins, 1953 – writer of children's books, including the Soup series
- James B. Stewart, Depauw, 1973 – author of Bloodsport

== Politics ==
- Jim Banks, Indiana, 2001 – former Indiana State Senator and current Congressman
- Otis R. Bowen, Indiana, 1939 – former Governor of Indiana and Secretary of Health and Human Services
- John Bricker, Ohio State, 1916 – past Governor and US Senator from Ohio
- William Jennings Bryan, Georgetown – US Congressman; US Secretary of State; US presidential candidate
- Doyle Carlton, Chicago, 1912 – 25th Governor of Florida
- Carey Cavanaugh, Florida, 1976 – former US Ambassador and peace negotiator
- George N. Craig, Arizona, 1932 – former Governor of Indiana
- Larry Craig, Idaho, 1976 – former US Senator from Idaho
- Robert Garcia, Long Beach State, 1999 – former Mayor of the City of Long Beach and current Congressman
- Ronald 'Bo' Ginn, Georgia Southern, 1978 – former US Representative from Georgia
- Benjamin Harrison, Miami University – 23rd President of the United States
- Henry "Scoop" Jackson, Washington, 1934 – late Senator from Washington and presidential candidate
- Sam Johnson, SMU, 1951 – US House of Representatives
- Dan Mica, Florida, 2012 – United States House of Representatives
- John L. Mica, Florida, 1967 – US House of Representatives, Florida
- Dan Miller, Florida, 1964 – former US Representative, Florida
- Matthew Neely, West Virginia, 1904 – former governor of West Virginia, 1941–1945
- Reince Priebus, University of Wisconsin–Whitewater – former chairman of the Republican National Committee
- William S. Sessions, Kansas, 1951 – former director of the FBI
- Richard Shelby, Alabama, 1967 – US Senator, Alabama
- Bob Stump, Arizona State, 1951 – former US Representative, Arizona
- Craig Thomas, Wyoming, 1992 – late US Senator, Wyoming
- George Wallace, Alabama, 1965 – former Governor of Alabama, U.S. presidential candidate
- James Henry "Jim" Webb Jr., Southern California, 1967 – US Senator, Virginia; former Secretary of the Navy
- Bill Zeliff, Connecticut, 1959 – former US Representative from New Hampshire

== Science and medicine ==
- Henry Hartsfield, Auburn, 1974 – space shuttle commander
- George Tiller, Kansas, 1964 – physician and director of a women's health care services clinic in Wichita who performed late-term abortions; murdered on May 31, 2009

== Sports ==
- Jon Daniels, Cornell, 1999 – General Manager for the Texas Rangers; youngest GM in MLB history
- Tommy Deckard, Indiana, 1938 – member of the 1936 Olympic team; former world record holder in steeplechase
- Rod Dedeaux, Southern California, 1935 – former USC coach and college baseball's "Coach of the Century"
- Jack Del Rio, Southern California, 1985 – former head coach of the Oakland Raiders and Jacksonville Jaguars
- Mark Dominik, Kansas, 1993 – former general manager of the Tampa Bay Buccaneers
- Norberto Davidds-Garrido, Southern California, 1996 - former NFL lineman
- Pat Gillick, Southern California, 1958 – baseball executive; member of the 2011 Major League Baseball Hall of Fame class
- Nolan Harrison, Indiana, 1990 – former NFL lineman
- Lawrence Herkimer, Southern Methodist, 1948 – former cheerleader and cheerleading coach
- Larry Himes, Southern California, 1964 – former general manager for the Chicago Cubs
- Michael Huyghue, Cornell, 1984 – sports lawyer and businessman
- Don Lash, Indiana University, 1937 – winner of the 1938 James E. Sullivan Award as the outstanding amateur athlete in the US
- Ron Mix, Southern California, 1960 – NFL Hall of Fame member
- A.J. Preller, Cornell, 1999 – General Manager for the San Diego Padres
- Sean Salisbury, Southern California, 1985 – former NFL quarterback and former ESPN analyst
- Frank Sommer, Pennsylvania, 1910 – former Head Football Coach of Michigan State
- Scott Studwell, Illinois, 1976 – former star Illinois linebacker, two-time Minnesota Viking Pro Bowler
- Don Thorp, Illinois, 1985 – former Illinois defensive tackle who saw NFL play briefly for three years
- Rick Welts, Washington, 1975 – current president and chief operating officer for the Golden State Warriors
