= Clark–Reese rivalry =

Basketball rivalry between Caitlin Clark and Angel Reese

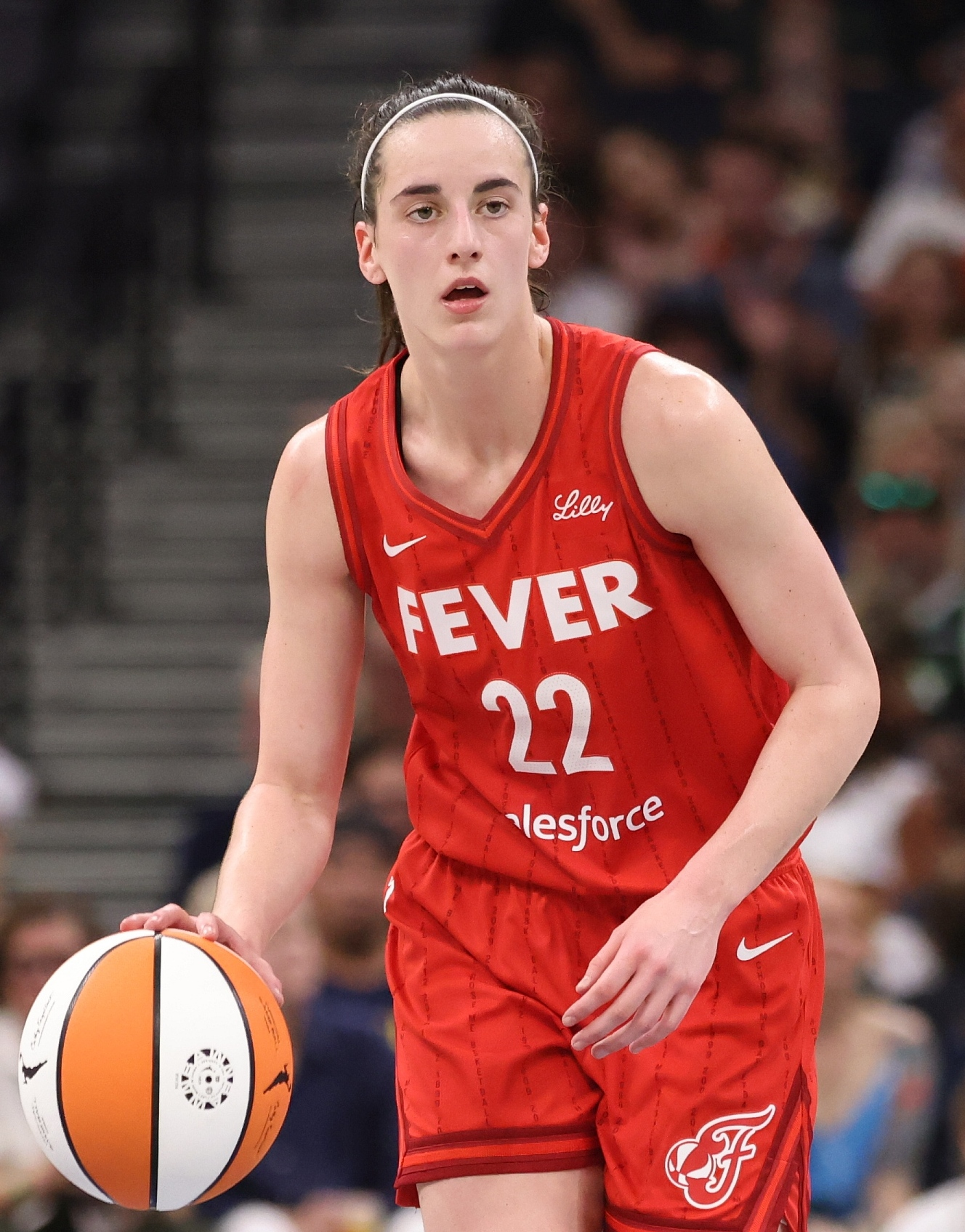
Caitlin Clark

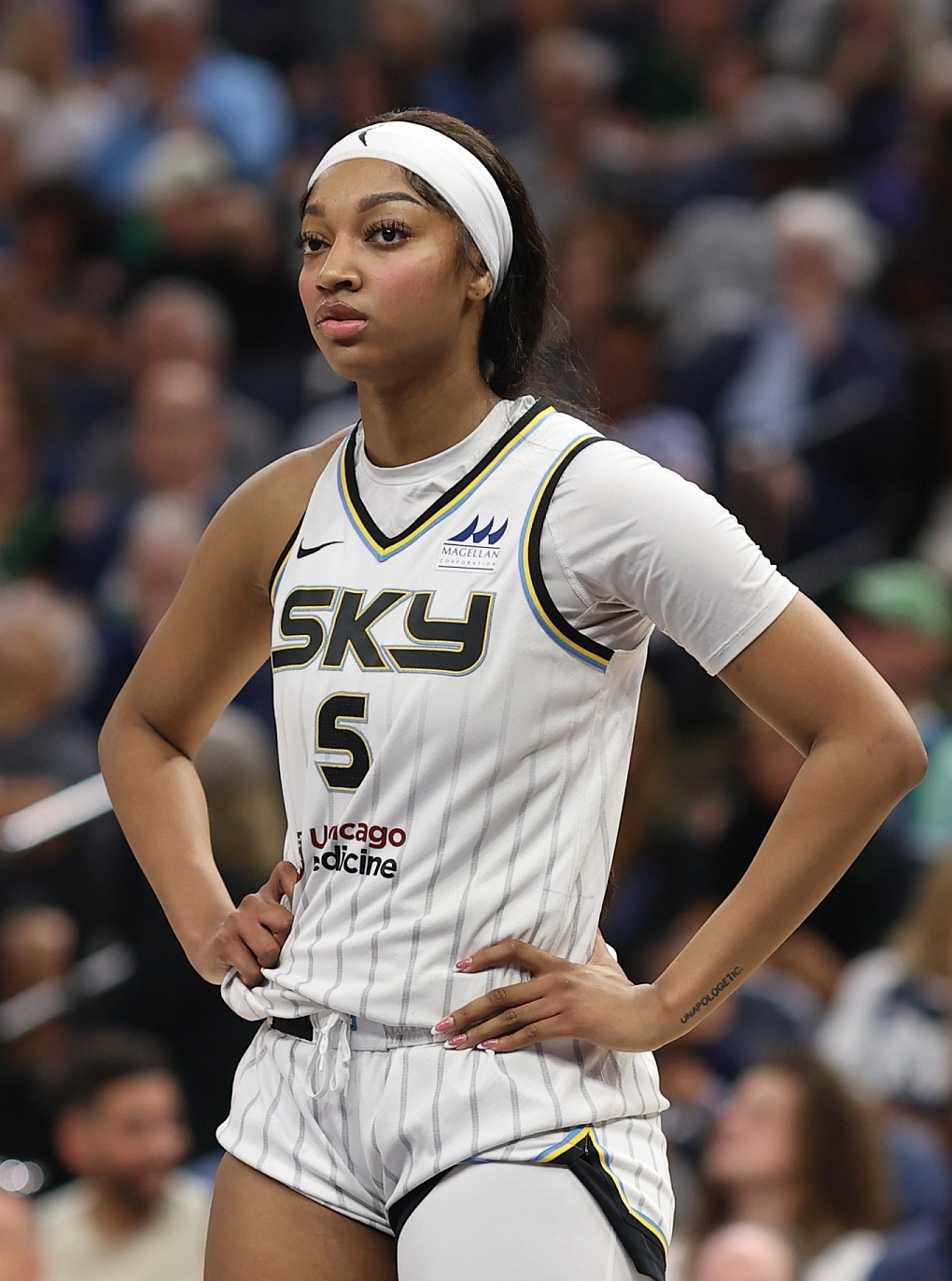
Angel Reese

The Clark–Reese rivalry or Reese–Clark rivalry is a media-based rivalry between basketball players Caitlin Clark and Angel Reese, which, for pundits and fans, began in the 2023 NCAA championship game in which Reese made a taunting gesture to Clark. In that game, Reese (15 points, 10 rebounds) with the LSU Tigers defeated Clark (30 points, 2 rebounds) with the Iowa Hawkeyes. The 2024 NCAA championship tournament solidified the rivalry in a record-setting rematch where Clark (41 points, 12 assists) and Iowa defeated Reese (17 points, 20 rebounds) and LSU. Publications have credited the rivalry for the significant increase in the public interest for women's basketball, both in college and in the Women's National Basketball Association (WNBA), while its ostensible racial undertones have also been widely discussed in the media.

== History ==
=== Background ===
Clark and Reese first met on the court on the Amateur Athletic Union (U16) circuit, playing for All Iowa Attack and Team Takeover, respectively. Reese was considered the number two player in her high school class by ESPN, while Clark was ranked number four in the same class. In 2019, Reese (18 points, 11 rebounds) led Team Takeover in the Nike EYBL (U17) championship in a 57–47 win over defending champions All Iowa Attack, and Clark (22 points, 7 assists), in the final.

=== College basketball ===
They first played against each other collegiately during Big Ten play in their first two college seasons, with Reese at Maryland and Clark at Iowa. Maryland defeated Iowa in all three meetings, including a 104–84 victory in the 2021 Big Ten tournament championship game.

In the 2023 NCAA Division I women's basketball championship game, Reese led LSU to its first national title, defeating Clark's Iowa team, and was named the tournament's Most Outstanding Player. With an average of 9.9 million viewers, it was (at that time) the most-watched women's college basketball game in history.

At the end of the game, Reese taunted Clark, making the "you can't see me" gesture. Sports media widely alleged that Clark had made the same gesture to opponents earlier in the tournament, in Iowa's Elite Eight game against Louisville. In the title game, Reese also pointed to her ring finger in reference to LSU's imminent championship ring. Following the game, Reese faced substantial criticism for perceived unsportsmanlike behavior, while many, including Clark, defended Reese and rejected the criticism, characterizing Reese's demeanor as coming from the "competitive nature" of the game.

The media have denoted the Reese taunt as the beginning of a rivalry between her and Clark. However, pundits were generally unaware of prior meetings in AAU and Big Ten play.

Clark and Reese's final collegiate meeting was in the Elite Eight of the 2024 NCAA Division I women's basketball tournament. Clark recorded 41 points and 12 assists, leading Iowa to a win over LSU, while Reese had 17 points and 20 rebounds before fouling out. At the time, the game was the most-watched women's college basketball game in history, with an average of 12.3 million viewers tuning in at any time.

=== Professional basketball ===
Both players were first-round picks in the 2024 WNBA draft, with Clark selected first overall by the Indiana Fever and Reese selected seventh by the Chicago Sky.

On June 1, 2024, they met for the first time in the WNBA, with the Fever defeating the Sky. During the game, Reese applauded from the bench when Sky guard Chennedy Carter knocked Clark to the floor on an inbounds play. After the game, Reese refused to appear at the post-game press conference and was fined $1,000 for not making herself available. Speaking to the press three days after the game, Reese commented on the WNBA's recent "surge in popularity," stating that "the reason [more people are] watching women's basketball is not just because of one person." Washington Mystics owner Sheila Johnson echoed this sentiment stating that the league's rise in popularity was "not just [because of] Caitlin Clark, it’s also [because of Angel] Reese."

==== 2024 Rookie of the Year ====
Clark won the 2024 Rookie of the Year award, but not without controversy, as one anonymous vote was cast for Reese, denying Clark a unanimous decision. Many voters and analysts were outraged, with ESPN host Andraya Carter stating, "Hats off to Caitlin, should have been unanimous, but I'll stop there," and, "If you were the person who had that one vote, you should be able to stand on it, and we should know who you are."

== Racial commentary ==
The media raised some controversies following the 2023 NCAA championship tournament. Some commentators asserted that Reese faced harsher criticism from fans for her taunts because she is black, while Clark, who is white, did not receive the same level of scrutiny.

During the 2024 season, several players commented on the increased racial and homophobic abuse received, prompting discussions about the Fever fanbase.

WNBA Finals MVP Jonquel Jones stated that she felt the rise in abuse was not reflective of most Fever fans or Clark herself, but people using Clark's popularity as a way to represent their own views.

=== Media commentary about race and popularity ===
In a discussion about the impact on the WNBA of Caitlin Clark, Angel Reese, and others, white sports analyst Pat McAfee called Clark a "white bitch superstar." He subsequently apologized, claiming he was trying to explain that she deserves "more credit than other newcomers for the league's increased popularity."

"I would like the media people [to] just call it for what it is, there's one white bitch for the Indiana team who is a superstar. Is there a chance that people just enjoy watching her play basketball because [of] how electrifying she is, what she did, what she stood for, [and] how she went about [getting it]? Maybe. But instead, we have to hear people say that we only like her because she's white." - Pat McAfee.

On March 25, 2025, ESPN basketball analyst and former Georgetown Hoyas player Monica McNutt, while interviewed by the BBC's Katty Kay about the increase in popularity of the WNBA, attributed most of it to the "exciting" rivalry between Reese and Clark. She added, that Clark is "a white girl from the middle of America. And so she represented a whole lot to a lot of people."

=== Commentary about sponsorship opportunities ===
Clark's rise in popularity and her subsequent sponsorship deals were attributed by former ESPN commentator Jemele Hill as due in part to her "race and sexuality," beyond the athlete's on-the-court achievements. Hill opined that anyone who did not say it would be "naive." Las Vegas Aces star player A'ja Wilson, asked by the media about the potential racial element in Clark's endorsements, responded that, indeed, it is a "matter of black and white," because, she claimed, "you can be top notch at what you are as a black woman [basketball player], but yet maybe that's something that people don't want to see [in consumer products]." Wilson said the whole situation makes her "blood boil," because she sees all the hard work put in by black women "swept underneath the rug." Victoria Jackson, sports historian and associate professor of history at Arizona State University, commented, "There are racial reasons for why Clark has been able to kind of break off into a completely different stratosphere from players that came before her." About Clark being characterized as a "generational talent," Professor Jackson remarked that, "athletes [who] could be placed in that category [and] who have been Black women have not had that sort of gushing attention."

Clark acknowledged the role her race has played in her popularity stating that she's "cognizant of the racial underpinnings of her stardom," adding:

I've earned every single thing, but as a white person, there is privilege. A lot of those players in the league that have been really good have been Black players. This league has kind of been built on them. The more we can appreciate that, highlight that, talk about that, and then continue to have brands and companies invest in those players that have made this league incredible, I think it's very important. I have to continue to try to change that. The more we can elevate Black women, that's going to be a beautiful thing.

Her remarks were met with an adverse reaction from commentators such as Outkick host and women's sports activist Riley Gaines, who expressed her "disappointment in Clark," saying she "missed the mark." Gaines added that "Clark needed to...remain neutral." Fox News' Megyn Kelly accused Clark of making "condescending" and "fake" comments about "white privilege." Asked about the reaction to her statement, Clark said her "best skill is blocking out the noise."

=== Flagrant fouls ===
Veteran sportscaster Bob Costas, commenting on the June 2024 Fever-Sky game in Outkick in response to a hard foul on Clark, pointed out that a flagrant foul committed by Alyssa Thomas against Reese less than a week earlier received very little media attention because both players are black, and, therefore, the incident did not "spark as much conversation." Costas added that "the second-most famous player to the average, non-initiated WNBA fan right now is Angel Reese." CNN sports journalist Cari Champion agreed, and thanked Costas for acknowledging that fouls like Carter's have happened since the league's inception. Champion went on to claim that "no one cared about the WNBA when women of a certain color [i.e., black women] were beating up and bruising each other," but now "we have this star, this woman [Clark] that people love, [and] they want to protect her."

The following season in a game between the Sky and Fever in Indianapolis on May 17, 2025, Clark committed a hard foul against Angel Reese in the third quarter, resulting in a flagrant foul for Clark and a technical for Reese. The game was later investigated by the WNBA for "hateful fan comments," with the league releasing a statement that "The WNBA strongly condemns racism, hate and discrimination in all forms — they have no place in our league or in society. We are aware of the allegations and are looking into the matter."

=== Social media ===
A 2025 study examined X/Twitter reactions in "fan discourse" related to hand gestures that Clark and Reese made during two different 2023 NCAA tournament games. The study analyzed some 700,000 tweets before, during, and after the two incidents, and claimed that public reactions were "not just different but racialized."

== Developments ==
Reese has often been characterized in the media as the antagonist in the rivalry. Some journalists have criticized and disputed the accuracy of her portrayal as the "villain" in the rivalry. Reese commented that:

it all started from the national championship game, and I've been dealing with this for two years now, [...] and understanding, like, yeah, negative things have probably been said about me, but honestly, I'll take that because look where women’s basketball is. People are talking about women's basketball that you never would think would be talking about women's basketball.

Reese added, "and just looking at that, I'll take that role. I'll take the bad guy role, and I'll continue to take that on and be that for my teammates."

=== Sportsmanship ===
Reese and Clark have both publicly downplayed the perceived rivalry. After the 2023 NCAA championship game, Clark described herself as a fan of Reese, while Reese praised Clark, saying she loves her and hopes they can be teammates in the future. Before meeting in the 2024 NCAA tournament, Reese clarified that the rivalry was "not personal," and both characterized their relationship as being driven by competition. Later that year, Clark discussed her relationship with Reese, saying, "We're not best friends, by any means, but we're very respectful of one another."

=== Legacy ===
The Clark–Reese rivalry has drawn comparisons to the rivalry between Magic Johnson and Larry Bird, which helped popularize the NBA in the 1980s.

Asked about the rivalry's "dark undertones" during an appearance on CNBC program Power Lunch in 2024, WNBA commissioner Cathy Engelbert praised the rivalry for "drawing attention to the league" and "eliminating apathy in the WNBA." She was criticized by Women's National Basketball Players Association executive director Terri Jackson, as well as by other WNBA players, for not addressing the ongoing abusive discourse. Commissioner Engelbert subsequently posted a more direct response to the "hateful online rhetoric."
