= Carey Cavanaugh =

American diplomat

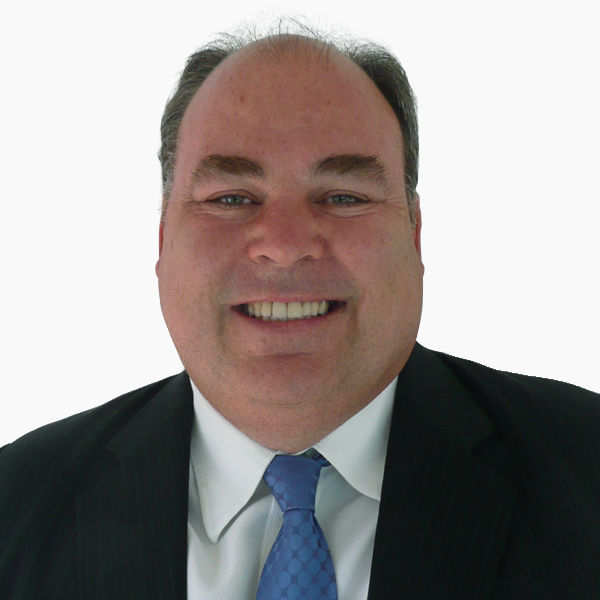

United States Ambassador and Special Negotiator for Eurasian Conflicts
- In office 1999 – 2001; Also, OSCE Minsk Group Co-chair
- President: Bill Clinton; George W. Bush
- Preceded by: Donald Keyser
- Succeeded by: Rudolf V. Perina

Special Cyprus Coordinator, Acting
- In office 1998–1999
- President: Bill Clinton
- Preceded by: James Williams
- Succeeded by: Thomas J. Miller

United States Chief of Mission to Georgia
- In office 1992 – 1992; Charge d'affaires ad interim
- President: George H. W. Bush
- Preceded by: US established relations with Georgia in April 1992
- Succeeded by: Kent N. Brown

Personal details
- Born: 1955 (age 70–71) Jacksonville, Florida, United States
- Education: Russian (B.A.); Government and International Studies (M.A.) (ABD)
- Alma mater: University of Florida; Notre Dame
- Profession: Professor; Diplomat
- Website: www.careycavanaugh.com

Carey Edward Cavanaugh (born January 1955) is a former U.S. Ambassador, peace mediator and chairman of International Alert, a London-based independent peacebuilding organization. He is currently professor emeritus of diplomacy at the University of Kentucky.

Cavanaugh had a twenty-two year Foreign Service career focused on conflict resolution, arms control, and humanitarian issues. This included diplomatic postings in Berlin, Moscow, Tbilisi, Rome, and Bern, as well as Washington assignments in the State Department, the Pentagon and on Capitol Hill. Upon leaving government service, he took a full professorship at the University of Kentucky and became director of its Patterson School of Diplomacy and International Commerce. He remains active in conflict resolution and peacebuilding, working with several leading British and European non-governmental organizations on civil society initiatives and track-two diplomatic efforts.

== Early life and education ==
Cavanaugh was born in Jacksonville and grew up in the Jacksonville Beaches (primarily Atlantic Beach). His mother—Sylvia Cavanaugh Ponti—was an artist and a writer; his father was a U.S. Navy non-commissioned officer. After his parents' divorce, he moved with his mother to Italy for two years before the family returned to Florida. He began studying Russian in ninth grade at Duncan U. Fletcher High School in Neptune Beach and put his language skills to work helping HIAS assist Jewish refugee families from the USSR resettle in North Florida and Jacksonville's Sister City Association build a relationship with the Russian naval port of Murmansk. After briefly starting with nuclear engineering, Cavanaugh majored in Russian at the University of Florida. There he was a member of Delta Chi fraternity. In 1975 he also studied briefly at Leningrad Polytechnical Institute. He earned a Bachelor of Arts degree with honors in 1976.

He went on to graduate study in government and international affairs at the University of Notre Dame, receiving a Master of Arts degree in 1978. He continued work toward a Ph.D., but left before completion in 1981 to accept a tenure-track position teaching international affairs and Soviet and East European studies at Youngstown State University in Ohio. In the summer of 1982 he was a research intern and in 1983 a visiting researcher at Radio Free Europe/Radio Liberty in Munich.

Cavanaugh later attended the U.S. Army Russian Institute (today the George C. Marshall European Center for Security Studies) in Garmisch-Partenkirchen, Germany in 1988–1989 and was a fellow at MIT's Seminar XXI in 1994–1995. In 2001–2002, he was a member of the Department of State's 44th Senior Seminar. At the Foreign Service Institute, he also studied German and Italian.

== Government service ==
Entering the Foreign Service in 1984, Cavanaugh rose to the diplomatic rank of Minister-Counselor (equivalent to the military rank of Major General). His first tour of duty was at the U.S. Mission Berlin (West) where he worked primarily on consular affairs and political reporting on Iran. This was followed by assignment to the Office of Soviet Affairs in Washington to handle bilateral relations and some arms control issues, including implementation of the Intermediate-Range Nuclear Forces Treaty. Afterwards, as a political officer at the American Embassy in Moscow, he was responsible for covering Soviet relations towards Europe (in particular the collapse of the Warsaw Pact and the Two Plus Four Agreement on German unification), arms control issues (the Treaty on Conventional Armed Forces in Europe), and the new USSR Supreme Soviet Defense and State Security Committee. He worked directly with Chairman Les Aspin (D-Wisconsin) and House Committee on Armed Services members to instruct their Supreme Soviet counterparts on how to perform legislative oversight.

In 1991–92, he was an American Political Science Association Congressional Fellow, working with Senator Carl Levin (D-Michigan) on nuclear weapons issues. When Eduard Shevardnadze became President of the Republic of Georgia in 1992, Cavanaugh was sent to Tbilisi as Chargé d'affaires, leading the team that established the U.S. embassy to that new independent state. After Tbilisi, Cavanaugh was assigned to the U.S. Embassy in Rome to cover the communist (PDS) and socialist parties (PSI), the Lega Nord, as well as European policy issues. The State Department cut short this assignment to return him to Washington to help with the multibillion-dollar assistance program for the post-Soviet states and shortly thereafter to support U.S. and international efforts to advance peace in the Caucasus, working with Swedish diplomat Jan Eliasson and Finnish diplomat (and later European Union Special Representative) Heikki Talvitie.

Under the administrations of presidents Bill Clinton and George W. Bush, Cavanaugh spearheaded or helped advance peace efforts involving Armenia, Azerbaijan, Cyprus, Georgia, Greece, Moldova, Tajikistan, and Turkey. Selected by Richard Holbrooke to serve as Director of Southern European Affairs, he was part of the team that helped prevent – via telephone – a potential military confrontation between Greece and Turkey in the Aegean Sea over the disputed islets of Imia/Kardak. Later, serving also as Acting Special Cyprus Coordinator, he received the State Department's James Clement Dunn Award for Excellence for defusing the crisis that arose when Cyprus purchased a Russian S-300 (missile) system capable of striking Turkey. He later dealt with the issue of the handling by Swiss banks of Holocaust-era bank accounts which held deposits made by victims of Nazi persecution, while serving as Deputy Chief of Mission at the U.S. Embassy in Switzerland. In 2000, he was confirmed by the U.S. Senate to be Ambassador/Special Negotiator responsible for conflicts in Eurasia and concurrently U.S. Co-chair of the OSCE Minsk Group. This assignment culminated in OSCE peace talks on Nagorno-Karabakh with the President of Azerbaijan Heydar Aliev and the President of Armenia Robert Kocharyan at the Harry S Truman Little White House in Key West, Florida.

Cavanaugh was president of the Department of State's 44th Senior Seminar in 2001–2002. Afterwards, he worked for three years as a senior inspector/team leader in State's Office of the Inspector General. Cavanaugh's final official assignment was foreign policy/political advisor to Chief of Naval Operations Admiral Michael Mullen, former chairman of the Joint Chiefs of Staff.

Since leaving government service, he has also carried out special assignments for the State Department's Inspector General in Iraq, Afghanistan, and Brazil.

== Academic work ==
Cavanaugh was appointed tenured full professor at the University of Kentucky and director of its Patterson School of Diplomacy and International Commerce in August 2006. The Patterson School is a highly ranked, selective graduate program (established in 1959) that prepares students for professional careers in international affairs. The school's hallmarks are its intimate size, low cost, and combined focus on diplomacy and business/trade. Cavanaugh held the position of director for a decade before taking academic sabbatical to be executive-in-residence at the Geneva Centre for Security Policy (GCSP) and visiting fellow at the University of Cambridge's Clare College. His policy writing and research focus primarily on peace efforts in the South Caucasus, in particular the dispute over Nagorno-Karabakh.

Under Cavanaugh's leadership, the size of this master's degree program was capped at 35 new students each year. He grew the program's co-curricular activities so that during their studies each Patterson School student would have the opportunity — at no additional cost — to visit the headquarters or manufacturing operations of 12-15 major corporations in the Midwest and South (such as Aflac, AGCO, Boeing, Brown-Forman, CME, Coca-Cola, Conagra, First Solar, General Dynamics, Eli Lilly, Invesco, Link-Belt, MillerCoors, P&G, Toyota, UPS, and U.S. Steel), US government agencies and foreign diplomatic missions. This includes exposing students directly to the U.S. armed forces with visits to Fort Benning, Fort Knox, and Wright-Patterson Air Force Base and to the work of non-governmental organizations such as the Carter Center, The Task Force for Global Health, Save the Children, and CARE. Cavanaugh also established greater engagement with defense/security entities such as the Department of Energy's Y-12 National Security Complex and Oak Ridge National Laboratory in Tennessee and the United States Army War College. He also fostered a focus on Mideast politics that has included regular student attendance at the Middle East Institute's annual conference in Washington, DC and participation in the annual Doha Forum in Qatar. His teaching focuses on diplomacy, negotiation, mediation and conflict resolution; the diplomacy of nuclear weapons; and international ethics. Cavanaugh was director of the Patterson School from 2006 to 2016. He retired from full-time teaching in 2024 becoming professor emeritus.

Cavanaugh has served repeatedly as a senior scholar for IREX (International Research & Exchanges Board). He was a founding board member of the Henry Clay Center for Statesmanship (HCCS) in 2007 and until 2013 developed the curriculum for its annual student congress. From 2012 to 2016, he was a member of the advisory council of the Woodrow Wilson International Center for Scholars' Kennan Institute. He works frequently with the United States Army War College Center for Strategic Leadership, helping conduct negotiation and conflict resolution exercises at select American universities.

From 2014 to 2017, Cavanaugh was involved in a multi-year effort to address the problem of fraternity hazing on college and university campuses in the United States and Canada, serving on a presidential commission for the North American Interfraternity Conference (NIC) The commissioners' report impacted more than 5,500 fraternity chapters on more than 800 campuses with approximately 350,000 members.

== Engagement with Peacebuilding Organizations ==
Since leaving the Foreign Service, Cavanaugh has engaged with international non-governmental organizations (NGOs) in a variety of dialogue and peacebuilding initiatives. From 2006 to 2008, he participated in high-level mediation retreats in Europe and Asia co-hosted by the Geneva-based Centre for Humanitarian Dialogue, the Royal Norwegian Ministry of Foreign Affairs, and the China Institute of International Studies. These fora were designed to improve the mediation of armed conflict by providing a discrete venue for practitioners to share expertise and promote best practices. In 2007, he joined Dame Margaret Anstee and Elizabeth Rehn in an effort to encourage the appointment of more women to senior international mediation and special envoy positions at the United Nations, European Union and OSCE. He also assisted the former World Security Institute with its Caucasus project, engaging scholars from Armenia, Azerbaijan and Georgia to build cross-cultural understanding.

In 2009, Cavanaugh took part in Conciliation Resources' "Karabakh 2014" project which commissioned papers from Armenian and Azerbaijani analysts to explore scenarios for the state of the conflict five years hence. Afterwards, he has worked through 2019 with the Karabakh Contact Group. This civil society effort, funded by the European Partnership for the Peaceful Settlement of the Conflict over Nagorno-Karabakh, has brought together activists and experts representative of all the parties to the conflict (along with outside specialists), giving them the opportunity to exchange information face-to-face, share perspectives, and jointly think through key issues impeding the peace process. He has also been part of other Track 1.5 & Track 2 diplomacy efforts related to the countries formed following the collapse of the Soviet Union.

Cavanaugh served as a director and trustee of Conciliation Resources from 2014 to 2018. This London-based international NGO was then engaged in supporting peace efforts in Colombia, the South Caucasus, Kashmir, the Philippines, Liberia and Sierra Leone (Mano River), Côte d'Ivoire, Nigeria, the Central African Republic, Uganda, and Fiji.

In 2018, Cavanaugh was appointed chairman of the Board of Trustees of International Alert. This major peacebuilding NGO was established in 1986, with Martin Ennals (former Secretary General of Amnesty International) as Secretary General and Nobel Peace Prize Laureate Archbishop Desmond Tutu as Vice Chairman. Headquartered in London, with a European office in The Hague, International Alert has staff based in 19 countries partnering with over 800 organizations on projects designed to shape policies and practices to advance peace and working with people directly affected by international conflict. Alert's principal geographic areas of operation are Africa, Asia and the Middle East, but it is also currently supporting peace activities in Colombia, the South Caucasus and Ukraine. Cavanaugh stepped down from this position in 2023.

== Additional affiliations and activities ==
Cavanaugh is a member of the Council on Foreign Relations (New York), the International Institute for Strategic Studies (London), and the American Foreign Service Association (Washington). For more than a decade, he has been a regular speaker in cities across the United States for the American Committees on Foreign Relations. He also sits on the Kentucky advisory committee of the U.S. Global Leadership Coalition (Washington), a grouping of businesses and non-profits that encourages greater support and funding for diplomacy and development.

== Awards and honors ==
Cavanaugh is the recipient of a number of State Department awards, including two individual Superior Honor awards and the James Clement Dunn Award for Excellence. In 2015, Cavanaugh was named by Delta Chi International fraternity as one of two Distinguished Delta Chis based upon his outstanding civic service in higher education and his past and continuing engagement toward advancing international peace. He was tapped as an honorary member of Florida Blue Key (the University of Florida's leadership honor society) in 2017. In 2018, Cavanaugh received the University of Florida's Distinguished Alumnus Award.

== Personal life ==
Cavanaugh married his wife Laura in 1981. They have two adult sons. Cavanaugh has two brothers: Terence Cavanaugh (an associate professor of education at the University of North Florida) and James Ponti (author of the "City Spies", "Framed" and "Dead City" mystery book series for young adults).

Diplomatic posts
First Newly recognized state	United States Chief of Mission to Georgia, Chargé d'affaires ad interim 1992	Succeeded by Ambassador Kent N. Brown
Preceded by Ambassador James Williams	U.S. Special Cyprus Coordinator, Acting; 1995–1996	Succeeded by Ambassador Thomas J. Miller
Preceded by Donald Keyser	U.S. Special Negotiator for Eurasian Conflicts and OSCE Minsk Group Co-Chairman; 1999–2001	Succeeded by Ambassador Rudolf V. Perina
Academic offices
Preceded by Professor Michael Desch	Director, Patterson School of Diplomacy and International Commerce, University of Kentucky; 2006–2016	Succeeded by Interim appointments pending restructuring
Non-profit organization positions
Preceded by Chris Mullin	Board Chair, International Alert; 2018–2023	Succeeded by David Nussbaum
