= Wubble =

US baseball COVID isolation area

The Wubble was the WNBA's 2020 coronavirus pandemic isolation zone at IMG Academy in Bradenton, Florida. The league, teams, and players used the season as a way to leverage advocacy for social justice.

== Isolation zone ==
The WNBA's 2020 coronavirus pandemic isolation zone at IMG Academy in Bradenton, Florida was nicknamed the "Wubble", a portmanteau of women and bubble.

Players and other personnel expressed concerns about whether the isolation zone could truly be safe and about the logistics of starting up play after not playing for five months. Players expressed concern about playing the season while the George Floyd protests were happening, and a conscious decision was made by players and the league to use coming together in the isolation zone and having every game nationally televised as an opportunity to advocate to the audience for social justice. The league had concerns about the long-term effects on the viability of the league of being out of sight of fans for over 20 months if the 2020 season simply didn't happen.

Players were tested daily while in the isolation zone. There were no confirmed COVID-19 cases among players and team personnel during the season and playoffs. No personnel were allowed to leave the isolation zone except for limited reasons such as family or medical emergency, after which they were required to re-quarantine for seven to ten days.

ESPN made a 2021 documentary about the WNBA isolation zone, 144.

== Personnel entering the isolation zone ==
The entire season was played inside the isolation zone. The league allowed players to bring their families and a caregiver with them into the isolation zone. According to ESPN's documentary about the Wubble, 144 players came into the isolation zone. The WNBA said that in all the league had 315 people inside the zone. ESPN reporter Holly Rowe was the only journalist inside. Other journalists onsite were required to follow specific protocols to keep them separated from those in the isolation zone.

The week before training camp started the league tested 137 players, and 7 tested positive. On July 6, eleven teams travelled to Bradenton; the Indiana Fever arrived July 11 because of quarantining players. Within the first few days two more players, Atlanta Dream players Kalani Brown and Glory Johnson, tested positive.

=== Los Angeles Sparks ===
Los Angeles Sparks player Candace Parker brought her eleven-year-old daughter in. Nneka Ogwumike came in. Sparks assistant coach Fred Williams did not come into the isolation zone for medical reasons. Chiney Ogwumike and Kristi Toliver opted out for medical reasons. Players Brittney Sykes and Reshanda Gray and trainer Courtney Watson came in.

=== Phoenix Mercury ===
Phoenix Mercury player Diana Taurasi came into the isolation zone without her wife Penny Taylor and their toddler son. Taylor gave up her job as a Mercury assistant coach for the season. Ten of eleven Mercury players came into the isolation zone; Jessica Breland was medically exempt.

=== Seattle Storm ===
Seattle Storm head coach Dan Hughes did not come into the isolation zone for medical reasons. Breanna Stewart, Morgan Tuck, Epiphanny Prince, Ezi Magbegor, Jewell Loyd, Alysha Clark, and Sue Bird came in, Bird with her girlfriend Megan Rapinoe.

=== Washington Mystics ===
Washington Mystics player Tina Charles was medically excused. Natasha Cloud opted out to pursue social justice reform. Elena Delle Donne was denied a medical waiver but the Mystics agreed to pay her salary. Players Alaina Coates, Ariel Atkins and Leilani Mitchell came in.

=== Las Vegas Aces ===
Las Vegas Aces player Liz Cambage received a medical waiver. Kelsey Plum did not come in. Dearica Hamby brought her daughter into the zone, along with her mother as a caregiver. A'ja Wilson and Angel McCoughtry came in along with coach Bill Laimbeer.

=== Atlanta Dream ===
Atlanta Dream player Renee Montgomery opted out to pursue social justice reform after Dream owner Kelly Loeffler made a statement criticizing the league for announcing the opening weekend would be dedicated to Black Lives Matter. Players Glory Johnson, Courtney Williams, Chennedy Carter, Tianna Hawkins, Blake Dietrick, Kalani Brown and Elizabeth Williams and head coach Nicki Collen came in.

=== New York Liberty ===
New York Liberty players Layshia Clarendon, Kia Nurse, Kiah Stokes, Amanda Zahui B and Sabrina Ionescu came into the zone.

=== Indiana Fever ===
Indiana Fever player Natalie Achonwa came in.

=== Chicago Sky ===
Chicago Sky head coach James Wade came in. Players Stefanie Dolson, Diamond DeShields, and Sydney Colson came in.

=== Dallas Wings ===
Dallas Wings player Satou Sabally came in.

=== Connecticut Sun ===
Player Jasmine Thomas came in.

=== Minnesota Lynx ===
Head coach Cheryl Reeve brought her five-year-old son into the isolation zone with her. Players joining in include Napheesa Collier, Sylvia Fowles and Bridget Carleton.

== Season ==
The season had been scheduled to start May 15 but in February was announced would be postponed. On June 15 the league announced it would play a condensed season inside an isolation zone. Training camp started in early July and the season started July 25. The opening weekend, two days of triple headers with all twelve teams competing, was televised on ABC, ESPN and CBS. Players wore Black Lives Matter and Say Her Name slogans on t-shirts and jerseys and venues displayed courtside signage. Alysha Clark said, "Every game that we played this season was a chance to be in front of an audience...(and) we wanted to educate them about something that we were fighting for."

According to players' union president Nneka Ogwumike, 70% of the 2020 season consisted of every-other-day play as compared to 20-30% during a normal season; player fatigue became an issue. The first matchup was New York Liberty vs. Seattle Storm. The regular season ended September 13. The first game of the playoff semifinals between the Seattle Storm and the Minnesota Lynx was postponed because of "inconclusive" COVID-19 tests; after additional testing the playoffs resumed two days later. The Seattle Storm won the title, their fourth, against the Aces. Season MVP was A'ja Wilson. While shaking champaigne bottles and being showered in confetti the Storm players shouted, "We're going home!"

During the season and playoffs television viewership increased by an estimated 68%.

== Focus on social justice ==
In early July, in announcing the revised 22-game season schedule, the league announced opening weekend would be dedicated to Black Lives Matter, with a focus on advocating justice for women and girls. The announcement drew immediate pushback from Atlanta Dream owner Kelly Loeffler. The league and players' union responded by dedicating the entire season, which was played during the George Floyd protests, to racial justice, and by jointly creating the WNBA/WNBPA Social Justice Council. Teams also supported voting rights, joining the More Than a Vote campaign to encourage people to register and plan ahead to make sure they'd be able to vote. They protested the criticism of Black Lives Matter by Atlanta Dream owner Kelly Loeffler, wearing t-shirts urging fans to vote for Loeffler's senate race opponent Raphael Warnock, who later won.

The league halted competition in late August, postponing games, to protest the shooting of Jacob Blake, stating in their official announcement that "this was the reason for the 2020 season." They released an August 28 statement asking for action not only in the shooting of Blake but in the deaths or shootings of Breonna Taylor, Sandra Bland, Michelle Cusseaux, Shelly Frey, Korryn Gaines, India Kager, Kayla Moore, Layleen Polanco, and Michelle Shirley.

Alysha Clark said, "Every game that we played this season was a chance to be in front of an audience...(and) we wanted to educate them about something that we were fighting for." Sue Bird said, "Had we not had a season, sadly, our voices just wouldn't have been heard...the only way to make it happen is to play basketball."
