= Isabelle Cheng =

Taiwanese spy

- Born: 程念慈; Cheng Nian-tzu; Taiwan
- Occupation: Intelligence Agent

Isabelle Cheng (Chinese: 程念慈; pinyin: Chéng Niàncí), also known as Cheng Nian-tzu, was an intelligence agent for the National Security Bureau of Taiwan.

She came to public attention when her relationship with Donald Keyser, an official of the United States Department of State, became part of criminal charges against Keyser — in 2005, Keyser pleaded guilty to lying about the relationship, and to unauthorized possession of secret documents. Keyser has not been charged with espionage, however. While in the United States, Cheng was operating from the Taipei Economic and Cultural Representative Office in Washington, but has since been called back to Taiwan. Cheng assisted the FBI in their investigation of Keyser.
