= Homosexuality in basketball =

Homosexuality in basketball has historically been a sensitive topic, both in professional leagues and at the college level. It has historically been treated as a taboo subject, marked by episodes of discrimination and homophobia, as well as by increasing efforts toward inclusion within the sport at both international and national levels. For decades, the limited visibility of openly gay players reflected broader cultural barriers in the sporting environment, where social stigma and institutional pressures often hindered the public expression of sexual orientation. However, since the early 21st century, various sports organizations, professional leagues, players’ associations, and clubs have implemented diversity policies, anti-discrimination campaigns, and inclusion programs, gradually contributing to a more open and inclusive environment for athletes of different sexual orientations.

Under the International Safeguarding Policy adopted by the FIBA and in force since 2022, any form of discrimination within activities organized by the federation is prohibited, including discrimination based on sexual orientation, gender identity, or other personal characteristics. These provisions aim to ensure that players, coaches, officials, and other participants in basketball operate in a safe, respectful, and inclusive environment, and require affiliated federations to adopt preventive measures, reporting mechanisms, and disciplinary procedures to address discriminatory conduct in professional basketball.

== Men’s basketball ==
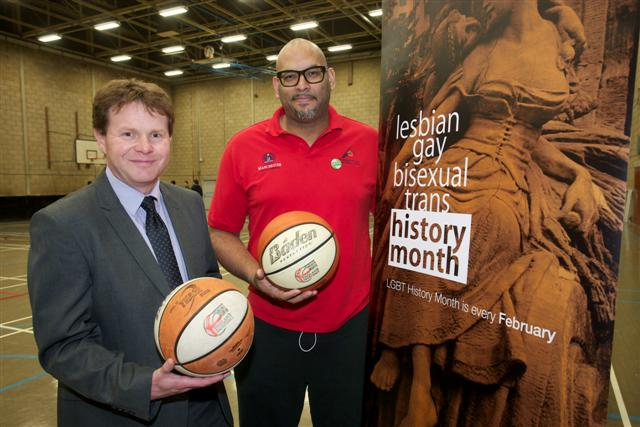
John Amaechi at an LGBTQ History Month event in the United States (2011).

Historically, men’s basketball has been associated with a strong cultural emphasis on hegemonic masculinity, where players are expected to demonstrate physical strength, aggression, and dominance as defining traits of male athletic identity. Within this context, homosexuality has often been stereotypically and prejudicially linked with femininity and weakness, creating a cultural clash between prevailing norms of masculinity and the acceptance of sexual diversity in the sport. In the early 21st century, some professional basketball players began publicly disclosing their sexual orientation as homosexuals, contributing to greater visibility of diversity within the sport.

In 1986, following the second Gay Games, Tony Jasinski organized the San Francisco Gay Basketball Association.

In 2007, British former Utah Jazz and Orlando Magic player player John Amaechi announced that he was gay, becoming the first former NBA player to do so. Amaechi had retired in 2003. His announcement highlighted the social and professional pressures that active players had historically faced when considering whether to disclose their sexual orientation in professional basketball. In relation to this, former player Shavlik Randolph stated in an interview that while Amaechi’s sexual orientation would not affect his ability to play alongside him, it could create “awkwardness in the locker room.”

At the executive level, Rick Welts, president of the Golden State Warriors, publicly came out as gay in 2011, becoming the first high-ranking executive in American professional basketball to do so.

In April 2013, Jason Collins came out as gay in an interview with Sports Illustrated, becoming the first active professional basketball player to do so. President Barack Obama contacted him offering his support. In 2014, Jason Collins played for the Brooklyn Nets of the NBA, making him the first openly gay athlete to play in any of the four major North American professional sports leagues.

In 2014, shortly after the end of the season, sophomore starting guard Derrick Gordon of the University of Massachusetts Amherst came out as gay, making him the first Division I men's basketball player to do so while still playing in college. Later that year, he became the first openly gay player in Division I to play in a men's basketball game. In 2016, as a player for Seton Hall University, he became the first openly gay man to play in the March Madness tournament.

Jesse Taylor, a basketball player at Dakota Wesleyan University, came out as gay in 2015, making him South Dakota's first openly gay college athlete.

In 2015, Bryant University assistant basketball coach Chris Burns came out as gay, making him the first openly gay coach in NCAA Division I men's basketball.

In March 2020, Argentine player Sebastián Vega came out as gay through his social media accounts, becoming the first Argentine and South American professional basketball player to do so. He later discussed the difficulties faced by openly gay male players on the court, noting that homophobic slurs are frequently used as insults.

In June 2020, Chilean player Daniel Arcos publicly came out as gay, becoming the first openly gay professional basketball player in Chile.

In January 2021, Swiss player Marco Lehmann came out as gay, while also speaking about the fear and stress experienced by gay players.

In November 2022, Australian player Isaac Humphries became the first Australian professional basketball player to publicly come out as gay.In January 2026, Australian player Andrew Ogilvy came out as gay in an interview, stating that he had often felt compelled to present himself professionally as heterosexual, concealing his sexual orientation.

== Women's basketball ==
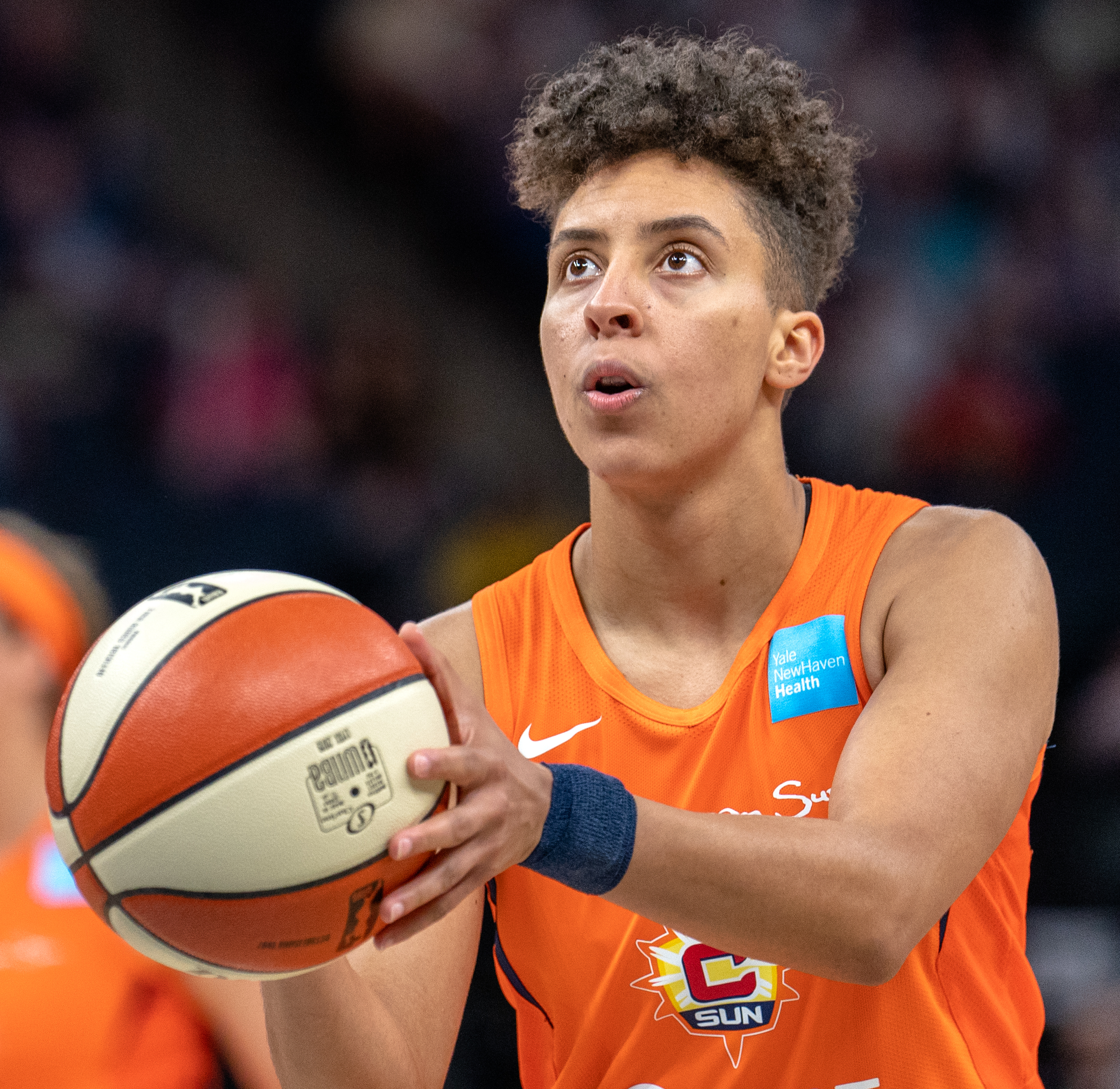
Layshia Clarendon became the first openly transgender WNBA player in 2020.

In 1999, Carol Blazejowski, general manager of the New York Liberty, came out as a lesbian and became the first general manager in the Women's National Basketball Association (WNBA) to do so.

In 2002, Sue Wicks came out as gay, making her the first openly gay person playing in the WNBA.

The case of Jennifer Harris against Penn State, more specifically their women's basketball coach Rene Portland, was about homosexuality. In 2006, a gay rights advocacy group, the National Center for Lesbian Rights, accused Rene Portland of forcing player Jennifer Harris to transfer because of bias against lesbians. The advocacy group claimed that Portland was biased against lesbians for decades and cited a 1986 interview in which she claimed she talked to recruits and parents of recruits about lesbians stating, "I will not have it in my program." There were also claims of Portland telling key recruits—to discourage them from attending another school—that the other team was "full of lesbians". The lawsuit was eventually settled out of court and Penn State found Portland in violation of policy. She was fined $10,000 by the university in lieu of a one-game suspension and warned that another infraction would result in the termination of her employment. Portland eventually resigned from her coaching position.

Many WNBA players have since come out as gay; for example, Brittney Griner came out in 2013, and Elena Delle Donne came out in 2016. In 2025, openly gay players were estimated to make up 28% of the league.

In 2016, Curt Miller, head coach of the Connecticut Sun, became the first openly gay male head coach in the WNBA. He is believed to be the first openly gay male head coach of any professional sports team in the U.S.

Circa 2020, Layshia Clarendon came out as non-binary, making them first openly transgender and non-binary WNBA player. Clarendon was also the first active WNBA player to have top surgery. Clarendon uses they/them, he/him, and she/her pronouns.

== See also ==
- Homosexuality in modern sports
- Transgender people in sports
