= Women's National Basketball Players Association =

Trade union

WNBPA
- Women's National Basketball Players Association
- Founded: November 6, 1998; 27 years ago
- Type: Trade union
- Headquarters: 1133 Avenue of the Americas, New York, NY
- Location: United States
- Executive Director: Terri Jackson
- President: Nneka Ogwumike
- Board of directors: Executive Committee
- Website: wnbpa.com

The Women's National Basketball Players Association (WNBPA) is the players' union for the Women's National Basketball Association (WNBA). It formed in 1998 and was the first trade union for female professional athletes.

== History ==
The Women's National Basketball Players Association (WNBPA) was formed in 1998 after the end of the WNBA league's second season. Players were protesting average salaries of $30,000 (equivalent to $59,259 in 2025) and lack of health care benefits, retirement plans, and revenue sharing. It was the first trade union for professional women athletes. According to its website it was the first trade union to ratify a collective bargaining agreement (CBA) in women's professional sports. The union's first director was Pamela Wheeler.

== Collective bargaining agreements ==
The WNBPA ratified its first CBA on 30 April 1999. According to its website it was the first CBA ratified in professional women's sports. It included provisions to raise the minimum salary for established players to $30,000 (from $15,000), health care benefits that extended to the off-season, a retirement plan, paid maternity leave, and revenue sharing.

The WNBPA threatened to strike in 2003 if a new deal was not worked out between players and the league. The result was a delay in the start of the 2003 preseason. The 2003 WNBA draft was also delayed.

In 2014 the league and the union made an 8-year collective bargaining agreement which allowed an opt-out after the 2019 season.

In January 2020, the league and the union announced they had reached a tentative agreement that represented a "profound shift" in compensation for players and the resources available to them. Under the agreement the average player salary would "exceed six figures for the first time." The agreement also covered revenue sharing, travel standards, and maternity and childcare benefits. Billie Jean King, part owner of the Los Angeles Sparks, said the agreement would "redefine what it means to be a professional female athlete today.” Sports Illustrated called it a "groundbreaking, glass-ceiling-cracking" agreement which was the "first of its kind in pro sports" in addressing the needs of working parents. The league expected the salary increase to benefit the WNBA by helping prevent players from resorting to off-season play in Europe, Asia, and Australia in order to increase their earnings, as the extra playing time increases the risk of injuries that may affect WNBA competition and the extended time working outside the US affects players' availability to promote the league off-season. Shortly afterward the union negotiated with the league on how to create the Wubble, a coronavirus bubble designed to allow the WNBA to play a shortened 2020 season.

== Other projects ==
Shortly after the George Floyd protests began in 2020, the league and the players' union agreed to put Say Her Name and Black Lives Matter slogans on warmup gear and uniforms for opening weekend. On 6 July, the WNBA announced their pandemic-shortened season would be "dedicated to social justice." In early July 2020, Atlanta Dream owner Senator Kelly Loeffler criticized the league's support for Black Lives Matter and asked the league commissioner Cathy Engelbert to drop support of the Black Lives Matter movement. Engelbert refused, releasing a statement saying the league would "continue to use our platforms to vigorously advocate for social justice," and the WNBA and WNBPA announced the joint formation of the Social Justice Council by the league and union.

== Presidents ==
- Nneka Ogwumike (from 2016)
- Tamika Catchings (2004-2016)
- Sonja Henning (2001 - 2003)
- Coquese Washington (1999-2001)

== Recognition ==
In 2021 the NAACP gave the WNBPA their Jackie Robinson Award (shared with Steph Curry) in recognition for the union's work advocating for social justice.
