= Layshia Clarendon =

American basketball player (born 1991)

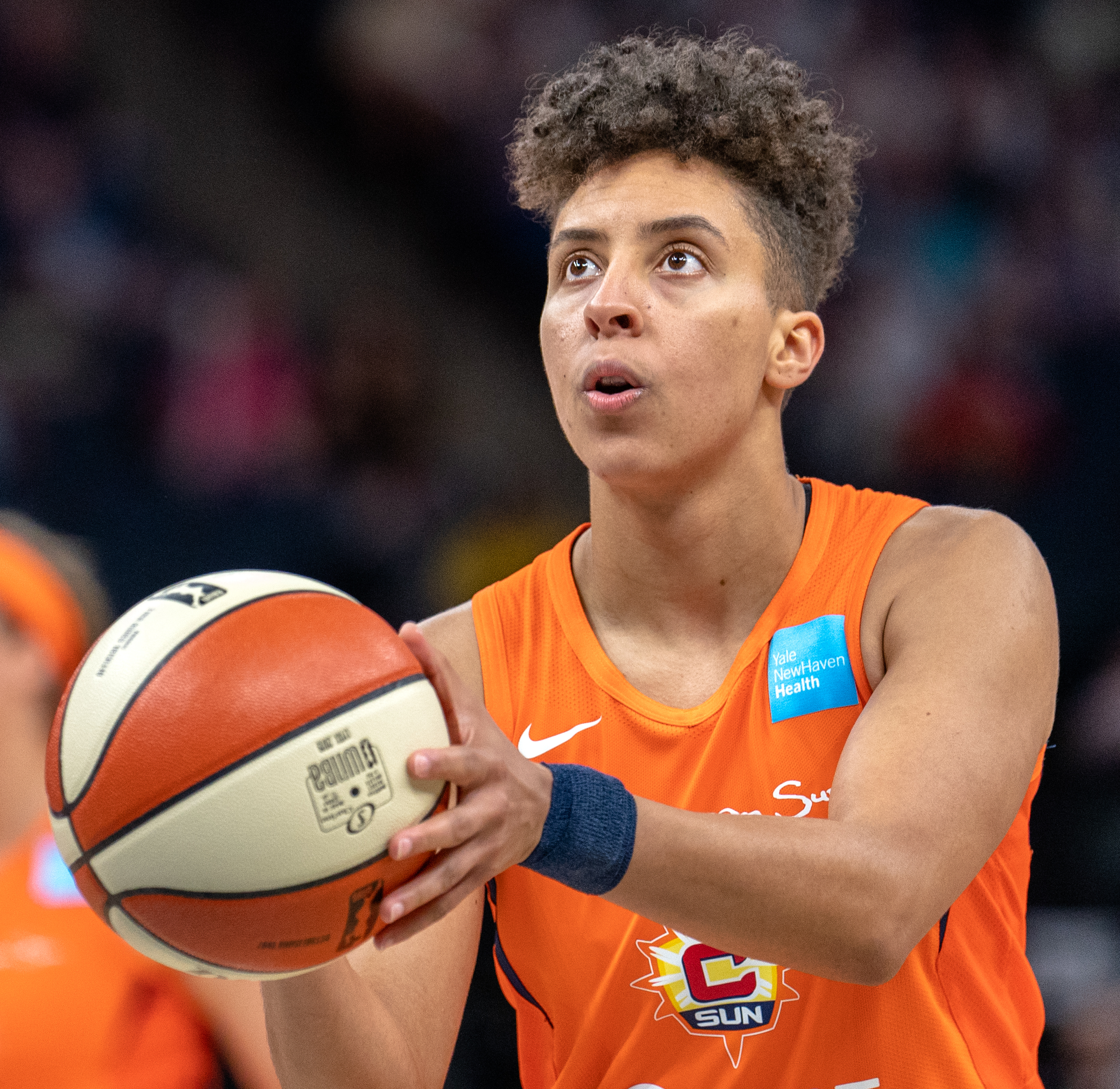
- Clarendon in 2019

Personal information
- Born: May 2, 1991 (age 35) San Bernardino, California, U.S.
- Listed height: 5 ft 9 in (1.75 m)
- Listed weight: 158 lb (72 kg)

Career information
- High school: Cajon (San Bernardino, California)
- College: California (2009–2013)
- WNBA draft: 2013: 1st round, 9th overall pick
- Drafted by: Indiana Fever
- Playing career: 2013–2024
- Position: Shooting guard
- Number: 25

Career history
- 2013–2015: Indiana Fever
- 2016–2018: Atlanta Dream
- 2018–2019: Connecticut Sun
- 2020–2021: New York Liberty
- 2021: Minnesota Lynx
- 2023–2024: Los Angeles Sparks

Career highlights
- WNBA All-Star (2017); 2× All-Pac-12 (2012, 2013)
- Stats at Basketball Reference
Medals
Women's basketball
Representing the United States
World Cup
Gold medal – first place	2018 Spain
FIBA Under-19 World Cup
Gold medal – first place	2009 Thailand	Team

Layshia Renee Clarendon (born May 2, 1991) is an American former professional basketball player. They (Note: Clarendon uses they/them, he/him, and she/her pronouns. This article uses they/them for consistency.) played eleven seasons in the Women's National Basketball Association (WNBA). Clarendon was the first openly transgender and non-binary WNBA player, and the first active WNBA player to have top surgery.

== College career ==
Before starting college, Clarendon went to high school at Cajon High School. Clarendon completed their college career at the University of California, Berkeley in 2013. The 2012–2013 season saw them become a leader of the team and received national recognition for their abilities, culminating in their place as a finalist for the Senior Class Award.

According to Clarendon's coach Lindsay Gottlieb, "[Clarendon was] vocal in terms of helping us achieve those goals and being a leader off the court and talking to her teammates, but you're never necessarily going to notice that on the court."

For the 2012–2013 regular season, the Clarendon-led Bears lived up to expectations, compiling a 28–2 record (excluding the Pac-12 Tournament) and earning a 2nd seed in the NCAA tournament. Clarendon and the Bears also enjoyed post season success, resulting in the team's first Final Four appearance. The Bears lost in the national semifinals to Louisville.

== National team career ==
Clarendon was named to the USA Women's U19 team which represented the US in the 2009 U19 World's Championship, held in Bangkok, Thailand in July and August 2009. Clarendon scored 4.5 points per game, and helped the USA team to an 8–1 record and the gold medal.

Clarendon was named to the senior team roster for the 2018 FIBA Women's Basketball World Cup and helped the team to a 6–0 record and the gold medal.

== Professional career ==
=== WNBA ===
==== Indiana Fever (2013–2015) ====
Clarendon was selected ninth overall in the 2013 WNBA draft by the Indiana Fever. During Clarendon's rookie year, they played in 30 games and averaged just under 20 minutes per game. Clarendon played three years for the Fever helping make the playoffs in every year that they were part of the team. They reached the WNBA Finals in their last season with the Fever, falling just short of a title.

==== Atlanta Dream (2016–2018) ====
On May 2, 2016, the Fever traded Clarendon to the Atlanta Dream for a 2nd round pick in the 2017 WNBA draft.

Clarendon immediately became the Dream's starting point guard in their first season, starting 32 out of 34 games. In her first start for the Dream, Clarendon set a new career-high with 19 points and grabbed six rebounds in 31 minutes against their former team, the Indiana Fever. She also had a career-high with 19 points, grabbed six rebounds and dished out four assists in the Dream's win over the Connecticut Sun.

On February 1, 2017 Clarendon re-signed with the Dream – bringing them back to Atlanta for the 2017 season. Clarendon again had a fantastic season, making their only All-Star game. At the All-Star game, Clarendon recorded 14 points and 10 assists. Clarendon also registered a "unofficial" triple double during the year when they recorded 15 points, 11 assists, and 10 rebounds in Atlanta's overtime win over Phoenix. The league reviewed the stats and ultimately took away 2 assists, erasing Clarendon's triple double.

During the 2018 season, Clarendon played 18 games with the Dream before being traded.

==== Connecticut Sun (2018–2019) ====
On July 9, 2018, the Dream traded Clarendon and a 2019 second round draft pick to the Connecticut Sun for Alex Bentley. Clarendon played in 15 regular season games and one playoff game for the Sun. They averaged 5.4 points per game and 2.7 assists. They scored a season-high 14 points in the Sun's victory over the Lynx on August 17.

Clarendon was hoping to be a key reserve for the Sun going into the 2019 season, but their season got derailed after sustaining an ankle injury that required surgery. After surgery, Clarendon was expected to be out for three-to-four months. The Sun had a very successful season making it all the way to the WNBA Finals, and Clarendon was hoping to make it back in time to play, but ultimately wasn't ready and healthy to play.

==== New York Liberty (2020–2021) ====
Clarendon signed with the New York Liberty on February 10. Coach Walt Hopkins stated that Clarendon "is an elite facilitator and floor general with an extremely high basketball IQ... 'not only leads vocally, but also by consistently modeling a tireless work ethic and respect for those around her. She is going to be a massive boon to our roster and our team culture – both on, and off of the court.'" Clarendon was expected to be a mentor to incoming first overall draft pick Sabrina Ionescu. When Ionescu went down with an ankle injury, Clarendon's role increased. They started for the Liberty and averaged career-highs in field goal percentage with 46.5 percent and points with 11.5 per game. They also averaged 2.5 rebounds and 3.9 assists per contest.

Clarendon made the 2021 Liberty roster, but only played three minutes in the opening night game vs the Indiana Fever. After failing to appear in the next two games for the Liberty, Clarendon was waived.

==== Minnesota Lynx (2021) ====
Clarendon signed a hardship contract with the Lynx on May 31, 2021, due to the Lynx falling under the roster number due to multiple injuries. Clarendon played that night for the Lynx and sparked a run to help the Lynx get their first win of the season. Clarendon finished with 12 points. Due to how hardship contracts work, Clarendon had to be released multiple times once the injured players became healthy. Unfortunately for the Lynx, they continued to have injuries to many players, which benefited Clarendon, who continued to be signed by the Lynx. On July 2, Clarendon was able to sign with the Lynx on a Rest of the Season deal. Clarendon had a strong season for the Lynx, but struggled as the year ended with a right fibula injury. They finished the season averaging 10.4 points, 5.7 assists, and 3.1 rebounds.

During the 2022 offseason, Clarendon re-signed with Minnesota. On May 3, 2022, after going through all of training camp with the Lynx, Clarendon was waived and did not make the final roster. Clarendon did not play in the 2022 season.

==== Los Angeles Sparks (2023–2024) ====
On February 7, 2023, Clarendon signed a training camp contract with the Los Angeles Sparks. They made the roster and started in 24 games for the team. On September 7, 2023, Clarendon recorded a career-high 30 points in an 96–89 loss to the Liberty.

On February 1, 2024, Clarendon re-signed with the Sparks for the 2024 WNBA season. In the first game of the season on May 15, Clarendon recorded their first career triple-double, posting 11 points, 10 rebounds, and 10 assists in an 92–81 loss to Atlanta. They became only the fourth player in Sparks history, after Lisa Leslie, Candace Parker, and Chelsea Gray, to achieve this feat. Clarendon appeared in 21 games during the season, playing in only one game following the Olympic break, due to mental health reasons. Clarendon retired from the WNBA on September 20, 2024 after 11 seasons.

== Career statistics ==
Legend
GP	Games played	GS	Games started	MPG	Minutes per game	RPG	Rebounds per game
APG	Assists per game	SPG	Steals per game	BPG	Blocks per game	PPG	Points per game
TO	Turnovers per game	FG%	Field-goal percentage	3P%	3-point field-goal percentage	FT%	Free-throw percentage
**Bold**	Career best	°	League leader

=== WNBA ===
==== Regular season ====
Stats current through end of 2024 season

WNBA regular season statistics
Year	Team	GP	GS	MPG	FG%	3P%	FT%	RPG	APG	SPG	BPG	TO	PPG
2013	Indiana	30	4	19.4	.331	.259	.409	1.8	1.8	0.5	0.0	1.3	4.2
2014	Indiana	29	3	13.7	.402	.316	.708	1.4	1.2	0.4	0.0	1.0	4.2
2015	Indiana	29	12	20.8	.445	.406	.765	2.7	2.0	0.7	0.0	1.6	6.7
2016	Atlanta	**34**	32	28.2	.466	.346	.765	**4.3**	3.5	0.7	**0.1**	2.2	10.4
2017	Atlanta	**34**	**33**	**29.8**	.378	.180	.879	3.8	**6.6**	0.9	**0.1**	2.6	10.7
2018	Atlanta	18	4	17.3	.329	.143	.800	2.1	1.7	0.4	0.0	1.3	4.3
2018	Connecticut	15	0	15.9	.492	.000	.826	1.6	2.7	0.5	0.0	**0.9**	5.4
2019	Connecticut	9	0	15.3	.419	**1.000**	.857	2.4	2.1	0.3	0.0	**0.9**	6.2
2020	New York	19	19	26.1	.465	.341	.873	2.5	3.9	0.9	0.0	3.4	**11.5**
2021	New York	1	0	3.0	—	—	—	0.0	0.0	0.0	0.0	2.0	0.0
2021	Minnesota	21	20	25.7	**.517**	.357	.784	3.1	5.7	0.6	0.0	3.0	10.4
2022	Did not play (waived)												
2023	Los Angeles	24	24	28.6	.497	.457	**.915**	3.0	3.4	**1.1**	0.0	2.3	11.1
2024	Los Angeles	21	12	16.0	.427	.350	.870	1.8	2.6	0.7	0.0	1.2	4.3
**Career**	11 years, 6 teams	284	163	22.2	.432	.318	.810	2.7	3.2	0.7	0.0	1.9	7.6
**Career**	All-Star	1	0	17.7	.600	.500	—	2.0	10.0	1.0	0.0	2.0	14.0

==== Playoffs ====
WNBA playoff statistics
Year	Team	GP	GS	MPG	FG%	3P%	FT%	RPG	APG	SPG	BPG	TO	PPG
2013	Indiana	4	0	15.3	.476	**.600**	.250	0.5	2.0	0.5	0.0	1.5	6.0
2014	Indiana	5	0	7.4	.231	.000	—	1.2	0.6	0.2	0.0	0.8	1.2
2015	Indiana	**9**	0	6.1	.500	.000	**1.000**	0.7	0.6	0.1	0.0	0.3	1.3
2016	Atlanta	2	**2**	**32.0**	**.533**	.250	.625	**6.0**	**6.0**	0.0	**1.0**	2.0	**11.0**
2018	Connecticut	1	0	10.0	.500	—	—	0.0	0.0	**1.0**	0.0	**0.0**	2.0
2021	Minnesota	1	1	12.0	.000	.000	—	1.0	0.0	**1.0**	0.0	1.0	0.0
**Career**	6 years, 4 teams	22	3	10.9	.435	.333	.571	1.2	1.3	0.3	0.1	0.9	3.0

=== College ===
NCAA statistics
Year	Team	GP	GS	MPG	FG%	3P%	FT%	RPG	APG	SPG	BPG	TO	PPG
2009–10	California	**37**	28	24.9	.362	.262	**.787**	4.5	2.3	0.8	0.1	2.5	8.9
2010–11	California	34	34	33.5	.400	**.337**	.696	**5.4**	**3.5**	1.5	0.1	3.2	13.2
2011–12	California	35	35	33.8	.413	.327	.698	3.9	2.6	1.5	0.1	2.0	12.8
2012–13	California	36	**36**	**35.5**	**.452**	.325	.665	4.0	2.8	**1.7**	0.1	**1.9**	**16.4**
**Career**		142	133	31.8	.410	.313	.697	4.4	2.8	1.4	0.1	2.4	12.8

== Activism ==
In 2015, Clarendon won Outsports' "Female Hero of the Year", for using their platform in support of LGBTQ+ people in sports. Clarendon stated that they wish to "open closet doors for women across sports".

In 2017, Clarendon discussed the issues within the WNBA in regards to the inclusion of LGBTQ+ people. Clarendon stated that during their early career playing for the Indiana Fever, the team was attempting to include LGBTQ+ individuals by participating in a "Diversity Night" during Pride month, which Clarendon felt was confusingly named, as a way to avoid the true purpose of Pride month. As Clarendon began playing for other teams, they stated that they saw the league becoming more accepting of the LGBTQ+ community.

In 2020, the WNBA and the Players Association branded the upcoming season "Social Justice Season", to emphasize issues including race, gun violence, and LGBTQ+ advocacy. Clarendon was named as one of the players on the league's Social Justice Council, which was tasked with engaging community conversations, advocacy, and education on topics surrounding social justice.

The beginning of the 2020 season saw Clarendon involved in protest around the shooting of Breonna Taylor and the "Say her Name" campaign which had begun in 2014. Black Lives Matter was also a predominant message and was visible on the courts during the season.

The Commissioner of the WNBA, Cathy Engelbert, has shown her support for Clarendon by saying, "We are so proud that Layshia is part of the WNBA and we know that their voice and continued advocacy will not only support and help honor and uplift many other non-binary and trans people." The New York Liberty and the WNBA players' union have also shown their support for the transition. The owner of the New York Liberty team, Joseph Tsai, released a statement supporting Clarendon saying that they are "a proud embodiment of our belief that our strength lies in our truth and no one should live constrained by societal boundaries."

== Personal life ==
In 2017, Clarendon married Jessica Dolan. Clarendon and Dolan announced the birth of "#babyC" on December 25, 2020, and have not released the name or assigned sex at birth of the baby. Clarendon later stated they were raising "Baby C" with gender expansiveness.

Circa 2020, Clarendon came out as non-binary. Clarendon uses they/them, he/him, and she/her pronouns. In 2015, Clarendon described themself "black, gay, female, non-cisgender and Christian".

In 2021, Clarendon underwent chest masculinization surgery to remove breast tissue.

== See also ==
- Homosexuality in basketball
- Transgender people in sports
