= Rick Welts =

National Basketball Association executive

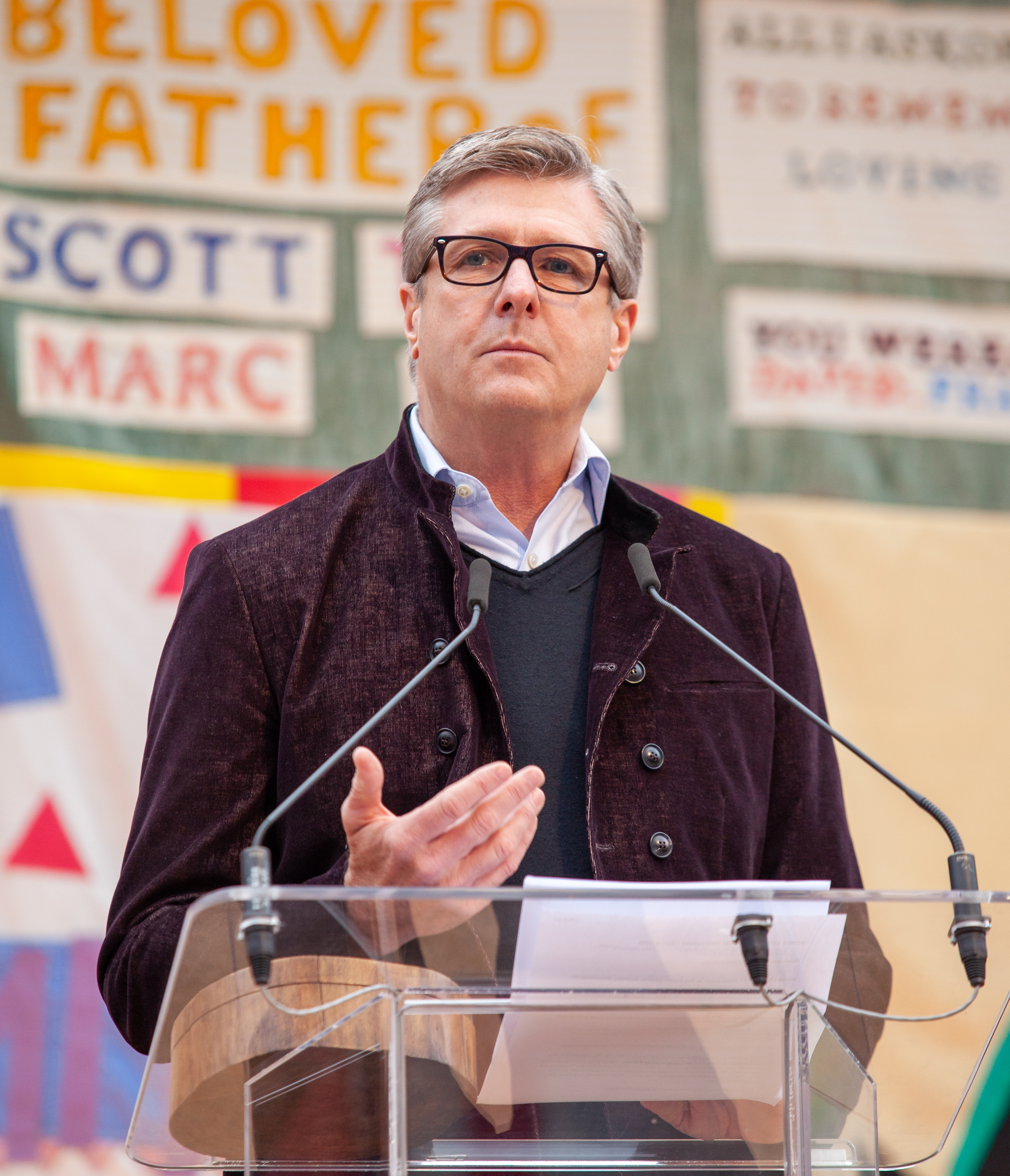

Dallas Mavericks
- Position: CEO
- League: NBA

Personal information
- Born: January 21, 1953 (age 73) Seattle, Washington, U.S.

Career information
- College: University of Washington

Rick Welts (born January 21, 1953) is an American sports executive who is the chief executive officer for the Dallas Mavericks of the National Basketball Association (NBA). Welts had also served as the president and chief executive officer of the Phoenix Suns from July 2002 until September 9, 2011. He was the president of the Golden State Warriors from 2011 until 2021 and stayed with the team as an advisor until 2024. From 1996 to 1999, he was the third-highest-ranking official in the NBA as its executive vice president and chief marketing officer.

== Biography ==
Born in Seattle, Washington, Welts attended the University of Washington where he joined the Delta Chi fraternity.

He worked for the Seattle SuperSonics from 1969 to 1979 in various capacities, from an initial stint as a ballboy to director of public relations when the SuperSonics won their (to date) only NBA Championship in 1979.

Welts later worked at the NBA's league offices from 1982 to 1999, eventually rising to the positions of executive vice president, chief marketing officer and president of NBA Properties. During this time, he was credited with the creation of the NBA All-Star Weekend concept in 1984 and, as the agent for USA Basketball, the marketing campaign for the 1992 Barcelona Olympics "Dream Team." He was named Brandweek's 1998 Marketer of the Year for his work with WNBA President Val Ackerman in launching the WNBA.

On May 15, 2011, Welts publicly came out as gay in an interview with The New York Times. He is the first prominent American sports executive to come out and be openly gay, setting an important precedent for the acceptance of homosexuality in professional basketball. Welts is a member of the advisory board for You Can Play, a campaign dedicated to fighting homophobia in sports.

Welts's first partner, whom he had met in a Seattle restaurant in 1977, died in March 1994 due to AIDS. Welts ran one obituary in Seattle that suggested anyone who wanted to make a remembrance could write a check to the University of Washington architectural school, his partner's major. Welts was in another relationship from 1995 to 2009, which ended in part because of Welts' requirement that their relationship be hidden from public view.

On September 9, 2011, Welts announced he was resigning his position with the Suns in order to relocate to northern California and live with his new partner there. A few weeks later, Welts signed on as team president for the Warriors. During his tenure, his leadership would help turn the Warriors into a perennial contender, winning three out of five championships from 2015 to 2019. On March 31, 2018, it was announced Welts would be inducted into the Naismith Basketball Hall of Fame.

On January 10, 2020, Welts married Todd Gage, his partner of nine years, at San Francisco City Hall. The ceremony was officiated by mayor London Breed.

On April 8, 2021, Welts announced that he would step away from his position with the Warriors at the end of the season, but would remain as advisor for the team.
