= Terri Jackson =

American sports union executive

Terri Carmichael Jackson
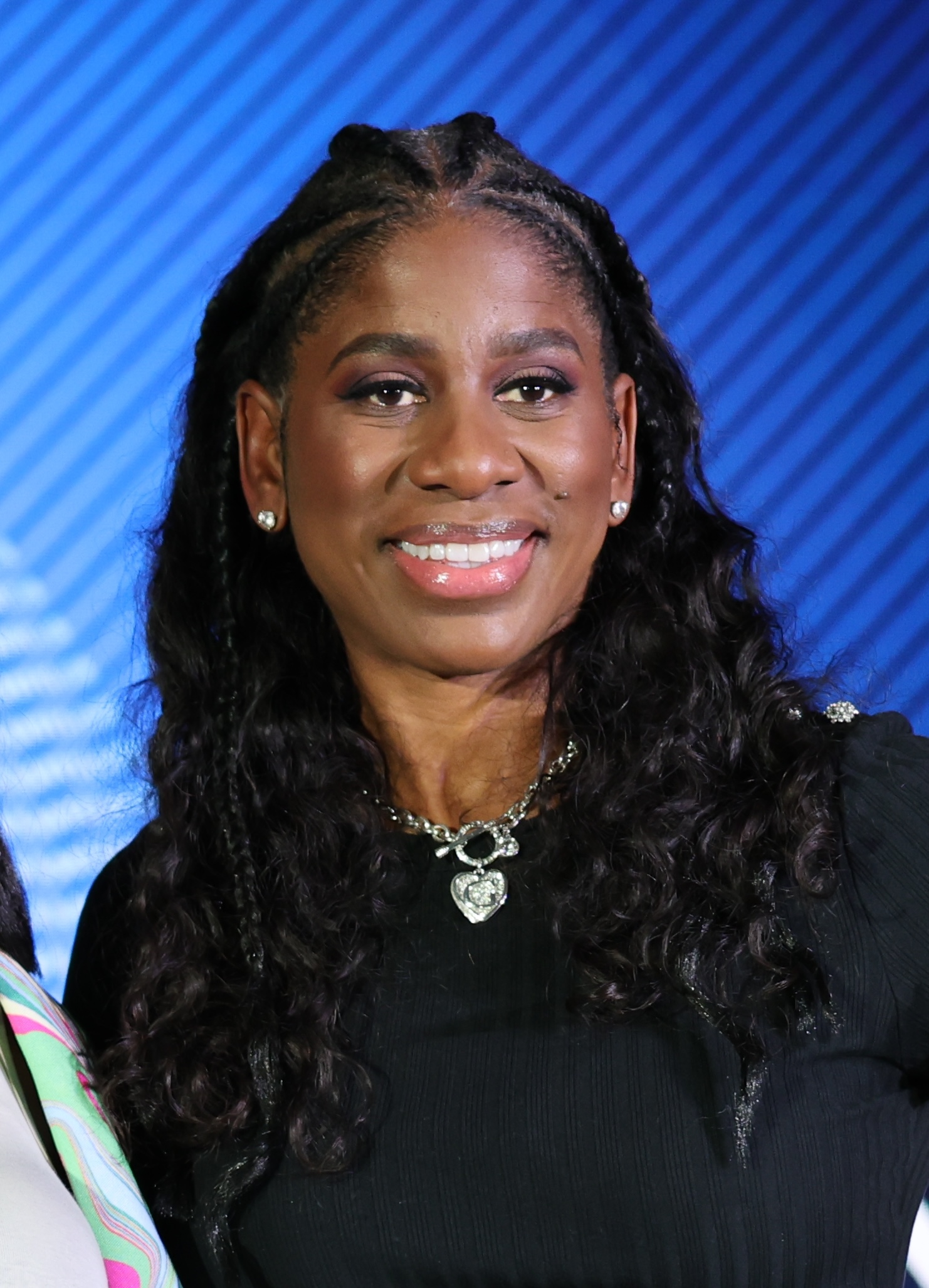
- Born: Terri Carmichael
- Education: Georgetown University
- Title: Executive director of the Women's National Basketball Players Association
- Spouse: Jaren Jackson (m. 1997; div. 2026)
- Children: Jaren Jackson Jr.

Terri Carmichael Jackson is the current executive director of the Women's National Basketball Players Association.

== Biography ==
Jackson studied law at Georgetown University, and initially planned to pursue a career in law like her father LeRoy Carmichael. After graduating, she moved to New Orleans, where she founded the non-profit Back on the Block Foundation. She later served as a law professor at Tulane University and worked at a law firm in Louisiana before becoming legal counsel for athletics at University of the District of Columbia. She spent four years as director of law, policy and governance for the NCAA before being named director of operations for the Women's National Basketball Players Association in 2016. Shortly after, she was named Executive Director.

During her tenure as Executive Director of the WNBPA, Jackson helped lead the union through a series of collective bargaining negotiations that reshaped the economic structure of the league. In 2018, the players voted to opt out of its collective bargaining agreement (CBA) with the WNBA for the first time in its history. A new agreement was reached in 2020, introducing increased salaries, enhanced maternity and family planning benefits, and improved travel and working conditions for players. Jackson also protested the fining of WNBA players who wore unauthorized t-shirts that supported Black Lives Matter, along with other uniform infractions.

In 2020, Jackson was featured in Sports Illustrated's "The Unrelenting", on the list of the most powerful women in sports.

In 2021, the WNBPA launched a multi-year partnership with PepsiCo in 2021 to help finance philanthropic causes.

In 2026, Jackson played a central role in negotiating a new CBA widely described as transformational for the league and players. The agreement followed the WNBPA’s decision to opt out of its existing CBA in 2024, a move that positioned players to renegotiate terms amid significant league growth and increased commercial momentum.

The new agreement introduced a revenue-sharing framework tied to league growth and significantly increased player compensation, including a nearly 400% rise in average salaries. According to reporting by The Wall Street Journal, the deal represents the largest percentage-based pay increase in U.S. professional sports history and may be one of the largest ever negotiated by a labor union. The agreement also included substantial increases to the salary cap, expanded player benefits, and continued improvements to professional standards across the league.

== Personal life ==
Jackson is divorced from former basketball player Jaren Jackson. The couple had a son, NBA All-Star player Jaren Jackson Jr., in 1999.
