= Patterson School of Diplomacy and International Commerce =

International affairs school of the University of Kentucky

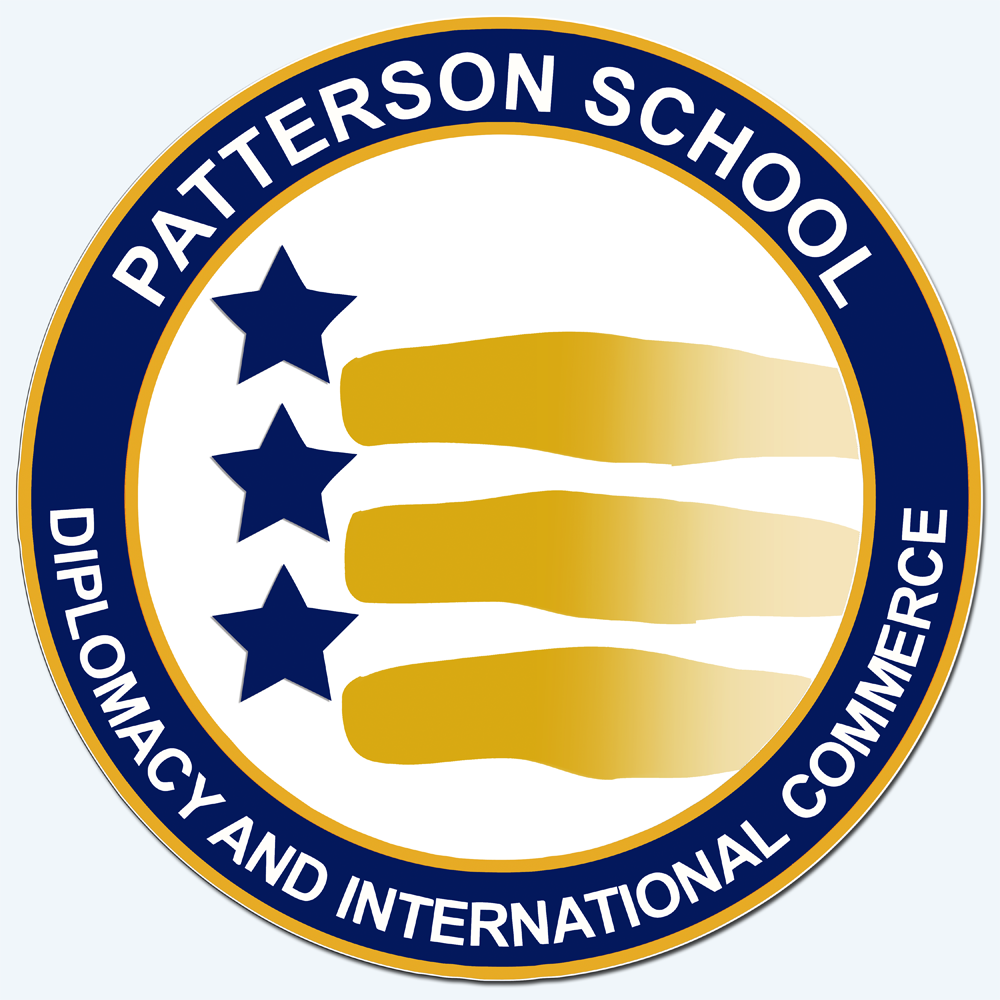
- Motto: Personal; Passionate; Professional
- Type: Public
- Established: 1959
- Parent institution: University of Kentucky
- Director: Dr. Joseph K. Young, Director
- Students: 70 graduate students
- Location: Lexington, Kentucky; 38.0385°N 84.5045°W
- Mission: The Patterson School serves the state, nation and world by the rigorous education of future leaders to work in international diplomacy, commerce, development, intelligence and security. This is accomplished in a flexible, intimate learning environment that integrates academic studies, practical training, and real world experience.
- Website: pattersonschool.uky.edu

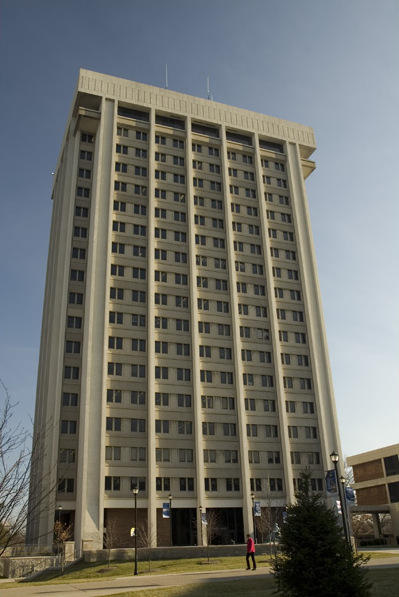
Patterson Office Tower, home of the school of diplomacy.

The Patterson School of Diplomacy and International Commerce is part of the University of Kentucky located in Lexington, Kentucky. It is a graduate program devoted to the study of diplomacy, international affairs, and commerce.

== History ==
The vision to create a school of diplomacy and international commerce came from Dr. James Kennedy Patterson, the first president of the University of Kentucky. The 1898 Spanish–American War convinced Patterson a new school was needed that "shall have for its special object the preparation of young men for the diplomatic and consular service of the United States. It shall also provide special training for those who may seek employment in extending upon rational and scientific lines the commercial relations of America." Patterson took as his model the programs he saw then being established at Harvard, Stanford, Chicago, Cornell and Yale.

Patterson understood the United States was becoming a political and commercial world power and believed new institutions were needed to properly prepare Americans for this role. He also had a clear vision about how they should be educated. In 1903, speaking in Washington, DC on "Education and Empire," Patterson declared students must be educated not only as scholars and scientists, but as citizens who will be engaged in shaping the destinies of the world. This philosophy - requiring that students be exposed to both theory and practice - has always been at the core of the Patterson School.

Plans for a new institution centered on diplomatic and commercial training ran afoul of an abysmal budget situation at the start of the 20th century. The new state university Patterson led was struggling to survive. Indeed, he tapped his own personal resources to construct the university's first buildings. When he retired in 1910, his dream remained unfulfilled, but not forgotten. A trust established by Patterson's will in 1922 with almost his entire estate called for the creation of a college of diplomacy. He named the school after his only child, William Andrew Patterson, who died of illness as a young man. To make his vision a reality, however, the funds had to be invested for decades. While the endowment was not large enough to fully fund Patterson's ambitious vision, by 1959 it had increased enough - with additional funding from the Commonwealth of Kentucky - to launch the Patterson School of Diplomacy and International Commerce.

From the very beginning, the Patterson School program was designed exclusively for graduate students. Initially, both masters and doctoral degrees were offered. In 1970, however, the decision was made to concentrate solely on training at the master's degree level for students seeking professional careers in international affairs. From three jointly appointed faculty members in 1960, the Patterson School acquired its first core faculty in 1972 and began a strengthening of its interdisciplinary nature (drawing upon associated faculty from across the entire university) that continues to this day. The program was originally housed on campus in a surplus army barracks, but moved to the Patterson Office Tower after its construction in 1969 where it remains today.

== Former directors ==
- Professor Amry Vandenbosch (former State Department and OSS official), 1959–1966
- Professor Richard Butwell, 1966–1967
- Professor Vincent Davis (former Naval officer), 1971–1993
- Professor John Stempel (former State Department FSO), 1993–2003
- Professor Michael C. Desch, 2003–2004
- Professors George C. Herring and Karen Mingst (interim), 2005
- Ambassador Carey Cavanaugh, (former State Department FSO) 2006–2016
- Professor Karen Mingst (interim), 2016
- Professor Kathleen Montgomery (interim), 2017–2024
- Professor Joseph K. Young, 2024–present

== Program structure ==
=== Degree ===
The 30-credit program culminates in a M.A. in Diplomacy and International Commerce with a concentration in one of the following four areas:

- Diplomacy
- International Commerce / Trade
- International Security and Intelligence
- International organizations and Development

In addition, concurrent degree programs are offered with the University of Kentucky College of Law (Patterson MA/JD) and the Gatton College of Business and Economics (Patterson MA/MBA; Patterson MA/Economics MS) and the Department of Modern and Classical Languages.
