= Rudolf V. Perina =

American diplomat

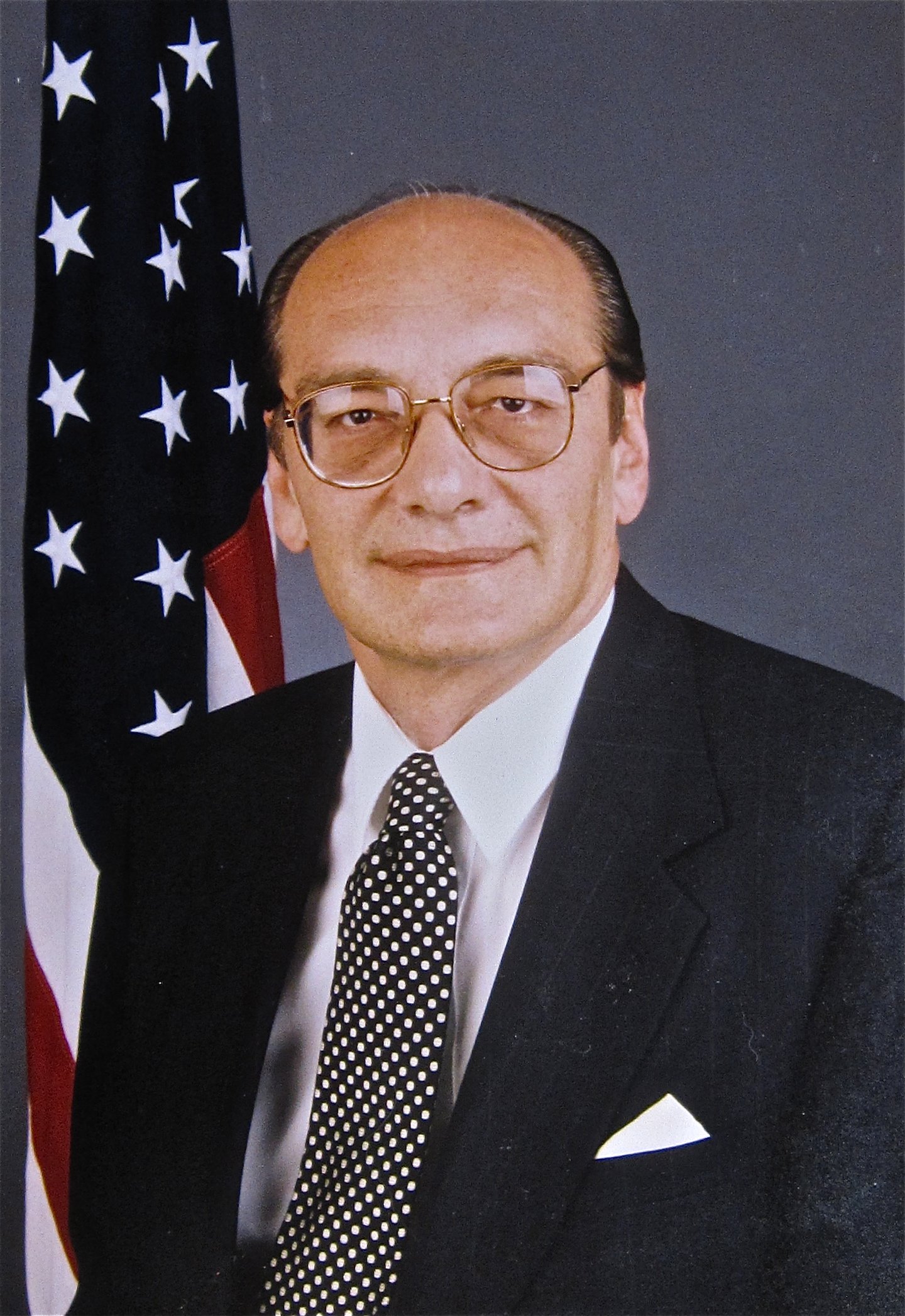
- Official portrait, 1998

Personal details
- Born: Rudolf Vilém Peřina; January 3, 1945 Tábor, Protectorate of Bohemia and Moravia
- Died: June 14, 2018 (aged 73) Vienna, Virginia, United States
- Spouse: Ethel Ott Hetherington (after 1972)
- Children: Kaja; Alexandra
- Education: University of Chicago; Columbia University

Rudolf Vilem Perina (Czech: Rudolf Vilém Peřina; January 3, 1945 – June 14, 2018) was an American diplomat who specialized for more than three decades in European East–West relations during and after the Cold War, and on the Dayton Accords following the dissolution of the Former Republic of Yugoslavia. This includes participating in the 1988 Moscow summit meeting between President Reagan and General Secretary Mikhail Gorbachev, during the former's first visit to the USSR. He also served as ambassador to the Republic of Moldova, U.S. Special Negotiator for Eurasian Conflicts in the former Soviet Union (an ambassador-level position), Deputy Assistant Secretary for European and Canadian Affairs in the State Department, director of European and Soviet Affairs for the U.S. National Security Council, and was on the policy planning staff of the State Department under Colin Powell before and after the invasion of Iraq.

Following his retirement from the foreign service, Perina served as chargé d’affaires at U.S. embassies, including those in Chișinău, Moldova (2006), Yerevan, Armenia (2007), Reykjavík, Iceland (2010), Prague, Czech Republic (2013), and Bratislava, Slovakia (2015).

== Early life and family ==
Perina was born on January 3, 1945, in Tábor in what is today the Czech Republic. His father's family owned a large lumbermill serving Central Europe. His mother's family was subject to Nazi reprisals during World War II, including the execution of his grandfather and great uncle on June 10, 1942. The family members were executed in a coordinated purge of Czech nationalists and public figures that culminated in the razing of the village of Lidice.

Perina and his parents fled Czechoslovakia following the 1948 Communist takeover of the government. Rudolf's mother paid a Croat border smuggler to transport her son in January 1950 to the border into Austria and eventually to Zürich, where his father had escaped. The family lived as refugees in Switzerland and Morocco before immigrating to the United States via Le Havre, France, in 1951.

He grew up speaking Czech at home. In 1955, the family moved to Cleveland, and Perina obtained US citizenship the following year.

== Education ==
After the family moved to Seattle, Perina attended Franklin High School, where he graduated as the valedictorian in 1963. He chose the University of Chicago as it offered him full tuition with a stipend. He earned his B.A. degree in history there in 1967 and did his graduate studies at Columbia University, where he received his M.A. and Ph.D. degrees in European history, with the idea of going into academia. While studying in New York, he was hired by a film production company to consult and interpret for the filming of a documentary about the 1968 reform movement in Czechoslovakia known as the "Prague Spring". This led to the topic of his Ph.D dissertation: "Intellectuals and Political Change in Czechoslovakia: A History of Literarni noviny and its Contributors, 1952–1969." He had also earned a Foreign Area Fellowship to research his dissertation at the library of Radio Free Europe for two years.

Perina was at Columbia during the 1968 student protests. While supportive of the US civil rights movement and against the Vietnam War, he maintained a moderate political position, saying later "I became suspicious of all political extremism and radicalism, whether right-wing or left-wing. It is a position I have held all of my life."

== Career ==
Returning from Europe to finish his dissertation, Perina found that there were few academic jobs available in the U.S. He saw an ad for the foreign service exam and encouraged by the example of foreign-born Henry Kissinger, he took it and passed. Delighted to find that it paid better than any academic job, he started in November 1974, his first posting at the U.S. Embassy in Ottawa, Canada, through 1976 during which time both of his daughters were born.

At this post, Perina gave Russian author Alexander Solzhenitsyn his first US visa, whereby he communicated to him in German. (Already fluent in Czech and French, Perina became fluent in Russian later.) He found that the author of One Day in the Life of Ivan Denisovich and other works "took the process more seriously than almost any other applicant" he had processed up to that time. In reflecting on Solzhenitsyn's conscientiousness later, Perina concluded that "if you spend your life fighting a bureaucracy, your first thought is to not make a mistake in an official document that the bureaucracy can use against you."

At Ottawa, Perina also had responsibilities in the Commission on Security and Cooperation in Europe (CSCE) whose Helsinki Final Act was signed by the 35 participating states in the summer of 1975.

=== Moscow ===
He was then posted to Moscow, and was there during the Soviet invasion of Afghanistan. Upon witnessing the confrontation with 1st Deputy Foreign Minister Georgy Korniyenko, he said later he was "shown for the first time how unashamedly people can lie in diplomacy." The US response to the invasion was tough, and included suspending exchanges, diplomatic social events, wheat sales, and eventually boycotting the Moscow Olympics, bringing Africa, the Middle East, Latin America, and part of Eastern Europe along as well. Of the time, Perina has said, "our relations with the Soviets there were very competitive. We were always watching what they did, and they watched us."

Although compared to the average Soviet citizen, he lived better, Perina has described that life in the Soviet capital "could be difficult". During the harsh winters, he had to remove his car battery each night to prevent its freezing. The Perinas also saw first hand the psychological warfare the KGB enacted on US embassy personnel, Perina describing his wife Ethel's coat disappearing for several months then reappearing in their closet.

=== West Berlin ===
He then started to work at the U.S. Mission in West Berlin in 1981. The US saw East Berlin differently from the GDR. Considered a Soviet zone, the Americans maintained another embassy in East Berlin, and the mission in West Berlin avoided dealing with the East Germans by going to the Soviets for things related to them. (The Soviets on the other hand respected the city as part of the GDR and the capital of East Germany.) Perina also described that in Berlin in 1981 it was so easy for the four occupying powers, which included the United Kingdom and France, plus East and West Germany, to spy on each other being in such close proximities that "the city with more espionage going on per square mile than any other city in Europe." He said that "There was a lot of eavesdropping."

As liaison with the Soviets on Russian matters, Perina said that "Nobody seriously thought there was going to be a World War III or an invasion of Berlin by the Warsaw Pact." The diplomat also never got the sense things were loosening up in the USSR. Although he personally did not know whether the Strategic Defense Initiative system (SDIs) would even work, he understood that the Soviets were threatened by the possibility: He said, "They realized their strength as a world power came from possession of nuclear weapons, and not from their GDP or anything else." (There was talk too in Germany about NATO deployment of immediate range nuclear missiles.)

Perina served as interpreter between ambassadors Arthur Burns and Piotr Abrassimov, then Vyacheslav Kochemasov during their twice yearly social lunches. There was bureaucratic protocol too that had to be observed whenever the West German president came to Berlin—the US, French, and British embassies had to greet him formally—which Perina described as a "real nuisance". He also witnessed the tensions in Poland: The country was moving toward martial law, and Perina describes that by the end of his time there, he and his colleagues were witnessing six or seven Polish plane hijackings to West Berlin a year. He also saw the rivalry between the two Germanys, but felt the real threat at the time was from radical groups like the Baader-Meinhof gang.

Russia was ... a basketcase. The standard of living had declined even from Soviet times. The Russian people had made enormous sacrifices to get rid of Communism and were really hoping for help and partnership with the West. The NATO expansion made them think that the reverse was happening--that their weakness was being exploited. And Russian nationalists and demagogues came forward to take advantage of this perception.— Rudolf V. Perina

=== Brussels and the 1988 Moscow Summit ===
Perina then worked at the U.S. Mission to NATO in Brussels from 1985, as political officer and deputy US representative to the organization's political committee. The group was handling three simultaneous negotiations, on Strategic Arms Reduction Treaty (START), Intermediate-Range Nuclear Forces Treaty (INF), and SDIs for a number of visits by President Reagan to the North Atlantic Council, according to Perina, "the most comprehensive arms control discussion between the US and the Soviet Union." The diplomat's impression of NATO was that it was an American-run organization, with the allies all deferring to the US.

From 1987 to 1989, Perina was director for European and Soviet Affairs on the National Security Council staff: prior to his arrival there had been a purge from the Iran Contra scandal. He was brought in by Colin Powell, who had been hired by new National Security Council Advisor Frank Carlucci, who ran the department differently, and better, in Perina's opinion. Perina had the Soviet portfolio, which included working on Reagan's "Mr. Gorbachev, tear down this wall" speech. Yet even with this, the Czech-American had no suspicion that the empire was on the verge of collapse, saying "it was not even part of any discussion.... We were all watching the top, the Kremlin .... [W]e did not pay enough attention to the internal situation and particularly to the nationality issues." In preparation for the 1988 meeting between the two world leaders, Perina asked the CIA to make a film for Reagan about the Moscow sites the president would be visiting and organized a lunch for him with Soviet experts in the US: It would be Reagan's first visit to the USSR.

Perina attended the 1988 Moscow summit meeting between Presidents Reagan and Gorbachev, the third of only four total people; he later described the tension between the two principals being rooted in different negotiating styles: The Soviet's being deductive and the American's inductive. And although he found the American president very gracious, Perina found the leader of the USSR the more important historical figure "among the most important of our time." He described the former Hollywood actor as having "good instincts" but that he "clearly did not have the grasp of substance that Gorbachev had." Perina believed the summit was significant symbolically, that it influenced Reagan, the Russian people's opinion on Reagan, and changed the dynamics of the US-Russia relationship.

Perina was also in charge of the NSC's Eastern European portfolio and visited Romania under Nikolai Ceausescu. He described it as a "desperate place" where there was no heat or electricity, and hardly any food in its stores. He said he could see clearly "the fear everyone so clearly had in their eyes," even those around the Rleader himself. Perina left the NSC in spring 1989 when President Bush and Brent Scowcroft instituted a complete shift in personnel for political reasons.

=== Vienna, Belgrade and the Dayton Accord ===
From 1989 to 1992, Perina was deputy chairman of the U.S. Delegation to the Vienna negotiations on Confidence and Security Building Measures in Europe (CSBM), held under auspices of the Organization for Security and Cooperation in Europe (OSCE).

From 1993 to 1996, he was Chief of Mission at the U.S. Embassy in Belgrade, Serbia with the title of Charge d’Affaires and worked with a downsized staff. The country was under UN sanctions, and extreme inflation had forced the country to depend on the black market. Embassy matters were all handled on a cash basis: Perina describes having tens of thousands of dollars driven in from Budapest, Hungary in an unguarded car so as not to arouse suspicion from the gangs who then ruled the streets.

Perina worked with Richard Holbrooke as liaison to Serbian President Slobodan Milosevic during the negotiations to end the Yugoslav conflict. (Some considered Holbrooke's work to have merited the Nobel Peace Prize later.) They had a dozen meetings with the Serbian ruler with others around, then met him one on one because they found him more engaging in that capacity. Perina saw a "genuine lack of compassion that was truly frightening" and said that this feeling extended to his treatment of his countrymen, the Serbs. Perina also participated in the talks held in Dayton, Ohio, to which he credits Milosevic's assent, although mostly for self-serving purposes: The leader thought he would gain respectability in the international community and sanctions would be lifted. Perina also met with Ibrahim Rugova, the elected president of the Republic of Kosovo, whom along with Macedonia's Kiro Gligorov Perina found to be the most impressive leaders in the former Yugoslavia.

Milosevic could agree to the terms of the Dayton Agreement because he was not really a Serb nationalist. He did not care that much about Serbs. He cared about Milosevic. He thought that by helping to conclude an agreement at Dayton his past actions would be forgotten and he would gain legitimacy and respect. But he was wrong. Kosovo was still outstanding, and it would prove to be his downfall.
— Rudolf V. Perina

Perina served as Senior Deputy Assistant Secretary of State for European and Canadian Affairs; in 1996–97 the majority of his time was spent helping to execute the Dayton Accords from Washington, D.C. while John Kornblum travelled to implement them. This included the outer wall of sanctions that enraged the Serbs and did not satisfy Kosovar Albanians (They would form the Kosovo Liberation Army.) As the former USSR was now handled by the Office of Newly Independent States (NIS) and not the European bureau, the other third of Perina's time was spent on helping to expand NATO, which he said he felt ambivalence towards: The powerful organization did not help integrate the Russians into Europe and damaged the US's relationship to Russia. He has said "I fear the way we handled revanchism made it a self-fulfulling prophecy." He saw and was shocked by Sarajevo at the end of the war, which described as "miles and miles of just rubble." Perina has said European and Canadian Affairs was one of his least favorite because it was so bureaucratic and based in the US capital.

=== Moldova ===
Perina was assigned and confirmed ambassadorship to the Republic of Moldova, serving from 1998 to 2001. He studied Romanian and reviewed his Russian before starting and found the former Soviet republic "a much more pleasant place" than he had imagined: "The people were extremely friendly and hospitable, and the country was a very interesting place to work." His job was to help it develop into a successful, autonomous nation. It was one of the earliest to privatize land, helped by a major USAID project that completed under Perina: The US gave over $50 million in assistance, the third highest amount given to a former Soviet republic, because of its cooperation and its efforts at reform. Several hundred Moldovans were sent to the US every year on exchange programs; Perina was also particularly proud of the Peace Corps contingent he saw there.

Moldova was a main source of the trafficking of women from the former Soviet Union: Many young women were lured into the trade with promises of jobs as nannies and waitresses in Western Europe, the Balkans and the Middle East. The embassy tried to combat this with educational programs and financing a documentary film with victim testimonies that were shown in schools, on billboards and on national TV.

He was in Moldova during the Transnistria War, and though the US was not one of the three official mediators (those being Russia, Ukraine, and the OSCE), the heads of the OSCE mission were American because the Moldovan government wanted to counterbalance their former rulers. Regardless, Perina met with Moldovan Presidents Petru Lucinschi then Vladimir Voronin on policy toward Transnistria, even initiating dialogue with the breakaway eastern region's so-called president, Igor Smirnov.

Perina describes these half dozen talks with Smirnov as disheartening. This is because the disputed region had become a staging area for smuggling operations that avoided taxes and customs duties. Ukrainians and Moldovans alike profited off the illegal importation of cigarettes, liquor, and "many other commodities" that hurt the republic in lost tax revenue. Another problem was the 40,000 tons of aging Soviet ammunition stored at Cosbasna base in Transnistria: The US was a major contributor of several million dollars to a voluntary OSCE fund to aid in arms withdrawal and though there was a limited destruction of tanks and a half trainload of weapons and ammunition, Russian troops and old but still dangerous armaments were kept in the region for political leverage. The economic conflict of the region was also rooted in a lot of Moldova's industry being located in Transnistria, planned by Stalin.

=== Nagorno-Karabakh and three other former Soviet territories with conflicts ===
Perina became the U.S. Special Negotiator for Nagorno-Karabakh and Eurasian Conflicts from 2001, flying out on September 23 when the US airports were reopened after 9/11. The ambassador-level job was Washington D.C.-based but involved a great deal of travel: He was the lead U.S. representative to international efforts to resolve four conflicts in territories of the former Soviet Union: Transnistria, Nagorno-Karabakh, Abkhazia, and South Ossetia (Chechnya was the fifth former territory that also had strife but Russia did not let outside influence on it).

The Nagorno-Karabakh conflict had roots in the 1990s war between Armenia and Azerbaijan: Perina called it a "true indigenous conflict" between the two countries. The OSCE and its specially created Minsk Group handled the crisis, with many proposals by the latter rejected by both nations, represented by Presidents Kocharyan and Aliyev respectively, over the years. The first meeting of what came to be known as the Prague Process took place outside the capital at Stirin Palace in mid-May 2002, a location that Perina helped arranged for. During the US diplomat's tenure through 2004, it remained a stalemated conflict lacking peacekeeping troops to maintain the separation between the sides with a few soldiers on both sides killed monthly by sniper fire. Perina 's 2002 idea of a referendum became the major consideration by 2004: The idea being that residents of Nagorno-Karabakh before hostilities would be able to vote, using lists from the Soviet era. With the intransigence of the two sides, in the end, the conflict was frozen; Perina said of it "the most you can hope for is stabilizing this conflict rather than really resolving it."

Sometimes freezing a conflict under agreed terms can be a way of resolving it, for all practical purposes.
— Rudolf V. Perina

The Abkhaz were an ethnic minority who participating in the ethnic cleansing of several hundred thousand Georgians in the 1990s with the help of Russians and Chechens. There were 200,000 refugees that resulted. In Perina's view, "The hatred between [the two groups] was the worst I had ever seen in either the Balkans of the Caucauses" calling it "even greater than that between the Serbs and the Albanians." The negotiating process over Abkhazia stalled but its very existence reduced pressure on the Georgian side for military action against it.

The hostility in South Ossetia was a result of the succession by an ethnic group in Georgia that didn't want to be a part of an independent Georgia, didn't accept its sovereignty, and was protected in this by Russia. The disaccord, per Perina, nevertheless the most promising of the conflicts as the "hatred was not as deep." He felt that most of the population would have welcomed a settlement. The EU was interested in aiding but the Russians blocked them.

Perina kept working on the Transnistria in ex-officio capacity as the US was not one of the designated mediators. A mandate to resolve this conflict would have institutionalized Russia's presence in Moldova. Deputy Prime Minister of the Russian Federation Dmitry Kozak attempted to head off the involvement of other countries by arranging for their own settlement for Vladmir Voronin to sign, giving Transnistria de facto veto power over big Moldovan policy decisions. When the Moldovans got wind of the memorandum, 50,000 demonstrated in its capital. There was also Georgia's Rose Revolution, which ousted President Shevardnadze out, and Veronin was successfully talked out of signing.

=== Policy planning for the State Department ===
From 2004 to 2006, Perina served as deputy director of the State Department's Policy Planning staff. He worked under both Colin Powell then Condi Rice, and the latter focussed only on Iraq and the Middle East. Perina found it bizarre that within the State Department, there was little debate on the decision to invade the former. (There were also no experts on the Muslim world in the department.) "The tipping point came imperceptibly, and suddenly everyone just assumed we would invade. The Afghanistan invasion ... appeared to have been successful." He witnessed the policy tensions between Donald Rumsfeld of the Defense Department and Powell on the issue of responsibility for the administration of Iraq. As no one was prepared to do it, and the Office of Reconstruction and Stabilization was created in the State Department which would have a coordinator and a small staff of about a dozen who would come up with action plans and lists of experts including those outside of government to deal with humanitarian assistance, training police, instituting civil authority, and the like.

Under Powell, Perina went to sub-Saharan Africa with an expert to start policy consultation with the African Union. He witnessed the rapid radicalization of Muslim communities on the continent by means of the madrassas staffed by Middle Eastern teachers. The Bush administration faulted the foreign service for this, refusing to see it connected to the invasion of Iraq. Powell, whom Perina called "probably the best Secretary I have worked for" was also the first major leader to name what was happening in Darfur as genocide, calling for a peacekeeping force but no country was up to it. Perina credits humanitarian organizations for relief supplies and food.

Perina officially retired on April 30, 2006, after 32 years in the foreign service.

=== Armenia, Iceland, the Czech Republic, and Slovakia ===
In 2007 Perina became the chargé d’affaires at U.S. embassies for Armenia, 2010 for Iceland, 2013 the Czech Republic, and 2015 for Slovakia.

== Non-diplomatic appointments ==
In 2007, Perina completed an oral history of his life and career for Frontline Diplomacy: the Foreign Affairs Oral History Collection of the Association for Diplomatic Studies and Training. It is available online through the Library of Congress.

He was the Scarff Visiting Professor of International Relations at Lawrence University in Appleton, Wisconsin in fall 2010 and was on the council of advisors of the Wende Museum, a research institute and archive of the Cold War located in Culver City, California.

== Personal life ==
He met his wife, Ethel Ott Hetherington, at the 1968 Columbia student protests, and they married in Salzburg, Austria, on May 26, 1972. Ethel taught at the International School of Belgrade while he was chief of mission at the U.S. Embassy there in the 1990s. He was fluent in four languages: English, Czech, Russian, and French and knew Romanian. They have two daughters, Kaja and Alexandra, and four grandchildren and lived in the Washington, D.C., area until his death on June 14, 2018.
