= WNBA Social Justice Council =

The Women's National Basketball Association/Women's National Basketball Players Association Social Justice Council is an activist committee jointly run by the WNBA and the players union which addresses systemic racism, LGBTQ+ rights, and other issues affecting women in the United States. It was formed in July 2020 after criticism of and pushback against the organizations' support of the Black Lives Matter movement.

== Background ==
The Women's National Basketball League (WNBA) has "a history of racial justice activism", according to NPR and dating back to its founding in 1997 according to CNN. According to Penn State professor of history and African American studies Amira Rose Davis, the WNBA has "always been fairly outspoken" and has a history of activism that has been often overlooked. She said, "months before Colin Kaepernick took a knee" in September 2016 and became the face of activism against police brutality, the Minnesota Lynx team in July 2016, wearing Black Lives Matter shirts they were about to wear on court, held a pre-game press conference during which they refused to discuss anything but the killing of Philando Castile and other issues surrounding police brutality. Four off-duty uniformed Minneapolis police officers working the game walked off the job and removed themselves from the list for working future games. As a league the organization had held "community partnership days" to address issues of social justice. Seattle Storm head coach Gary Kloppenburg said the league had been on the "forefront" of the social justice movement and that other major leagues looked to the WNBA for leadership in social justice issues. In 2020 the New York Times called the WNBA "the most socially progressive pro league" and said they had led other pro leagues in protesting racism and other social injustice.

== History ==
Shortly after the George Floyd protests began, the league and the players' union, the Women's National Basketball Players Association (WNBPA), decided to put Black Lives Matter and Say Her Name slogans on warmup gear and opening weekend uniforms. On 6 July, the WNBA announced their pandemic-shortened season would be "dedicated to social justice." In early July 2020, Atlanta Dream owner Senator Kelly Loeffler criticized the league's support for Black Lives Matter and asked the league commissioner Cathy Engelbert to drop support of the Black Lives Matter movement. Engelbert refused, releasing a statement saying the league would "continue to use our platforms to vigorously advocate for social justice," and the WNBA and WNBPA announced the formation of the Social Justice Council by the league and union.

== Actions ==
During their next nationally televised game after Loeffler's criticism of Black Lives Matter, the Atlanta Dream wore T-shirts saying "VOTE WARNOCK", endorsing her upcoming election opponent Raphael Warnock, an African-American pastor. Players for several other teams also wore Vote Warnock shirts in their games that night. Warnock was at the time polling at 9%; his campaign received an "immediate and noticeable spike" in donations and mentions on social media, and he later defeated Loeffler. The players' union and players from multiple teams pressured the league to force Loeffler to sell the team, which she later did.

The council has worked with the Say Her Name Campaign, which addresses incidents of police violence involving Black women and girls.

In 2021, during the COVID-19 pandemic, after there were violent attacks against Asian-Americans, players and teams tweeted support for AAPI communities. The WNBA lead American professional sports teams in promoting the COVID-19 vaccine and in getting vaccinated. Teams hosted vaccine clinics in their home arenas. In April the Social Justice Council made a PSA, Our Health is Worth a Shot, that aired during the WNBA draft. In June 2021, the WNBA announced that 99% of its players had been fully vaccinated.

== Mission ==
The WNBA/WNBPA Social Justice Council is an activist committee which addresses systemic racism, LGBTQ+ rights, voting rights, and other issues affecting women in the United States. In 2021 they added a focus on inequalities in health care and public health.

== Leadership ==
As of 2021 the organization's leadership included Layshia Clarendon, Sydney Colson, Tierra Ruffin-Pratt, Breanna Stewart, A’ja Wilson, and WNBPA Director of Player Relations Jayne Appel-Marinelli. Advisers include Alicia Garza, Rock the Vote CEO Carolyn DeWitt, Beverly Bond, Kimberlé Crenshaw, and Raquel Willis.
