= Donald Keyser =

American diplomat (born 1943)

Donald Willis Keyser (born 17 July 1943) retired from the United States Department of State in September 2004 after a 32-year career. He had been a member of the Senior Foreign Service since 1990, and held Washington-based ambassadorial-level assignments 1998–2004. Throughout his career he focused on U.S. policy toward East Asia, particularly China, Taiwan, Hong Kong, Japan and the Korean Peninsula.

Keyser attended the University of Maryland, the Stanford Inter-University Center in Taiwan, George Washington University, and the National War College. He joined the State Department in 1972, and has held a number of senior posts relating to East Asian affairs. He is fluent in Chinese.

In 2005, he pleaded guilty to unauthorized possession of secret documents, and to lying to the Federal Bureau of Investigation regarding his sexual relationship with a Taiwanese intelligence officer, Isabelle Cheng. He denied, however, passing any confidential information to Cheng, and entered into a plea bargain arrangement — in exchange for prosecutors dropping espionage charges, he would co-operate fully in their investigations. In 2006, prosecutors sought to void the plea bargain, claiming that Keyser had not fulfilled his part of the deal, but they later reversed this position, saying that Keyser had increased his level of co-operation. In January 2007, Keyser was sentenced for the original charges of possessing secret documents and lying to investigators — he served one year and one day in jail, and was fined $25,000.
