= Kent N. Brown =

American diplomat

Kent N. Brown (1944–) served as the first American Ambassador to Georgia (1992-1995).

== Career ==
During Brown's tenure in Georgia, Fred Woodruff was shot near Tbilisi. Officially listed as the regional affairs officer in the political section of the U.S. Embassy, there was speculation “Woodruff was in charge of secretly training security personnel for Georgian leader Eduard A. Shevardnadze.” Woodruff was short in the head with a single bullet while being driven by Shevardnadze's chief of personal security, Col. Eldar Gogoladze. His body was accompanied back to the United States by CIA Director R. James Woolsey flew to Georgia to bring Woodruff's body home. Brown was on record as saying the investigation would show the killing was not premeditated.
