= Cathy Engelbert =

American business woman and WNBA Commissioner

- Cathy Engelbert in 2026

Commissioner of the Women's National Basketball Association
- Incumbent
- Assumed office July 17, 2019
- Preceded by: Mark Tatum (Acting President)

Personal details
- Born: November 14, 1964 (age 61)
- Children: 2
- Education: Lehigh University (BS)

Catherine M. Engelbert (born November 14, 1964) is an American businesswoman who has served as the commissioner and executive of the Women's National Basketball Association (WNBA) since 2019. She previously served as the first female CEO of Deloitte.

Engelbert worked for Deloitte for 33 years and was elected as its CEO in 2015, becoming the first woman to lead a Big Four accounting firm. In 2019, she was named the commissioner of the WNBA and made headlines in the following year for creating the Wubble amid the COVID-19 pandemic and supporting player activism. Engelbert has led the league to rapid commercial growth, historic popularity, and its most significant expansion in history, but has faced criticism over player compensation and league decisions. She has been ranked among the most powerful businesswomen in the world by Fortune magazine for her roles in the WNBA and Deloitte.

== Early life and education ==
Engelbert grew up in Collingswood, New Jersey, with five brothers and two sisters. She attended Collingswood High School. She was inducted into the Collingswood Athletic Hall of Fame in 1993. Her father, Kurt, was an IT manager, and her mother a medical practice administrator. Kurt Engelbert was a star basketball player at St. Joseph’s University (Phila.) and was drafted in the fourth round by the Detroit Pistons in 1957. Engelbert graduated from Lehigh University in 1986, with a degree in accounting.

At Lehigh, she tried out for the basketball team as a walk-on under Hall of Fame coach Muffet McGraw, and later became a team captain. She also played lacrosse, and became a captain of that team as well. She was inducted into the Lehigh Athletic Hall of Fame in 2026. After graduation, she received her CPA certification and became a member of the American Institute of Certified Public Accountants.

== Career ==
=== Deloitte ===
Engelbert joined Deloitte in 1986 and made partner in 1998. A year before making partner she had decided to resign to pursue a career outside of professional services; two senior partners who saw her potential helped convince her to stay. As partner she held multiple leadership roles, serving on the Deloitte LLP board of directors and several committees, and in 2014 was appointed as CEO of the audit subsidiary Deloitte & Touche LLP.

In March 2015 Engelbert was elected CEO of Deloitte, becoming the first female U.S. CEO of a Big Four firm. News media outlets, including The Wall Street Journal, highlighted Engelbert's appointment as cracking the "glass ceiling." In an interview, she credited Deloitte's early focus on supporting women in the workplace as being important for her career.

While serving as Deloitte's CEO, Engelbert made investments in technology and took steps to prioritize employee retention. During her tenure as CEO, Deloitte's revenue increased 30% to over $20 billion.

=== WNBA commissioner ===
On May 15, 2019, Engelbert was named the first commissioner of the WNBA (previous WNBA leaders had been titled "president"). She officially assumed her new role on July 17, 2019. Engelbert has focused on growing the league, improving the player experience, building on corporate partnerships, and preparing for the renegotiation of the WNBA's media rights. She has presided over a significant expansion of the league, adding franchises in San Francisco, Portland, and Toronto, with future expansion franchises planned for Cleveland, Detroit, and Philadelphia.

Engelbert faced criticism from players during negotiations for a new CBA in 2025, with the "central tension" being player compensation that lagged behind the league's revenue growth.

Engelbert is a member of The Business Council. She also serves on the boards of McDonald’s Corporation, Royalty Pharma, and Catalyst, and on the executive committee of the USGA.

Between 2024 and 2025, WNBA franchises saw a 180% growth rate year-over-year when Caitlin Clark entered the league, over double the previous year-over-year record for a sports league.

On September 4, 2026, it was announced that Englebert would retire as WNBA Commissioner on December 31, 2026.

== Personal life ==
Engelbert has two children, Julia and Tommy.
